= Meinersen station =

Railway station in Meinersen, Germany

Meinersen

General information
- Location: Leiferde, Lower Saxony; Germany
- Coordinates: 52°26′57″N 10°19′21″E
- Line: Berlin–Lehrte railway
- Platforms: 2

Other information
- Station code: 4031
- DS100 code: HMRS
- Category: 6
- Fare zone: VRB: 17; GVH: E (VRB transitional tariff, monthly passes only)
Location

Meinersen (German: Bahnhof Meinersen) is a railway station located in Ohof, near Meinersen and Seershausen, Germany. The station is located on the Berlin-Lehrte Railway. The train services are operated by Metronom.

== Train services ==
The station is serves by the following service(s):

- Regional services RE 30 Hannover - Lehrte - Gifhorn - Wolfsburg

Preceding station	Metronom	Following station
Dedenhausen towards Hannover Hbf	RE 30	Leiferde bei Gifhorn towards Wolfsburg Hbf
