= Müden =

Müden may refer to the following places:

Germany

- Müden (Aller), a municipality in the district of Gifhorn, Lower Saxony
- Müden (Örtze), a village in the district of Celle, Lower Saxony
- Müden (Mosel), a municipality in the district of Cochem-Zell, Rhineland-Palatinate

South Africa

- Muden, KwaZulu-Natal
