= Matvey Slavin =

German artist

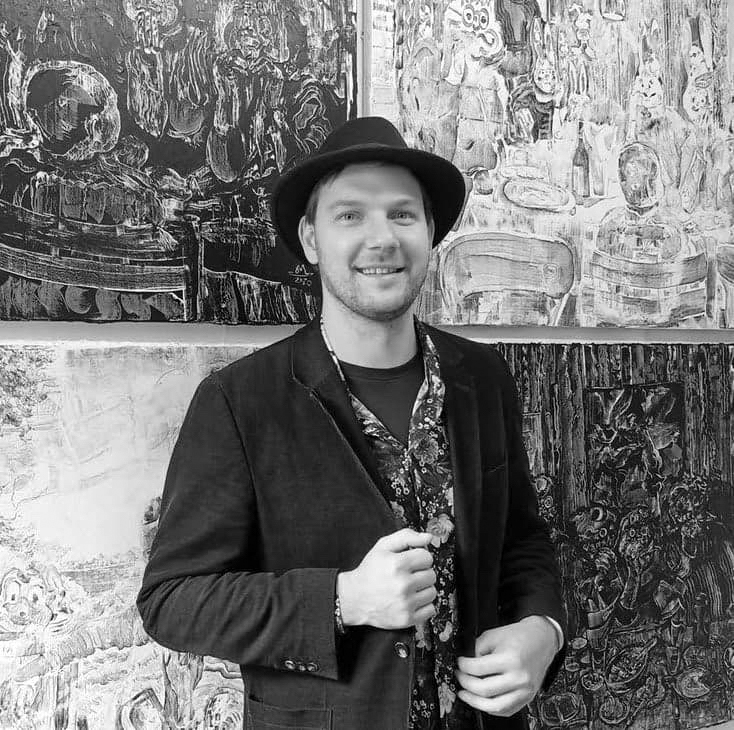
- Matvey Slavin, 2020
- Born: 19 April 1987; Saint-Petersburg, Russia
- Education: Hamburg University of Applied Sciences, University of Fine Arts of Hamburg
- Known for: Painting; drawing; collage
- Movement: Popdada
- Spouse: Nana Rosenørn Holland Bastrup

Matvey Slavin, also known as MatWay (Russian: Матвей Александрович Славин) born on 19 April 1987 in Leningrad (modern day Saint Petersburg) is a German-Danish artist. He lives and works in Copenhagen. He is a member of the artist duo Enfants Terribles and founder of Popdada and Neograttage.

== Education ==
He studied in 2006–2011 at Hamburg University of Applied Sciences, in 2011–2015 at University of Fine Arts of Hamburg among others by visiting prof. Markus Vater and in 2013–2014 at Akademie der bildenden Künste Wien by prof. Daniel Richter.

== Work grants ==
In 2014–2015 he became work grants at Künstlerhaus Meinersen with a scholarship of the Foundation Bösenberg (1 year), in 2016 at Künstlerhaus im Schlossgarten in Cuxhaven (6 months) and in 2018 at Katholische Akademie Schwerte (3 months).

== Exhibitions ==
=== Solo Exhibitions (Selection) ===
- 2022: MatWay – Neo-Grattage, kunstmix, Copenhagen, Denmark
- 2021: SKAKMAT, Blaa Galleri, Copenhagen, Denmark; Tugend und Sünde, Catholic Academy, Schwerte, Denmark
- 2020: Tugend und Sünde, Bank für Kirche und Caritas, Paderborn, Germany
- 2019: Copenhagen Open Air, galleri kunstmix, Copenhagen, Denmark
- 2018: Image Hunter, galleri kunstmix, Copenhagen, Denmark; Image Hunter, Catholic Academy, Schwerte, Germany
- 2017: Fiction Factory, galleri kunstmix, Copenhagen, Denmark
- 2016: Geflasht von Trash, Galerie OST-ART im Kulturring, Berlin, Germany
- 2011: Hamburger Landschaften, Galerie Kunst-nah, Hamburg, Germany
- 2008: Die Elbe von der Speicherstadt bis Blankenese – KulturForum Altona, Hamburg, Germany

=== Duo Exhibitions (Selection) ===
- 2020: Greifbar, BLAA Galleri, Copenhagen, Denmark (with Meik Brüsch)
- 2019: Open Up, Galerie subjectobject, Berlin, Germany (with Peter Lindeberg)
- 2018: ET – Yellow Popdada, galleri kunstmix, Copenhagen, Denmark; ET – Red Popdada, galleri kunstmix, Copenhagen, Denmark (Enfants Terribles – Nana Bastrup & Matvey Slavin)
- 2017: ET – Von nix kommt nix, galleri kunstmix, Copenhagen, Denmark; ET – Popdadaistische Blabla- & Laufbilder, Galerie 149, Bremerhaven, Germany; ET – Berliner Kuriositaeten, Studio Bildende Kunst im Kulturring, Berlin, Germany; ET – Popdada-Dadapop, galleri kunstmix, Copenhagen, Denmark (Enfants Terribles – Nana Bastrup & Matvey Slavin)
- 2016: ET – Popdada, Galerie subject-object, Berlin, Germany; ET – Laufbilder – Cuxhavener Kuriositäten, Künstlerhaus im Schloßgarten, Cuxhaven, Denmark; ET – Wir sind soweit, Kuenstlerhaus im Schloßgarten, Cuxhaven, Germany; ET – Enfants Terribles, Huset, Asnaes, Denmark (Enfants Terribles – Nana Bastrup & Matvey Slavin)
- 2015: ET – Kribbel-Krabbel, Künstlerhaus, Meinersen, Germany (Enfants Terribles – Nana Bastrup & Matvey Slavin)
- 2014: ET – Laufbilder, Ubik Space, Vienna, Austria; ET – Laufbilder & Videoskulpturen, Galerie Hengevoss-Dürkop, Hamburg, Germany; ET – Kinder der Louise B., Kunstverein Barsinghausen, Germany (Enfants Terribles – Nana Bastrup & Matvey Slavin)
- 2013: ET – Viking Revival, Galleri Labr, Roskilde, Denmark; ET – Inszenierte Träume I + II, Galerie Kurt im Hirsch, Berlin, Germany (Enfants Terribles – Nana Bastrup & Matvey Slavin)
- 2012: ET – Vernetzt, Bräuning Contemporary, Hamburg, Germany; Mensch und Ware, Altonaer Museum, Hamburg, Germany (Enfants Terribles – Nana Bastrup & Matvey Slavin)

=== Group Exhibitions (Selection) ===
- 2023: Galerie Provence, Vadum, Denmark; Waou 23, Galleri NB, Viborg, Denmark; Summer Group Show, Galleri KBH kunst, Copenhagen; Handgaard, Heiberg, and MatWay, Galleri 2132 – Roslev, Denmark; Corner Exhibition, Gammelgaard, Herlev, Denmark; Camouflage, subjectobject, Berlin, Germany
- 2022: UDS 22 – Ung Dansk Samtidstkunst, Kunstbygningen, Vrå, Denmark; KP 22 – Kunstnernes Påskeudstilling, Kunsthal Aarhus, Denmark; Pleinair Exhibition 7 Malen Dölln, Galerie im Neuen Rathaus, Templin, Germany
- 2021: REMIX #7, kunstmix Pop-Up, Galleri Fjellvang, Copenhagen, Denmark; Galleri47s Juleudstilling, Galleri47, Næstved, Denmark; The Krunchist Movement III, Blaa Galleri, Copenhagen, Denmark; The Beginning, Galleri 47, Næstved, Denmark; Krunchist Movement II, Blaa Galleri, Copenhagen, Denmark; 7 malen Uckermark Pleinairmalerei in Gross Dölln, Galerie Hennwack, Berlin, Germany; The Krunchist Movement, Blaa Galleri, Copenhagen, Denmark; Between Waves, Blaa Galleri, Copenhagen, Denmark; 7 malen in Dölln. Ergebnisse eines Kuenstlertreffens, Kunstverein, Schwedt, Germany; Efter-Billeder, JANUS – Vestjyllands Kunstmuseum, Tistrup, Denmark; 20 x Testimony, Kunsthal, Vejle, Denmark
- 2020: Ohne Einschränkung: Kunst, Galerie subjectobject, Berlin, Germany; Lebenszeichen, Katholische Akademie, Schwerte, Germany; Art of Giving, SIRIN Copenhagen Gallery, Copenhagen, Germany; Efter-billeder, SAK i sammenarbejde med Vestjyllands Kunstmuseum, Svendborg, Denmark; Corona Confinement Blues, Blaa Galleri, Copenhagen, Denmark; By og Land, Galleri 2132, Roslev, Denmark
- 2019: Remix #6, galleri kunstmix, Copenhagen, Denmark; Kunst im August, Galerie subject object, Berlin, Germany; Plein Air, Glyngoere Kulturstation-Museum, Salling, Denmark; Remix #5, galleri kunstmix, Copenhagen, Denmark
- 2018: Remix #4, galleri kunstmix, Copenhagen, Denmark; URBAN 2018, Maerz contemporary, Molde, Norway; Remix #3, galleri kunstmix, Copenhagen, Denmark
- 2017: Remix #2, galleri kunstmix, Copenhagen, Denmark; Artgeschoss 2017, ARTGESCHOSS, Berlin, Germany; Aus der Natur, Kunstverein, Barsinghausen, Germany; Remix #1, galleri kunstmix, Copenhagen, Denmark; Spurensuche, Kunstverein, Schwedt, Germany; Sommer in Hamburg, Galerie des Hotels Grand Elysee, Hamburg, Germany; 3653 x JA, Galerie subject object, Berlin, Germany
- 2016: Die Farben des Winters, Museen im Kulturzentrum, Rendsburg, Germany; Die Farben des Winters, Kunsthaus Muellers, Rendsburg, Germany
- 2015: Erinnerung, Galerie Hengevoss-Duerkop, Hamburg, Germany; Sommersausstellung, Galerie Halbach, Celle, Germany
- 2014: Chill Out!, Galerie Hengevoss-Duerkop, Hamburg, Germany; Zimmer Frei, Museet paa Koldinghus, Kolding, Denmark; Wuk Exhibition Ubik Bueller-S Day Off, Ubic Space, Wien, Austria; Xzbit – Die Ausstellung, projekthaus, Hamburg, Germany; Acchrochage, Galerie Rose, Hamburg, Germany
- 2013: KurtSalon, Galerie Kurt im Hirsch, Berlin, Germany; Norddeutsche Realisten – Meinersen 2013 – Eine Bestandaufnahme, Kuenstlerhaus, Meinersen, Germany; Kunst am Bodden, Galerie der Farbrique, Gängeviertel, Hamburg, Germany; HEUTE,- Ultramarin, Galerie Hinterconti, Hamburg, Germany; Galore 2013, Valby Kulturhus, Copenhagen, Denmark; Kunst – Landschaft – Moelln neue Stadtansichten, Möllner Museum, Mölln, Germany; HEUTE,- Zitate und Zutaten, Galerie KUB, Leipzig, Germany; Kuenstler der Galerie, Kunsthaus Muellers, Rendsburg, Germany; Norddeutsche Realisten in Hohwacht, Kunsthaus Müllers, Rendsburg, Germany; Speicherplatz, Nullunendlich, Leipzig, Germany; HEUTE,- Groteske Wirklichkeit, Galerie affenfaust, Hamburg, Germany
- 2012: HEUTE,- Momente, Galerie Hafentor 7, Hamburg, Germany; Die Bionale – Zwischen Ackerbau und Hochkultur, Galerie der HFBK, Hamburg, Germany; Zeitgeist, Fabrik der Kuenste, Hamburg, Germany; Macht Spass, Galerie Raum linksrechts, Hamburg, Germany; Ideen von Landschaft, Jenisch Haus, Hamburg, Germany; Pappdemokratie, Künstlerhaus Vorwerkstift, Hamburg, Germany
- 2011: Heute, Kunsthaus Speckstrasse, Gängeviertel, Hamburg, Germany; Galore 2011 – Valby Kulturhus, Copenhagen, Denmark; Antlitz, Bildnis, Conterfey, Frappant, Hamburg, Germany
- 2010: Experiment 010 – Kulturforum Schwimmhalle Schloss, Ploen, Germany; Hamburger Stadtteile, Fabrik der Künste, Hamburg, Germany; Zeitgenössischer Mythos, Kunsthaus Speckstrasse, Gaengeviertel, Hamburg, Germany
- 2009: Cartel 21, Fabrik Gaengeviertel

== Publications ==
2012: Enfants Terribles Text: Till Bräuning. Publisher: Bräuning Contemporary, Hamburg, Germany ISBN 978-3-00-039981-7.

2014: Enfants Terribles – Kinder der Louise B. Text: Friedrich Holtiegel, Joachim Voß. Publisher: Kunstverein Barsinghausen, Germany ISBN 978-3-945527-00-9.

2015: Zeitbilder – Matvey Slavin. Text: Belinda Grace Gardner. Publisher: Irmgard Bösenberg, Meinersen, Germany ISBN 978-3-00-050176-0.

2015: Matvey Slavin – Katalog Hamburger Landschaften. Text: Matvey Slavin. Publisher: Akademiker Verlag, Germany ISBN 978-3-639-86498-4.

2015: Footwork Text: Kerstin Hengevoss-Dürkop, John Czaplicka, Matthias Schatz. Publisher: Galerie Hengevoss-Dürkop, Hamburg, Germany ISBN 978-3-00-049805-3.

2017: Aus der Natur – Nana ET Matvey + Maike Gräf Text: Friedrich Holtiegel. Publisher: Kunstverein Barsinghausen, Germany ISBN 978-3-945527-08-5.

2018: Matvey Slavin: Image Hunter. Foreword: Peter Klasvogt Text: Stefanie Lieb. Publisher: Katholische Akademie Schwerte, Germany ISBN 978-3-927382-76-3.

2019: Copenhagen Open Air: Matvey Slavin. Text: Tom Jørgensen. Publisher: kunstmix. Copenhagen, Denmark ISBN 978-87-93898-00-4.

2020: 101 kunstnere 2020/2021 Text: Nana Bastrup. pp. 180–181 Publisher: Frydenlund. Frederiksberg, Denmark ISBN 978-87-7216-255-3.
