= Nana Rosenørn Holland Bastrup =

Danish artist (born 1987)

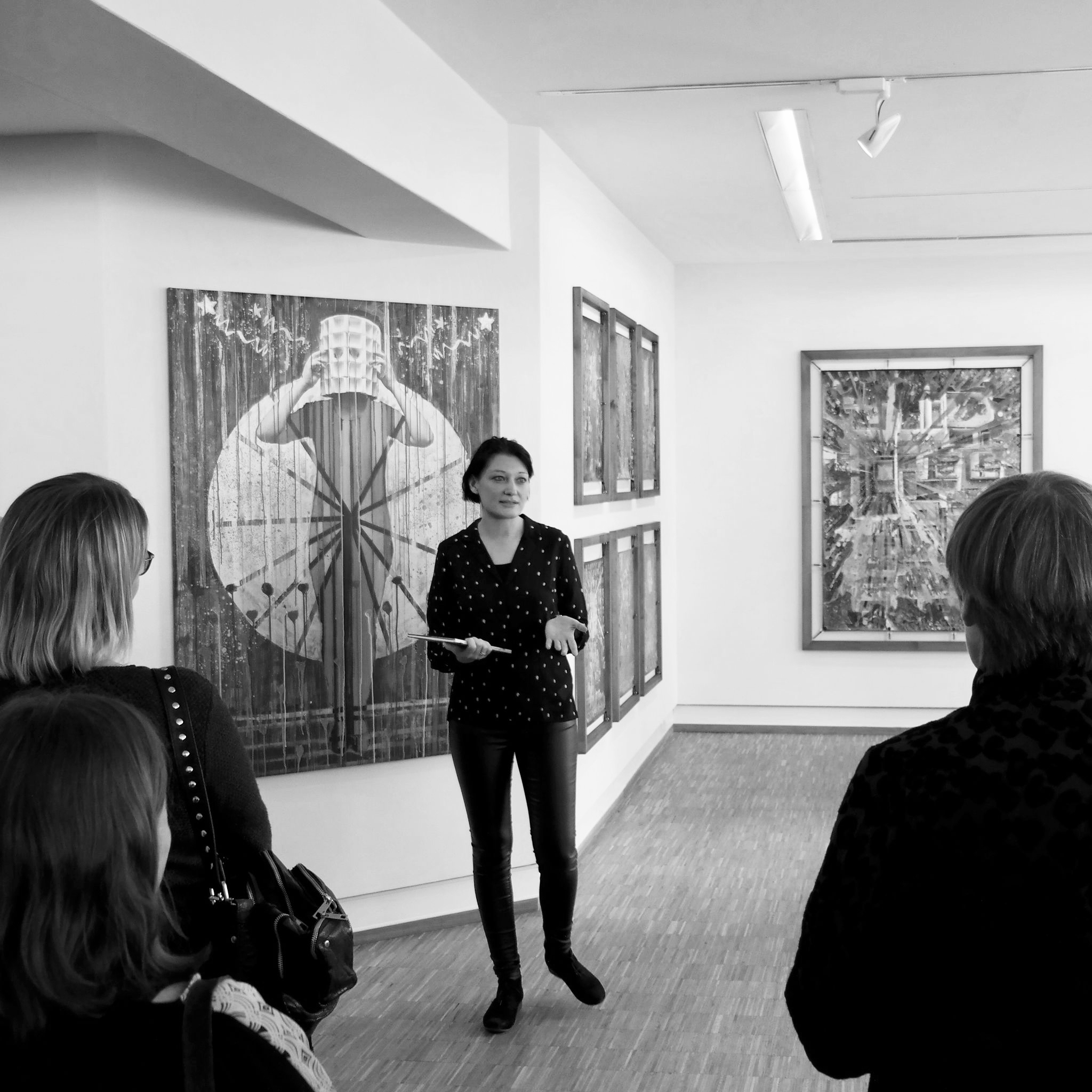
- Nana Rosenørn Holland Bastrup, 2019
- Born: 25 February 1987 (age 39); Copenhagen, Denmark
- Known for: collage; drawing; painting; video
- Movement: Popdada
- Spouse: Matvey Slavin
- Children: 2

Nana Rosenørn Holland Bastrup (25 February 1987 in Copenhagen) is a Danish artist. She lives and works in Copenhagen. She is a member of the artist duo Enfants Terribles and founder of Popdada.

== Education ==
She studied from 2010 to 2015, at University of Fine Arts of Hamburg among others by prof. Pia Stadtbäumer and in 2013 at Akademie der bildenden Künste Wien by prof. Florian Reither.

== Career ==
In 2014 and 2015, she became work grants at Künstlerhaus Meinersen with a scholarship of the Foundation Bösenberg (1 year), in 2016 at Künstlerhaus im Schlossgarten in Cuxhaven (6 months).

She has participated in happenings and exhibitions among others at Außenplateau der Hamburger Kunsthalle, Altonaer Museum, Museet på Koldinghus, Kunsthal Aarhus and in group shows with among others Vilmantas Marcinkevičius, Peter Ravn, Matvey Slavin, Enfants Terribles, Markus Vater. In 2020, she was exhibited in the Changwon Sculpture Biennale in South Korea.

== Publications ==
- Enfants Terribles (2012) Hamburg: Bräuning Contemporary. ISBN 978-3-00-039981-7.
- Enfants Terribles: Kinder der Louise B. (2014) Germany: Kunstverein Barsinghausen. ISBN 978-3-945527-00-9.
- Footwork (2015) Hamburg: Galerie Hengevoss-Dürkop. ISBN 978-3-00-049805-3.
- Aus der Natur: Nana ET Matvey + Maike Gräf (2017) Germany: Kunstverein Barsinghausen. ISBN 978-3-945527-08-5.
- Nana R. H. Bastrup: Polykrome Forklædninger (2019) Viborg: Galleri NB. ISBN 978-87-90832-13-1.
- Nana R. H. Bastrup: 99 Rememberings (2019) Copenhagen: Kunstmix. ISBN 978-87-93898-01-1.
