= Otto Heinrich Röttcher =

- Born: 7 November 1834; Müden (Aller), Germany
- Died: 27 December 1911 (aged 77); Muden, KwaZulu-Natal, South Africa
- Occupation: Missionary
- Known for: Town establishment. Making "wine" out of oranges
- Spouse: Marie Sophie Auguste Horst

Otto Heinrich Röttcher (7 November 1834 – 27 December 1911) was a missionary, established a town in South Africa and is known for making “wine“ out of oranges. He came from Müden (Aller), Germany to South Africa.

== Roots ==
He came to South Africa in 1862 on the ship Candace from Germany. He was first stationed at Hermannsburg, KwaZulu-Natal.

== Work life ==
As a missionary he was deployed in Midlands of KwaZulu-Natal, South Africa. He was a member of the Berlin Missionary Society. He worked under the Zulu nation.

He established a town in the Midlands of KwaZulu-Natal calling it Muden, KwaZulu-Natal, named after the town he came from in Germany. The town still exist today.

Because he needed wine for Holy Communion, the missionary in 1916 was forced to make “wine” from oranges, since no grapes were available. He established the Sonnegold Orange Winery. His son Heinrich Christoph Röttcher (b.10 Sep 1879, d.17 Oct 1958) continued his father's “wine”-making, which was handed over to his grandchild Karl Kurt Röttcher (b. 25 Aug 1910). Karl opened a formal business in 1959 called Röttcher Wineries, which is situated between Nelspruit and White River, Mpumalanga in the Lowveld, Eastern Transvaal, South Africa.

== Personal life ==
He married Marie Sophie Auguste Horst (15 September 1836 – 30 May 1922).
