= Leiferde bei Gifhorn station =

Railway station in Leiferde, Germany

Leiferde (b Gifhorn)

General information
- Location: Leiferde, Lower Saxony; Germany
- Coordinates: 52°27′23″N 10°25′41″E
- Line: Berlin–Lehrte railway
- Platforms: 2

Other information
- Station code: 3622
- DS100 code: HLFG
- Category: 6
- Fare zone: VRB: 17; GVH: E (VRB transitional tariff, monthly passes only)
Location

Leiferde (b Gifhorn) is a railway stop located in Leiferde, Germany. The station is located on the Berlin-Lehrte Railway. The train services are operated by Metronom.

== Train services ==
The station is serves by the following service(s):

- Regional services RE 30 Hannover–Lehrte–Gifhorn–Wolfsburg

Preceding station	Metronom	Following station
Meinersen towards Hannover Hbf	RE 30	Gifhorn towards Wolfsburg Hbf
