= Enfants Terribles (artists) =

Danish artist duo

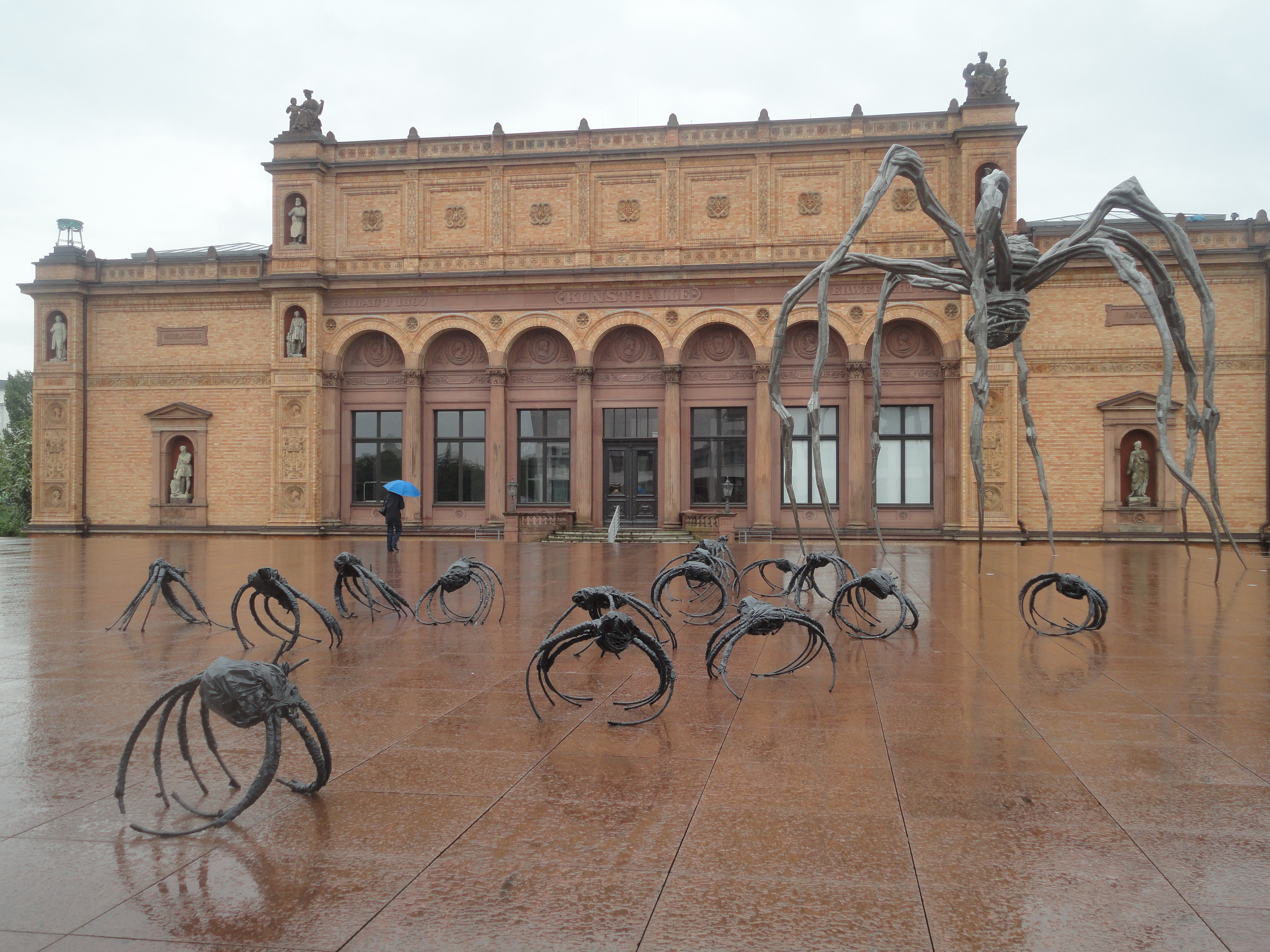
Installation Enfants Terribles: Baby spiders in front of Hamburger Kunsthalle

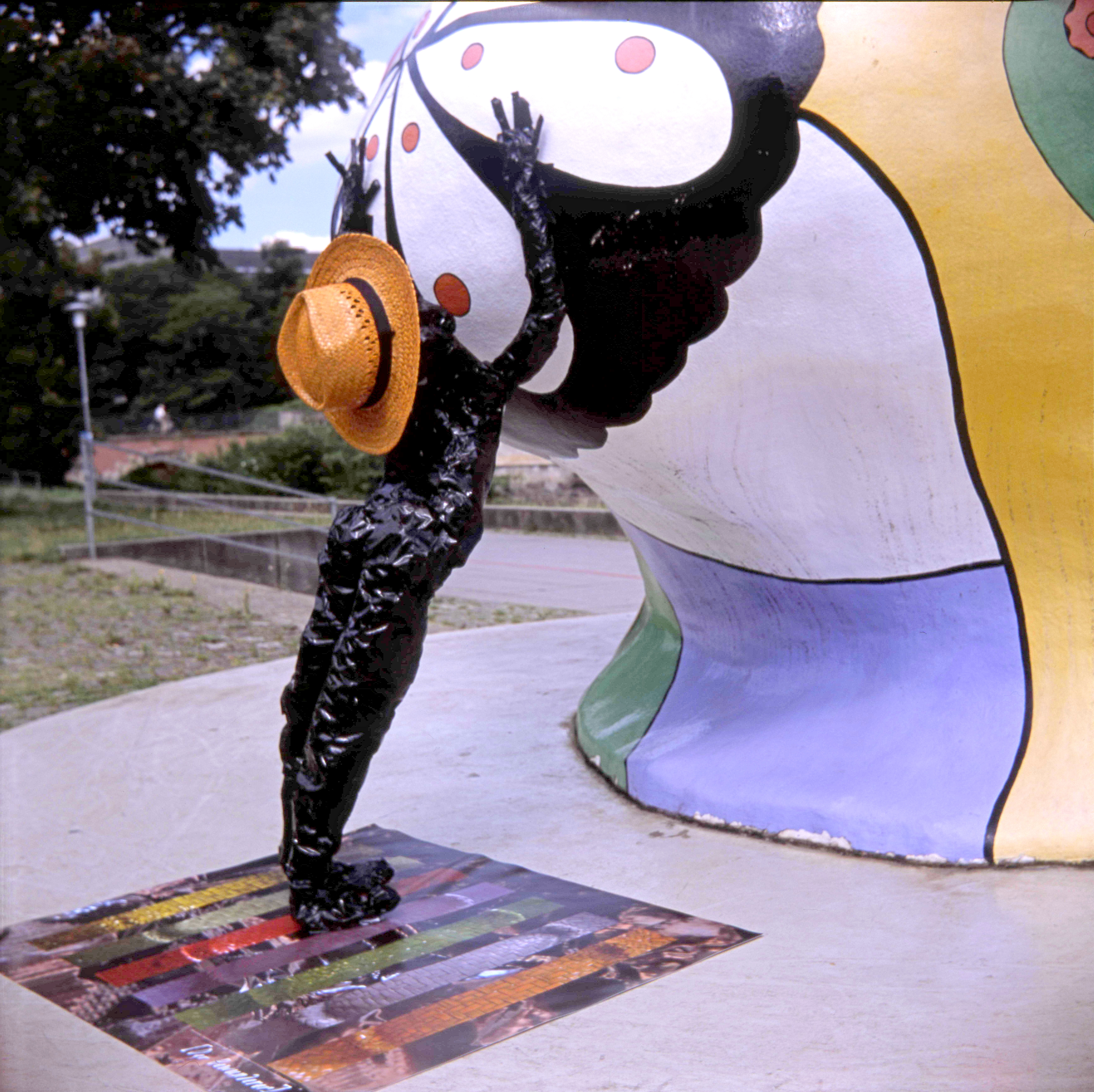
Black sculptures by the Nanas on the Leibnizufer in Hanover

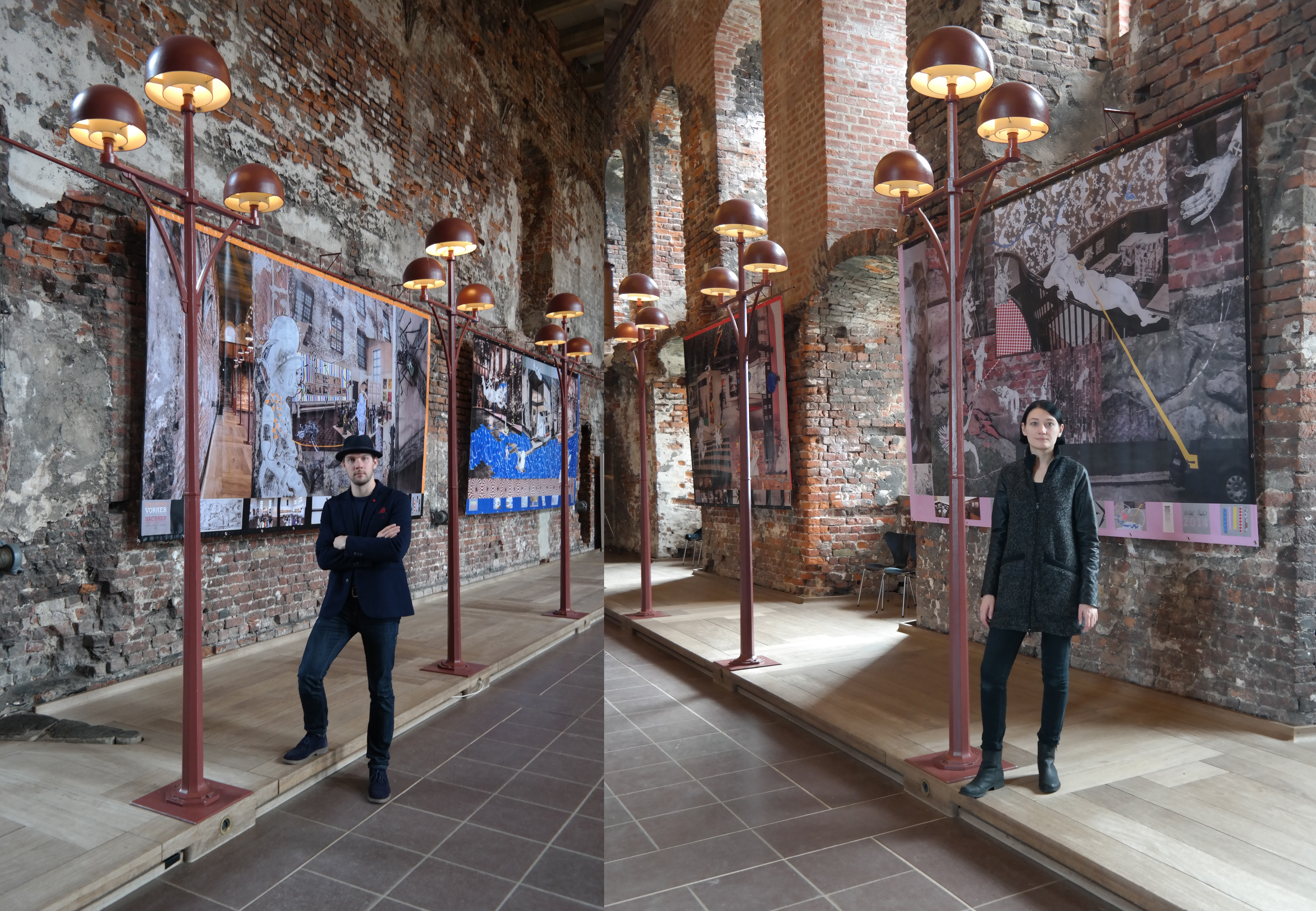
Nana ET Matvey (in the background Laufbilder - Digital Gobelins) Museet på Koldinghus, Kolding, Denmark

Enfants Terribles, also Nana ET Matvey, is an artist duo consisting of Nana Rosenørn Holland Bastrup (short: Nana Bastrup) (born 1987) and Matvey Slavin (born 1987). The duo was founded in Hamburg in 2012 and named after their installation Enfants Terribles which, in May 2012, was exhibited on the large paved area outside the Hamburger Kunsthalle in Hamburg. The installation Enfants Terribles was a homage to the spider sculpture Maman by Louise Bourgeois, and consisted of sixteen baby spiders around Bourgeois' existing sculpture.

== Life and education ==
Bastrup was born in Copenhagen, Denmark and Slavin was born in Leningrad (subsequently renamed St.Petersburg), Russia. They met while students at the Hochschule für bildende Künste Hamburg and have since produced a number of joint exhibitions and public actions in Germany, Denmark and Austria under the name "Enfants Terribles". In 2014-2015 they became artists-in-residence in the art house in Meinersen on a scholarship of the Foundation Bösenberg and in 2016 an artists-in-residence in the art house Künstlerhaus im Schlossgarten in Cuxhaven. Since 2015 they work under the name Nana ET Matvey in Berlin and Copenhagen.

== Work ==
Enfants Terribles' work builds on the Dada movement. Taboos are one of its main themes. In the year 2014 the performance artists put in Hanover seven little artificial figures called "The Seven Matveys" with colored hats in front of the Nana sculptures of Niki de Saint Phalle: The Admirer, The Critic, The Know-It-All, The Devotee, The Sceptic, The Tourist and The Destroyer. The performative installation was realized not only because of the first name of Nana Bastrup, but also because of the disputes about the art form in Hanover in the 1970s. The duo practices a type of pictorial satire that follows the tradition of artists Jacques Callot, William Hogarth, or George Grosz. In 2014 they invented a form of expression they called "Laufbilder". The method for producing these works is: inkjet prints of photographs of previous exhibitions or performances on recycling paper, collage interventions carried out by Nana Bastrup, and pencil drawings added by Matvey Slavin are united in prints on PVC tarp, leaving color test patterns visible on the bottom and side margins. This procedure results in the rendition of “digital Gobelins” which recall classic tapestries, but in reality are printed advertising banners with loops. The motto of the artist duo is art is footwork. The "Laufbilder" (running images or run of images) recreate views and situations of exhibitions that Enfants Terribles have realized in the past. The works deal with socially relevant issues and reflect critically the art market, the art scene, and the role the artists adopt in these. Bastrup and Slavin connect their art career, symbolic compounds of elements and grotesque situations. The cast of characters that populate the artist´works are drawn from their personal engagement with that art scene. In the exhibition Popdada in Berlin 2016 Bastrup and Slavin showed a selection of popdadaistic works: Laufbilder (motion pictures), Mauerwerke (masonry) and video sculpture Dada Child, Little Brother 2014-2016. The black lacquered child figure sitting on a plinth holds in one hand a screen with the video Popdada 2010-2016 near his face. In the other outstretched hand is a toy gun, which he aims with. With the exhibition the artists named and founded the art form Popdada (also Popdadaism) - 100 years after the founding of Dada (also Dadaism). The intention of the popdadaistic concept is not to question the world for its conventionality and to parody, but because of the banality and manipulation.

== Duo exhibitions and public performances ==
- 2012:
  - Hamburg: Enfants Terribles, Installation on the plateau of Hamburger Kunsthalle
  - Hamburg: Mensch und Ware, Altonaer Museum
- 2013:
  - Berlin: Inszenierte Träume I/II, Galerie Kurt im Hirsch
  - Berlin: Inszenierte Träume II/II, Galerie Kurt im Hirsch
  - Roskilde: Viking Revival, Galleri LABR
- 2014:
  - Barsinghausen: Enfants Terribles - Kinder der Louise B., Kunstverein Barsinghausen e.V.
  - Hanover: Matveys, Installation by the Nanas on the Leibnizufer
  - Hamburg: Enfants Terribles - Laufbilder & Videoskulpturen, Galerie Hengevoss-Dürkop
- 2015:
  - Meinersen: Kribbel-Krabbel, Künstlerhaus Meinersen
- 2016:
  - Asnæs: Enfants Terribles, Huset I Asnæs
  - Cuxhaven: Wir sind soweit, Künstlerhaus im Schlossgarten
  - Cuxhaven: Cuxhavener Kuriositäten, Künstlerhaus im Schlossgarten
  - Berlin: Popdada, Galerie subject-object

== Group exhibitions ==
- 2013:
  - Berlin: KurtSalon mit Jim Avignon, Kathrin Ganser, Sophie Schmidt, Sarah Strassmann u.a. Galerie Kurt im Hirsch, Berlin
- 2014:
  - Kolding: Zimmer Frei Museet på Koldinghus

== Interdisciplinary Projects and Collaborations ==
In an interdisciplinary project, Matvey Slavin and Nana Bastrup collaborated as ENFANTS TERRIBLES, creating the so-called Laufbilder as digital tapestries and video sculptures. These works inspired choreographer Jessica Nupen for her performance art piece ENFANTS TERRIBLES. The performance took place on November 10, 2014 at the Galerie Hengevoss-Dürkop in Hamburg, as part of the eigenarten Interkulturelles Festival 2014.

== Bibliography ==
- Hengevoss-Dürkop, Kerstin; Czaplicka, John; Schatz, Matthias (2015). Enfants Terribles – Footwork. Hamburg: Gallery Hengevoss-Dürkop. ISBN 978-3-00-049805-3.
- Holtiegel, Friedrich; Voß, Joachim (2014). Enfants Terribles. Kinder der Louise B. Barsinghausen: Kunstverein Barsinghausen e.V. ISBN 978-3-945527-00-9.
