= Ncome Monument and Museum Complex =

Coordinates: 28.1054°S 30.5463°E

Battle of Ncome River
- Part of the Great Trek
Location in Kwazulu-Natal
Date	16 December 1838
Location	Ncome river, KwaZulu-Natal, South Africa

Belligerents
Voortrekkers	Zulu Kingdom

Commanders and leaders
Andries Pretorius; Sarel Cilliers	Dambuza; Ndlela kaSompisi and Dingane

The Ncome Monument and Museum Complex is a heritage museum and memorial site located near Nquthu in the Umzinyathi District Municipality in KwaZulu-Natal, South Africa. The complex, located on the eastern bank of the Ncome River commemorates the Battle of Ncome River (1838). The site is intended to present an alternative perspective to a political myth known as the Battle of Blood River, which involved a conflict between Dutch speaking migrants (pioneers) and Zulu tribes.

== Origins and Architecture ==
Conceptualised by the "Battle of Blood River Reinterpretation Committee", the Ncome Monument and Museum Complex was opened in 1999 by Mr Lionel Mtshali and/or King Goodwill Zwelithini. The monument and complex adopts architectural and landscape form to offer a contrasting account to the once dominant Voortrekker perspective. The museum building is designed in the shape of bulls horns which reflects the military formation practiced by Zulu impi (regiments) known as the "horns of the buffalo" (izimpondo zankomo). The design incorporates curved forms that symbolize the pincer movement of the battle formation.

== Reconciliation and Symbolism ==
A prominent feature of the complex is the Isivivane, a symbolic stone cairn / isivavane representing remembrance, reconciliation, and nation-building. The interpretive sign (in capital letters) directs visitors: "YOU ARE REQUESTED TO THROW A STONE AT THE CAIRN IN ORDER TO FULFILL THE OBJECTIVE OF UNITING THE NATION." Another prominent feature is the Reconciliation Bridge, which was built in 2013, by the Department of Arts and Culture, (now the Department of Sport, Arts and Culture) and unveiled by Jacob Zuma, on the 20th anniversary of the National Day of Reconciliation.

The bridge was intended to act as a link between the blood River Monument to the Ncome Museum Complex. Theoretically, the structure is supposed to serve as a physical and symbolic connection between the two heritage sites. However, reconciliation is not simple and the Reconciliation Bridge has been shut, due to funding issues around maintenance or due to operational reasons.
