= Calberlah station =

Railway station in Calberlah, Germany

Calberlah
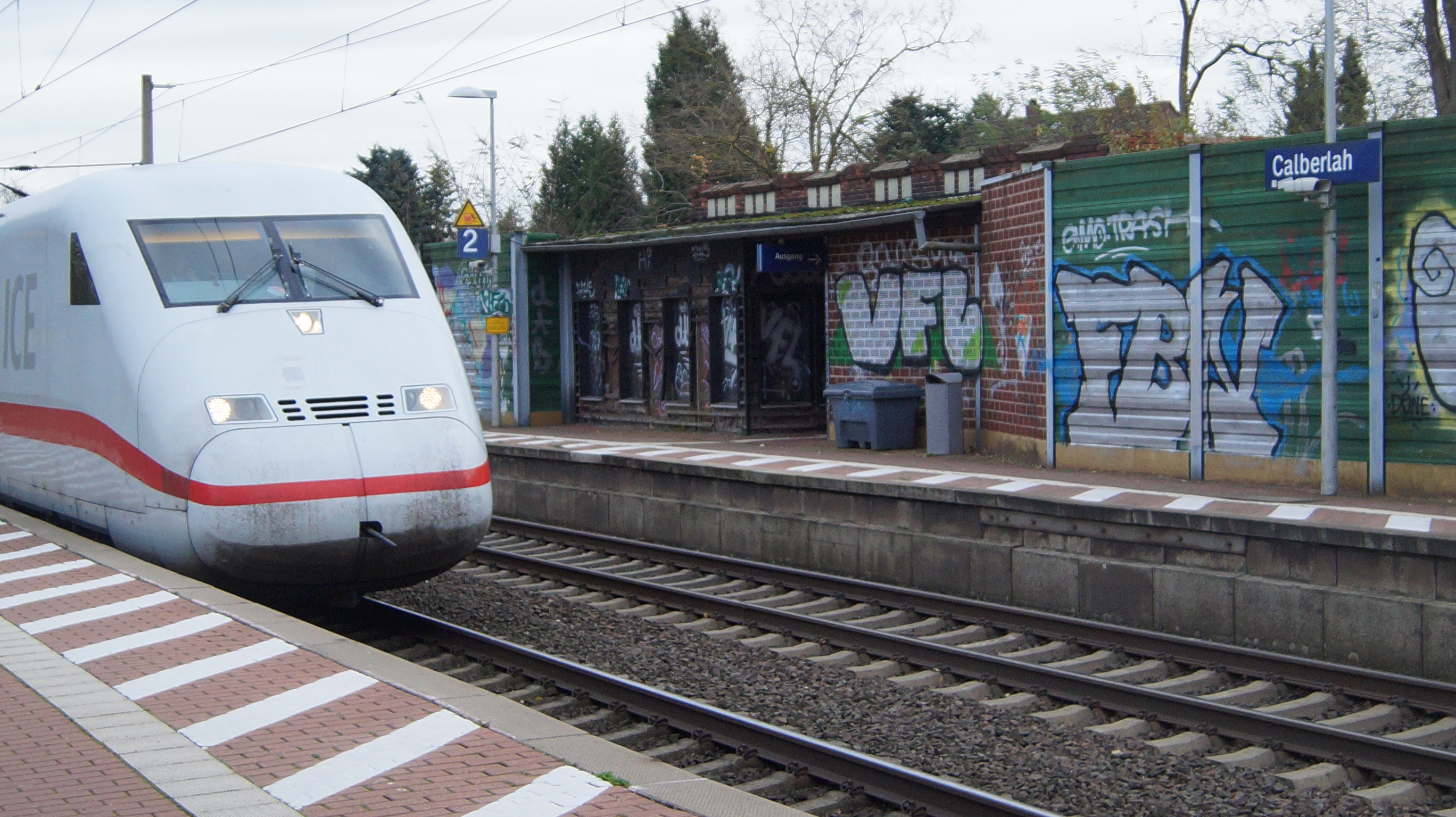
- Calberlah station

General information
- Location: Calberlah, Lower Saxony; Germany
- Coordinates: 52°25′39″N 10°37′30″E
- Line: Berlin–Lehrte railway
- Platforms: 2

Other information
- Station code: 1022
- DS100 code: HCAL
- Category: 6
- Fare zone: VRB: 16; GVH: F (VRB transitional tariff, monthly passes only)
Location

Calberlah (German: Bahnhof Calberlah) is a railway station located in Calberlah, Germany. The station is located on the Berlin-Lehrte Railway. The train services are operated by Metronom.

== Train services ==
The station is serves by the following service(s):

- Regional services RE 30 Hannover - Lehrte - Gifhorn - Wolfsburg

Preceding station	Metronom	Following station
Gifhorn towards Hannover Hbf	RE 30	Fallersleben towards Wolfsburg Hbf
