= Müden (Mosel) =

- Municipality
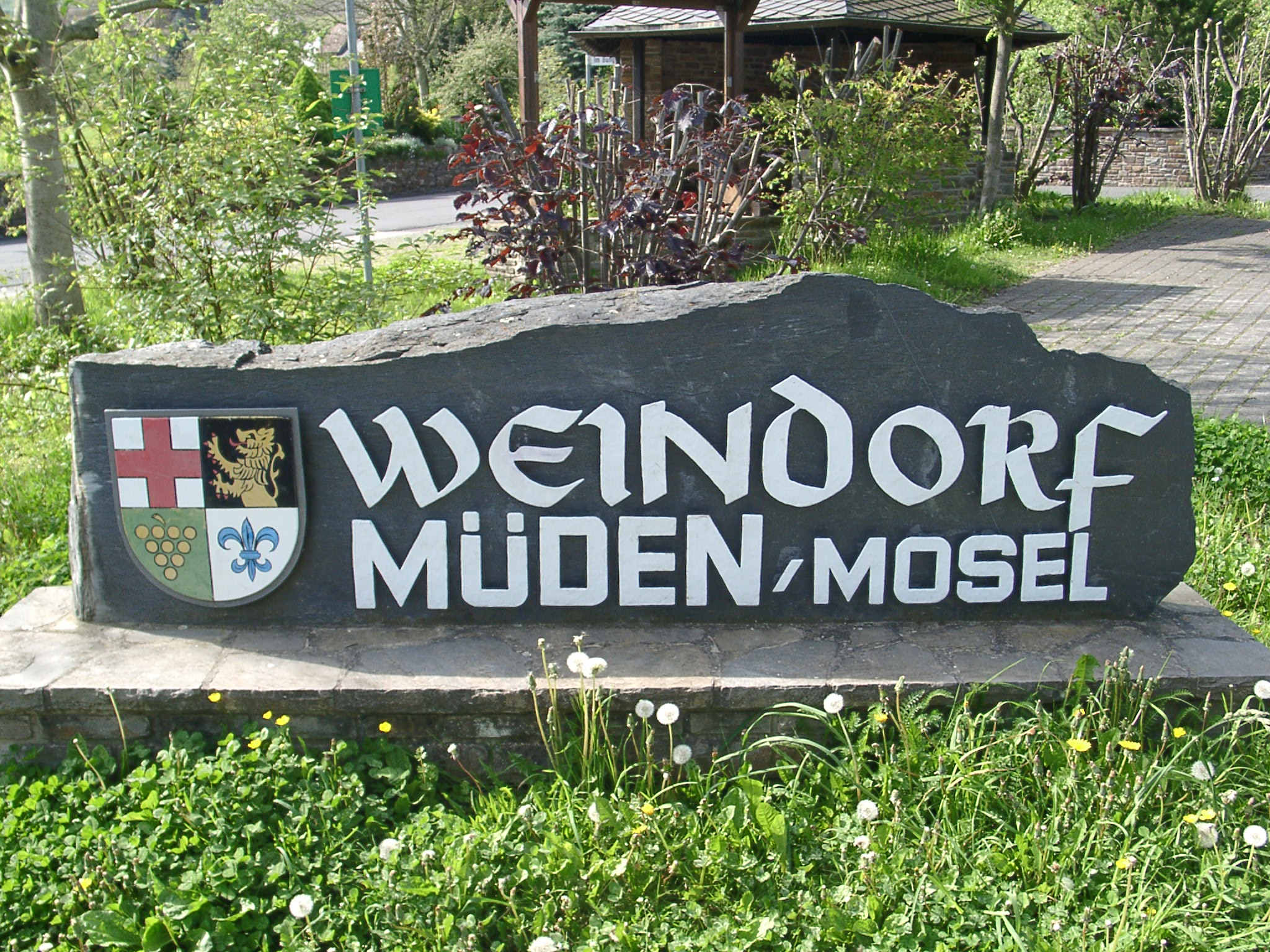

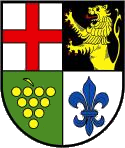
- Coat of arms

- Location of Müden (Mosel) within Cochem-Zell district
- Interactive map of Müden (Mosel)
- Location within Germany Location within Rhineland-Palatinate
- Coordinates: 50°11′12″N 7°20′25″E
- Country: Germany
- State: Rhineland-Palatinate
- District: Cochem-Zell
- Municipal assoc.: Cochem

Government
  - Mayor (2019–24): Franz Oberhausen

Area
  - Total: 7.49 km^{2} (2.89 sq mi)
- Elevation: 90 m (300 ft)

Population (2025-12-31)
  - Total: 652
  - Density: 87.0/km^{2} (225/sq mi)
- Time zone: UTC+01:00 (CET)
  - Summer (DST): UTC+02:00 (CEST)
- Postal codes: 56254
- Dialling codes: 02672
- Vehicle registration: COC
- Website: www.mueden-mosel.de

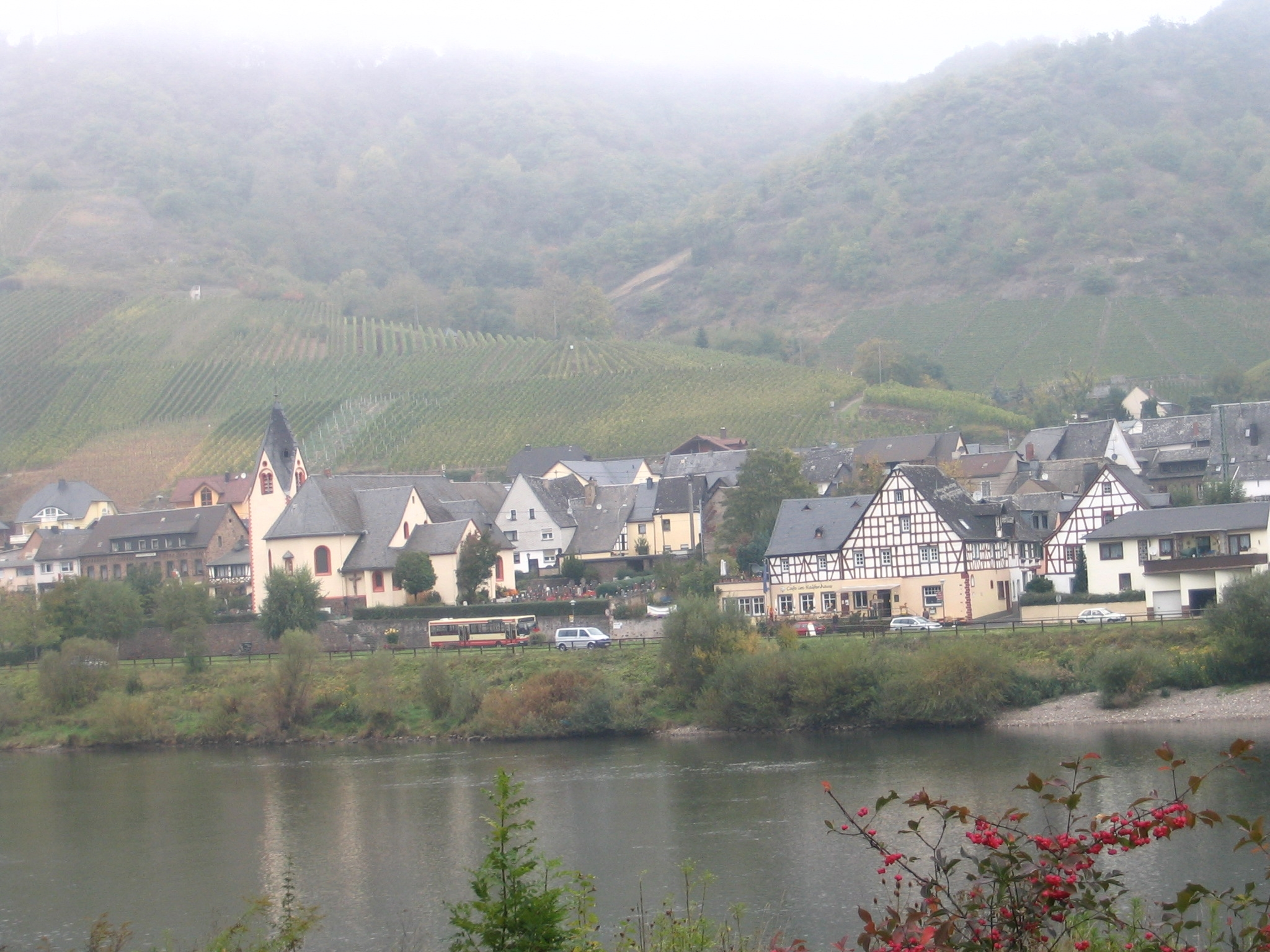
Müden an der Mosel

Müden (German pronunciation: [ˈmyːdn̩]) is an Ortsgemeinde – a municipality belonging to a Verbandsgemeinde, a kind of collective municipality – and a tourism resort in the Cochem-Zell district in Rhineland-Palatinate, Germany. It belongs to the Verbandsgemeinde of Cochem.

== Geography ==
=== Location ===
Müden lies within the winegrowing country on the sunny side of the Moselle valley. It borders in the north on the Eifel and in the south on the Moselle, with the Hunsrück over the other side. The wine, the Moselle, which has been built into a major navigable waterway, and the nearby castle, Burg Eltz, lend the place a special character.

=== Constituent communities ===
Also belonging to the municipality, whose main centre is also called Müden, is the outlying centre of Müdenerberg with a sporting ground, a composting lot and a chapel.

== History ==
A Roman settlement of Celtic origin, called Modinum, is known from many archaeological finds. The village had its first documentary mention about 585. Trier's centuries-long lordship ended with the occupation of the lands on the Rhine’s left bank by French Revolutionary troops in 1794. In 1815 Müden was assigned to the Kingdom of Prussia at the Congress of Vienna. After the Second World War, Müden belonged to the French zone of occupation. Since 1946, it has been part of the then newly founded state of Rhineland-Palatinate.

== Politics ==
=== Municipal council ===
The council is made up of 12 council members, who were elected by proportional representation at the municipal election held on 7 June 2009, and the honorary mayor as chairman.

The municipal election held on 7 June 2009 yielded the following results:

	CDU	WG Möntenich	Total
2009	7	5	12 seats

In 2004, the election was based on a majority vote system.

=== Mayor ===
The mayor of Müden is Franz Oberhausen.

=== Coat of arms ===
The German blazon reads: Das Wappen der Ortsgemeinde Müden ist ein geviertelter Schild. Oben enthält er vorne ein rotes Kreuz in Silber und hinten in schwarzem Feld einen halben goldenen rotbewehrten Löwen. Unten ist es vorne eine goldene Traube in grünem Feld und hinten eine blaue Lilie in silbernem Feld.

The municipality's arms might in English heraldic language be described thus: Quarterly, first argent a cross gules, second sable a demilion Or armed and langued gules, third vert a bunch of ten grapes, four, three, two and one, slipped of the fourth, and fourth argent a fleur-de-lis azure.

The Electoral-Trier cross stands for Mudhena’s allegiance to the Electorate of Trier beginning in 1100. Trier was also lord of the court in Müden. The Bishop’s Estate and the Carthusian Estate of Trier held lands and rights in Müden. The Eltz lion refers to the extensive holdings in Müden of the Lords of Eltz. They owned wineries, estates and one tithing estate. The gold bunch of grapes on a green field refers to winegrowing’s 2000-year history in Müden. From a donation document from Childebert II’s time (575-595), it is apparent that the church at Verdun drew its sacramental wine from Müden. In the Middle Ages, many ecclesiastical and secular lords had extensive vineyard holdings here. The fleur-de-lis appears in a seal of the Karden Collegiate Foundation from the 13th century. Beginning in 1178, the Foundation drew tithes from Müden. It was also the biggest landholder.

=== Town partnerships ===
Müden fosters partnerships with the following places:

- (Germany) Müden, Gifhorn district, Lower Saxony
- (Germany) Müden, Celle district, Lower Saxony

== Culture and sightseeing ==
=== Buildings ===
The following are listed buildings or sites in Rhineland-Palatinate’s Directory of Cultural Monuments:

==== Müden (main centre) ====
- Saint Stephen’s Catholic Church (Kirche St. Stephan), Kirchstraße 2 – Romanesque “diamond tower”, about 1200, quire Late Gothic, vaulted, nave 1923; whole complex with graveyard; here: cross, 1939; wayside cross, marked 1708; 24 grave crosses, 17th and 18th centuries; seven cross fragments, 18th and 19th centuries; warriors’ memorial; 18 grave crosses, 18th century; cross, marked 1678; two grave crosses; five crosses, among them some from 1573, 1582 and the 18th century; wayside cross, marked 1722
- Bachstraße 4 – door, early 19th century
- Burg-Eltz-Straße 2, Hauptstraße 21 – former winery of the Counts of Eltz; timber-frame house, partly solid, balloon frame, 16th century
- Hauptstraße 12 – estate with enclosed courtyard; three timber-frame houses, partly solid, marked 1638, 1664 (timber framing from the 16th century), 1774
- Hauptstraße 22/24 – two three-floor timber-frame houses, partly solid, no. 22 dendrochronologically dated to 1452/1453, no. 24 about 1490
- Hauptstraße 27 – timber-frame house, partly solid, marked 1671, possibly older
- Hauptstraße 28 – timber-frame house, partly solid, marked 1744
- Hauptstraße 37 – basalt wayside cross, marked 1705
- Hauptstraße 43 – Baroque relief, late 17th century
- Hauptstraße 44 – timber-frame house, partly solid, marked 1614 and 1722; addition at the back, 17th century
- Hauptstraße 51 – Baroque relief, marked 1671, in brick stele, 19th century
- Hauptstraße/corner of Hochkreuz – basalt wayside cross, 1699
- Moselstraße 1 – Halfenhaus (house for a tenant who owed the landlord half his earnings); timber-frame building, partly solid, half-hipped roof, marked 1658 (?) and 1738, possibly rather from the 18th century
- Moselstraße 5 – timber-frame house, partly solid, half-hipped roof, marked 1665 and 1784 (conversion)
- Schulstraße 2 – quarrystone house, marked 1871; whole complex
- Silberstraße 24 – cellar portal, 16th or 17th century
- Silberstraße/corner of Hauptstraße – chapel, 19th century, Gothic Revival Crucifixion group
- Speichstraße 5 – timber-frame house, partly solid, 18th century
- Speichstraße 8 – timber-frame house, partly solid, marked 1610, possibly rather from the late 17th century
- In the middle of the second Way of the Cross – burying ground from the Migration Period
- Brick chapel, marked 1895, Gothic Revival figures; Stations of the Cross, brick, stele type with relief, 1895
- Osterhof – chapel, 19th century
- Relief, marked 1680
- Wayside chapel, Marian chapel, 1875; pietà, 18th century
- Wayside cross – basalt, marked 1884

==== Müdenerberg ====
- Chapel; quarrystone aisleless church, marked 1856

=== Sport ===
The football teams SV Grün-Weiß Müden and FSV "Eltz" Moselkern together form SG Müden/Moselkern, which in the 2010–11 season played in the Bezirksliga. The team is coached by former Bundesliga professional Frank Hartmann.

== Economy and infrastructure ==
=== Transport ===
Müden lies on the Moselle line and is served throughout the day at least hourly by Regionalbahn trains. The nearest long-distance railway station with IC and Intercity-Express service is Cochem station. Müden also lies on Bundesstraße 416.

=== Local businesses ===
In Müden, several handicraft and small businesses can be found, in among other fields, roofing, baking, painting, surface construction and barbering and hairdressing. There is also a filling station in the village. Nearby stands an RWE Power AG hydroelectric power station.

=== Tourism ===
In Müden are several hotels and inns. Yearly, on the first weekend in August, the Bachelors’ Fair (Junggesellenkirmes) is held. Since 2010, Müden has been part of the cycling adventure day called Happy Mosel. Müden also serves as a starting point for hikes on the Buchsbaumwanderpfad (“Box Hiking Trail”).

== Famous people ==
Houses once occupied by Johannes Peter Müller and Joseph Görres and their families still stand in the municipality today (the latter is known as the Görreshaus). Friedrich Erxleben, a Catholic priest, and also a Nazi régime opponent, was once the parish priest. He was visited here by Federal President Theodor Heuss (West Germany’s first president) in 1949, and by Carl Zuckmayer. Father Erxleben is also buried in Müden.
