= Mooi River (Tugela) =

Coordinates: 28°45′46″S 30°34′7″E

Mooi Mooirivier, Mpofana
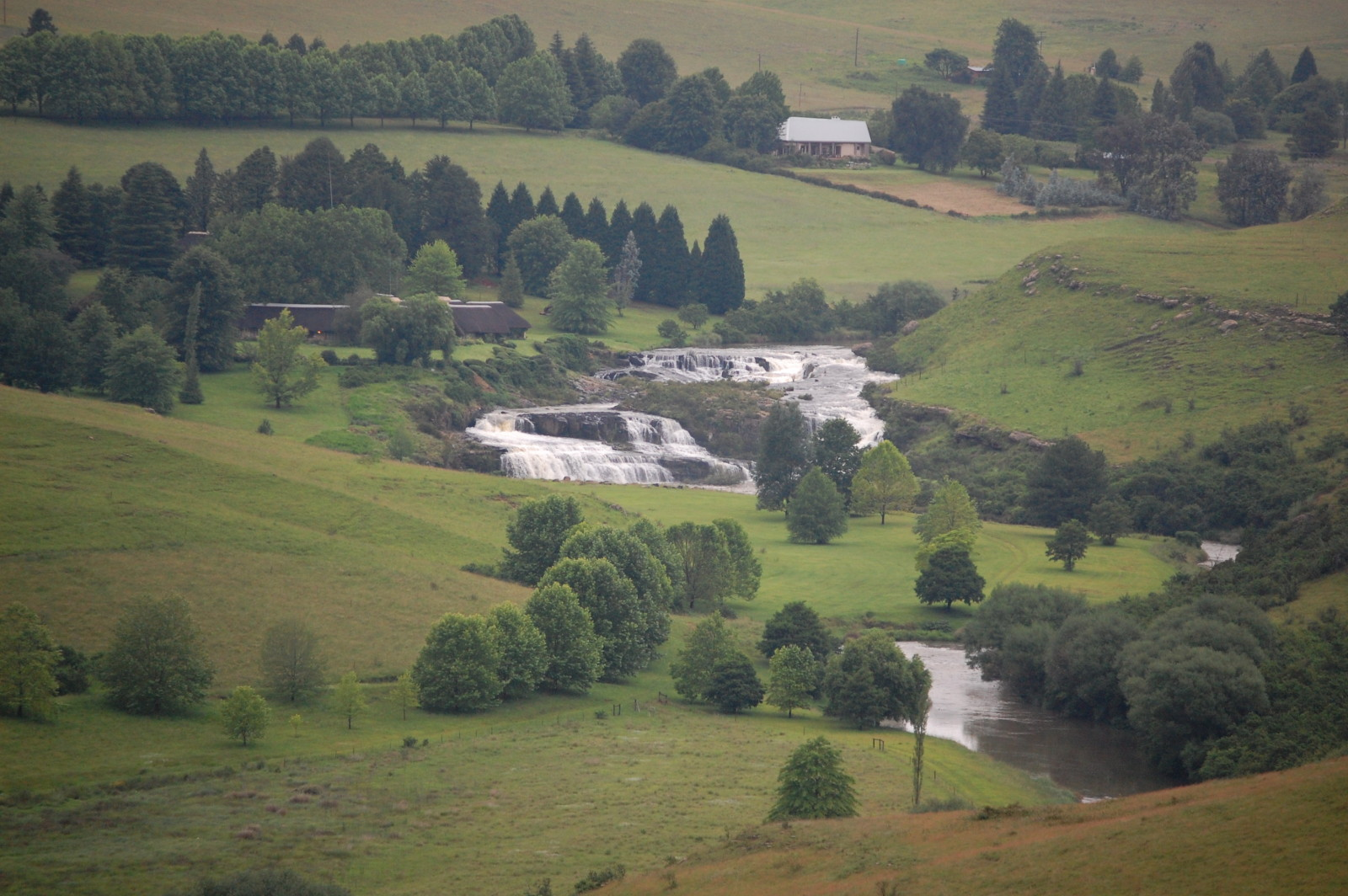
- Cascades on the Mooi River in the Rosetta region of KwaZulu-Natal.

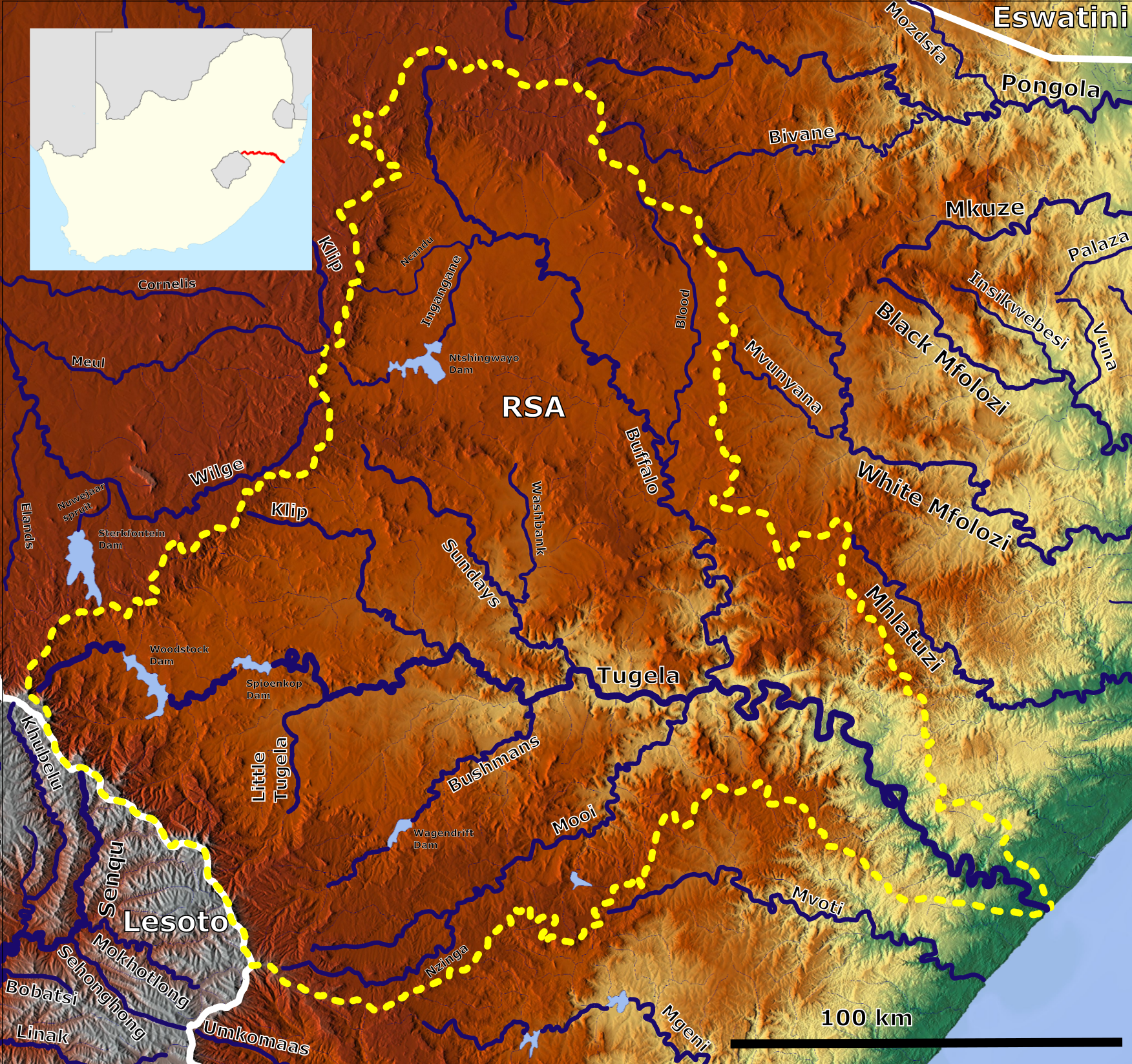
- The Mooi River in the Tugela catchment area (bottom center)
- Etymology: Mooirivier meaning 'pretty river' in Afrikaans; Mpofana or Mpafana meaning either 'little eland', 'the greyish one' or 'wild mulberry tree' in the Zulu language

Location
- Country: South Africa
- Province: KwaZulu-Natal
- Towns: Mooi River

Physical characteristics
- Source
  - location: Mkomazi Nature Reserve
- Mouth: Tugela River

The Mooi River is a river in KwaZulu-Natal Province, South Africa. It rises in the Mkomazi Nature Reserve in the Drakensberg Mountains, and empties into the Tugela River near Muden. The town of Mooi River lies on the river.

== Name ==
The name derives from the Dutch Mooirivier, i.e. pretty river, as it was named by the Voortrekkers in the mid-19th century. The river's Zulu name, Mpofana, means 'young eland'.

== See also ==
- Mooi River (town)
- Tugela River
