= Isivivane =

An isivivane is a stone cairn, or pile of rocks, in South Africa, which traditionally is found among the Zulu, Xhosa and San people. These beacons once played a role as a memorial, landmark or denoted a place of spiritual significance. Translated from isiZulu, isivivane means to “throw your stone upon the pile”. Local custom requires that travellers find a rock, spit on it, and then add it to the pile of stones. The act of throwing a stone, is one of respect and honours the sacred location and/or the historical sites. Isivivane /cairns, were found throughout the South African countryside, especially along old well-known and well-used footpaths. A well known isivivane is located between Weenen and Muden, at the intersection of two footpaths. The town of Weenen also has an old Voortrekker cemetery with a cairn, presumably to commemorate the Weenen massacres of 1838, when over 500 Afrikaner early migrants (Voortrekkers) were massacred in Doringkop, Bloukrans River, Moordspruit and Rensburgspruit The Isandlwana Battlefield also has a number of white painted cairns, which mark string of burial sites of fallen British soldiers along the buffalo river (also known as Fugitive's Drift),as well as making visible, points of conflict on the battlefield.

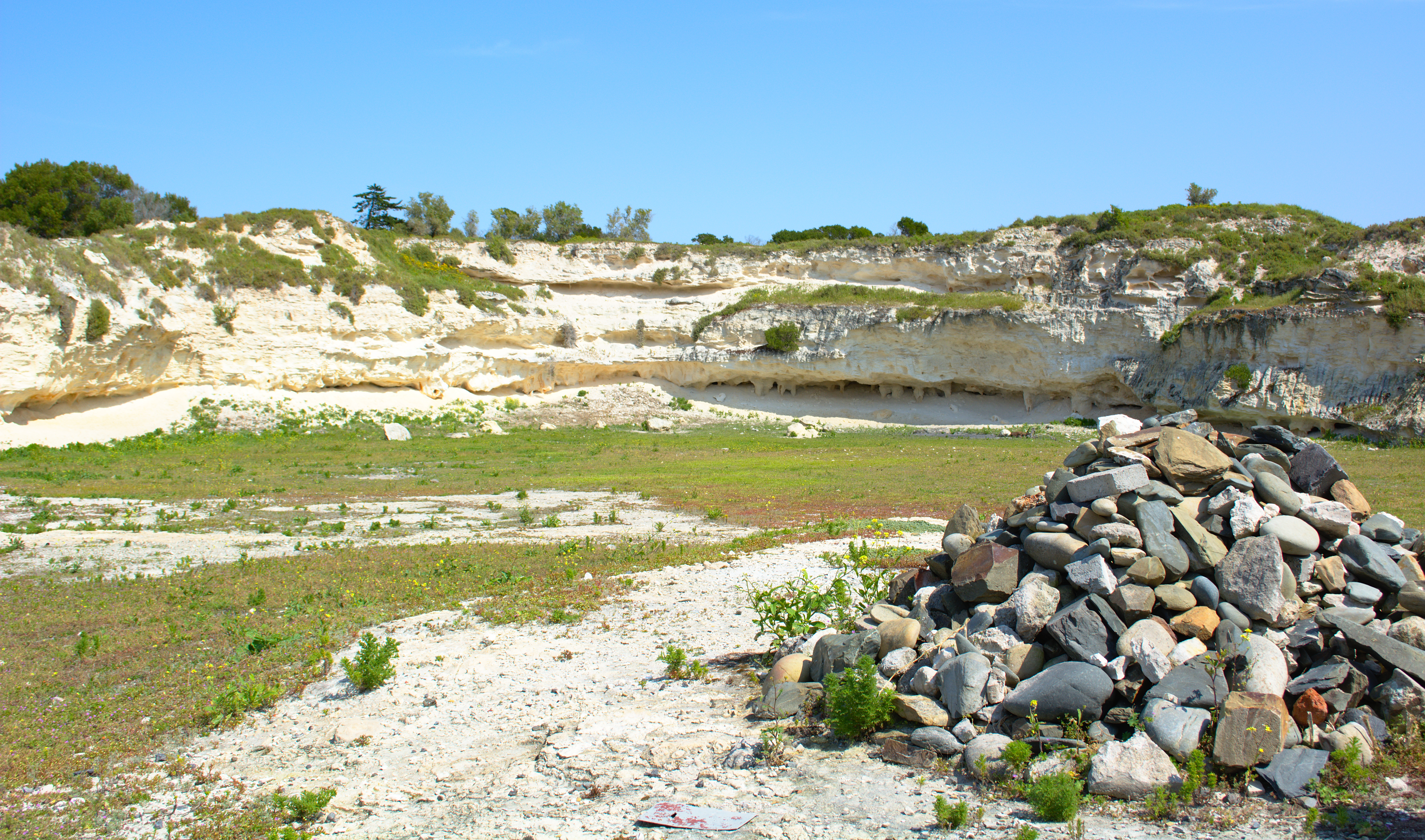
A Isivivane on Robben Island

Today, the most well known isivivane /cairn is found in the limestone quarry on Robben Island. There is also a memorial place in Freedom Park in the City of Tshwane, known as Lesaka (which is an isivivane) intended as a symbolic burial ground for heroes. Here, landscape designers suggest that the park and the concept of isivivane can be used to evoke a sense of place and argue that the 11 cairns can address the challenges that face post apartheid South Africa.The cairn at Ncome Museum is also intended to promote reconciliation among South Africans. Cultural institutions have adopted cairns as a cross cultural symbol of peace and reconciliation.
