= Fallersleben station =

Railway station in Wolfsburg, Germany

Fallersleben
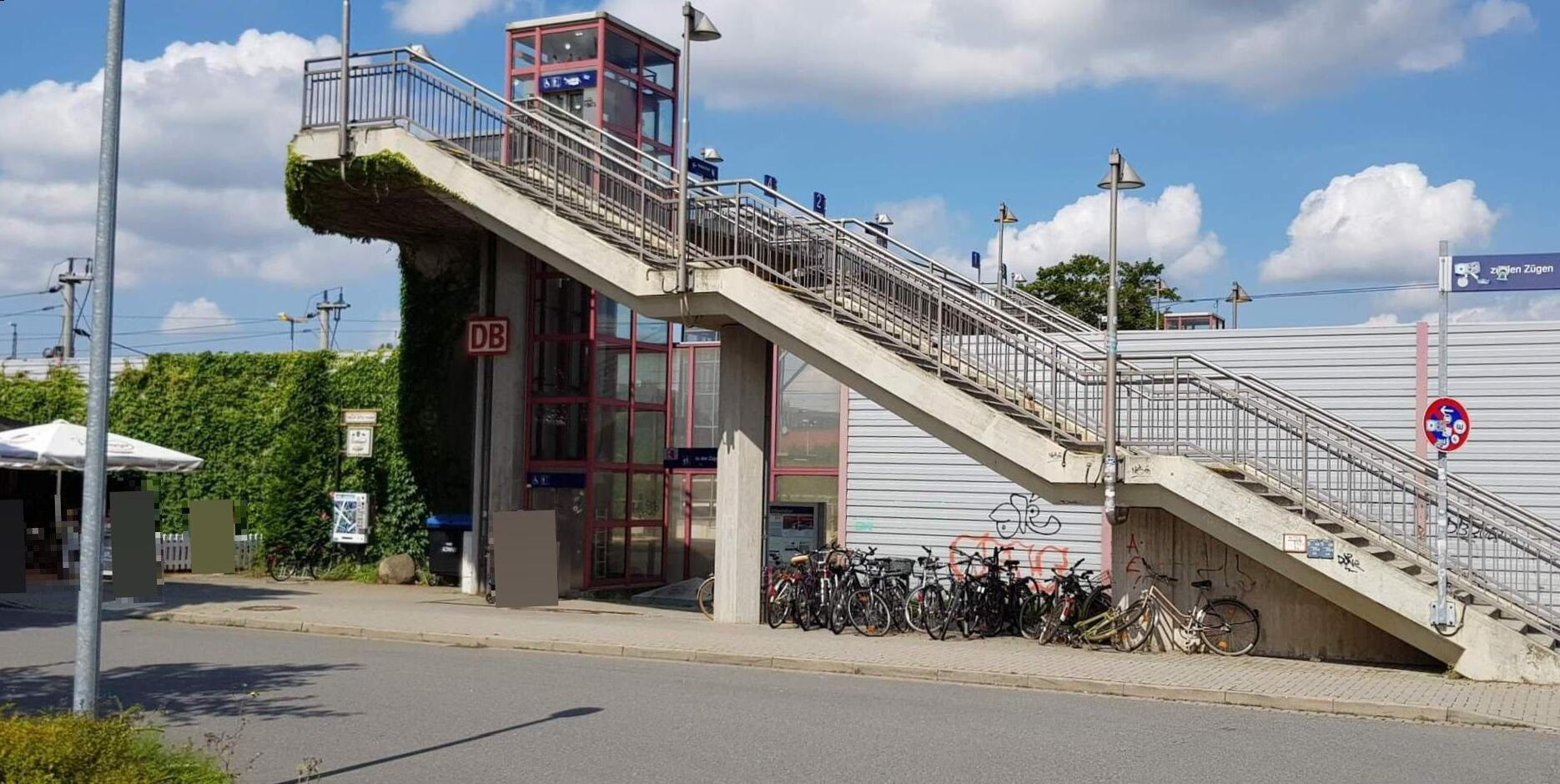
- Fallersleben station

General information
- Location: Wolfsburg-Fallersleben, Lower Saxony; Germany
- Coordinates: 52°25′24″N 10°43′02″E
- Owner: Deutsche Bahn
- Operator: DB Station&Service
- Line: Berlin–Lehrte railway
- Platforms: 4

Other information
- Station code: 1759
- DS100 code: HF
- Category: 5
- Fare zone: VRB: 20
- Website: www.bahnhof.de

Services
Preceding station	Metronom	Following station
Calberlah towards Hannover Hbf	RE 30	Wolfsburg Hbf Terminus
Weddel towards Hildesheim Hbf	RE 50	Wolfsburg Hbf Terminus
Location
- Location within Lower Saxony

Fallersleben (German: Bahnhof Fallersleben) is a railway station located in Wolfsburg, Germany. The station is located on the Berlin-Lehrte Railway. The train services are operated by Enno, a brand of Metronom.

== Train services ==
The station is serves by the following service(s):

- Regional services RE 30 Hannover - Lehrte - Gifhorn - Wolfsburg
- Regional services RE 50 Hildesheim - Braunschweig - Wolfsburg
