= Gifhorn station =

Railway station in Gifhorn, Germany

Gifhorn
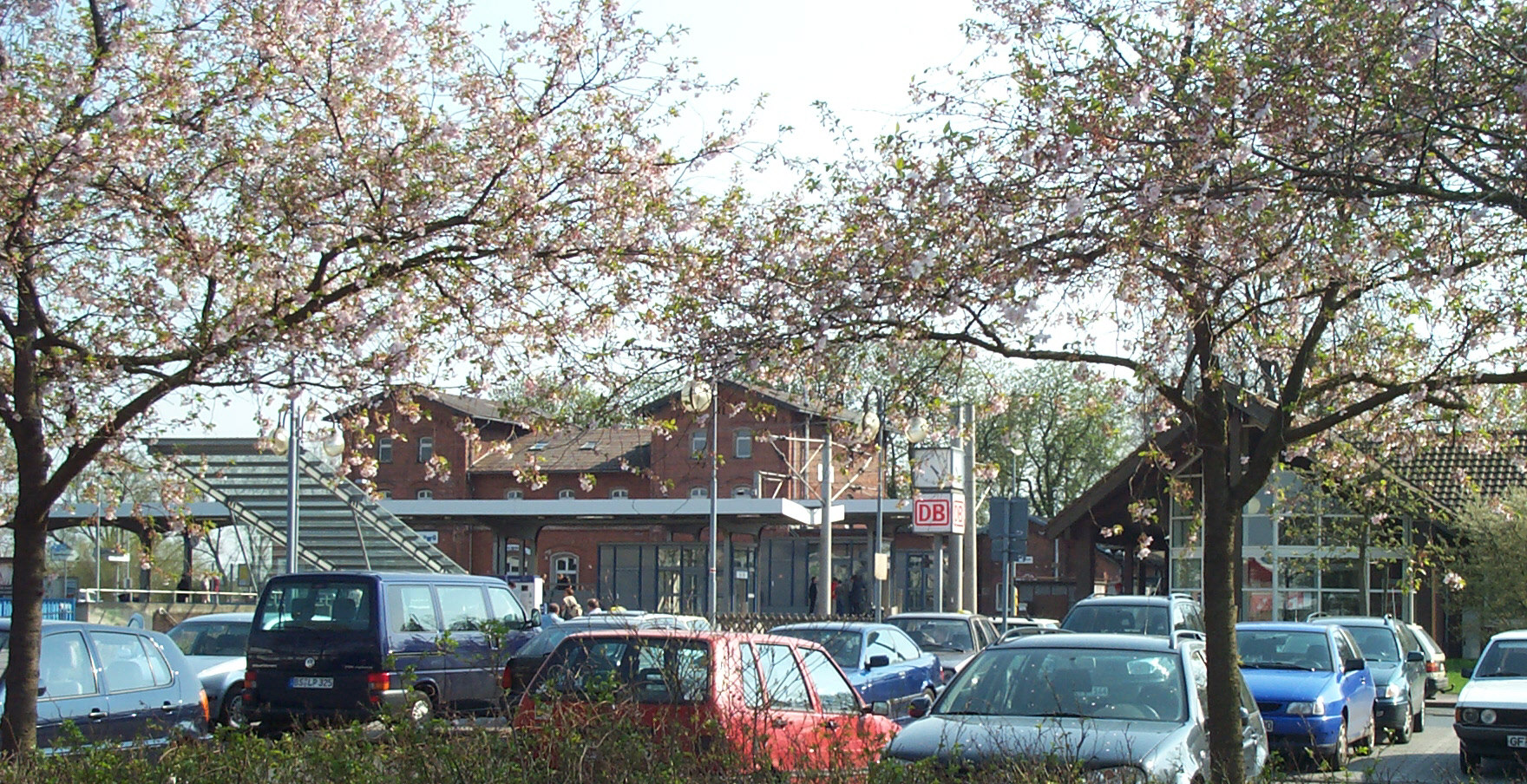
- Gifhorn railway station

General information
- Location: Gifhorn, Lower Saxony; Germany
- Coordinates: 52°27′22″N 10°32′44″E
- Line: Berlin–Lehrte railway
- Platforms: 5

Other information
- Station code: 2122
- DS100 code: HGI
- Category: 4
- Fare zone: VRB: 10; GVH: F (VRB transitional tariff, monthly passes only)

Services
| Preceding station | Metronom | Following station |
|---|---|---|
| Leiferde towards Hannover Hbf | RE 30 | Calberlah towards Wolfsburg Hbf |
| Preceding station | | Following station |
| Gifhorn Stadt towards Uelzen | RB 47 | Rötgesbüttel towards Braunschweig Hbf |
Location

Gifhorn (German: Bahnhof Gifhorn) is a railway station located in Gifhorn, Germany. The station is located on the Berlin-Lehrte Railway and Braunschweig-Uelzen railway. The train services are operated by Metronom and Erixx. Gifhorn has a second station, closer to the centre, Gifhorn Stadt.

== Train services ==
The station is serves by the following service(s):

- Regional services RE 30 Hannover - Lehrte - Gifhorn - Wolfsburg
- Local services RB 47 Uelzen - Wittingen - Gifhorn - Braunschweig
