= Hillerse =

- Municipality
- Coat of arms

- Location of Hillerse within Gifhorn district
- Interactive map of Hillerse
- Location within Germany Location within Lower Saxony
- Coordinates: 52°25′N 10°24′E
- Country: Germany
- State: Lower Saxony
- District: Gifhorn
- Subdivisions: 2 Ortsteile

Government
  - Mayor: Detlef Tanke (SPD)

Area
  - Total: 24.09 km^{2} (9.30 sq mi)
- Elevation: 64 m (210 ft)

Population (2025-12-31)
  - Total: 2,486
  - Density: 103.2/km^{2} (267.3/sq mi)
- Time zone: UTC+01:00 (CET)
  - Summer (DST): UTC+02:00 (CEST)
- Postal codes: 38543
- Dialling codes: 05373
- Vehicle registration: GF
- Website: www.hillerse.de

Hillerse is a municipality in the district of Gifhorn, in Lower Saxony, Germany. It is a member municipality of the Samtgemeinde Meinersen. The Municipality Hillerse includes the villages of Hillerse and Volkse.

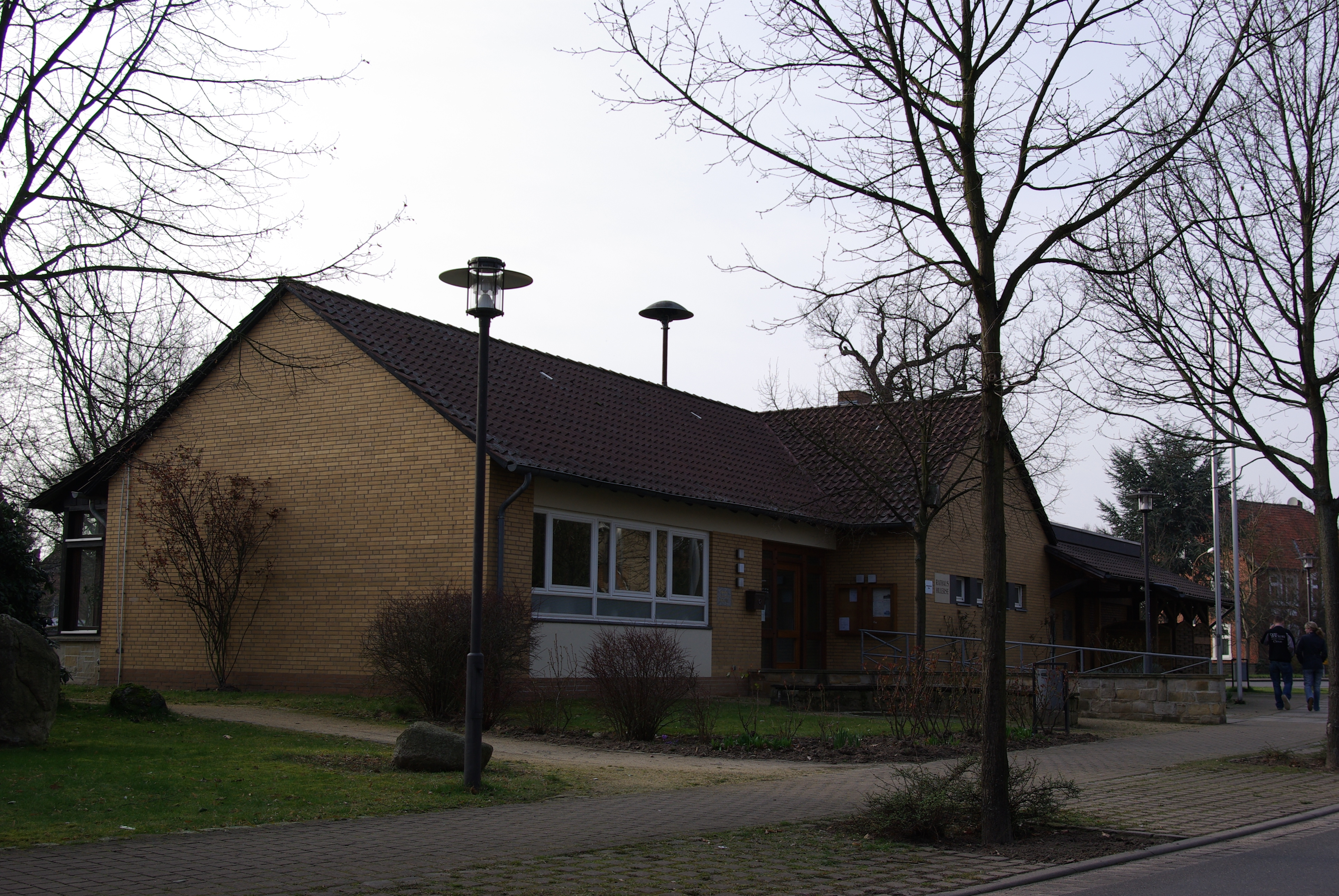
The Townhall

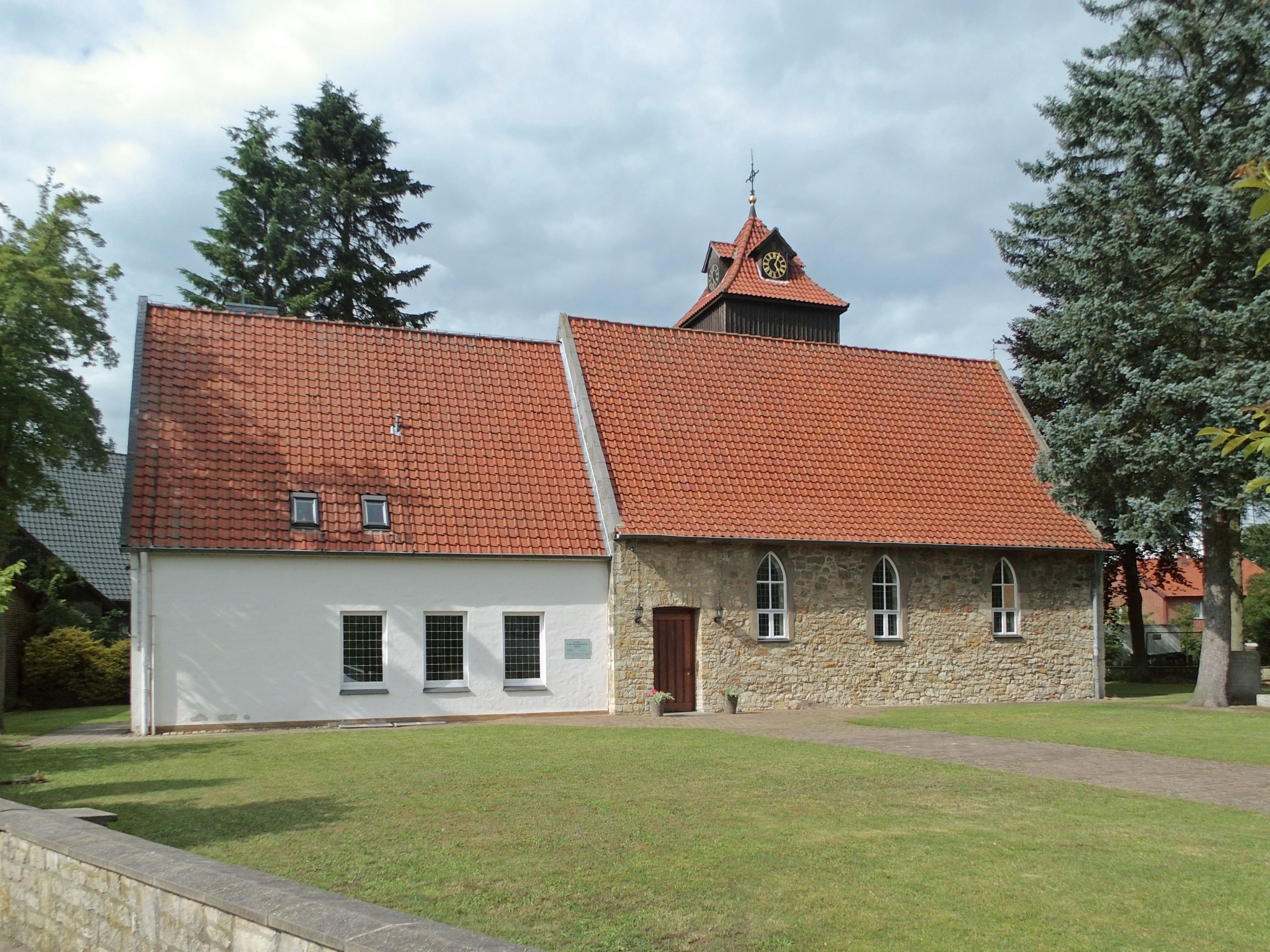
Lutheran church

== Twin towns ==
Hillerse is twinned with Bréville-les-Monts and Amfreville both in Calvados in France, and with Dolton in Devon in the UK.
