= Meinersen (Samtgemeinde) =

- Samtgemeinde
- Location of Meinersen within Gifhorn district
- Interactive map of Meinersen
- Location within Germany Location within Lower Saxony
- Coordinates: 52°28′N 10°22′E
- Country: Germany
- State: Lower Saxony
- District: Gifhorn

Government
  - Mayor (2021–26): Karin Single

Area
  - Total: 173.09 km^{2} (66.83 sq mi)
- Elevation: 52 m (171 ft)

Population (2025-12-31)
  - Total: 19,838
  - Density: 114.61/km^{2} (296.84/sq mi)
- Time zone: UTC+01:00 (CET)
  - Summer (DST): UTC+02:00 (CEST)
- Dialling codes: 05371
- Vehicle registration: GF
- Website: SG-Meinersen.de

Samtgemeinde Meinersen is a Samtgemeinde in the district of Gifhorn, in Lower Saxony, Germany. It is situated approximately 8 km (5 mi) southwest of Gifhorn. 20,311 citizens are living in the Samtgemeinde Meinersen (2020).

== Structure of the Samtgemeinde Meinersen ==
Structure of the Samtgemeinde
Municipality	Population (As of 31 Dec 2003)	Area (km²)	Population density (/km²)	Villages
Hillerse	2,731	24.11	113	Hillerse, Volkse
Leiferde	4,335	27.88	155	Leiferde, Dalldorf
Meinersen	8,415	53.83	156	Ahnsen, Böckelse, Hardesse, Höfen, Meinersen, Ohof, Päse, Seershausen, Warmse
Müden	5,579	67.27	83	Bockelberge, Brenneckenbrück, Diekhorst, Ettenbüttel, Flettmar, Gerstenbüttel, Gilde, Müden
