= Meinersen =

- Municipality
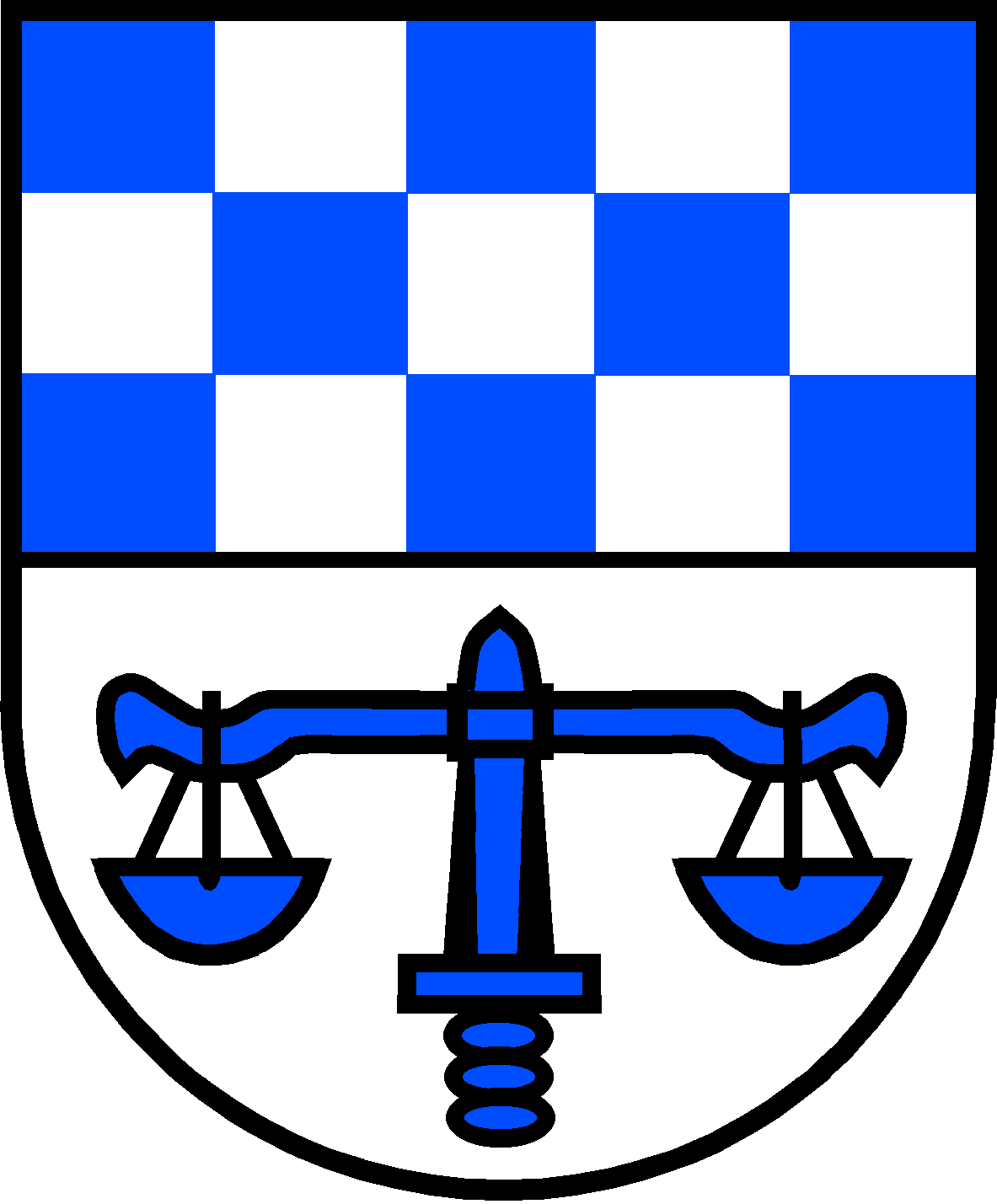
- Coat of arms

- Location of Meinersen within Gifhorn district
- Interactive map of Meinersen
- Location within Germany Location within Lower Saxony
- Coordinates: 52°28′22″N 10°21′39″E
- Country: Germany
- State: Lower Saxony
- District: Gifhorn
- Municipal assoc.: Meinersen

Government
  - Mayor: Thomas Spanuth (CDU)

Area
  - Total: 53.83 km^{2} (20.78 sq mi)
- Elevation: 52 m (171 ft)

Population (2025-12-31)
  - Total: 7,971
  - Density: 148.1/km^{2} (383.5/sq mi)
- Time zone: UTC+01:00 (CET)
  - Summer (DST): UTC+02:00 (CEST)
- Postal codes: 38536
- Dialling codes: 05372
- Vehicle registration: GF
- Website: www.meinersen.de

Meinersen is a municipality in the district of Gifhorn, in Lower Saxony, Germany. It is situated between the rivers Oker and Aller, approx. 12 km west of Gifhorn, and 25 km southeast of Celle. The Municipality Meinersen includes the villages of Ahnsen, Böckelse, Hardesse, Höfen, Hünenberg, Meinersen, Ohof, Päse, Seershausen, Siedersdamm and Warmse.

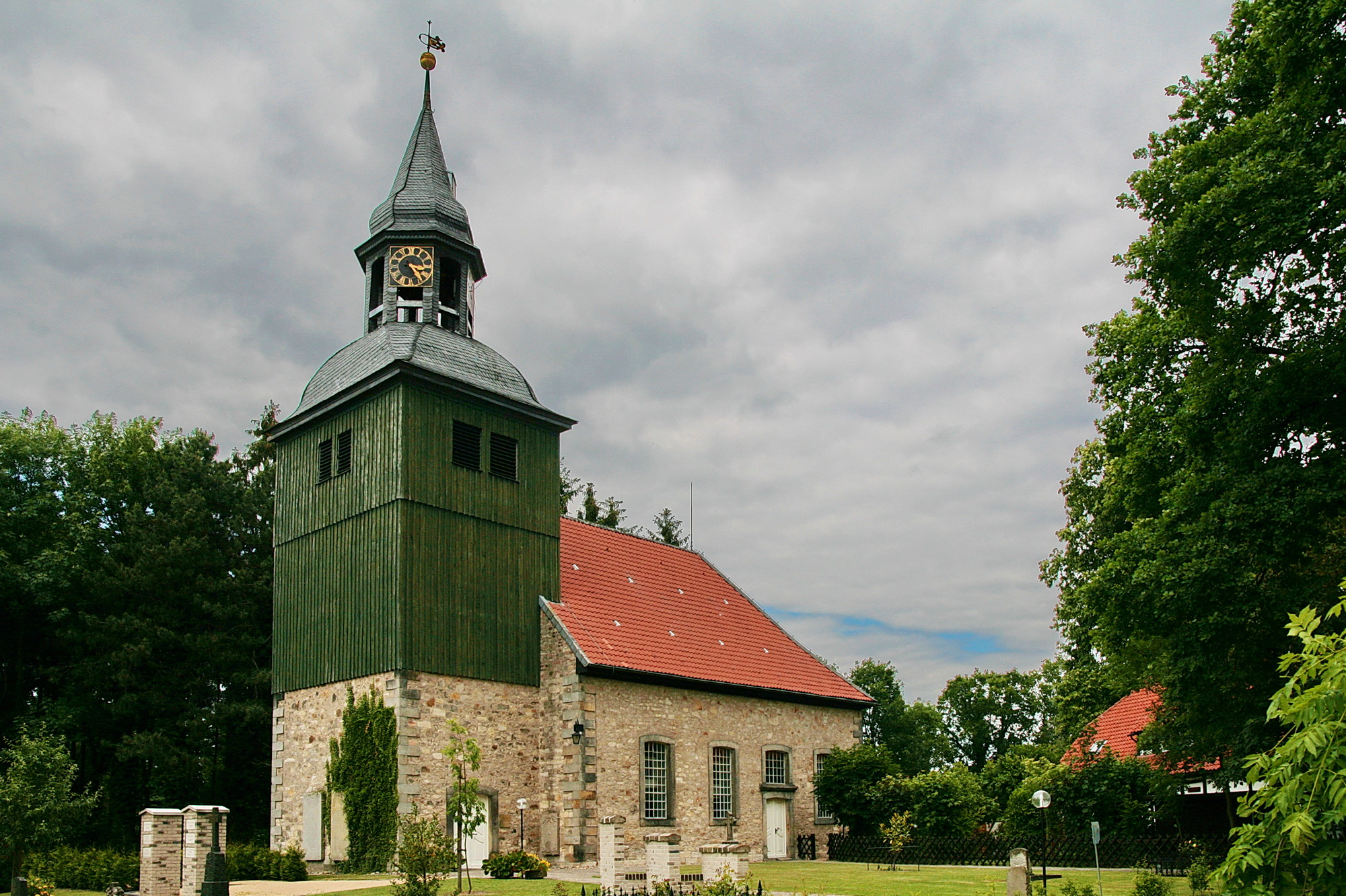
The lutheran church

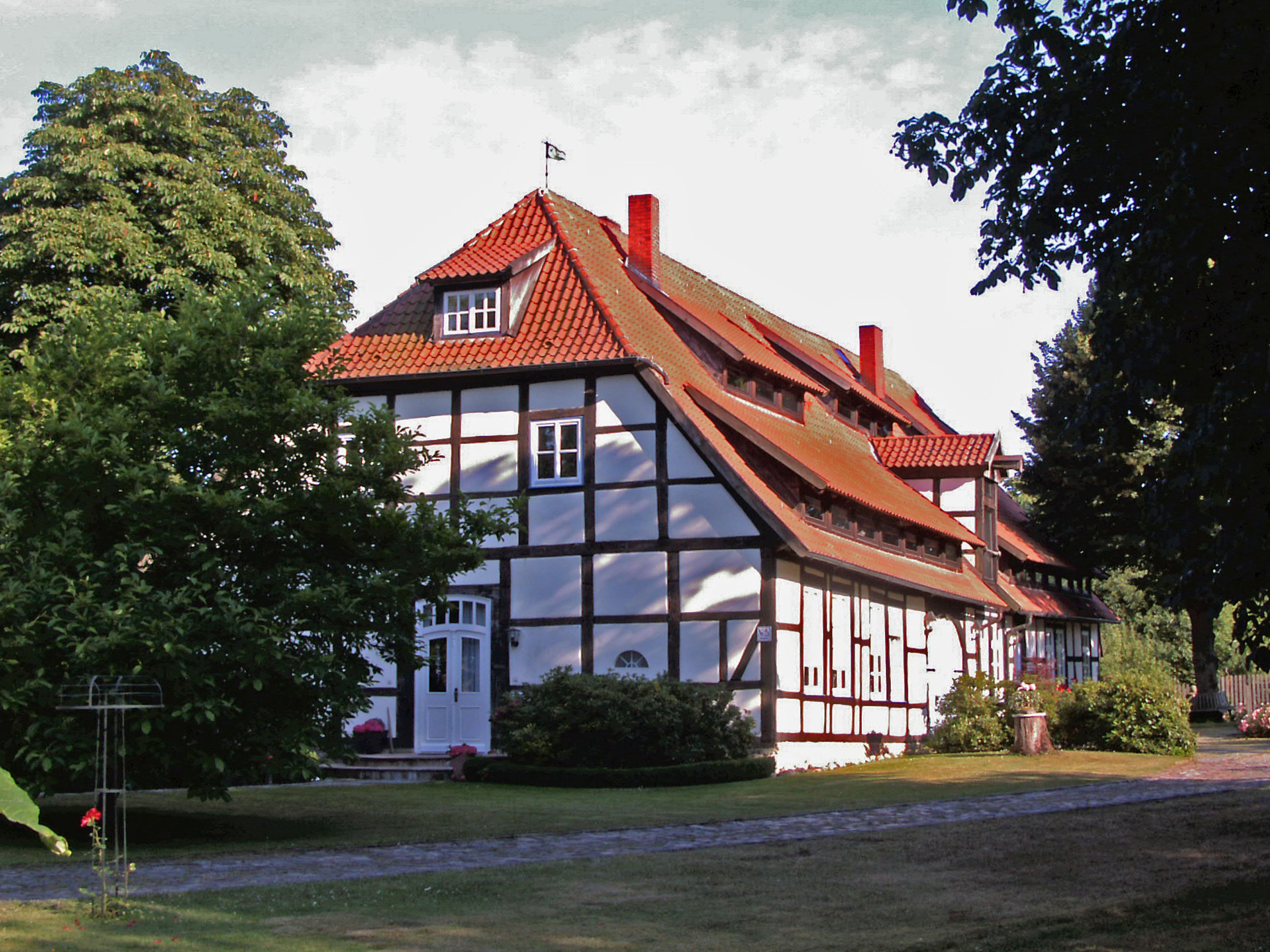
Old court

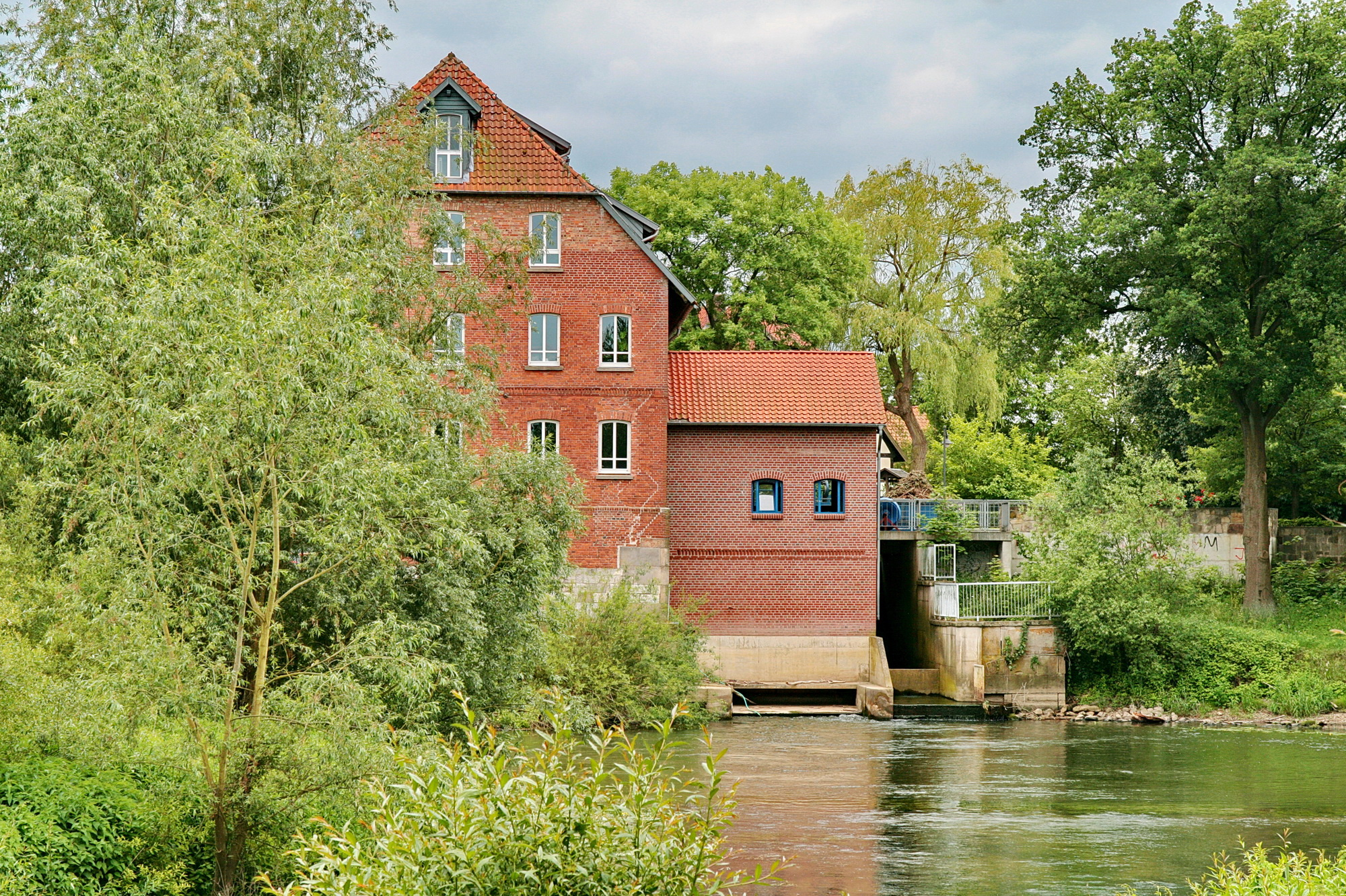
Old water mill

Meinersen is also the seat of the Samtgemeinde Meinersen ("collective municipality"), which consists of the following municipalities:

- Hillerse
- Leiferde
- Meinersen
- Müden (Aller)
