= Markus Vater =

German artist

Markus Vater (born 1970 in Düsseldorf) is a German artist. He studied at the Kunstakademie Düsseldorf and the Royal College of Art, London. He’s exhibited his works across Germany and internationally including at the Museum Franz Gertsch in Switzerland and the Royal Academy of Arts in London. He won the Villa Romana Prize in 2003 and was a founding member of the art collective hobbypopMUSEUM. He’s currently a professor at The Hochschule der bildenden Künste (HBK) Essen in Germany.

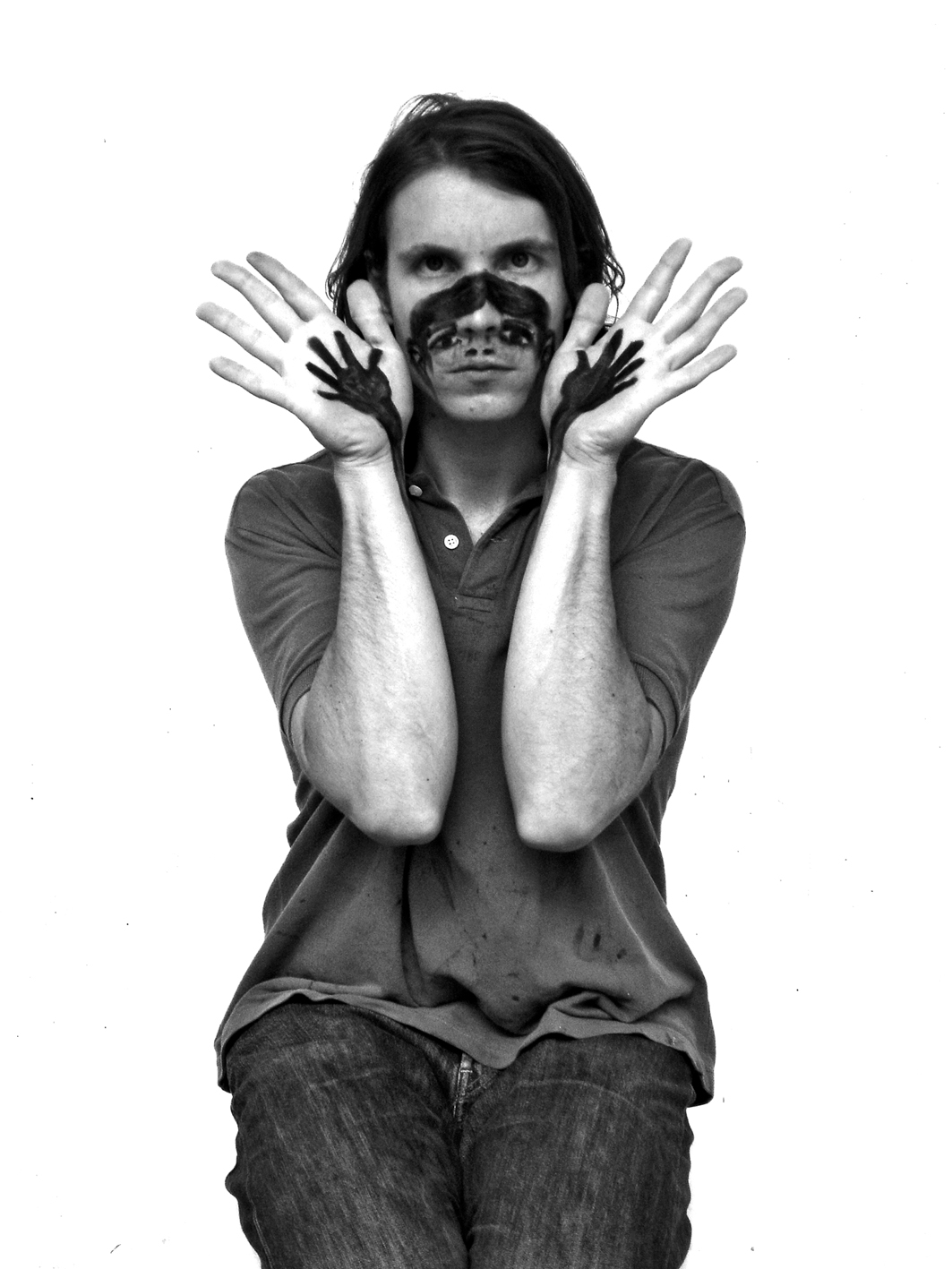
Markus Vater

== Exhibitions, installations (selection) ==
=== Solo exhibitions (selection) ===
- 2024, "Objects of Significance", Galerie Rupert Pfab, Düsseldorf
- 2022, "Mary sees the sun", Sprengel Museum, Hanover
- 2017, "Sitting in a hole that has the shape of a frightened cat", Union Gallery, London
- 2015, "I imagine how You imagine I imagine You", Galerie Rupert Pfab, Düsseldorf
- 2010, “Das Metapherproblem", Museum Kunstpalast, Düsseldorf
- 2007, “Projekt Passanten”, Fundament Foundation, Tilburg
- 2006, “Markus Vater", Sies + Höke Galerie, Düsseldorf
- 2002, "Markus Vater", Vilma Gold Gallery, London
- 1996, "Wir tarnen uns für die Sintflut", Galerie 102, Düsseldorf

=== Group exhibitions (selection) ===
- 2026, “Reich an Zeichen”, GalerieETAGE im Museum Reinickendorf , Berlin
- 2025, “Roling,Action……..Paint” ,Vestflossen Kunstlaboratorium, Vestfossen
- 2024, “Sprache/Text/Bild” , Draiflessen Collection, Mettingen
- 2023, “20 Years Union Gallery”, Union Gallery, London
- 2022, “Summershow”, Royal Academy of Arts, London
- 2021, “Videocitta - Video Art Program 3rd Edition", Videocittà, Palazzo dei Congressi, Rome
- 2020, “UNSTILLED LIFE: Artist Animations 1980-2020”, Ron Mandos Gallery, Amsterdam
- 2019, “Zwischen Nähe und Distanz: Konstruktion von Wirklichkeiten. Von Goya bis Picasso”, Museum Kunstpalast, Düsseldorf
- 2018, “Bild und Blick – Sehen in der Moderne", Wilhelm-Hack-Museum, Ludwigshafen am Rein
- 2014, "Hands", Museion, Bolzano
- 2010, "Linea, Line, Linie", Kunstmuseum Bonn, Bonn
- 2010, "Shudder", Drawingroom, London
- 2007, “Black Mountain”, Museum Baden, Solingen
- 2007, “frisch gestrichen”, Museum Franz Gertsch, Burgdorf
- 2006, “Metropolis Rise: New Art from London”, temporarycontemporary, 798 Art District, Beijing
- 2005, "Direct painting", Kunsthalle Mannhein, Mannheim
- 2004, "Year Zero", Northern Gallery for Contemporary Art, Sutherland
- 2001, “Death to the fascist insect...", Anthony D'Offay Gallery, London
- 2000, "Paintings", Timothy Taylor Gallery, London
- 1999, “Live Marslandung", hobbypopMUSEUM, Düsseldorf
