= Muden, KwaZulu-Natal =

Muden
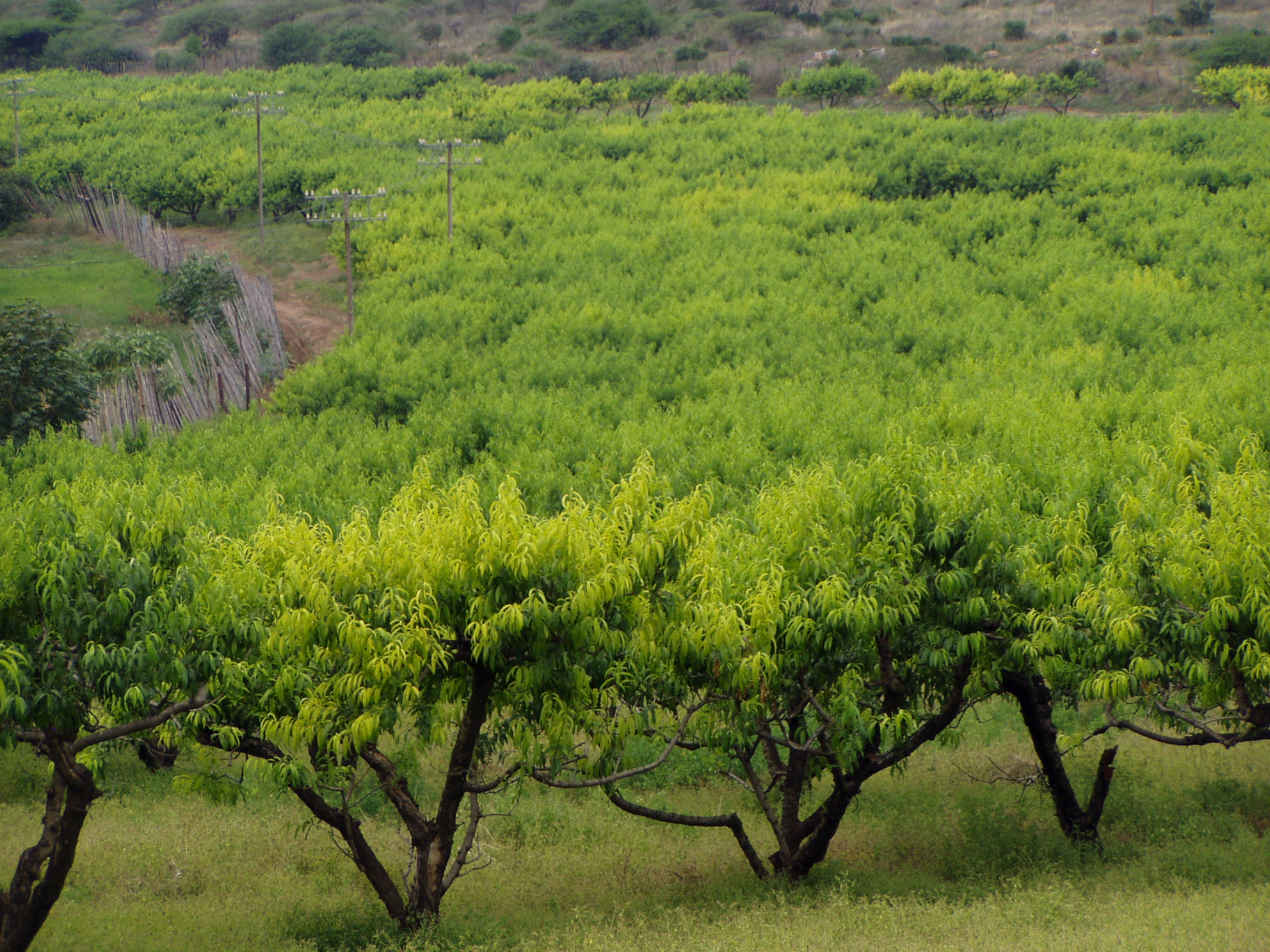
- A peach orchard in Muden

- Location within KwaZulu-Natal Location within South Africa
- Coordinates: 28.966°S 30.383°E
- Country: South Africa
- Province: KwaZulu-Natal
- District: uMzinyathi
- Municipality: uMvoti

Area
  - Total: 52.00 km^{2} (20.08 sq mi)

Population (2011)
  - Total: 5,308
  - Density: 102.1/km^{2} (264.4/sq mi)

Racial makeup (2011)
  - Black African: 98.6%
  - Coloured: 0.4%
  - Indian/Asian: 0.1%
  - White: 0.9%

First languages (2011)
  - Zulu: 96.2%
  - English: 1.3%
  - Other: 2.5%
- Time zone: UTC+2 (SAST)
- PO box: 3251
- Area code: 033

Muden is a hamlet on the Mooi River, 24 km northwest of Greytown and 38 km south-east of Weenen. It was established by the missionary Heinrich Röttcher and named for Müden, a municipality in Hanover, Germany, where he was from originally.

== Agriculture ==
An irrigation scheme in the area waters large citrus orchards. Muden also is the furthest east location where San rock art can be found.

== Sources ==
- Erasmus, B.P.J. (1995). Op Pad in Suid-Afrika. Jonathan Ball Uitgewers. ISBN 1-86842-026-4.
- Rosenthal, Eric (1967). Ensiklopedie van Suidelike Afrika.
