= Wolfsburg Hauptbahnhof =

Railway station in Wolfsburg, Germany

Wolfsburg Hbf
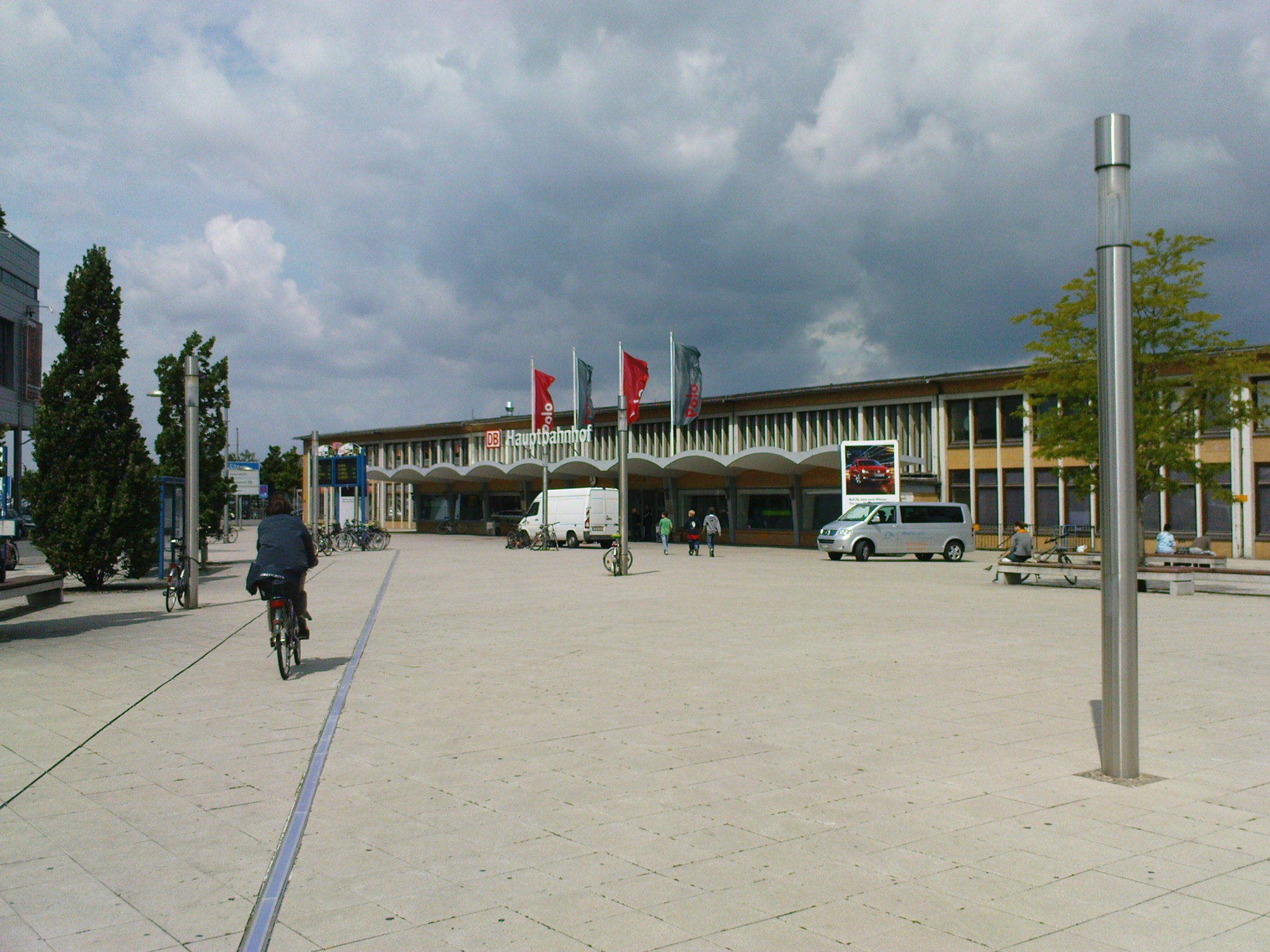
- Wolfsburg Hauptbahnhof

General information
- Location: Willy-Brandt-Platz 3, Wolfsburg, Lower Saxony; Germany
- Coordinates: 52°25′45″N 10°47′16″E
- Owner: Deutsche Bahn
- Operator: DB Station&Service
- Lines: Hanover–Berlin high-speed railway (KBS 301); Berlin–Lehrte railway (KBS 300)
- Platforms: 6

Construction
- Accessible: Yes

Other information
- Station code: 6859
- DS100 code: HWOB
- IBNR: 8006552
- Category: 2
- Fare zone: VRB: 20; marego: 100 (VRB transitional tariff, rail only)
- Website: www.bahnhof.de

History
- Opened: 1929 (first station building); 26 August 1957 (current building)
- Rebuilt: 1956-1957
- Electrified: 1997
- Former names: Rothenfelde-Wolfsburg (1928-1945); Wolfsburg (1945-2007)

Passengers
- About 10,000 (December 2008)
Services
Preceding station	DB Fernverkehr	Following station
Hannover Hbf towards Köln Hbf	ICE 10	Stendal Hbf towards Berlin Ostbahnhof
Braunschweig Hbf One-way operation	ICE 10	Stendal Hbf towards Berlin Ostbahnhof
Braunschweig Hbf towards Brig, Chur or Interlaken Ost	ICE 12	Stendal Hbf towards Berlin Ostbahnhof
Hannover Hbf towards Zürich HB	ICE 12	Stendal Hbf towards Berlin Ostbahnhof
Braunschweig Hbf towards Frankfurt Airport, Frankfurt (Main) Hbf, Karlsruhe Hbf or Stuttgart Hbf	ICE 13	Stendal Hbf towards Berlin Ostbahnhof
Hannover Hbf towards Aachen Hbf	ICE 14	Berlin-Spandau One-way operation
Hannover Hbf towards Stuttgart Hbf	ICE 16	Berlin-Spandau One-way operation
Hannover Hbf One-way operation	ICE 19	Berlin-Spandau towards Berlin Ostbahnhof
Preceding station	Abellio Rail Mitteldeutschland	Following station
Terminus	RE 6	Oebisfelde towards Magdeburg Hbf
Terminus	RB 35	Oebisfelde towards Stendal Hbf
Terminus	RB 36	Oebisfelde towards Magdeburg Hbf
Preceding station	Metronom	Following station
Wolfsburg-Fallersleben towards Hannover Hbf	RE 30	Terminus
Wolfsburg-Fallersleben towards Hildesheim Hbf	RE 50	Terminus
Location

Wolfsburg Hauptbahnhof is the main station of the city of Wolfsburg in the German state of Lower Saxony. It is on the Hanover–Berlin railway and it is the last Intercity-Express stop running east before Stendal or Berlin-Spandau.

Fallersleben station is also located in the district of Wolfsburg-Fallersleben.

On 25 August 2007, the 50th anniversary of the inauguration of the station building, the station was officially renamed Wolfsburg Hauptbahnhof (main station). Years before signs in the city referred to it as the Hauptbahnhof.

== History ==
The first station in Wolfsburg opened on 4 October 1928 in Rothenfelde. One of the signs at the station read Rothenfelde-Wolfsburg. Previously, passengers to Wolfsburg had to use the stations at Fallersleben or Vorsfelde.

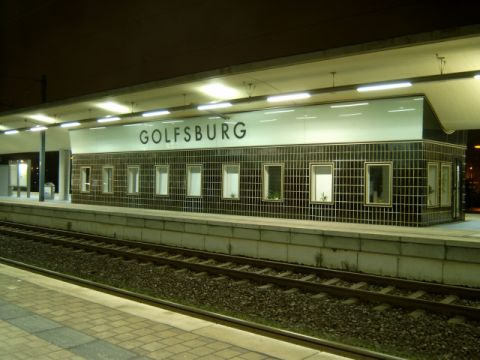
The Grade II listed building customs clearance on the platform, during the promotion of the town as Golfsburg for the launch of a new model of the Volkswagen Golf

The first station building in the town centre, approximately at its current location, was a wooden hut, like many buildings in Wolfsburg in the town's early days. Shortly after its establishment this fell into a dilapidated condition and served as a place for forced labourers from the Volkswagen factory to sleep at night. The hut was no bigger than a small warehouse and consisted essentially of a waiting room. In contrast to the present station building, this temporary building was north of the railway tracks, next to the Mittelland Canal near the Volkswagen factory. Today, the station building is located south of the tracks on Willy-Brandt-Platz.

=== After the WWII ===
The state of the station did not improve during the Second World War; the then city manager Dr. Dahme described it in 1947 in a letter to the Reichsbahndirektion (railway division) of Hanover as follows: "Our station is a miserable shack, which is acceptable for the needs of a Bavarian mountain village, but would under no circumstances be recognised as a railway station for a go-ahead city ..." The desolate, temporary war state, however, lasted until 1957.

The different views of the VW factory, Deutsche Bundesbahn and the city on the site of a new station delayed the start of construction considerably. The VW factory pressed for an early start of the construction project, because in the 1950s more than 5,780 people commuted to work in Wolfsburg every day. Finally, after agreement was reached on the station's location, its construction started on 6 March 1956. A little later, it was taken into provisional operations, but it was not fully functional until the beginning of the timetable for summer 1957. The new building was officially opened by the Federal Transport Minister Hans-Christoph Seebohm on 26 August 1957.

Later the Wolfsburg train station handled interzonal traffic between the West Germany and East Germany; Wolfsburg was the last stop before the Inner German border. The next stop was Oebisfelde in East Germany. The platform premises used for this traffic is still preserved.

== Current facilities ==
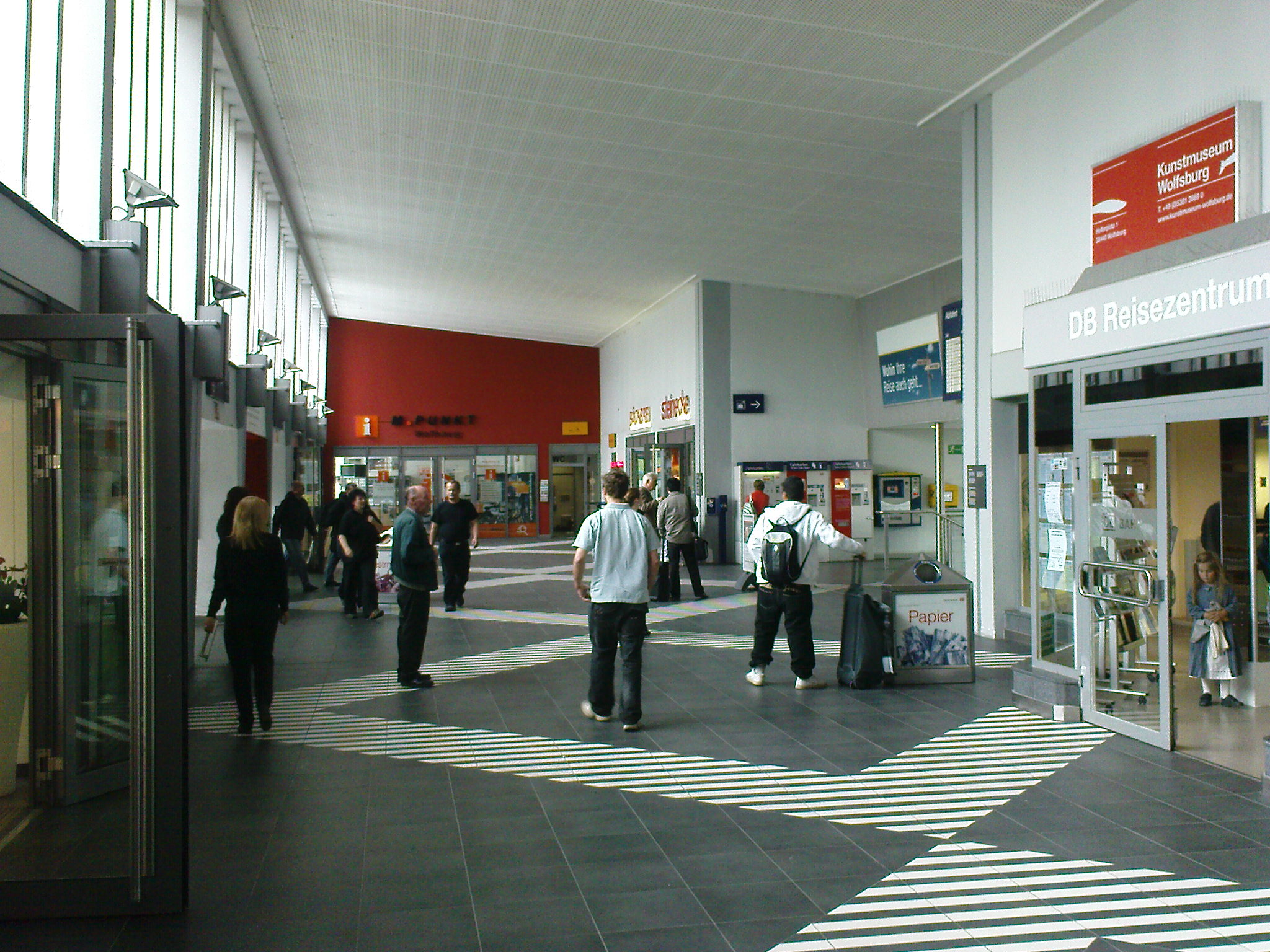
The interior of Wolfsburg Hauptbahnhof

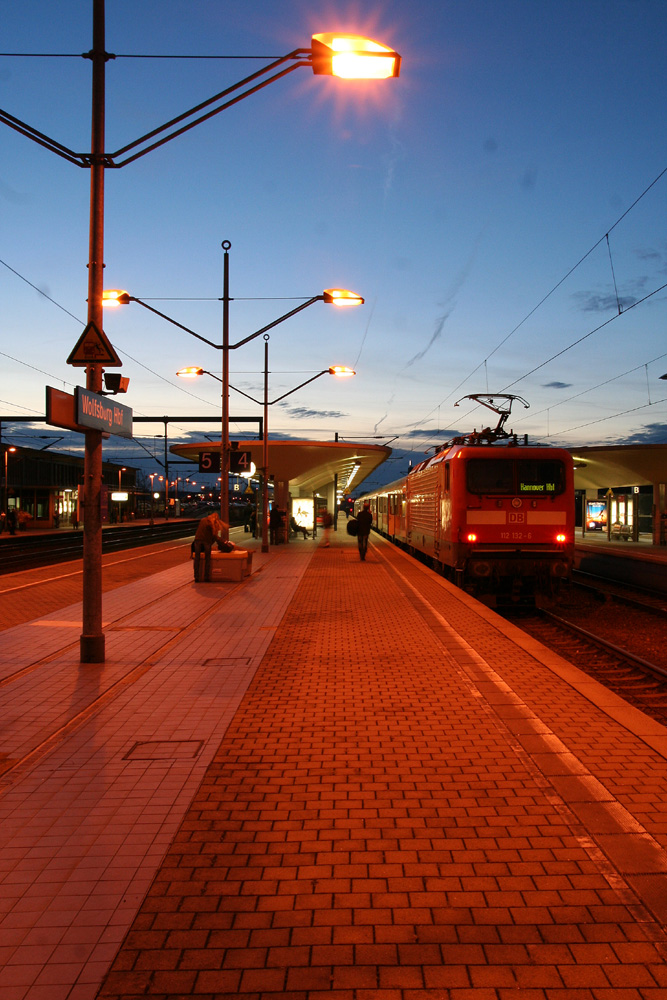
Wolfsburg Hauptbahnhof with RE to Hanover

Wolfsburg station is located on the line between Hanover and Berlin. Intercity-Express services run towards Hanover, Brunswick (Braunschweig) and Berlin (each are the next ICE stop). But only every second ICE on average stops in Wolfsburg. An Intercity service runs from Berlin via Wolfsburg to Amsterdam or to Munster. Wolfsburg station is connected by a Regional-Express service with Gifhorn and Hanover and by another line to Brunswick and Hildesheim. In addition, Regionalbahn services run to Oebisfelde and Stendal.

The first scheduled ICE stopped in Wolfsburg on 26 September 1998. The numbers of long-distance passengers has risen continuously since then. In 2004, 6,500 long-distance passengers were counted daily, in 2006 this has risen to about 7,800. In 2008, the number was 8,500 a day (another source says 10,000).

After the station building was neglected by the city council for a long time, extensive renovations began in 2004, which were estimated to cost €1.9 million. The station received a floor designed by the French artist Daniel Buren, business premises were rebuilt and various businesses including a travel centre and a service centre for Autostadt were installed. In the spring of 2011, the station tunnel was extended to the banks of the Mittelland Canal, giving a direct connection from the city to a new waterfront development.

The station building of Wolfsburg Hauptbahnhof with its typical architecture of the 1950s is now a heritage-listed building. In 2010, a sculpture by Quinto Provenziani honouring Italian immigrants was moved to the station.

== Train services ==
The station is served by the following services:

=== Long distance services ===
Line	Route			Frequency
ICE 10	Cologne –	Düsseldorf – Duisburg – Essen – Bochum – Dortmund –	Hamm – Bielefeld – Hanover – Wolfsburg – Berlin – Berlin Ostbahnhof	Hourly
ICE 10	Cologne –	Wuppertal – Hagen –	Hamm – Bielefeld – Hanover – Wolfsburg – Berlin – Berlin Ostbahnhof	Hourly
ICE 12	Switzerland – Basel – Freiburg – Karlsruhe – Mannheim – Frankfurt – Kassel – Braunschweig – Wolfsburg – Berlin – Berlin Ostbahnhof			Every 2 hours
ICE 13	Stuttgart –	Heidelberg – Darmstadt –	Frankfurt South – Kassel – Braunschweig – Wolfsburg – Berlin – Berlin Ostbahnhof	Every 2 hours
ICE 13	Karlsruhe –	Heidelberg – Darmstadt –	Frankfurt South – Kassel – Braunschweig – Wolfsburg – Berlin – Berlin Ostbahnhof	Every 2 hours
ICE 13	Frankfurt Airport –		Frankfurt South – Kassel – Braunschweig – Wolfsburg – Berlin – Berlin Ostbahnhof	Every 2 hours
ICE 14	Aachen ← Mönchengladbach ← Essen ← Bochum ← Dortmund ← Hamm ← Bielefeld ← Hanover ← Wolfsburg ← Berlin ← Berlin Ostbahnhof			One train

=== Regional services ===
- RE 30 Hannover - Lehrte - Gifhorn - Wolfsburg
- RE 50 Hildesheim - Braunschweig - Wolfsburg
- RB 35 Wolfsburg - Stendal
- RB 36 Wolfsburg - Magdeburg

Outside the station there is an extension for the Wolfsburg central bus station. This is the terminus of inner-city bus routes to Gifhorn, Brome, Helmstedt, Königslutter and Braunschweig (Regiobus).

== See also ==
- Rail transport in Germany
- Railway stations in Germany
