= Leiferde =

- Municipality
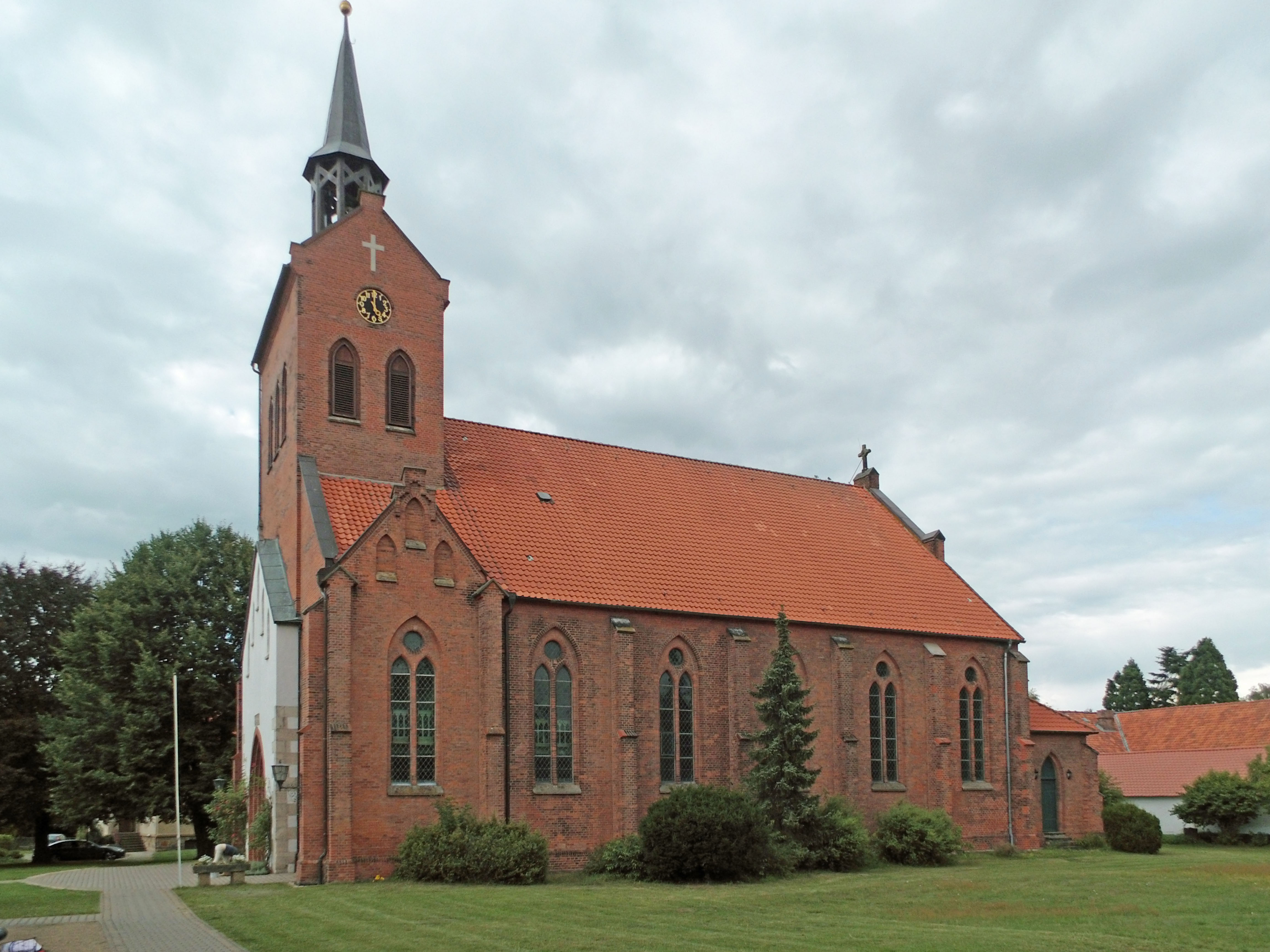
- Lutheran church

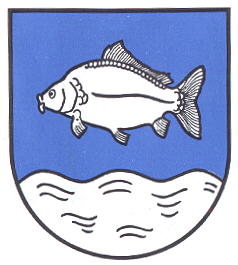
- Coat of arms

- Location of Leiferde within Gifhorn district
- Interactive map of Leiferde
- Location within Germany Location within Lower Saxony
- Coordinates: 52°26′20″N 10°26′19″E
- Country: Germany
- State: Lower Saxony
- District: Gifhorn
- Municipal assoc.: Meinersen
- Subdivisions: 2 Ortsteile

Government
  - Mayor: Stephanie Fahlbusch-Graber (CDU)

Area
  - Total: 27.88 km^{2} (10.76 sq mi)
- Elevation: 62 m (203 ft)

Population (2025-12-31)
  - Total: 4,216
  - Density: 151.2/km^{2} (391.7/sq mi)
- Time zone: UTC+01:00 (CET)
  - Summer (DST): UTC+02:00 (CEST)
- Postal codes: 38542
- Dialling codes: 05373
- Vehicle registration: GF
- Website: www.leiferde.de

Leiferde is a municipality in the district of Gifhorn, in Lower Saxony, Germany. The Municipality Leiferde includes the villages of Dalldorf and Leiferde.

It was the location of the 2022 cargo train incident on the Hanover–Berlin high-speed railway.
