= Müden (Aller) =

- Municipality
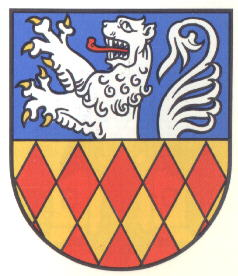
- Coat of arms

- Location of Müden within Gifhorn district
- Interactive map of Müden
- Location within Germany Location within Lower Saxony
- Coordinates: 52°32′N 10°22′E
- Country: Germany
- State: Lower Saxony
- District: Gifhorn
- Municipal assoc.: Meinersen
- Subdivisions: 6 Ortsteile

Government
  - Mayor: Horst Schiesgeries (CDU)

Area
  - Total: 67.27 km^{2} (25.97 sq mi)
- Elevation: 47 m (154 ft)

Population (2025-12-31)
  - Total: 5,165
  - Density: 76.78/km^{2} (198.9/sq mi)
- Time zone: UTC+01:00 (CET)
  - Summer (DST): UTC+02:00 (CEST)
- Postal codes: 38539
- Dialling codes: 05375
- Vehicle registration: GF
- Website: www.mueden-aller.de

Müden (German pronunciation: [ˈmyːdn̩]) is a municipality in the district of Gifhorn, in Lower Saxony, Germany. It is situated at the confluence of the rivers Aller and Oker. The Municipality Müden includes the villages of Bokelberge, Brenneckenbrück, Dieckhorst, Ettenbüttel, Flettmar, Gerstenbüttel, Gilde, Hahnenhorn and Müden. As of the most recent census data at 2022, the municipality has a population of approximately 5,264 residents

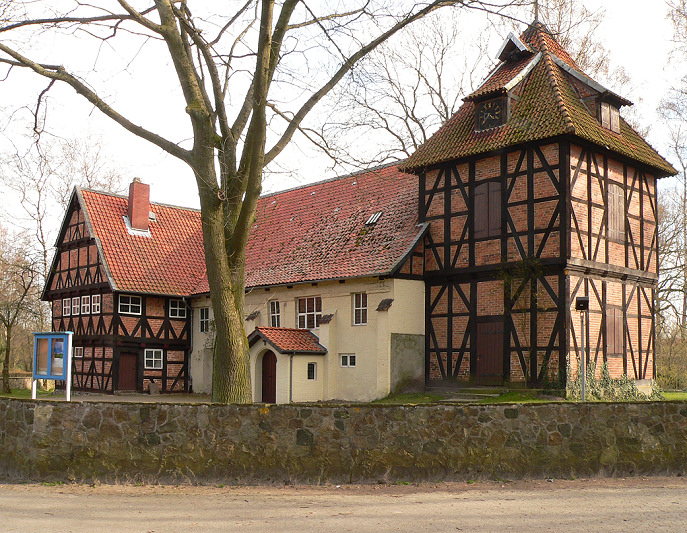
The lutheran church in Müden
