= Lübeck-Flughafen station =

Railway station in Germany

Lübeck Flughafen
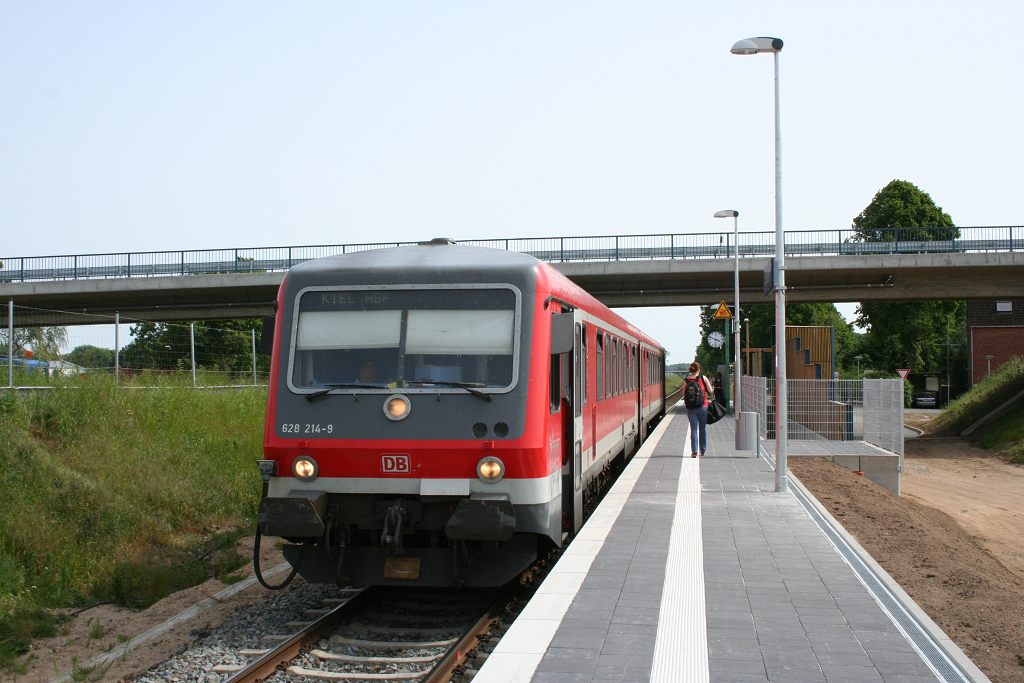
- Lübeck Flughafen station a few days after its opening

General information
- Location: Lübeck, Schleswig-Holstein; Germany
- Coordinates: 53°48′15″N 10°41′52″E
- Owner: Deutsche Bahn
- Operator: DB Station&Service
- Lines: Lübeck–Lüneburg railway (KBS 145)
- Platforms: 1
- Tracks: 1 side platform

Other information
- Station code: 3808
- DS100 code: ALB
- Category: 7

History
- Opened: May 2008

Services
Preceding station		Following station
Lübeck Hochschulstadtteil towards Kiel Hbf	RE 83	Ratzeburg towards Lüneburg
Location
- Location within Schleswig-Holstein Location within Germany Location within Europe

Lübeck Flughafen (Airport) station is an airport station on the Lübeck–Lüneburg railway in Lübeck in the German state of Schleswig-Holstein. It has been in service for passengers since May 2008. Lübeck-Blankensee station had been located in the same place, but it closed a long time ago.

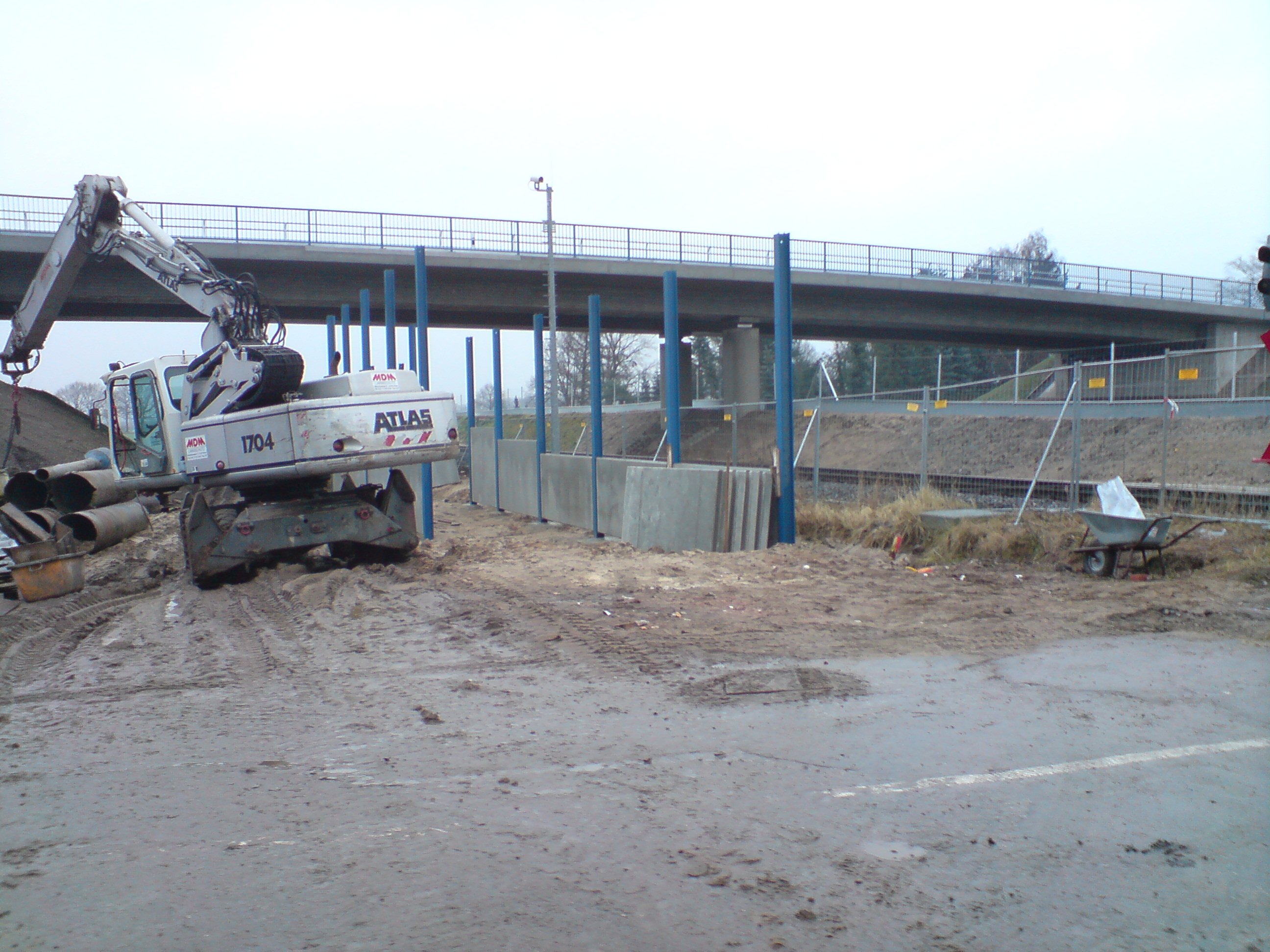
Lübeck-Flughafen station under construction

The Lübeck–Lüneburg railway runs close to the reopened Lübeck Airport. The opening of the station has improved the accessibility of the airport; the trip from Lübeck Hauptbahnhof has decreased from some 30 minutes by bus to less than ten minutes. In 2024, Ryanair announced it would return to Lübeck after a ten-year hiatus, inaugurating scheduled flights to London, Málaga and Palma de Mallorca in 2025.

The installation of a lift to the bridge running above the platform has significantly shortened the route to the airport. The lift took over two years to complete.

== Rail services ==
The station is located on the Kiel–Lüneburg route. It is served hourly daily (weekdays and Sundays) in each direction (April 2013) with two departures every hour. Scheduled services are operated with a class 648 (Alstom Coradia LINT) diesel multiple units. There is a direct connection from Kiel Hauptbahnhof without changing trains; from Hamburg, there are two connections per hour to this station, one with a change in Lübeck and the other with a change in Büchen.

The following service stops at the station:

Train class	Route	Timetable route
RE 83	Kiel Hbf – Preetz – Lübeck Hbf – Lübeck-Hochschulstadtteil – Lübeck Flughafen – Büchen – Lüneburg	145

== Planning ==
It has been suggested that Lübeck Flughafen station (or Ratzeburg) could be the starting point for a service of a Lübeck S-Bahn that would run every half hour from here to Hochschulstadtteil, the Hauptbahnhof, Dänischburg, Kücknitz and Travemünde.

== Notable places nearby ==
- Lübeck Airport
