= Mölln (Lauenb) station =

Railway station in Mölln, Germany

Mölln (Lauenb)
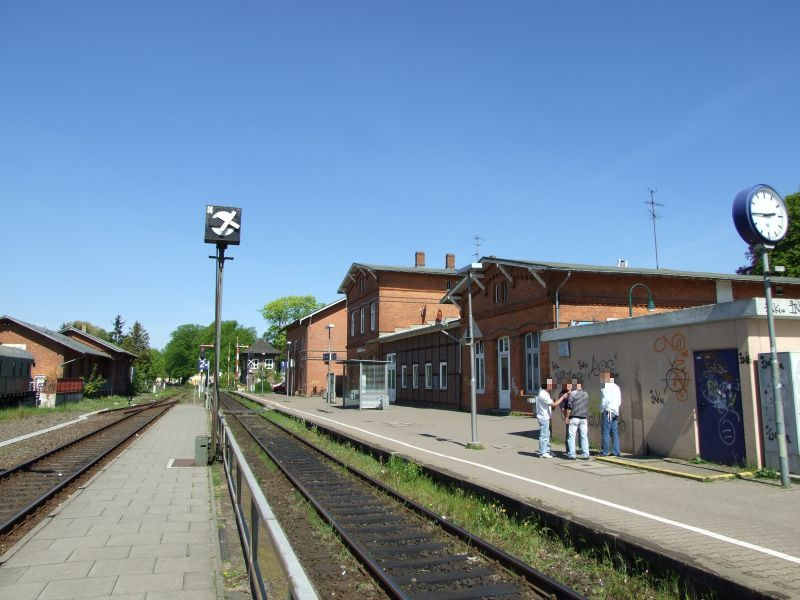

General information
- Location: Mölln, Schleswig-Holstein; Germany
- Coordinates: 53°37′27″N 10°40′59″E
- Lines: Lüneburg–Büchen (km 29.2) (KBS 145); Mölln–Hollenbek (km 11.7), (KBS 145)
- Platforms: 1

Construction
- Accessible: Yes
- Architectural style: Gründerzeit

Other information
- Station code: 4159
- DS100 code: AMLN
- IBNR: 8004057
- Category: 5
- Fare zone: HVV: E/816
- Website: www.bahnhof.de

History
- Opened: 16 October 1851

Services
Preceding station		Following station
Ratzeburg towards Kiel Hbf	RE 83	Büchen towards Lüneburg
Location

Mölln (Lauenburg) station is located in the Mölln in the district of Herzogtum Lauenburg in the German state of Schleswig-Holstein. The first station building was opened simultaneously with the Lübeck–Lüneburg railway on 16 October 1851, but was later demolished.

The present building was erected in 1899; at the same time the Mölln–Hollenbek railway was built to connect with the Hagenow Land–Bad Oldesloe railway (also known as the Kaiserbahn or "Imperial Railway"). The Mölln–Hollenbek line was closed in 1959. Today only the Lübeck-Lüneburg railway is still in operation.

== Infrastructure ==
The entrance building, which was built in 1851 with Prussian architectural features, is closed as a result of vandalism. The unused part of the entrance building formerly housed the Lok-Haus restaurant and a kiosk.

The station area was renovated in 2008. The old semaphore signals were replaced by colour light signals and the trackbed of track 2 was renewed, and the level crossing was completely rebuilt.

== Rail services ==
The station has two tracks, but only track 1 is used by passenger traffic since the crossing loop in Ratzeburg has been reactivated and trains now cross there. Freight traffic only occasionally uses the line.

Line	Route	Frequency
RE 83	Lüneburg – Büchen – Mölln (Lauenburg) – Ratzeburg – Lübeck Hbf – Eutin – Preetz – Kiel Hbf	Hourly

Three regional bus routes depart from the station forecourt and connect the station with central Mölln among other places.
