= Lüneburg station =

Railway station in Lüneburg, Germany

Lüneburg
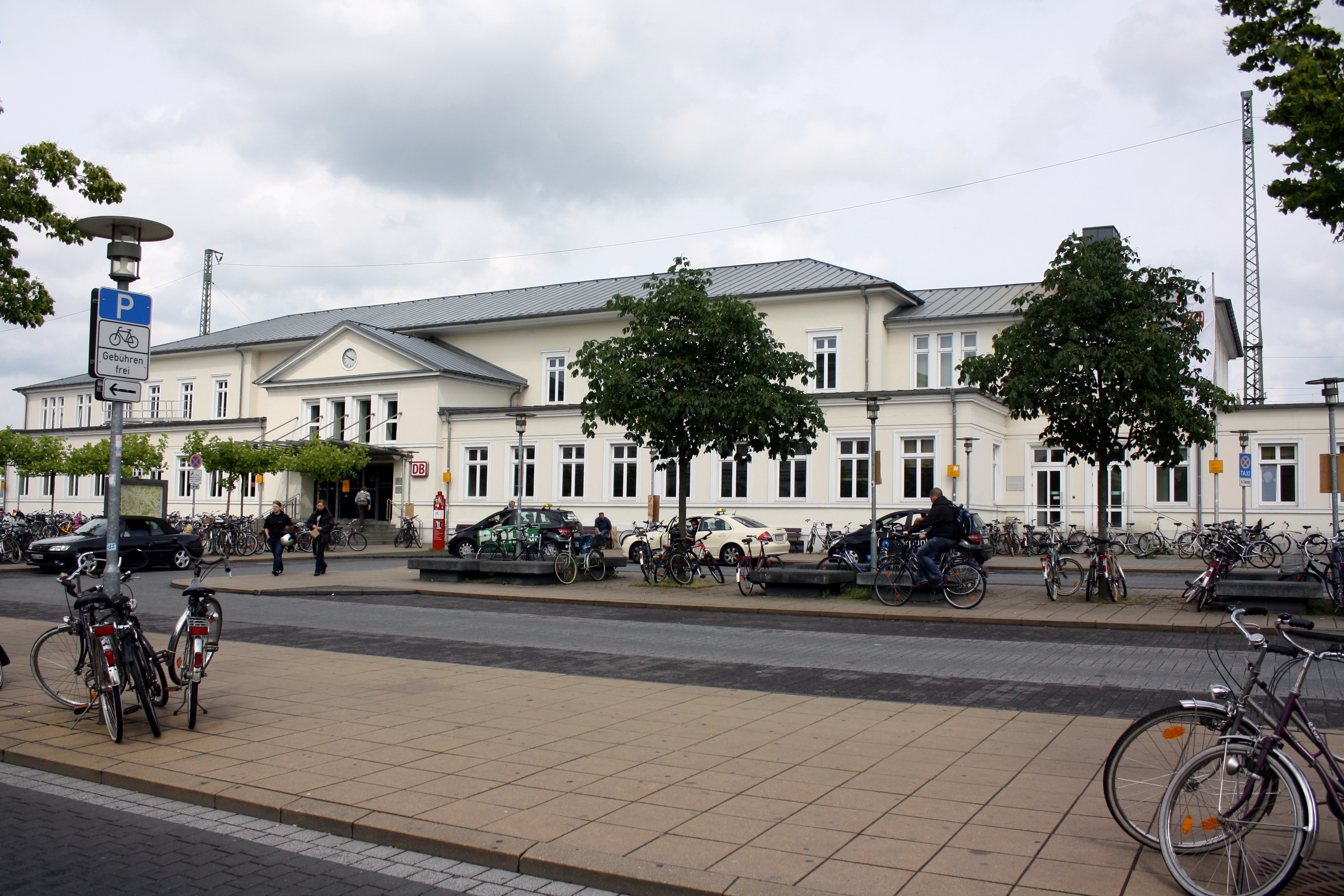

General information
- Location: Bahnhofstr. 10, Lüneburg, Lower Saxony; Germany
- Coordinates: 53°15′0″N 10°25′11″E
- Owner: Deutsche Bahn
- Operator: DB Station&Service
- Lines: Hannover–Hamburg (1720) (KBS 110); Lüneburg–Lübeck (1150) (KBS 145); Wittenberge–Buchholz (1151) (KBS 112); Lüneburg–Bleckede (9110) (Museum services); Lüneburg–Soltau (9111) (Museumsverkehr)
- Platforms: 2 (west) + 5 (east)

Construction
- Accessible: Yes

Other information
- Station code: 3855
- DS100 code: ALBG
- IBNR: 8000238
- Category: 2
- Fare zone: HVV: E/807
- Website: www.bahnhof.de

Services
Preceding station	DB Fernverkehr	Following station
Hamburg-Harburg One-way operation	ICE 11	Uelzen towards München Hbf
Hamburg-Harburg towards Hamburg Hbf	ICE 12	Uelzen One-way operation
Hamburg-Harburg towards Hamburg-Altona	ICE 24	Hannover Hbf towards München Hbf
Hamburg-Harburg towards Westerland (Sylt)	ICE 24	Hannover Hbf towards Frankfurt (Main) Hbf
Hamburg-Harburg towards Hamburg-Altona	ICE 25	Hannover Hbf towards München Hbf
Preceding station	Metronom	Following station
Winsen towards Hamburg Hbf	RE 3	Bienenbüttel towards Hannover Hbf
Bardowick towards Hamburg-Harburg	RB 31	Terminus
Preceding station		Following station
Echem towards Kiel Hbf	RE 83	Terminus
Terminus	RB 32	Wendisch Evern towards Dannenberg Ost
Location

Lüneburg station consists of the two formerly independent stations of the town of Lüneburg. Lüneburg Ost (east) is the current station and Lüneburg West now only forms part of the station precinct. Both entrance buildings are located on islands between the platforms.

== Train services ==
The eastern station is on the main line from Hanover to Hamburg and is served by trains of both Deutsche Bahn and Metronom Eisenbahngesellschaft. In addition to regional trains, Intercity and Intercity-Express trains also stop in Lüneburg.

The route to Lübeck via Lauenburg (Elbe) and Büchen and the route to Bleckede also operate from the eastern station.

The western station served the formerly continuous line from Wittenberg to Buchholz, which is now a single-track branch line to Dannenberg Ost, also called the Wendlandbahn (Wendland Railway), and is used for the transport of nuclear waste to Gorleben. There is also a connection from the western station to the line to Soltau Süd.

Osthannoversche Eisenbahnen (OHE) operate freight and excursion traffic over separated routes to Bleckede and Soltau that are connected by Deutsche Bahn track. While passenger trains from Bleckede ended in the eastern station instead of OHE’s Lüneburg Nord station as early as 1960, the terminus for passenger trains from Soltau was traditionally at Lüneburg Süd (south) station, one kilometre away. Later a contract was signed between DBAG and OHE for the operation of trains to the western station. The operation of scheduled passenger services by OHE to Bleckede was abandoned on 21 May 1977.

In the 2026 timetable, the following services stop at the station:

Line	Route	Interval (min)	Operator
ICE 11	Munich – Stuttgart – Frankfurt – Göttingen – Hanover – Lüneburg – Hamburg	Some trains at night	DB Fernverkehr
ICE 24	Hamburg-Altona – Hamburg – Lüneburg – Hanover – Kassel – Würzburg – Augsburg – Munich	Some trains	DB Fernverkehr
ICE 24	Westerland – Hamburg – Lüneburg – Hanover – Kassel – Frankfurt	1 train pair	DB Fernverkehr
ICE 25	Hamburg-Altona – Hamburg – Hamburg-Harburg – Lüneburg – Hanover – Göttingen – Kassel – Fulda – Würzburg – Nuremberg – Munich	60	DB Fernverkehr
RE 3	(Hannover – Celle –)Uelzen – Lüneburg – Hamburg	60 (120)	metronom
RE 83	Lüneburg – Büchen – Lübeck Flughafen – Lübeck (– Kiel)	60	Erixx
RB 31	Lüneburg – Winsen (Luhe) – Maschen – Hamburg-Harburg – Hamburg	60	metronom
RB 32	Lüneburg – Dahlenburg – Dannenberg Ost	180	Erixx

== Station infrastructure ==
The station consists of two stations, each with their own entrance buildings, which lie opposite each other separated by Bahnhofstrasse (station street).

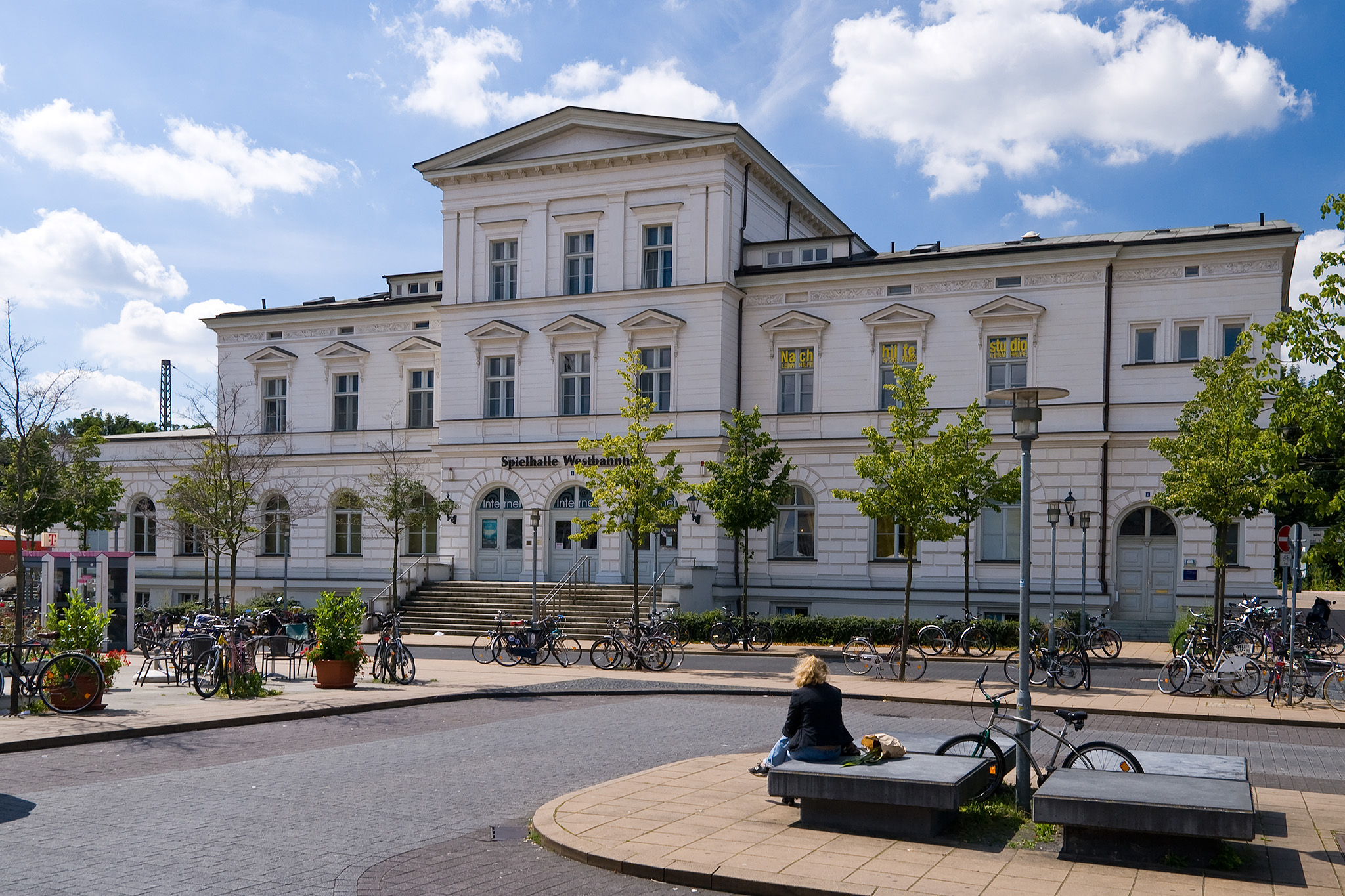
The western station is now used as a casino

The Lüneburg West section of the station is on Wittenberge–Buchholz railway. The station building is built in an elaborate neoclassical style and is now used as a casino. In addition to the disused platform next to the station building, there is another platform that is used by the Regionalbahn services to and from Hamburg and Dannenberg.

The Lüneburg East section of the station has a somewhat simpler entrance building, which is still used as the station building. In addition to the main platform next to the station building, there are still three platforms, each with edges to tracks on both sides, but the easternmost is no longer used.

South of the passenger station is the freight yard. The Lüneburg workshop (Bahnbetriebswerk Lüneburg) was east of it on the opposite side of the tracks until 1960. Since the reconstruction of the station area between 1994 and 2002, the workshop area has been used for the parking of rolling stock.

Lüneburg South station was a few metres to the south, but has been almost completely dismantled.

== Facilities ==
The station has a park and ride car park, two bicycle parking garages and a passenger drop-off point. The station also has a bus station and a taxi rank.

== Art at the station ==
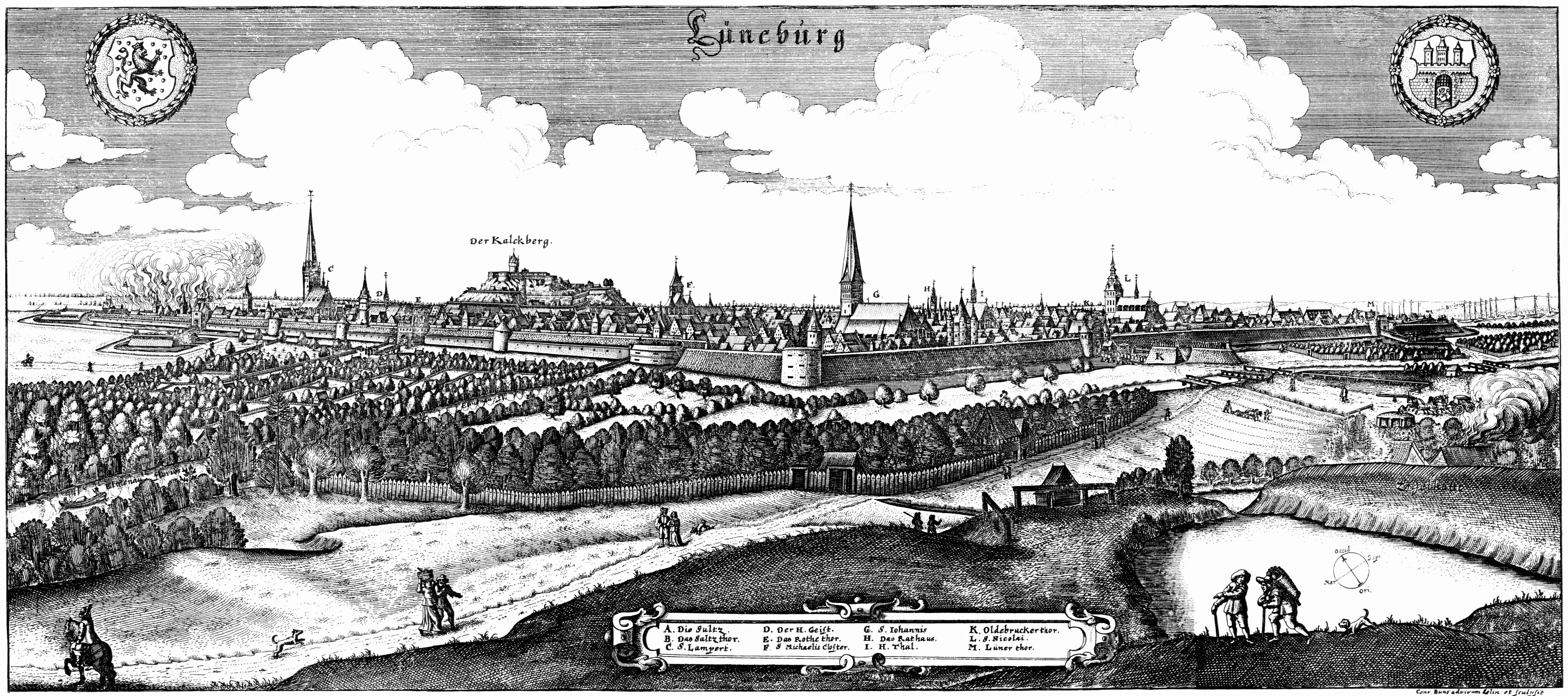
Matthäus Merian cityscape of Lüneburg, which served as the basis for the mural

The Bardowick painter Hugo Friedrich Hartmann (1870–1960) painted two large murals in the waiting room of the eastern station in 1939. One image shows a heathland scene, the other a Luneburg cityscape based on a copper engraving of the Topographia Germaniae by Matthäus Merian the Elder.

== Fares ==
The city and district of Lüneburg have been part of the Hamburger Verkehrsverbund (Hamburg Transport Association) since December 2004. Lüneburg is easily accessible with its proximity to Hamburg and its convenient location. The traveling time to Hamburg Hauptbahnhof is about 30 minutes.

== See also ==
- Rail transport in Germany
- Railway stations in Germany
