= Buchholz (Nordheide) railway station =

Railway station in Buchholz in der Nordheide, Germany

Buchholz (Nordheide)
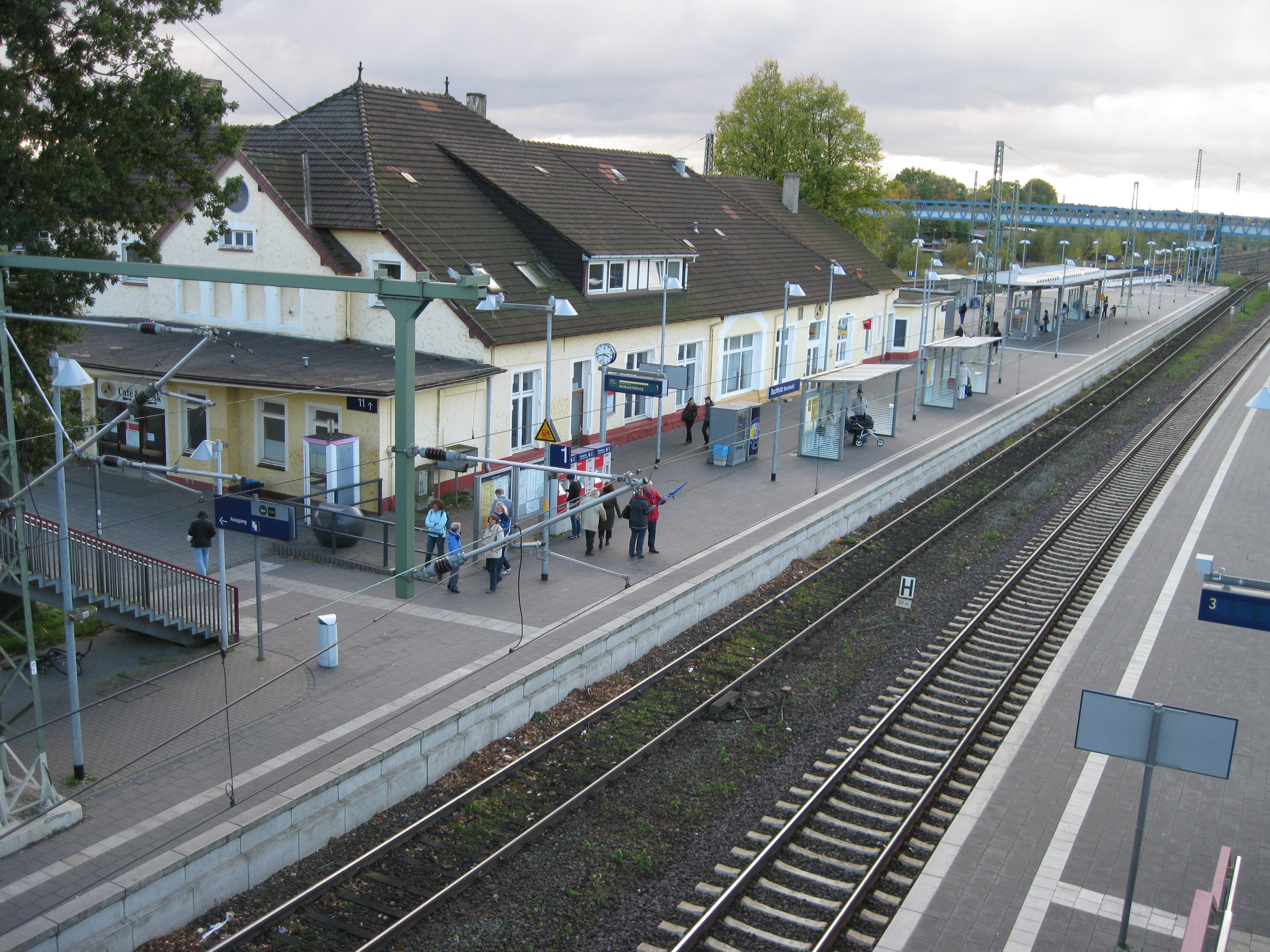
- Buchholz railway station

General information
- Location: Buchholz in der Nordheide, Lower Saxony; Germany
- Coordinates: 53.3245°N 9.8763°E
- Owner: DB Netz
- Operator: DB Station&Service
- Lines: Wanne-Eickel–Hamburg railway Heath Railway Wittenberge–Buchholz railway
- Platforms: 4
- Train operators: Regionalverkehre Start Deutschland; Metronom

Construction
- Accessible: Yes

Other information
- Station code: 941
- Category: 4
- Fare zone: HVV: D/708
- Website: www.bahnhof.de

Services
Preceding station	Metronom	Following station
Tostedt towards Bremen Hbf	RE 4	Hamburg-Harburg towards Hamburg Hbf
Sprötze towards Bremen Hbf	RB 41	Klecken towards Hamburg Hbf
Preceding station	Start	Following station
Terminus	RB 38	Suerhop towards Hannover Hbf
Location
- Location within Lower Saxony

Buchholz (Nordheide) (German: Bahnhof Buchholz (Nordheide)) is a railway station located in Buchholz in der Nordheide, Germany. The station is located on the Wanne-Eickel–Hamburg railway, Heath Railway and Wittenberge–Buchholz railway. The train services are operated by Metronom and Regionalverkehre Start Deutschland.

== Train services ==
The station was served by the following services in 2026:

- Regional services RE 4 Bremen - Rotenburg - Tostedt - Buchholz - Hamburg
- Local services RB 38 Buchholz - Soltau - Hanover
- Local services RB 41 Bremen - Rotenburg - Tostedt - Buchholz - Hamburg
