= Buechen =

Buechen may refer to:

- Buechen, Schleswig-Holstein, a municipality in the German state of Schleswig-Holstein
- Buechen, St. Gallen, a village in the Swiss canton of St. Gallen
