= Büchen station =

Railway station in Germany

Büchen
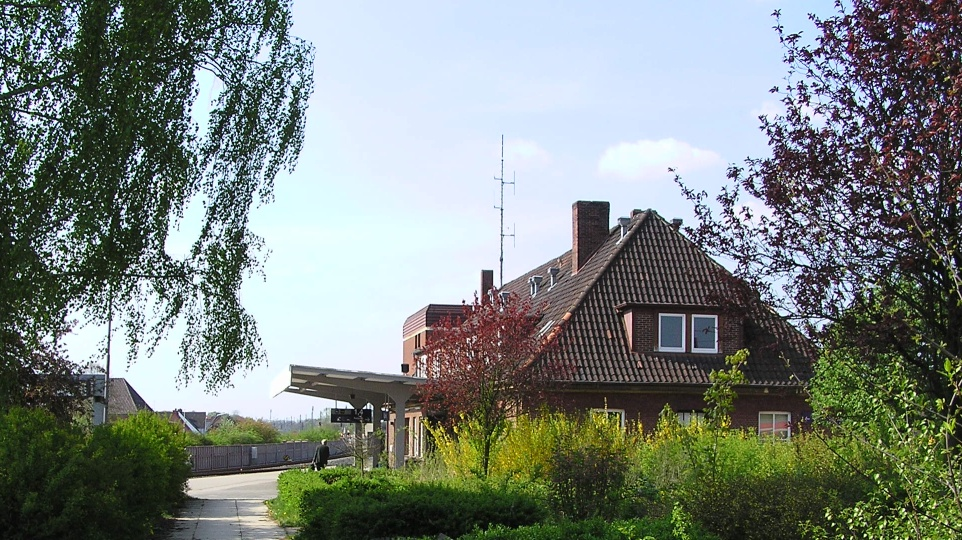
- The entrance building in 2004 with track 140 on the "house" platform

General information
- Location: Lauenburger Str., Büchen, Schleswig-Holstein; Germany
- Coordinates: 53°28′31″N 10°37′22″E
- Owner: Deutsche Bahn
- Operator: DB Station&Service
- Lines: Berlin–Hamburg (238.9 km) (KBS 100); Lüneburg–Büchen (161.3 km) (KBS 145); Lübeck–Büchen (47.6 km), (KBS 145)
- Platforms: 5
- Train operators: DB Fernverkehr; DB Regio Nord; Erixx

Construction
- Accessible: Yes

Other information
- Station code: 929
- DS100 code: ALCH
- IBNR: 8000058
- Category: 3
- Fare zone: HVV: D/726
- Website: www.bahnhof.de

History
- Opened: 15 October 1851; 174 years ago
- Electrified: 29 September 1996; 29 years ago, 15 kV 16.7 Hz AC Overhead line

Passengers
- 4000

Services
Preceding station	DB Regio Nordost	Following station
Müssen towards Hamburg Hbf	RE 1	Schwanheide towards Rostock Hbf
Preceding station		Following station
Mölln (Lauenb) towards Kiel Hbf	RE 83	Lauenburg (Elbe) towards Lüneburg
Location

Büchen station is a railway junction in Büchen in the German state of Schleswig-Holstein. About 4,000 passengers embark or disembark each day (as of 2013).

In front of the station building there is a bus stop with connections to the surrounding villages. Büchen station is served by trains on the Berlin–Hamburg and Lübeck–Lüneburg lines.

During the division of Germany, Büchen was a border station on the line between Berlin and Hamburg in the Federal Republic of Germany.

== History ==
The station was opened on 15 October 1851 with the completion of the Lübeck–Büchen section of the Lübeck–Lüneburg line by the Lübeck-Büchen Railway (German: Lübeck-Büchener Eisenbahn, LBE). It is also located on the Berlin-Hamburg line, which had already been opened in 1846. Simultaneously with the opening of the Büchen line of the LBE, the Berlin-Hamburg Railway Company (Berlin-Hamburger Eisenbahn-Aktiengesellschaft), opened a branch line from Büchen to Lauenburg. Passenger services were soon running on the Lübeck–Lauenburg route and after the opening of the bridge over the Elbe in Lauenburg to Lüneburg.

In April 1945, the station was seriously damaged by bombing and, at the end of the month, German troops demolished the bridge over the Elbe–Lübeck Canal to the east of the station.

After the Second World War, the Berlin–Hamburg line was divided between Schwanheide station and Büchen by the Inner German border. On the eastern side of the border, one of the two tracks between Berlin and Schwanheide was dismantled for reparations. Later the second track was removed on the western side between Büchen and Schwarzenbek, the next station.

Traffic was initially completely interrupted in the vicinity of the border. In the summer of 1946, the bridge over the Elbe–Lübeck Canal was restored, but freight was not resumed until 27 August 1947. First, it was agreed that a pair of passenger trains could also run, but they were not introduced. For the time being three through freight trains ran each day in each direction and were handed over between Büchen and Schwanheide. In the autumn of the same year it was agreed to operate additional freight trains. During the Berlin Blockade in 1948, traffic decreased significantly, but did not come to a complete standstill. On 10 September 1949, passenger traffic was resumed with two pairs of trains, one operated by railcars of the Cologne class (Bauart Köln), which were derived from the Flying Hamburger.

In 1953, ten regular and three as-required freight trains ran towards the west and five regular and three as-required freight trains ran towards the east. Freight trains running in transit to and from West Berlin passed through Büchen from 1965. The border crossing was the most important in West Germany for the transport of freight, especially in transit between Comecon countries and the port of Hamburg. It saved foreign exchange as it was the shortest route to West Germany. Almost 433,000 wagons in 12,250 freight trains were moved in 1982. Crossing the border at Büchen station took about two hours for a freight train. The change of locomotive between Deutsche Bundesbahn and Deutsche Reichsbahn always occurred in Büchen until 1973 but DR locomotives could also haul passenger trains to and from Hamburg.

With the upgrading of the route as part of the German Unity Transport Projects (Verkehrsprojekte Deutsche Einheit), the Hagenow Land–Büchen section was electrified in 1996. Today, in addition to Regionalbahn and Regional-Express services, some EuroCity services operate on the Hamburg–Berlin–Dresden–Prague–Budapest route and the EuroCity Vindobona runs between Hamburg and Villach.

In October 2010, the renovation of the station started with the demolition of the old station building. Extensive work, costing €4.5 million, was officially completed in November 2013.

== Infrastructure ==
The Berlin–Hamburg railway passes through the town along a straight route from the southeast to the northwest. Before the conversion of the line into a high-speed line the platforms were arranged next to each other. The high-speed line now fans out in the station area into four parallel tracks with the two inner tracks, which are upgraded for speeds up to 230 km/h and are for non-stop high-speed passenger traffic. The outer tracks each have outside platforms and are numbered 1 (towards Berlin) and 4 (Hamburg). These serve long-distance and regional services on the Hamburg–Rostock and Hamburg–Berlin routes and also as the terminus of regional services from Aumühle, without hindering the passage of Intercity-Express trains. These two platform tracks continue about 1.5 km from the station towards Hamburg and then connect with the double-track main line. These tracks all have electric overhead line.

The one track of the non-electrified Lübeck–Lüneburg line runs from the north to the southeast briefly connecting with the Berlin–Hamburg line and branching through several systems of points and branching off again after about 400 metres to the south towards Lauenburg and Lüneburg. After this junction, this line runs as two tracks in the station area with an intervening island platform. These two tracks are numbered on the island platform as tracks 40 and 41, while an additional platform next to the station building to the north of these two tracks is numbered as 140.

Tracks branch off the Lübeck–Lüneburg line to the north of the Berlin-Hamburg route alongside the platform tracks including tracks for handling freight, which have now been largely dismantled. Several sidings also branch off from the Lübeck–Lüneburg line to the south of the Berlin–Hamburg line.

=== Access ===
The station precincts include local municipal buildings across the tracks from the station building and some undeveloped land. A pedestrian tunnel has been built below the north-western end of the rail precinct running under both railways to give access to the platforms with entrances at both ends. Stairs gives access from this tunnel to platforms 1 and 4 on the Berlin-Hamburg line, as well as the western part of town. The tunnel entrances and platform stairs do not have escalators or lifts. New construction due to be carried out in 2011 and 2012 would provide lifts from the pedestrian tunnel to platform 4 and to platforms 1 and 140, which is connected to the island platform served by tracks 40 and 41.

Platform 140 is accessible from platform 1 via a paved footpath over the partly unpaved area between the angle of the railway tracks. The island platform fronting tracks 40 and 41 can be reached from the end of platform 140 by a level crossing over track 40.

=== Buildings and service facilities ===
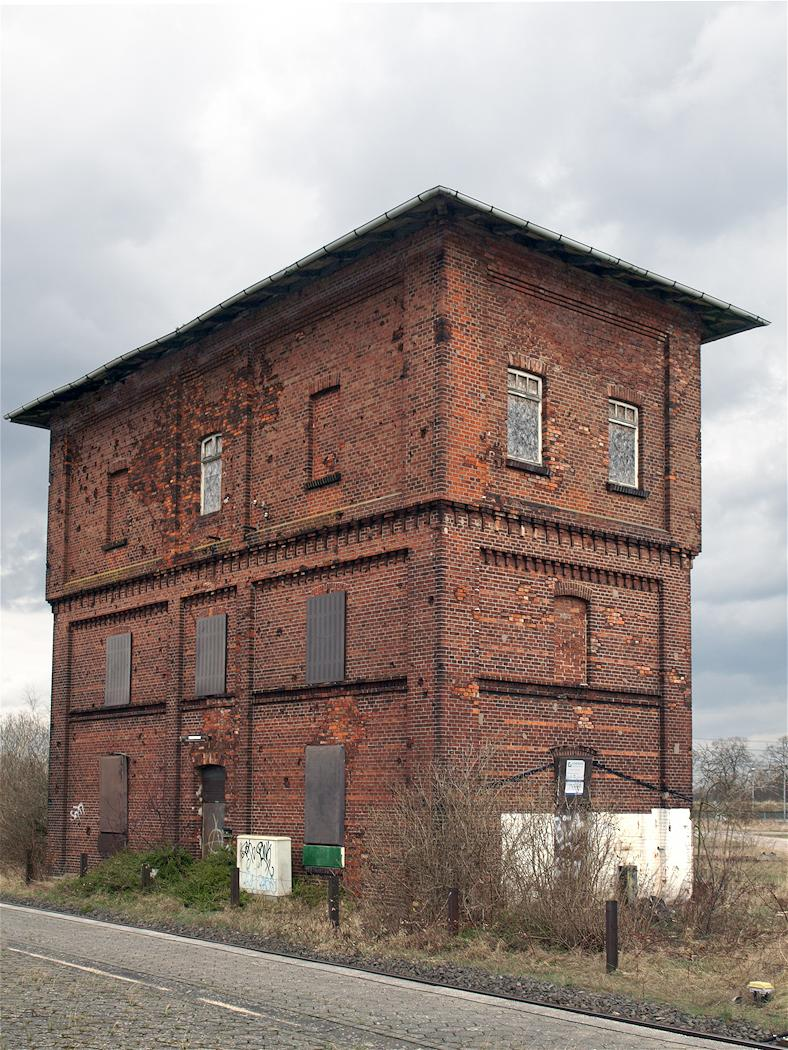
Former Büchen water tower

The original station building was destroyed in 1945. In the 1950s, a large entrance building was built with border crossing facilities. This was demolished in 2011. A new station building was built.

There was a water tower between the island platform and the sidings, which was a two-story building and had two water tanks to supply steam locomotives and also served as a drinking water reservoir for the station building. It was built in 1912 and demolished in 2013.

Since the renovation, the station has had an entrance building built of containers with a Deutsche Bahn travel centre and a branch of a local baking chain.

== Rail services ==
In the 2026 timetable, the following services stop at the station:

Line	Route	Interval
RE 1	Hamburg Hbf – Büchen – Hagenow Land – Schwerin Hbf – Bad Kleinen – Blankenberg (Meckl) – Bützow – Rostock Hbf	Every 2 hours; hourly in the peak on the Hamburg Hbf – Büchen (– Schwerin Hbf) section
RE 83	Lübeck Hbf – Mölln (Lauenburg) – Büchen – Lauenburg (Elbe) – Lüneburg	Hourly
