= Erixx =

German rail transport company

Erixx GmbH
- Type: GmbH
- Founded: 2011
- Headquarters: Celle, Germany
- Number of locations: 67 stations
- Area served: HVV, GVH, VBN
- Key people: Wolfgang Kloppenburg
- Services: Passenger transportation
- Parent: Osthannoversche Eisenbahnen AG (OHE)
- Website: www.erixx.de

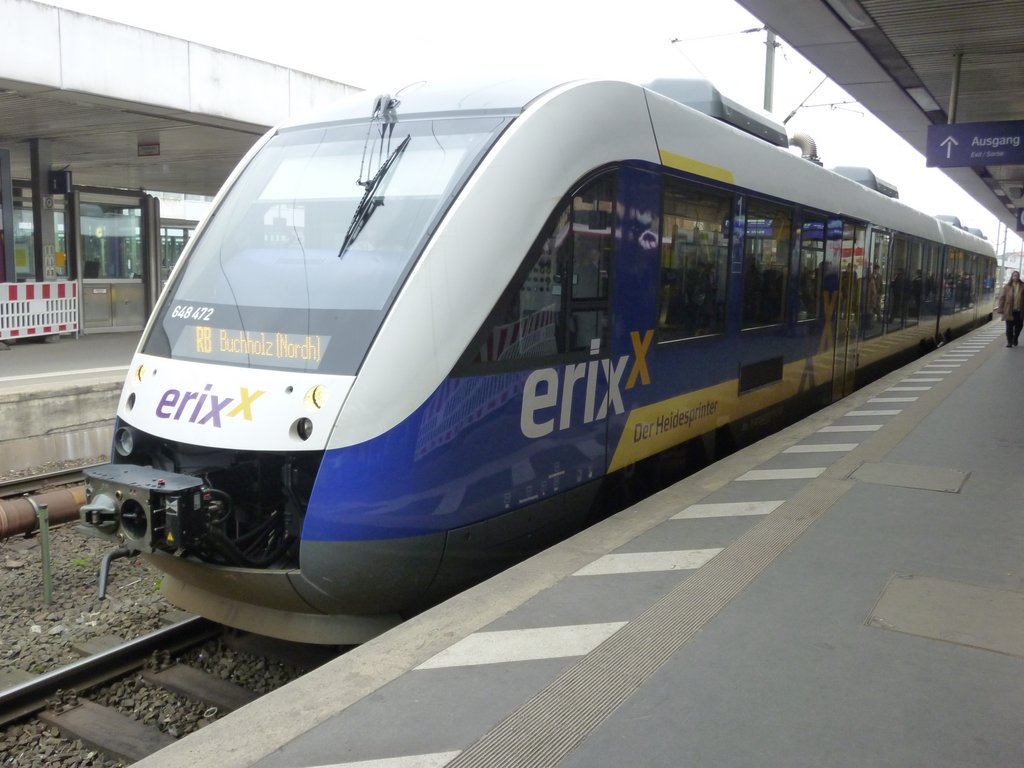
An Erixx train at Hannover Hauptbahnhof

Erixx GmbH (stylized as erixx) is a private railway company operating regional train service in Lower Saxony, Schleswig-Holstein and Bremen, northern Germany. It is wholly owned by Osthannoversche Eisenbahnen AG (OHE). Since 11 December 2011, Erixx operates on behalf of the public transport company of Lower Saxony (Landesnahverkehrsgesellschaft Niedersachsen - LNVG). The name is derived from Erica, the genus of heath plants, and "x", representing the Heidekreuz (heath cross), the services it operated over the Lüneburg Heath until 2021.

== Operations ==
Erixx operated routes RB37 and RB38 from December 2011 until December 2021, which together formed the Heidekreuz. They operated on the Heath Railway and Uelzen–Langwedel railway. From December 2014 until December 2029, Erixx will operate the RE10, RB32, RB42, RB43 and RB47 services in Lower Saxony. From December 2022 until December 2035, Erixx will also operate the RB76, RE83 and RB84 in Schleswig-Holstein.

Line	Route	Line name	Rolling stock	Commissioning authority	Network and contract period
RE 10	Harz-Heide-Bahn	Hannover – Hildesheim – Salzgitter-Ringelheim – Goslar – Bad Harzburg	LINT 54	LNVG, Region Hannover, Regionalverband Großraum Braunschweig	Dieselnetz Niedersachsen Südost (DINSO), lot 2 Dec. 2014 – Dec. 2029
RB 32	Wendlandbahn	Lüneburg – Hitzacker – Dannenberg Ost	LINT 54	LNVG, Region Hannover, Regionalverband Großraum Braunschweig	Dieselnetz Niedersachsen Südost (DINSO), lot 2 Dec. 2014 – Dec. 2029
RB 42	Harz-Heide-Bahn	Braunschweig – Wolfenbüttel – Vienenburg – Bad Harzburg	LINT 54	LNVG, Region Hannover, Regionalverband Großraum Braunschweig	Dieselnetz Niedersachsen Südost (DINSO), lot 2 Dec. 2014 – Dec. 2029
RB 43	Harz-Heide-Bahn	Braunschweig – Wolfenbüttel – Vienenburg – Goslar	LINT 54	LNVG, Region Hannover, Regionalverband Großraum Braunschweig	Dieselnetz Niedersachsen Südost (DINSO), lot 2 Dec. 2014 – Dec. 2029
RB 47	Mühlenbahn	Braunschweig – Gifhorn – Wittingen – Uelzen	LINT 54	LNVG, Region Hannover, Regionalverband Großraum Braunschweig	Dieselnetz Niedersachsen Südost (DINSO), lot 2 Dec. 2014 – Dec. 2029
RB 76		Kiel – Kiel-Oppendorf (– Schönberger Strand)	LINT 41 from Dec. 2023: FLIRT Akku	NAH.SH, LNVG	Akku-Netz Schleswig-Holstein, Los Ost; Dec. 2022 – Dec. 2035
RE 83		Kiel – Preetz – Plön – Eutin – Lübeck – Mölln – Büchen – Lauenburg – Lüneburg	LINT 41 from Dec. 2023: FLIRT Akku	NAH.SH, LNVG	Akku-Netz Schleswig-Holstein, Los Ost; Dec. 2022 – Dec. 2035
RB 84		Kiel – Preetz – Plön – Eutin – Lübeck	LINT 41 from Dec. 2023: FLIRT Akku	NAH.SH, LNVG	Akku-Netz Schleswig-Holstein, Los Ost; Dec. 2022 – Dec. 2035

=== Former operations ===
Line	Route	Line name	Rolling stock	Commissioning authority	Network and contract period	New operator
RB 37	Amerikalinie	Bremen – Achim – Langwedel – Soltau – Munster (Örtze) – Uelzen	LINT 41	LNVG, Region Hannover, SKUMS	Heidekreuz; Dec. 2011 – Dec. 2021	Start Niedersachsen Mitte
RB 38	Heidebahn	Hannover – Langenhagen – Walsrode – Bad Fallingbostel – Soltau – Buchholz (Nordh) (– Hamburg-Harburg)	LINT 41	LNVG, Region Hannover, SKUMS	Heidekreuz; Dec. 2011 – Dec. 2021	Start Niedersachsen Mitte

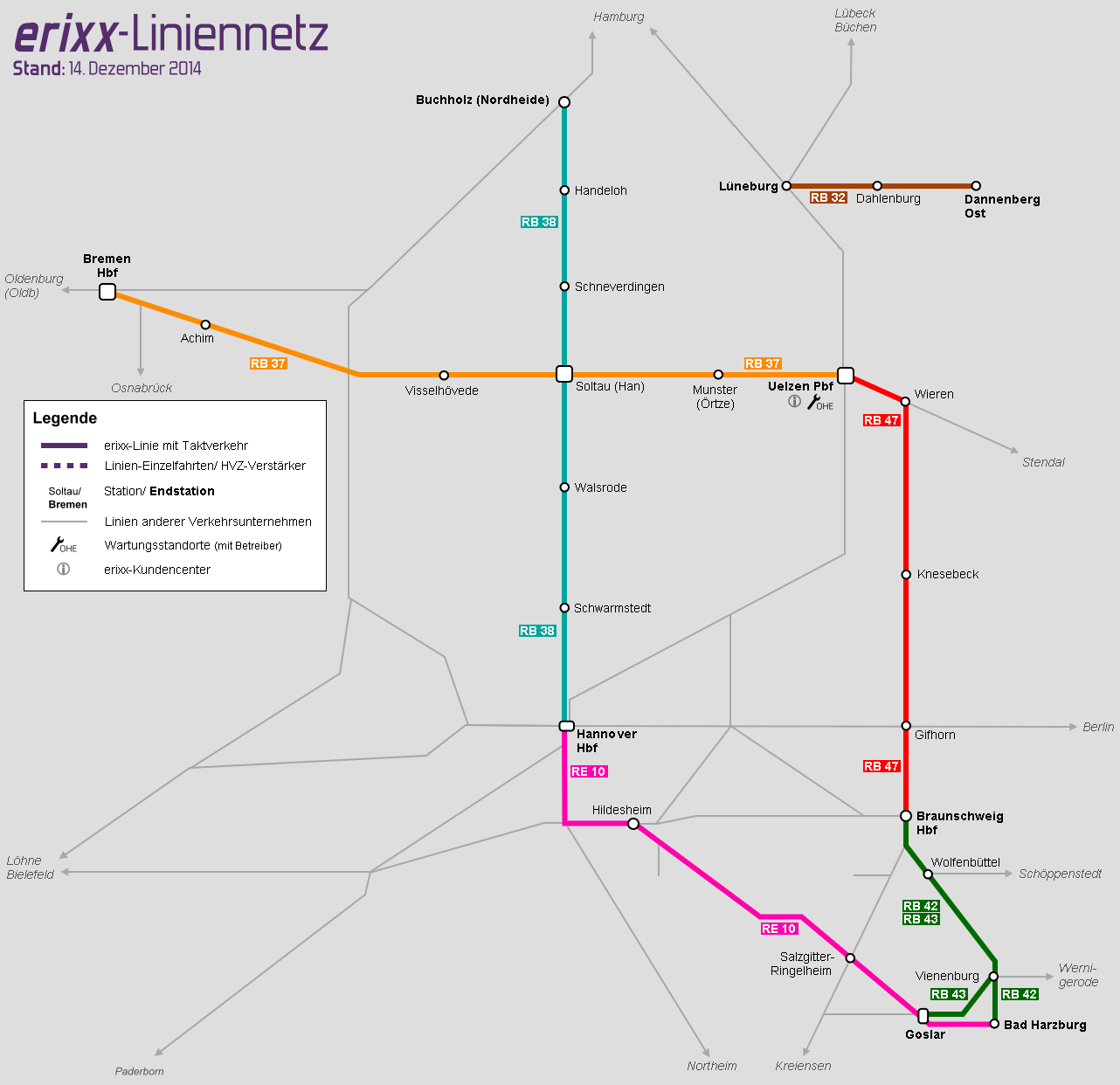
Erixx network as of December 2014.

== Rolling stock ==
Erixx operated a fleet of 27 LINT-41 diesel multiple units on RB37 and RB38. From December 2014 Erixx also uses 28 new LINT-54 diesel multiple units on the new routes.
