= Hamburg-Harburg station =

Railway station in Germany

Hamburg-Harburg
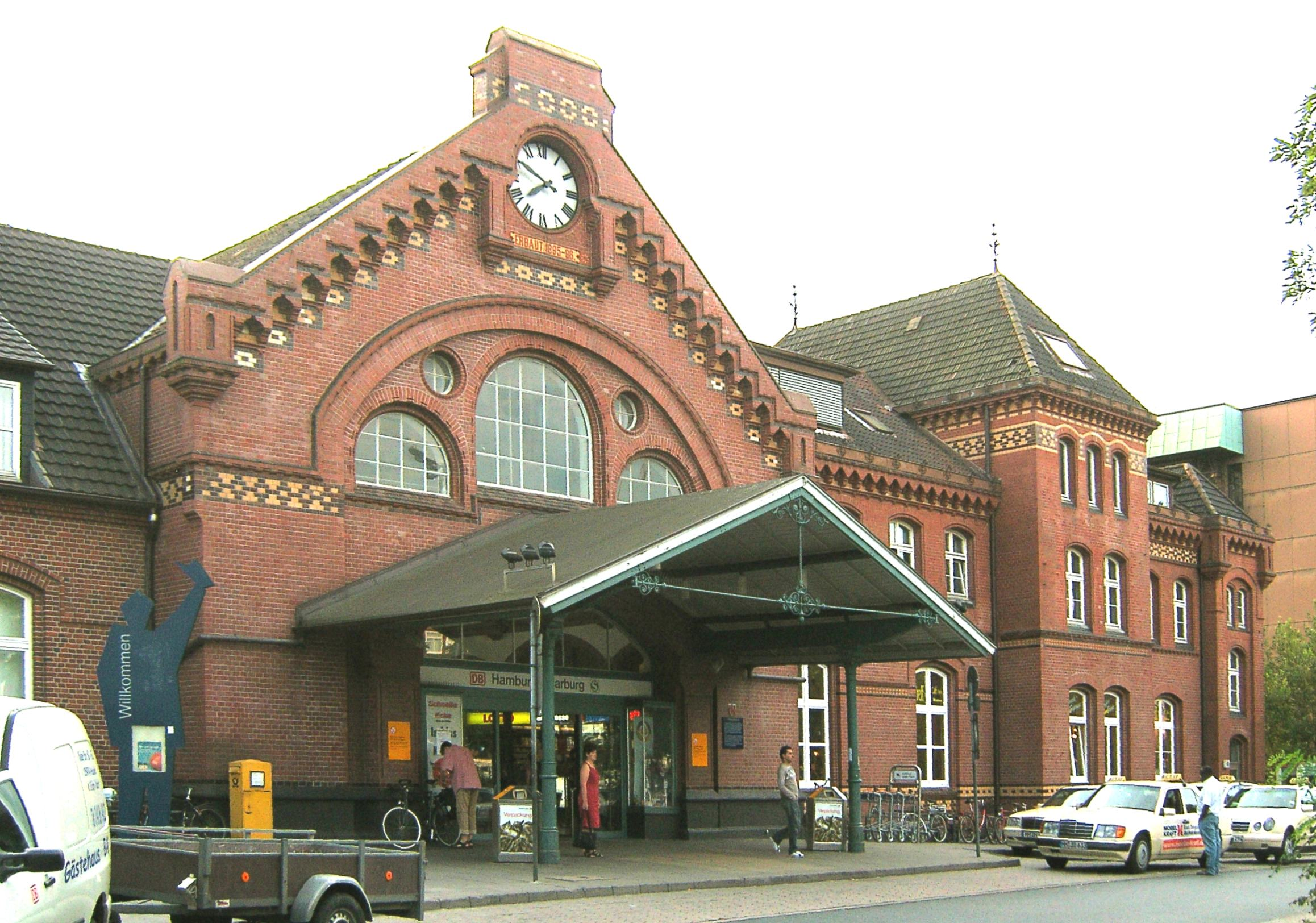
- Station Hamburg-Harburg main entrance (in 2006)

General information
- Location: Hannoversche Str. 85; 21079 Hamburg; Germany
- Coordinates: 53°27′22″N 9°59′30″E
- Owner: DB Station&Service
- Lines: Deutsche Bahn; ICE and regional rail Hamburg S-Bahn
- Platforms: 3
- Tracks: 6
- Connections: Bus

Construction
- Structure type: At grade (Main line); Underground (Rapid transit)
- Parking: Park and ride
- Cycle facilities: Yes
- Accessible: Yes

Other information
- Station code: Main line: ds100: AHAR; DB station code: 2519; Type: Bf; Category: 2 : ds100: AHRS; Type: Hp
- Fare zone: HVV: B/308
- Website: www.bahnhof.de

History
- Opened: 1 May 1897; 129 years ago 24 September 1983; 42 years ago
- Rebuilt: 1983
- Electrified: Main line: 6 April 1965; 61 years ago 1200 volts DC system third rail
- Former names: 1897-1928 Harburg Hauptbahnhof; 1928-1938 Harburg-Wilhelmsburg Hauptbahnhof
Services
Preceding station	DB Fernverkehr	Following station
Hamburg Hbf One-way operation	ICE 11	Lüneburg towards München Hbf
Hamburg Hbf Terminus	ICE 12	Lüneburg One-way operation
Hamburg Hbf Terminus	ICE 14	Bremen Hbf One-way operation
Hamburg Hbf towards Hamburg-Altona	ICE 24	Lüneburg towards Innsbruck Hbf or Schwarzach-St.Veit
Hamburg Hbf towards Westerland (Sylt)	ICE 24	Lüneburg towards Frankfurt (Main) Hbf
Hamburg Hbf towards Hamburg-Altona	ICE 25	Lüneburg towards München Hbf
Hamburg Hbf towards Hamburg-Altona	ICE 43	Bremen Hbf towards Basel SBB, Chur or Brig
Hamburg Hbf towards Hamburg-Altona	ICE 91	Hannover Hbf towards Wien Hbf
Preceding station	ÖBB	Following station
Hamburg Hbf towards Hamburg-Altona	Nightjet	Hannover Hbf towards Innsbruck Hbf or Wien Hbf
Hamburg Hbf towards Hamburg-Altona	Nightjet	Bremen Hbf towards Zürich HB
Preceding station		Following station
Osnabrück Hbf towards Köln Hbf	FLX 20	Hamburg Hbf Terminus
Preceding station	Metronom	Following station
Hamburg Hbf Terminus	RE 3	Winsen towards Hannover Hbf
Hamburg Hbf Terminus	RE 4	Buchholz (Nordheide) towards Bremen Hbf
Terminus	RB 31	Meckelfeld towards Lüneburg
Hamburg Hbf Terminus	RB 41	Hittfeld towards Bremen Hbf
Preceding station	Start	Following station
Hamburg Hbf Terminus	RE 5	Buxtehude towards Cuxhaven
Preceding station	Hamburg S-Bahn	Following station
Wilhelmsburg towards Pinneberg	S3	Harburg Rathaus towards Hamburg-Neugraben
Wilhelmsburg towards Elbgaustraße	S5	Harburg Rathaus towards Stade
Location

Hamburg-Harburg or Harburg (German: Bahnhof Hamburg-Harburg) is one of four operational main-line railway stations (Fernbahnhöfe) in the city of Hamburg, Germany. Opened on 1 May 1897, it is situated on the Hannover-Hamburg, Wanne-Eickel-Hamburg and Lower Elbe lines as well as the Harburg S-Bahn line. Train services are operated by Deutsche Bahn and Metronom with the rapid transit station (named just Harburg) being served by the Hamburg S-Bahn. The station is managed by DB Station&Service.

== History ==
The underground S-Bahn station was opened in 1983.

== Layout ==
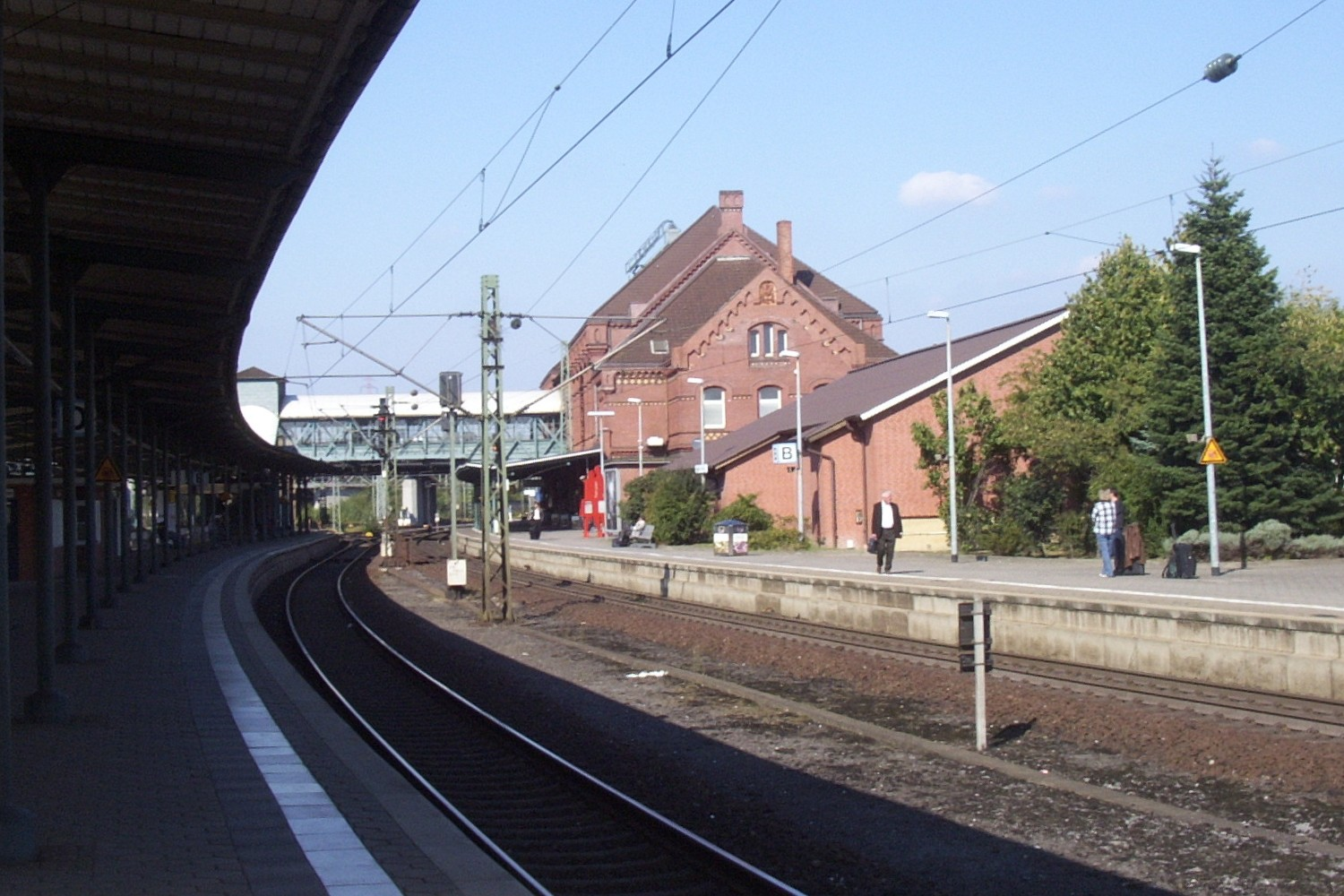
Hamburg-Harburg station (in the foreground: track 5) in 2005

The railway tracks and platforms for the main station are at-grade; the S-Bahn tracks from Hamburg Hauptbahnhof (lines S3 and S5) converge at the underground station.

== Train services ==
In the 2026 timetable, the following services stop at the station:

=== Long distance service ===
Line	Route	Interval
ICE 11	Munich – Stuttgart – Frankfurt – Hannover – Hamburg-Harburg – Hamburg	Some trains at night
ICE 24	Hamburg-Altona – Hamburg – Hamburg-Harburg – Hannover – Kassel – Würzburg – Augsburg – Munich (– Schwarzach-St. Veit)	Some trains
ICE 24	Westerland – Niebüll – Hamburg – Hamburg-Harburg – Hanover – Kassel – Frankfurt	1 train pair
ICE 25	(Lübeck –) Hamburg – Hamburg-Harburg – Hannover – Kassel-Wilhelmshöhe – Fulda – Würzburg – Nuremberg – Ingolstadt – Munich	Hourly
ICE 42	(Hamburg-Altona – Hamburg – Bremen – Osnabrück –) Münster –Dortmund – Bochum – Essen – Duisburg – Düsseldorf – Cologne – Siegburg/Bonn – Frankfurt Airport – Mannheim – Stuttgart – Ulm – Augsburg – München-Pasing – Munich	Every 2 hours
ICE 43	Hamburg-Altona – Hamburg – Hamburg-Harburg – Bremen – Osnabrück – Münster – Dortmund – Bochum – Essen – Duisburg – Düsseldorf – Cologne – Frankfurt Airport – Mannheim – Karlsruhe – Freiburg – Basel	Every 2 hours
FLX 20	Hamburg – Hamburg-Harburg – Osnabrück – Münster – Gelsenkirchen – Essen – Duisburg – Düsseldorf – Köln	1–3 train pairs
NJ	Hamburg – Hamburg-Harburg – Hannover – Augsburg – München	1 per day (night train)
NJ	Hamburg – Hamburg-Harburg – Hannover – Karlsruhe – Freiburg – Basel – Zürich	1 per day (night train)
NJ	Hamburg – Hamburg-Harburg – Hannover – Nürnberg – Linz – Wien	1 per day (night train)

In March 2026 GoVolta services began calling.

=== Regional trains ===
Line	Route	Operator	KBS
RE 3	Hamburg – Hamburg-Harburg – Lüneburg – Uelzen (– Celle – Hannover)	Metronom Eisenbahngesellschaft	110
RB 31	Hamburg – Hamburg-Harburg – Meckelfeld – Winsen (Luhe) – Lüneburg	Metronom Eisenbahngesellschaft	110
RE 4	Hamburg – Hamburg-Harburg – Buchholz – Tostedt – Rotenburg – Bremen	Metronom Eisenbahngesellschaft	120
RB 41	Hamburg – Hamburg-Harburg – Buchholz – Tostedt – Rotenburg – Bremen	Metronom Eisenbahngesellschaft	120
RE 5	Hamburg – Hamburg-Harburg – Buxtehude – Stade – Cuxhaven	Start Unterelbe	121
RB 38	Hamburg-Harburg – Buchholz – Soltau – Hanover (only Sat/Sun)	Start Unterelbe	

=== Rapid transit ===
Lines S3 and S5, coming from the southwest of the city and Stade, continue via the Hauptbahnhof toward Pinneberg or Elbgaustraße in the northwest.

== Buses ==
A bus station served by several bus lines offering connections to places both inside and outside city boundaries is located in front of the railway station.

=== Facilities ===
Parking spaces for both cars and bikes are available. Several shops are located in the station building. There are personnel at the station for ticket sales, information and also assistance for handicapped persons. Lockers and safes, toilets, and SOS and information telephones are also provided.

== See also ==
- Hamburger Verkehrsverbund
- Harburg, Hamburg
- Rail transport in Germany
- Railway stations in Germany
