= Hamburg Hauptbahnhof =

Main railway station of Hamburg, Germany

Hamburg Hbf
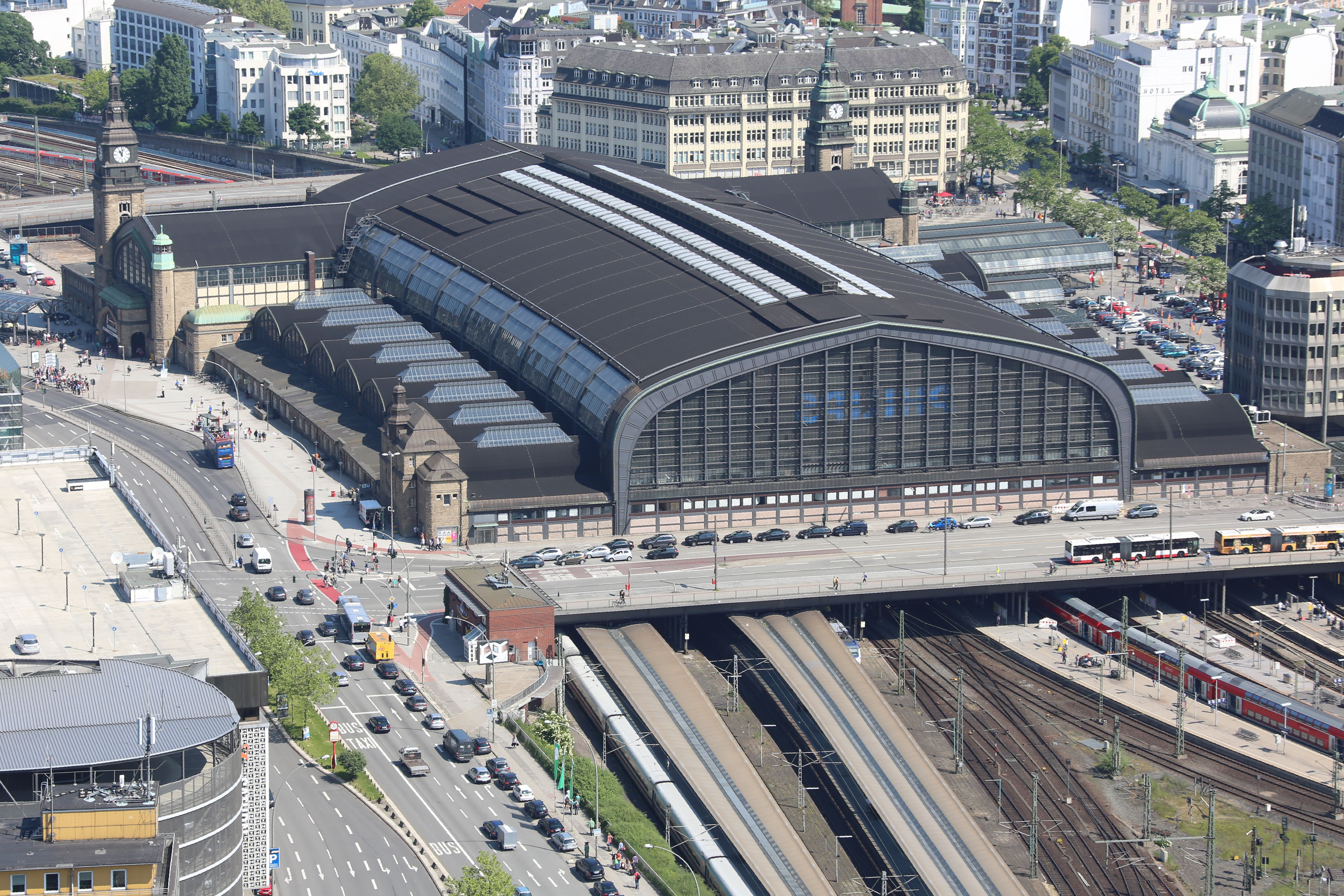
- Aerial view of Hamburg Hauptbahnhof

General information
- Other names: Hamburg Central Station (English translation)
- Location: Hachmannplatz 16, 20099 Hamburg; Germany
- Coordinates: 53°33′10″N 10°00′23″E
- Lines: Berlin–Hamburg Railway; Hanover–Hamburg railway; Wanne-Eickel–Hamburg railway; Lower Elbe Railway; Lübeck–Hamburg railway; Hamburg-Altona link line
- Platforms: 8 main line; 4 S-Bahn; 8 U-Bahn (6 in usage)

Construction
- Structure type: Below grade
- Accessible: Yes

Other information
- Station code: 2514
- DS100 code: AH
- IBNR: 8002549
- Category: 1 IATA: ZMB
- Fare zone: HVV: A/000
- Website: www.bahnhof.de

History
- Opened: 1906
- Electrified: 29 January 1908; 118 years ago, 6.3 kV AC system (overhead; turned off in 1955); 10 April 1941; 85 years ago, 1.2 kV DC system (3rd rail); 6 April 1965; 61 years ago, 15 kV AC system (overhead)

Passengers
- 480,000 (daily)
Services
| Preceding station | DB Fernverkehr | Following station |
|---|---|---|
| Hamburg-Altona Terminus | ICE 1 Sprinter | Essen Hbf towards Passau Hbf |
| Neumünster towards Padborg | ICE 4 Sprinter | Hannover Hbf towards Frankfurt Airport Regional |
| Hamburg Dammtor towards Hamburg-Altona | ICE 4 Sprinter | Hannover Hbf towards Frankfurt Airport Regional |
| Hamburg Dammtor towards Hamburg-Altona | ICE 18 | Ludwigslust towards München Hbf |
| Itzehoe towards Westerland (Sylt) | ICE 18 | Berlin Hbf towards Berlin Südkreuz |
| Hamburg Dammtor towards Hamburg-Altona | ICE/ECE 20 | Uelzen towards Basel SBB or Wiesbaden Hbf |
| Hamburg Dammtor towards Kiel Hbf | ICE 22 | Celle towards Stuttgart Hbf |
| Hamburg Dammtor towards Hamburg-Altona | ICE 24 | Hamburg-Harburg towards Innsbruck Hbf or Schwarzach-St.Veit |
| Itzehoe towards Westerland (Sylt) | ICE 24 | Hamburg-Harburg towards Frankfurt (Main) Hbf |
| Hamburg Dammtor towards Rostock Hbf | ICE 25 | Hamburg-Harburg towards München Hbf |
| Hamburg Dammtor towards Hamburg-Altona | RJ 27 | Berlin-Spandau towards Praha hl.n., Budapest Nyugati or Wien Hbf |
| Schleswig towards København H | RJ 27 | Berlin-Spandau towards Praha hl.n. |
| Neumünster towards Kiel Hbf | RJ 27 | Berlin-Spandau towards Praha hl.n. |
| Hamburg Dammtor towards Hamburg-Altona or Kiel Hbf | ICE 28 | Ludwigslust towards München Hbf |
| Hamburg-Altona Terminus | ICE 33 | Schwerin Hbf towards Ostseebad Binz |
| Itzehoe towards Westerland (Sylt) | ICE 33 | Bremen Hbf towards Köln Hbf |
| Hamburg Dammtor towards Hamburg-Altona | ICE 42 | Hamburg-Harburg towards München Hbf |
| Hamburg Dammtor towards Hamburg-Altona | ICE 43 | Hamburg-Harburg towards Basel SBB, Chur or Brig |
| Terminus | IC 57 | Ludwigslust towards Magdeburg Hbf |
| Schleswig towards Copenhagen Central | ECE 75 | Terminus |
| Hamburg Dammtor towards Hamburg-Altona | ICE 91 | Hamburg-Harburg towards Wien Hbf |
| Preceding station | ÖBB | Following station |
| Hamburg Dammtor towards Hamburg-Altona | Nightjet | Hamburg-Harburg towards Innsbruck Hbf or Wien Hbf |
| Hamburg Dammtor towards Hamburg-Altona | Nightjet | Hamburg-Harburg towards Zürich HB |
| Preceding station | | Following station |
| Hamburg-Harburg towards Köln Hbf | FLX 20 | Terminus |
| Terminus | FLX 35 | Berlin Hbf towards Leipzig Hbf |
| Preceding station | DB Regio Nordost | Following station |
| Terminus | RE 1 | Hamburg-Bergedorf towards Rostock Hbf |
| Preceding station | Metronom | Following station |
| Terminus | RE 3 | Hamburg-Harburg towards Hannover Hbf |
| Terminus | RE 4 | Hamburg-Harburg towards Bremen Hbf |
| Terminus | RB 31 | Hamburg-Harburg towards Lüneburg |
| Terminus | RB 41 | Hamburg-Harburg towards Bremen Hbf |
| Preceding station | DB Regio Nord | Following station |
| Terminus | RE 5 | Hamburg-Harburg towards Cuxhaven |
| Hamburg Dammtor towards Flensburg or Kiel Hbf | RE 7 | Terminus |
| Terminus | RE 8 | Bad Oldesloe towards Hannover Hbf |
| Hamburg Dammtor towards Kiel Hbf | RE 70 | Terminus |
| Terminus | RE 80 | Ahrensburg towards Lübeck Hbf |
| Terminus | RB 81 | Hamburg Hasselbrook towards Bad Oldesloe |
| Preceding station | | Following station |
| Hamburg Dammtor towards Itzehoe | RB 61 | Terminus |
| Preceding station | Hamburg S-Bahn | Following station |
| Jungfernstieg towards Wedel | S1 | Berliner Tor towards Poppenbüttel or Hamburg Airport |
| Hamburg Dammtor towards Hamburg-Altona | S2 | Berliner Tor towards Aumühle |
| Jungfernstieg towards Pinneberg | S3 | Hammerbrook towards Hamburg-Neugraben |
| Hamburg Dammtor towards Elbgaustraße | S5 | Hammerbrook towards Stade |
Location

Hamburg Hauptbahnhof (abbrev. Hamburg Hbf), or Hamburg Central Railway Station in English, is the main railway station of the city of Hamburg, Germany. Opened in 1906 to replace four separate terminal stations, today Hamburg Hauptbahnhof is operated by DB InfraGO AG. With an average of 550,000 passengers a day, it is Germany's busiest railway station and the second-busiest in Europe after the Gare du Nord in Paris. It is classed by Deutsche Bahn as a category 1 railway station.

The station is a through station with island platforms and is one of Germany's major transportation hubs, connecting long-distance Intercity Express routes to the city's U-Bahn and S-Bahn rapid transit networks. It is centrally located in Hamburg in the Hamburg-Mitte borough. The Wandelhalle shopping centre occupies the north side of the station building.

== History ==
Former Stations of Hamburg and new Central station

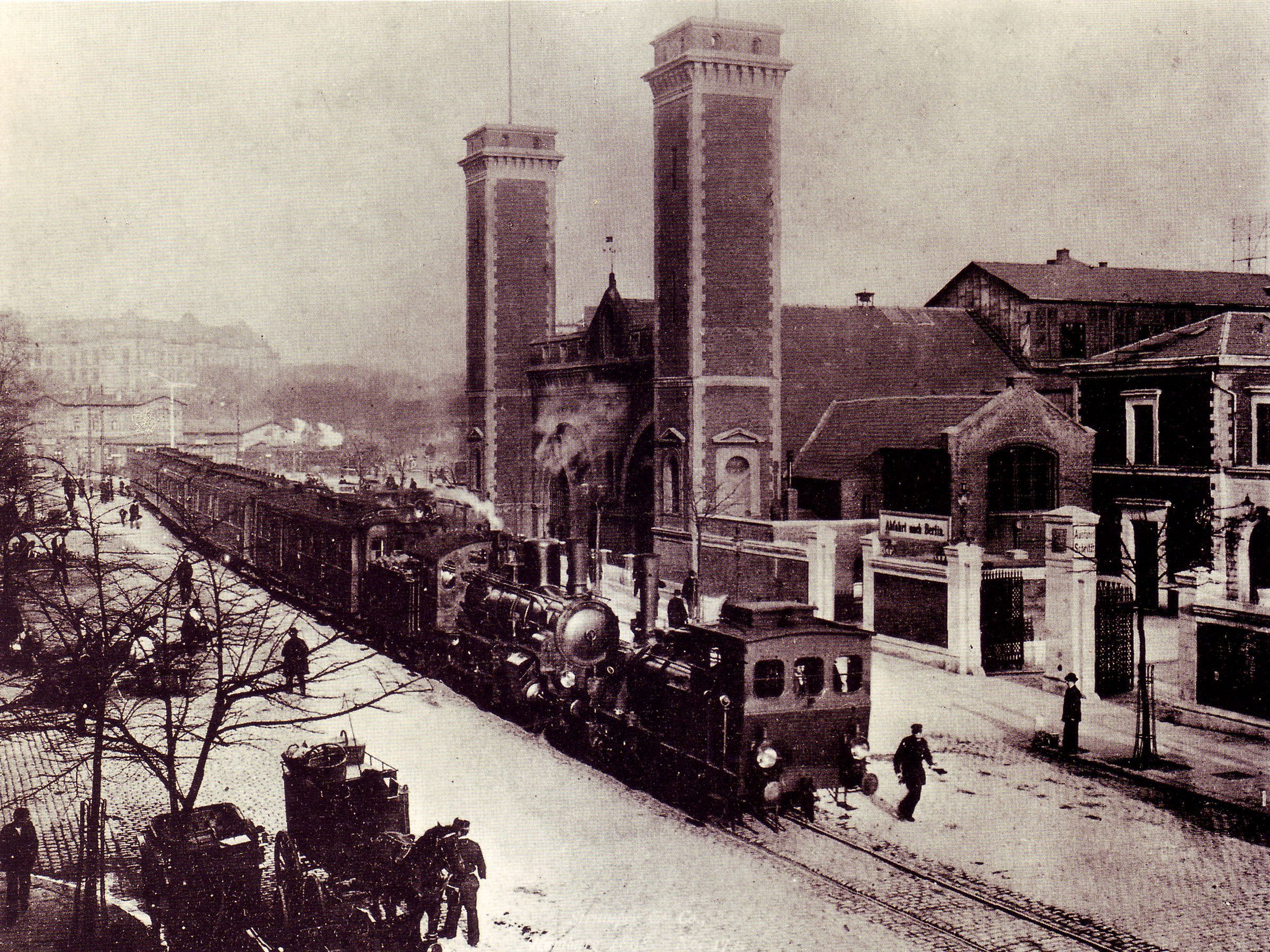
1870s: passenger train on the communication line to Venloer Bahnhof in the street in front of the Hamburg Berliner Bahnhof

Before today's central station was opened, Hamburg had several smaller stations located around the city centre. The first railway line (between Hamburg and Bergedorf) was opened on 5 May 1842, coincidentally the same day that the "great fire" (der große Brand) ruined most of the historic city centre. The stations were as follows (each of them only a few hundred metres away from the others):

- Berliner Bahnhof (1846), on the site of today's Deichtorhallen, on the right bank of the Elbe river; terminus of the line to Berlin
- Lübecker Bahnhof (1865), terminus of the line to Lübeck
- Klosterthor Bahnhof (1866), eastern terminus of the Hamburg-Altona link line
- Venloer Bahnhof (1872), since 1892 named "Hannoverscher Bahnhof", on the line across the river Elbe. (The line splits in Harburg into the lines to Venlo and to Hanover).

Temporary railway lines connecting the stations were built partly on squares and streets. When it was decided to erect a common station for all lines, a competition was arranged in 1900. Built between 1902 and 1906, the Hamburg Hauptbahnhof was designed by the architects Heinrich Reinhardt and Georg Süßenguth, modeled after the Galerie des machines of the World's Fair of 1889 in Paris, by Louis Béroud. The German emperor William II declared the first draft to be "simply horrible", but the second draft was eventually constructed. The emperor personally changed the Art Nouveau style elements to Neo-Renaissance, giving the station a fortification-like character. The station was opened for visitors on 4 December 1906, the first train arrived the next day, and scheduled trains started on 6 December 1906.

On 9 November 1941, during the Second World War, the station was badly damaged by Allied bombing. Several areas needed to be rebuilt completely, including the baggage check and the eastern ticket counters. One of the clock towers was destroyed in 1943.

Between 1985 and 1991 the station was renovated.

In 2021, the City of Hamburg announced a competition to design an expansion of the station as well as the redevelopment of the surrounding area. In December 2022, it was announced that the expansion is expected to start in 2028.

There was a mass stabbing in the station in May 2025.

== Facilities ==
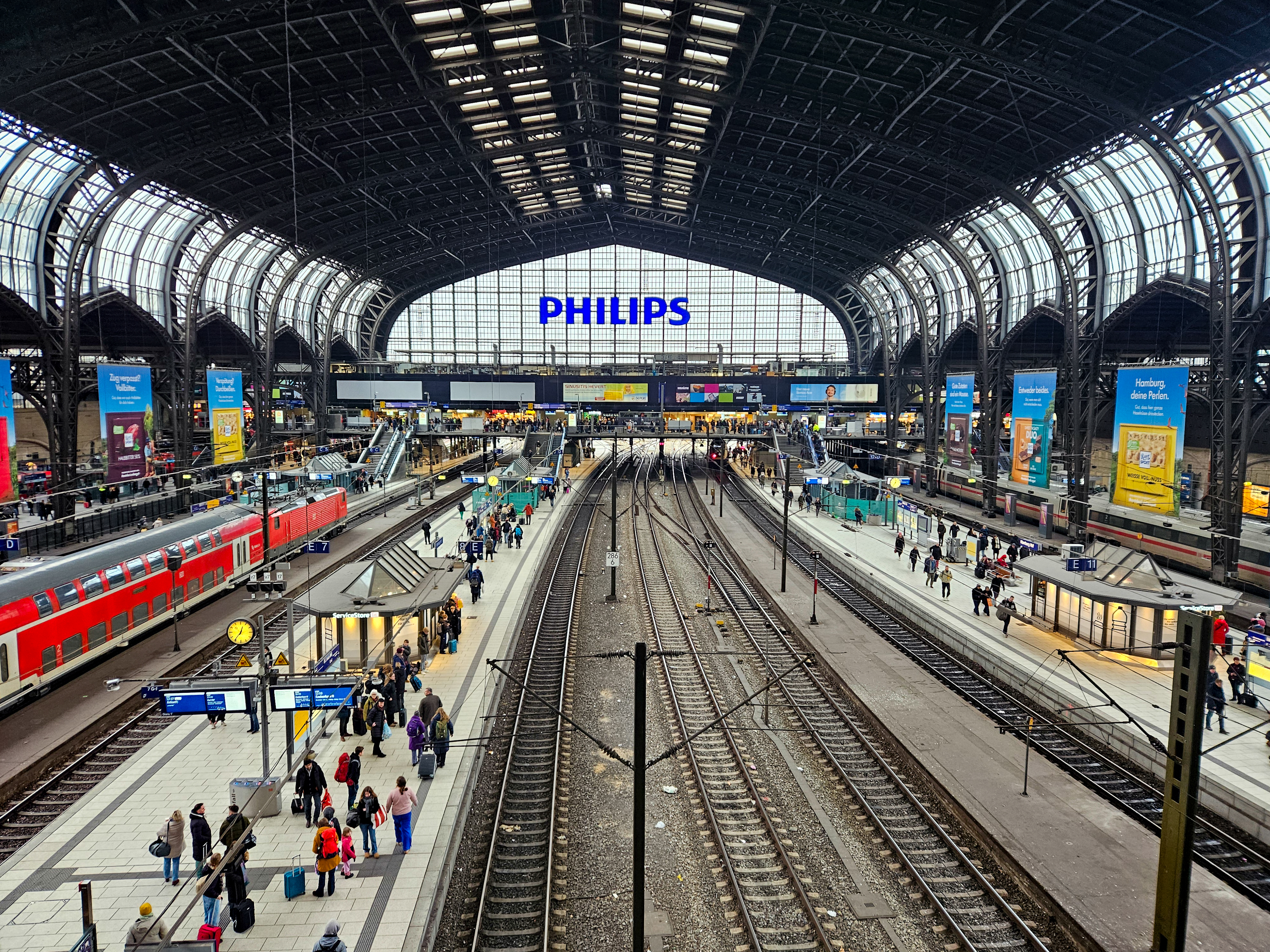
Station hall of Hamburg Hauptbahnhof

Hamburg Hauptbahnhof is 206 m (676 ft) long, 135 m (443 ft) wide, and 37 m (121 ft) high. It has 8,200-square-metre (88,000 sq ft) rentable area and 27,810 m^{2} (299,300 sq ft) in total. The clock towers are 45 m (148 ft), and the clocks have a diameter of 2.2 m (7 ft 3 in). The track shed is constructed of iron and glass and spans the main line platforms and two S-Bahn tracks. The platforms are reached from two bridges at street level, one at each end of the track shed; from the northern bridge by stairs and by lifts, and from the southern bridge by escalators. Two other S-Bahn tracks and the subway tracks are in a connected tunnel system.

The Wandelhalle (Promenade Hall) is a small shopping centre with extended opening hours. It was built in 1991 during the renewal of the beam construction. It is located on the northern bridge and includes restaurants, flower shops, kiosks, a pharmacy, service centres and more. The upper floor also has a gallery surrounding the hall.

Since 2008, in an effort to disperse drug dealers and users from the area, Deutsche Bahn has been playing classical music (e.g. Vivaldi's Four Seasons). According to the German newspaper Hamburger Abendblatt this is a success.

Since 2009, the station has switched all its toilets to water-saving 3.5-litre (0.92 US gal) toilets. In 2012 they started producing Terra Preta in the basement by filtering the excrement and mixing it with charcoal and microbes. The fluids are cleaned and nutrients are extracted. Even pharmaceuticals can be filtered out.

== Train services ==
The following lines connect to the station:

- Berlin–Hamburg railway
- Hanover–Hamburg railway
- Wanne-Eickel–Hamburg railway (to Bremen and the Ruhr)
- Lower Elbe Railway
- Lübeck–Hamburg railway
- Hamburg-Altona link line (connecting to Hamburg-Altona–Kiel railway)

In 2008, 720 regional and long-distance trains, and 982 S-Bahn trains served the station per day. There were 8 platforms for the main lines.

In the 2026 timetable, the following services stop at the station:

=== Long distance trains ===
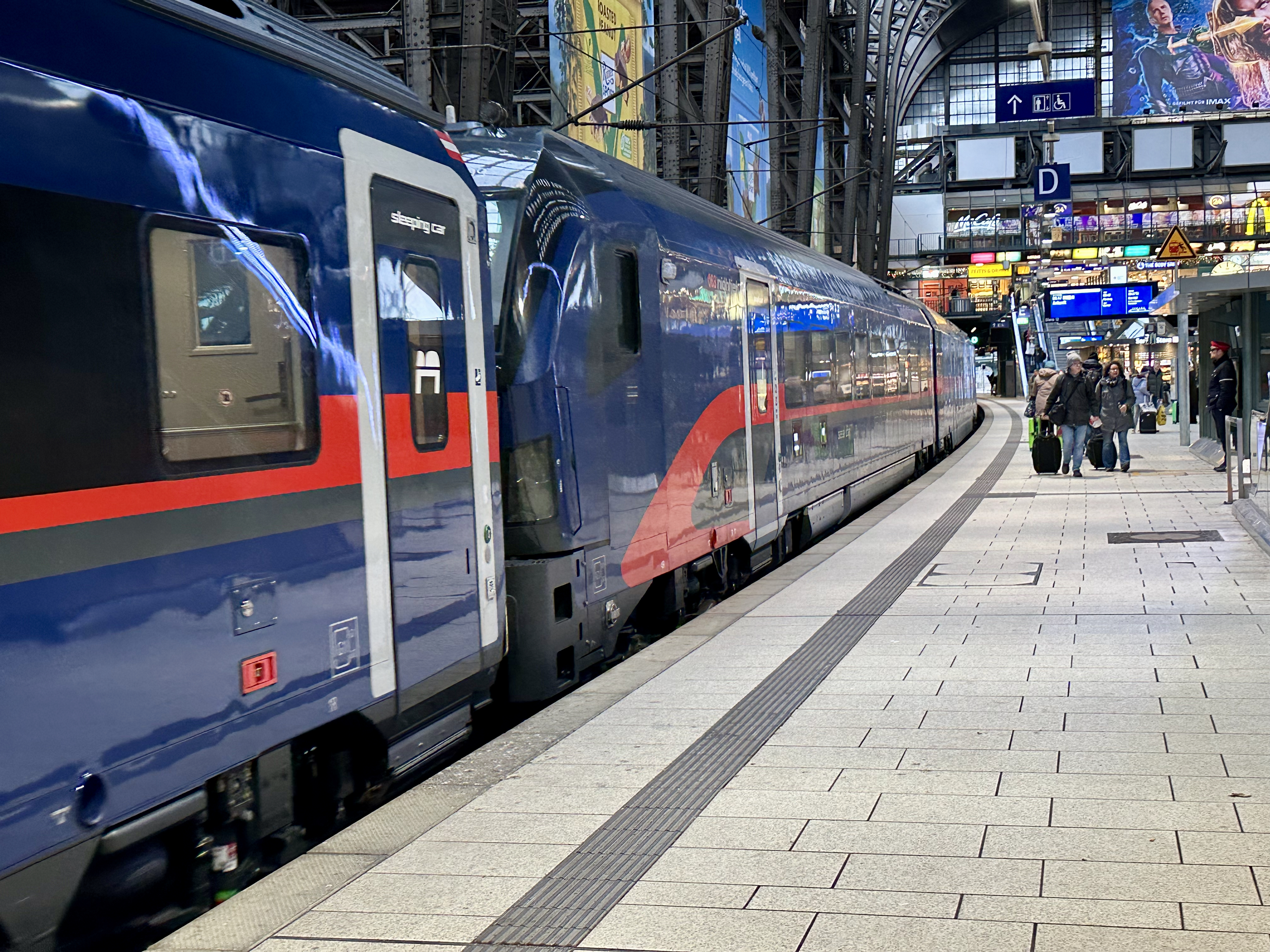
Nightjet trains at Hamburg Hauptbahnhof

Flixtrain in Hamburg Hauptbahnhof

Hamburg Hauptbahnhof is one of the largest stations in northern Germany and connects Northern Europe's railway system, through Denmark, with Central Europe, as well as offering connections to Western Europe and Southern Europe. There are permanent InterCityExpress lines to Berlin, Frankfurt (Main), continuing to Stuttgart and Munich, and Bremen, continuing to the Ruhr Area and Cologne. To the north ICE trains connect Hamburg with Aarhus and Copenhagen in Denmark and Kiel in Schleswig-Holstein. There are also several InterCity- and EuroCity- passenger train connections. The station is a hub for international travel, and most passengers to or from Scandinavia must change in Hamburg.

| Line | Route | | Interval | Operator |
|---|---|---|---|---|
| ICE 1 | Hamburg-Altona – Hamburg – Essen – Duisburg – Düsseldorf – Cologne – Bonn – Koblenz – Mainz – Frankfurt Airport – Frankfurt – Würzburg – Nuremberg – Regensburg – Passau | | Three times a day | DB Fernverkehr |
| ICE 4 | Padborg – Flensburg – | Hamburg – Hanover – Frankfurt – Frankfurt Airport | Every 4 hours | DB Fernverkehr |
| ICE 4 | Hamburg-Altona – Hamburg Dammtor – | Hamburg – Hanover – Frankfurt – Frankfurt Airport | Every 4 hours | DB Fernverkehr |
| ICE 18 | Hamburg-Altona – | Hamburg – Berlin – Halle – Erfurt – Nuremberg – Ingolstadt – Munich | Every two hours | DB Fernverkehr |
| ICE 18 | Westerland – | Hamburg – Berlin – Halle – Erfurt – Nuremberg – Ingolstadt – Munich | 1 train pair | DB Fernverkehr |
| ICE/ECE 20 | Hamburg – Hanover – Kassel-Wilhelmshöhe – Frankfurt – Mannheim – Karlsruhe – Freiburg – Basel | | Every two hours | DB Fernverkehr |
| ICE 22 | Kiel – Hamburg – Hannover – Kassel-Wilhelmshöhe – Frankfurt – Frankfurt Airport – Mannheim – (Heidelberg –) Stuttgart | | | DB Fernverkehr |
| ICE 24 | Hamburg-Altona – Hamburg – Hannover – Kassel – Würzburg – Augsburg – Munich – | Schwarzach-St. Veit | Some trains | DB Fernverkehr |
| ICE 24 | Hamburg-Altona – Hamburg – Hannover – Kassel – Würzburg – Augsburg – Munich – | Innsbruck | Some trains | DB Fernverkehr |
| ICE 24 | Westerland – Niebüll – Hamburg – Hanover – Kassel – Frankfurt | | One train pair | DB Fernverkehr |
| ICE 25 | Hamburg – Hannover – Kassel-Wilhelmshöhe – Fulda – Würzburg – Nuremberg – Ingolstadt – Munich | | Every two hours | |
| RJ 27 | Hamburg-Altona/Copenhagen/Kiel – Hamburg – Berlin – Dresden – Ústí nad Labem – Prague (– Brno – Budapest/Vienna) | | Every two hours | CD/DB |
| ICE 28 | Hamburg – Berlin – Leipzig – Erfurt – Nuremberg – Munich | | Every 2 hours | DB Fernverkehr |
| ICE 33 | Hamburg-Altona – Hamburg – Schwerin – Rostock – Stralsund – Ostseebad Binz/Greifswald | | Every 2 hours | DB Fernverkehr |
| ICE 33 | Westerland – Niebüll – Itzehoe – Hamburg – Bremen – Münster – Essen – Düsseldorf – Cologne | | 1 train pair | DB Fernverkehr |
| ICE 42 | Hamburg-Altona – Hamburg Hbf – Bremen – Münster – Dortmund – Essen – Duisburg – Düsseldorf – Cologne – Stuttgart – Munich | | Every two hours | DB Fernverkehr |
| ICE 43 | Hamburg-Altona – Hamburg Hbf – Bremen – Münster – Dortmund – Cologne – Frankfurt Airport – Mannheim – Basel | (– Zürich – Chur) | Every two hours | DB Fernverkehr |
| ICE 43 | Hamburg-Altona – Hamburg Hbf – Bremen – Münster – Dortmund – Cologne – Frankfurt Airport – Mannheim – Basel | (– Bern – Brig) | Every two hours | DB Fernverkehr |
| IC 57 | Hamburg – Ludwigslust – Wittenberge – Stendal – Magdeburg | | Some trains | DB Fernverkehr |
| ECE 75 | Hamburg – Schleswig – Padborg – Kolding – Odense – Ringsted – Copenhagen | | Some trains | DB Fernverkehr |
| ICE 91 | Hamburg-Altona – Hamburg – Hannover – Kassel-Wilhelmshöhe – Fulda – Würzburg – Nuremberg – Regensburg – Plattling – Passau – Linz – St. Pölten – Vienna | | One train pair | DB Fernverkehr |
| FLX 20 | Hamburg – Hamburg-Harburg – Osnabrück – Münster – Gelsenkirchen – Essen - Duisburg – Düsseldorf – Cologne | | 2–3 train pairs | FlixTrain |
| FLX 35 | (Kiel –) Hamburg (– Salzwedel – Stendal) – Berlin (– Leipzig) | | 1–4 train pairs | FlixTrain |
| Nightjet | Hamburg – Nuremberg (train split) – | Munich – Innsbruck | One train pair | ÖBB |
| Nightjet | Hamburg – Nuremberg (train split) – | Linz – Vienna | One train pair | ÖBB |
| Nightjet | Hamburg – Bremen – Karlsruhe – Basel – Zurich | | One train pair | ÖBB |
| EuroNight | Berlin – Hamburg – Copenhagen Airport – Malmö – Linköping – Stockholm | | One train pair | SJ |
| Snälltåget | Berlin – Hamburg – Copenhagen – Malmö – Linköping – Stockholm | | One train pair seasonally | Snälltåget |

In March 2026 GoVolta services began calling.

=== Regional trains ===
There are numerous RegionalExpress and RegionalBahn services to Schleswig-Holstein, Lower Saxony, Mecklenburg-Western Pomerania and Bremen.

| Line | Route | Frequency (mins) |
|---|---|---|
| RE 1 | Hamburg – Büchen – Schwerin – Rostock | 120 (30 to Büchen) |
| RE 3 | Hamburg – Lüneburg – Uelzen – Hanover | 60 |
| RE 4 | Hamburg – Buchholz – Rotenburg – Bremen | 60 |
| RE 5 | Hamburg – Buxtehude – Stade – Cuxhaven | 60 |
| RE 7 | Hamburg – Neumünster – Flensburg/Kiel | 60 |
| RE 8 | Hamburg – Bad Oldesloe – Lübeck | 60 |
| RE 70 | Hamburg – Pinneberg – Neumünster – Kiel | 60 |
| RE 80 | Hamburg – Bad Oldesloe – Lübeck | 60 |
| RB 31 | Hamburg – Winsen – Lüneburg | 60 |
| RB 41 | Hamburg – Rotenburg – Bremen | 60 |
| RB 61 | Hamburg – Pinneberg – Itzehoe | 60 |
| RB 81 | Hamburg – Ahrensburg – Bargteheide (– Bad Oldesloe) | 30 |

=== Rapid transit ===
Hauptbahnhof Süd
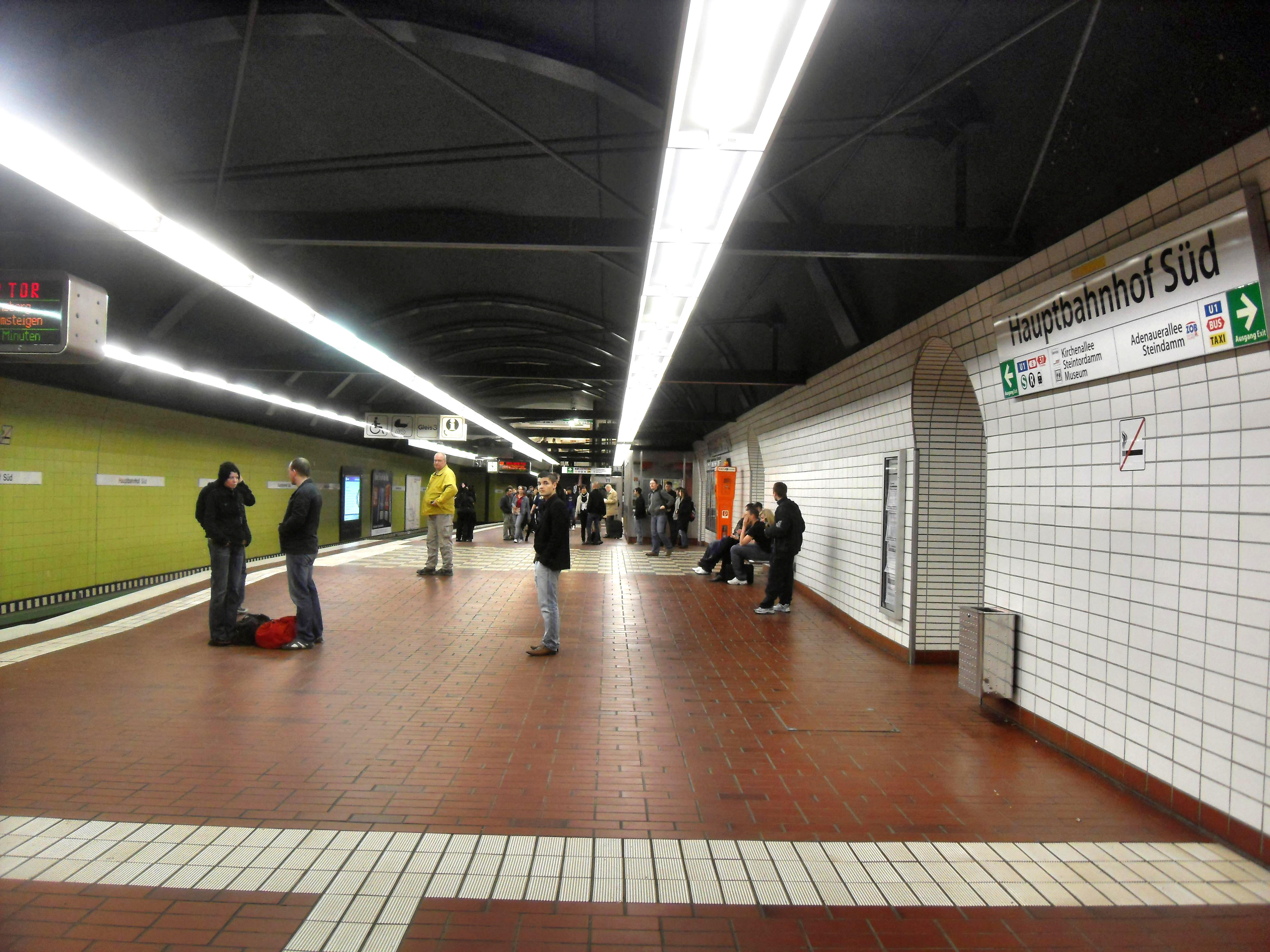

General information
- Location: Hamburg, Germany
- Operator: Hamburger Hochbahn AG
- Line: U1 U3
- Platforms: 2 island platforms
- Tracks: 4

Construction
- Structure type: Underground
- Accessible: Yes

Other information
- Fare zone: HVV: A/000

History
- Opened: 15 February 1912; 114 years ago
- Former names: 1912-1968 Hauptbahnhof

Services
| Preceding station | Hamburg U-Bahn | Following station |
|---|---|---|
| Steinstraße towards Norderstedt Mitte | U1 | Lohmühlenstraße towards Großhansdorf or Ohlstedt |
| Mönckebergstraße towards Barmbek | U3 | Berliner Tor towards Wandsbek-Gartenstadt |
Location

Hauptbahnhof Nord
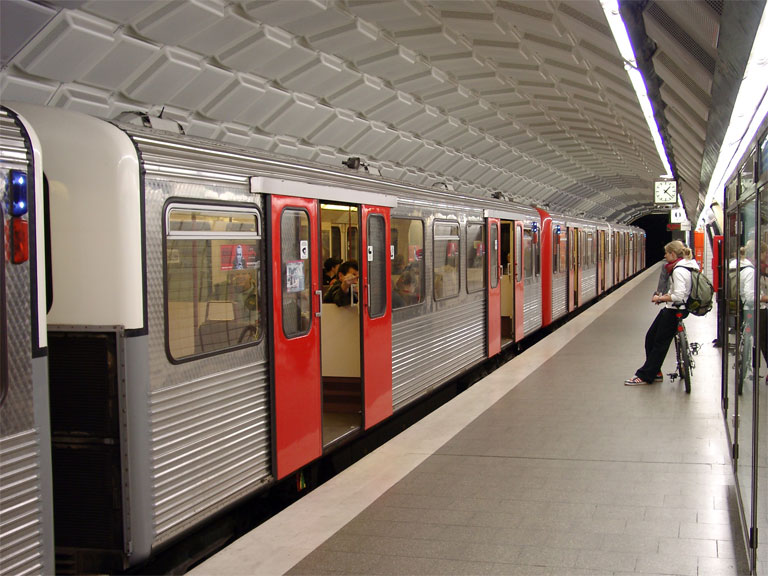

General information
- Location: Hamburg, Germany
- Operator: Hamburger Hochbahn AG
- Line: U2 U4
- Platforms: 2 island platforms
- Tracks: 2
- Connections: Regional and S Bahn

Construction
- Structure type: Underground
- Accessible: Yes

Other information
- Fare zone: HVV: A/000
- Website: hvv.de/en

History
- Opened: 29 September 1968; 58 years ago

Services
| Preceding station | Hamburg U-Bahn | Following station |
|---|---|---|
| Jungfernstieg towards Niendorf Nord | U2 | Berliner Tor towards Mümmelmannsberg |
| Jungfernstieg towards Elbbrücken | U4 | Berliner Tor towards Billstedt |
Location

Beside the inter-urban rail services, the Hauptbahnhof is also the central intersection for two of the three rapid transport systems in the city: the Hamburg S-Bahn (suburban railway) and the Hamburg U-Bahn (underground network).

The S-Bahn platforms are located inside the station itself (platforms 3 and 4, going eastwards to Barmbek, Harburg and Bergedorf) and in a separate tunnel, adjacent to the station building (platforms 1 and 2, going westwards to Altona, Wedel and Eidelstedt).

The U-Bahn is split in two stations: Hauptbahnhof Süd (south) and serving the lines U1 and U3. This part of the station had been included in the 1900 planning for the new station (the construction for the subway started in 1906, the "ring" was opened in four stages between February and June 1912. Until 28 September 1968, this station was simply called Hauptbahnhof without any suffix. There were two lines: the original Ring (opened in 1912) and the southeastern branch line (opened on 27 July 1915) leading to Rothenburgsort, the tracks and stations of which have been destroyed in the Operation Gomorra on 28 July 1943 and never been rebuilt.

The station Hauptbahnhof Nord (north), opened on 29 September 1968, serves the lines U2 and U4.

== Neighbourhood ==
The station is located on the Wallring in Hamburg's city centre, between the districts Altstadt and St. Georg. Directly nearby are the Deutsches Schauspielhaus theatre in the St. Georg quarter, one of Hamburg's state theatres, the Kunsthalle, an art gallery, and the Museum für Kunst und Gewerbe Hamburg, a museum for applied arts. The Hamburg Rathaus is down Mönckebergstraße, centre of a busy shopping district.

== See also ==
- Hamburger Verkehrsverbund Public transport association in Hamburg
- Hamburger Hochbahn Operator of the Hamburg U-Bahn (Underground)
- S-Bahn Hamburg Operator of the Hamburg S-Bahn (Suburban Train)
- Rail transport in Germany
