= Lauenburg–Hohnstorf ferry =

The Lauenburg-Hohnstorf Ferry (German: Trajekt Lauenburg-Hohnstorf or Lauenburg-Hohnstorfer Elb-Traject-Anstalt) was a railway ferry over the River Elbe between Hohnstorf on the left bank of the Elbe in the old Kingdom of Hanover (which became the Prussian province of Hanover in 1866) and Lauenburg in the Duchy of Lauenburg on the right bank which was then part of Denmark. From 15 March 1864 to 1 November 1878 the rail ferry linked the Lübeck–Lauenburg railway with the Lüneburg–Hohnstorf line. Both were sections of the Lübeck–Lüneburg railway.

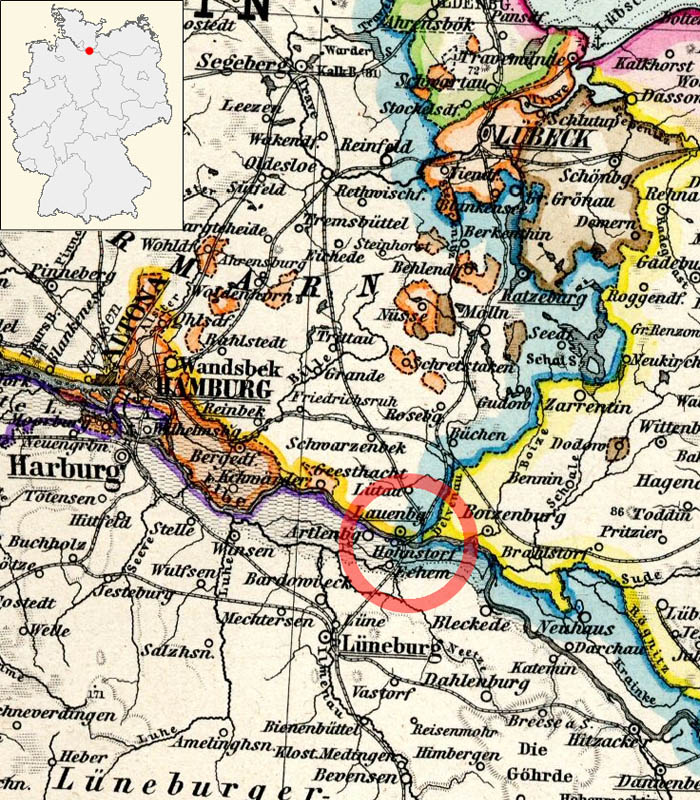
Railway link over the Elbe between Lauenburg and Hohnstorf (1891).

== Ferry operations ==
Annual traffic, 1864–1878 (- = not known)
Year	Passengers	Goods in tonnes
1864	29.662	16.421
1865	35.294	23.648
1866	30.966	22.134
1867	43.984	42.251
1868	39.317	54.822
1869	44.243	84.386
1870	26.598	102.082
1871	-	150.818
1872	-	190.709
1873	-	169.480
1874	27.357	178.611
1875	21.497	115.317
1876	21.443	134.626
1877	23.287	142.132
1878	-	-
