= GoVolta =

Dutch train company

- Industry: Rail transportation
- Founded: 2026
- Founder: Maarten Bastian; Hessel Winkelman
- Headquarters: Breda, Netherlands
- Website: www.govolta.nl

GoVolta is a Dutch railway company that operates international train services from Amsterdam to Berlin and Hamburg.

== History ==
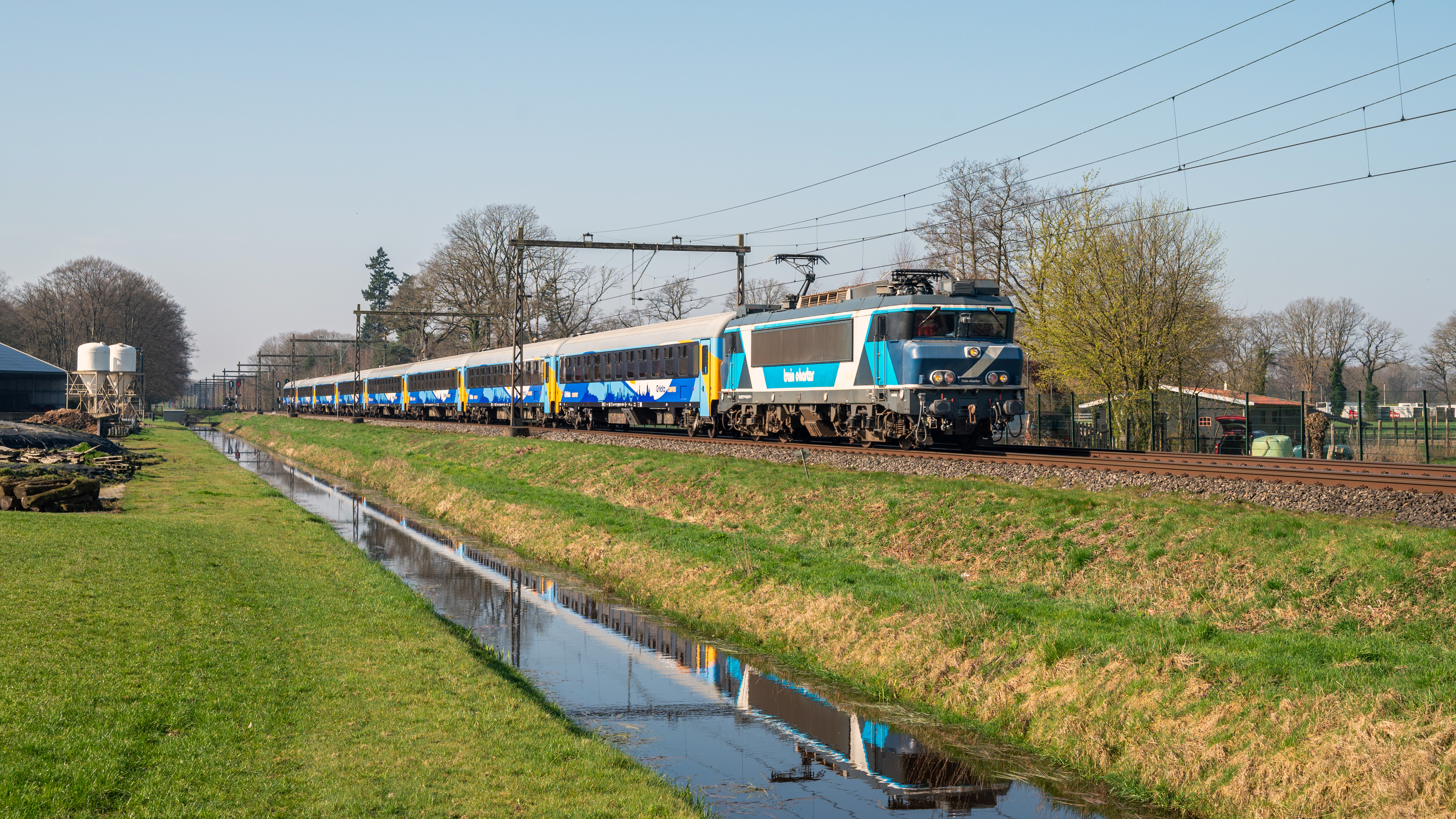

GoVolta commenced operating services in March 2026 from Amsterdam to Berlin and Hamburg on alternate days. Since July 2026 it is operating to Berlin 6 times a week, while it has withdrawn from its Hamburg route.

GoVolta has purchased eleven i10 class carriages from the National Railway Company of Belgium. After negotiations to have Keolis operate the service collapsed, Dutch firm Train Charter Services was contracted to operate with a combination of Vectrons hired from Railpool and its own DB Class 101 and NS Class 1700s.

Since June 2026, the Berlin terminus is Berlin-Spandau. A service from Amsterdam to Paris is scheduled to commence in December 2026.
