= Büchen =

- Municipality
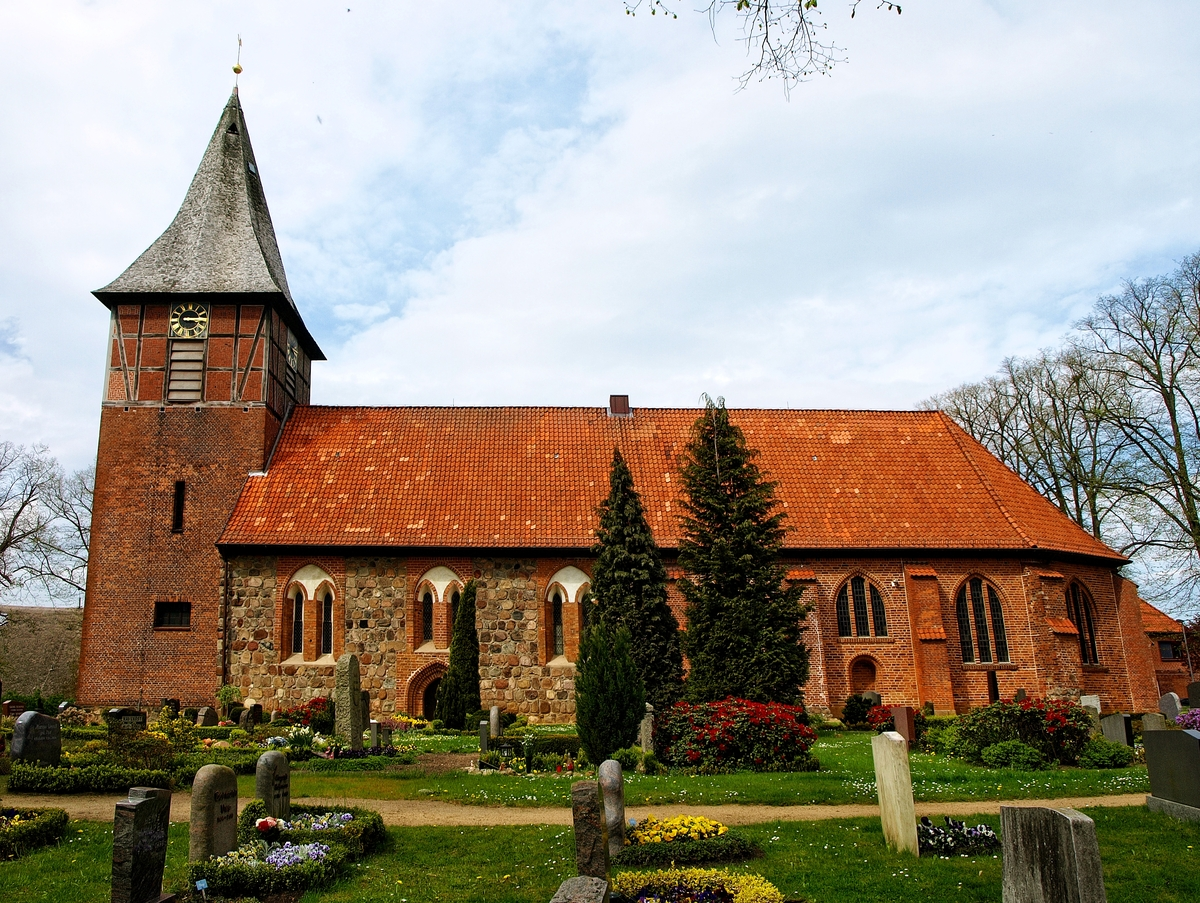
- The medieval church in Büchen

- Coat of arms

- Location of Büchen within Herzogtum Lauenburg district
- Interactive map of Büchen
- Location within Germany Location within Schleswig-Holstein
- Coordinates: 53°29′N 10°37′E
- Country: Germany
- State: Schleswig-Holstein
- District: Herzogtum Lauenburg
- Municipal assoc.: Büchen

Government
  - Mayor: Uwe Möller (SPD)

Area
  - Total: 16.85 km^{2} (6.51 sq mi)
- Elevation: 20 m (66 ft)

Population (2025-12-31)
  - Total: 6,783
  - Density: 402.6/km^{2} (1,043/sq mi)
- Time zone: UTC+01:00 (CET)
  - Summer (DST): UTC+02:00 (CEST)
- Postal codes: 21514
- Dialling codes: 04155
- Vehicle registration: RZ
- Website: www.buechen.de

Büchen (German pronunciation: [ˈbyːçn̩]) is a municipality in the district of Lauenburg, in Schleswig-Holstein, Germany. It is seat of the Amt ("collective municipality") Büchen.

Büchen is situated on the Elbe-Lübeck Canal, approx. 13 km northeast of Lauenburg/Elbe, and 45 km east of Hamburg. Büchen station is on the Berlin-Hamburg and the Lübeck–Lüneburg lines.

== History ==
The settlement of Büchen was first documented in 1230, although the neighbouring village of Pötrau was recorded as early as 1158. The historic centre of Büchen-Dorf developed around St Mary's Church, built around 1200, which became a regional pilgrimage destination during the Middle Ages.

Büchen developed into an important railway junction during the nineteenth century following the opening of the Hamburg–Berlin railway in 1846 and the Lübeck–Büchen railway in 1851. The modern municipality was established in 1937 through the amalgamation of Büchen-Dorf, Nüssau and Pötrau. During the Cold War, Büchen's location near the border between East and West Germany made its railway station an important transit point for passenger and freight traffic between the two German states. Between 1945 and 1990 Büchen served as West German inner German border crossing for rail transport. The crossing was open for trains travelling between the Soviet Zone of occupation in Germany (till 1949, thereafter the East German Democratic Republic), or West Berlin, and the British zone of occupation, later the Federal Republic of Germany. The traffic was subject to the Interzonal traffic regulations between West Germany and West Berlin which followed the special regulations of the Transit Agreement (1972).

== Transportation ==
Büchen lies on the Berlin-Hamburg railway.
