= Metronom Eisenbahngesellschaft =

German passenger railway operator

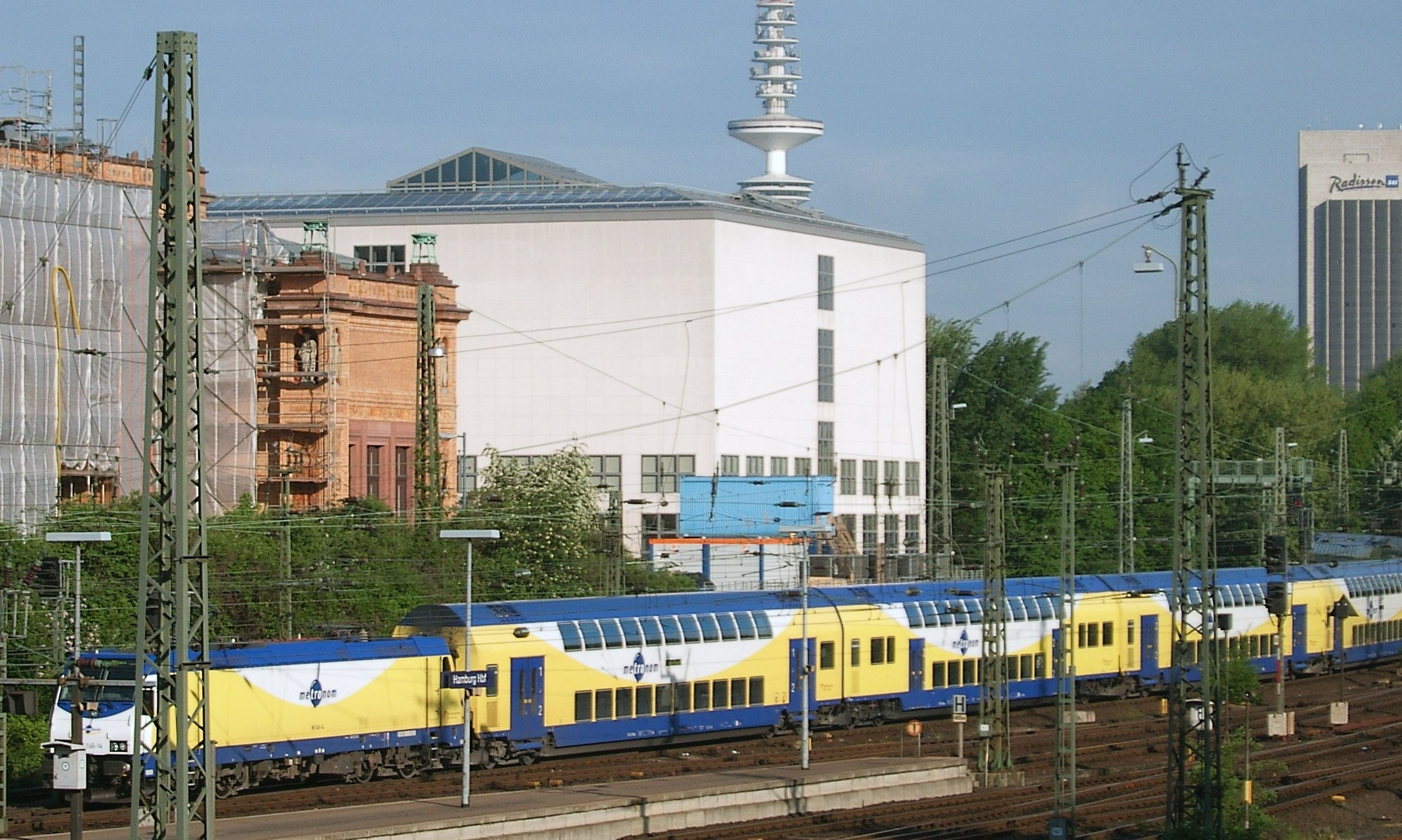
- Company type: GmbH
- Industry: Rail transport
- Headquarters: Uelzen, Lower Saxony, Germany
- Key people: Wolfgang Birlin
- Products: transport
- Net income: ▲€ 163.2 million (2009)
- Owner: NiedersachsenBahn (69,9%); BeNex (25,1%); Bremer Straßenbahn AG (5,0%)
- Number of employees: 320
- Website: der-metronom.de

Metronom Eisenbahngesellschaft mbH is a German partly-state-owned railway company based in the Lower Saxon town of Uelzen since December 2005. The company's activities focus exclusively on passenger transport, operating services from Hamburg to Bremen, Lüneburg and Uelzen, and from Uelzen to Hanover and Göttingen. Services listed on the timetables are abbreviated ME. Furthermore, the company operates services from Wolfsburg to Hanover and Hildesheim under its other brand Enno.

The company's logo, depicting a swinging pendulum, is often rendered in lower case as metronom (the German word Metronom literally meaning metronome).

== History ==
At the end of the 1990s, the three participating States of Germany—Lower Saxony, Hamburg and Bremen—agreed to replace Regional-Express services on the routes between Hamburg and Bremen and Hamburg-Uelzen operated by DB Regio with their own railway company.

The company was founded in February 2002 under the name of MetroRail. The ownership structure has remained unchanged and consists of three companies that represent the individual states and were based almost exclusively in the public domain. Specifically, these are the NiedersachsenBahn GmbH (69.9%), the BeNEX GmbH (25.1%) and the Bremer Straßenbahn AG (5.0%). The NiedersachsenBahn GmbH acts as an operating company and is a union of the railways Osthannoversche Eisenbahnen (OHE) (60%), based in Celle and the railways and transport companies Elbe-Weser GmbH (Eisenbahnen und Verkehrsbetriebe Elbe-Weser) (40%) of Zeven.

In autumn 2003, the company was renamed after a dispute with Metro AG and their current name and the logo were adopted. For 14 December 2003 the operation was established on the lines Hamburg-Bremen and Hamburg-Uelzen.

In April 2007, the majority of the OHE was sold, by the state of Lower Saxony, Germany and the DB Regio AG, after a bidding process to the British transport company Arriva Bachstein GmbH, in which the Arriva Germany GmbH is involved with 86%. As a result, Arriva indirectly controls 30.7% of the capital of the Metronom Eisenbahngesellschaft and so is its largest shareholder.

Metronom does not own vehicles nor maintenance resources. All locomotives and railway carriages are rented by the state transport company Landesnahverkehrsgesellschaft Niedersachsen mbH (LNVG) and are maintained in the depot of OHE Uelzen by personnel of the manufacturer Bombardier Inc. and the OHE. This depot was built specifically for the maintenance of the metronom trains and is located in the north of Uelzen, in the so-called Dannenberger Bogen. The maintenance of the trains by the Eisenbahnen und Verkehrsbetriebe Elbe-Weser for the Lower Elbe Railway takes place in Bremervörde, for this the trains are transferred partly through the route of the former Buxtehude Harsefelder Eisenbahn and partly through the section of the Stade-Bremervörde Moor Express, at the latter three complete units coupled together.

With the monitoring and disposal of its trains, the railway company metronom has also mandated the OHE. From Celle the OHE staff controls around the clock the entire company operations and initiates appropriate measures to stop irregularities (e.g. delays, road closures, personnel failures, vehicle interference).

== Operations ==
The company operates the following services.

Line	Route	Contract dates
RE 2	Uelzen – Celle – Hannover – Northeim – Göttingen	December 2018 – December 2033
RE 3	Hamburg – Winsen – Lüneburg – Uelzen	December 2018 – December 2033
RE 4	Hamburg – Tostedt – Rotenburg – Bremen	December 2018 – December 2033
RE 30	Hannover - Lehrte - Gifhorn - Wolfsburg	December 2015 – December 2025
RE 50	Hildesheim - Braunschweig - Wolfsburg	December 2015 – December 2025
RB 31	Hamburg – Winsen – Lüneburg	December 2018 – December 2033
RB 41	Hamburg – Tostedt – Rotenburg – Bremen	December 2018 – December 2033

== Fleet ==
Class	Image	Cars per set	Type	Top speed		Number	Builder	Built
Class	Image	Cars per set	Type	km/h	mph	Number	Builder	Built
146		N/A	Electric locomotive	160	99	29	Bombardier TRAXX	2005–2010
147		N/A	Electric locomotive	160	99	unknown	Bombardier TRAXX	2019–2020
246		N/A	Diesel locomotive	160	99	8	Bombardier TRAXX	2007
ET 1440		4	Electric multiple unit	160	99	20	Alstom Coradia Continental	2015

== Names of Metronom locomotives ==
- ME 146-01 (146 501) – Scheeßel + 60 Jahre Niedersachsen
- ME 146-02 (146 502) – Lüneburg
- ME 146-03 (146 503) – Bienenbüttel
- ME 146-04 (146 504) – Buchholz in der Nordheide
- ME 146-05 (146 505) – Rotenburg (Wümme)
- ME 146-06 (146 506) – Winsen (Luhe)
- ME 146-07 (146 507) – Lauenbrück
- ME 146-08 (146 508) – Uelzen
- ME 146-09 (146 509) – Tostedt
- ME 146-10 (146 510) – Bad Bevensen
- ME 146-11 (146 511) – Einbeck
- ME 146-12 (146 512) – Burgdorf
- ME 146-13 (146 513) – Alfeld (Leine)
- ME 146-14 (146 514) – Sarstedt
- ME 146-15 (146 515) – Elze
- ME 146-16 (146 516) – Celle
- ME 146-17 (146 517) – Langenhagen
- ME 146-18 (146 518) – Großburgwedel + 60 Jahre Niedersachsen
- 91 80 6146 531-9 D-ME (146 531) - Seevetal-Maschen
- 91 80 6146 532-7 D-ME (146 532) - Seevetal-Meckelfeld
- 91 80 6146 533-5 D-ME (146 533) - Bardowick
- 91 80 6146 534-3 D-ME (146 534) - Seevetal-Hittfeld
- 91 80 6146 537-7 D-ME (146 537) - Stelle
- 92 80 1246 002-0 D-BTK (246 002-0) - Buxtehude
- 92 80 1246 003-8 D-BTK (246 003-8) - Cuxhaven
- 92 80 1246 004-6 D-BTK (246 004-6) - Stade
- 92 80 1246 005-3 D-BTK (246 005-3) - Horneburg
- 92 80 1246 006-1 D-BTK (246 006-1) - Otterndorf
- 92 80 1246 007-9 D-BTK (246 007-9) - Himmelpforten
