= Wittenberge–Buchholz railway =

Railway line in Germany

Wittenberge–Buchholz
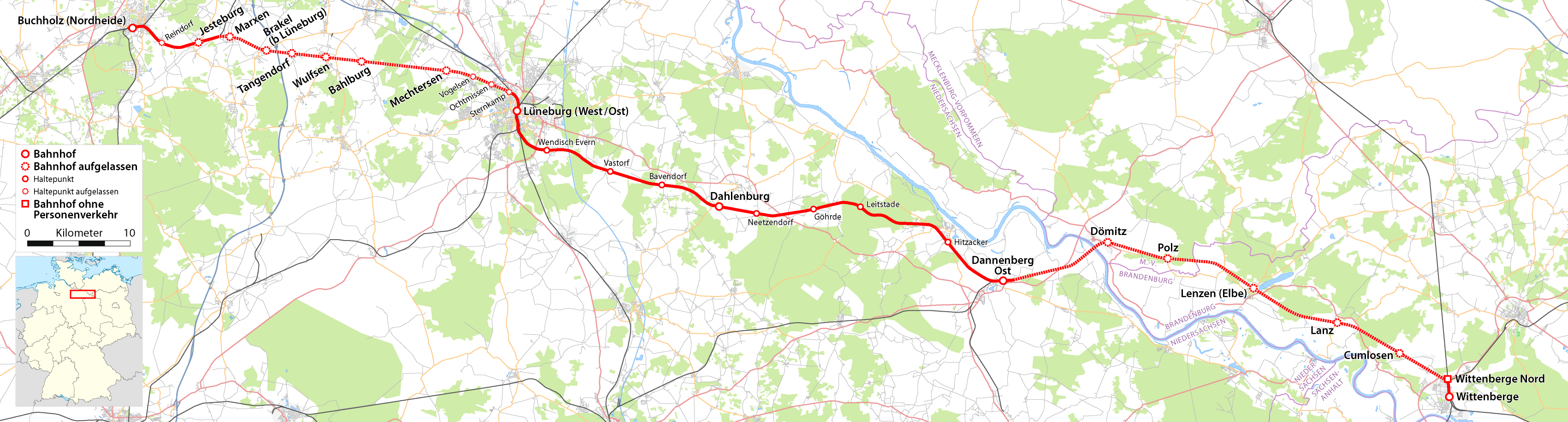
- Route

Overview
- Line number: 1151 (Wittenberge–Buchholz); 1280 (Jesteburg–Buchholz)

Service
- Route number: 112

Technical
- Line length: 142
- Track gauge: 1,435
- Electrification: Jesteburg–Buchholz: 15 kV 16,7 Hz AC
- Operating speed: 60 max.

The Wittenberge–Buchholz railway or Wittenberge–Buchholz branch (German: Bahnstrecke Wittenberge-Buchholz or Wittenberge-Buchholzer Zweigbahn) was licensed to, planned and built by the Berlin-Hamburg Railway Company (BHE) and opened in 1874 as an additional link between the cities of Berlin, Hamburg and Bremen in Germany. It ran through Wittenberge, Dömitz, Dannenberg, Lüneburg and Buchholz and was originally to have been extended to Bremerhaven.

The single-tracked main line ran through the present-day states of Brandenburg, Mecklenburg-Vorpommern and Lower Saxony. With the destruction of the bridge over the Elbe at Dömitz at the end of the Second World War and the subsequent division of Germany it suddenly lost its importance and, as a result, was partially closed.

Today two sections of the line are still open: the longer one of the two between Dannenberg and Lüneburg in the Wendland is known today as the Wendland Railway (Wendlandbahn); whilst western end of the shorter section from Buchholz to Jesteburg merges into the line to the Maschen Marshalling Yard.

The freight carried on the line includes the transport of nuclear waste containers with radioactive waste to a terminal at the end of the track one kilometre east of the Dannenberg Ost station, where it is off loaded for further transport by road to a nuclear waste storage facility. This was subject to blockading by anti-nuclear activists in November 2010.

== Literature ==
- Dietmar Ramuschkat, „Berlin–Bremen via Wittenberge–Lüneburg–Buchholz. Eine Eisenbahnlinie entsteht“, videel, Niebüll 2002, ISBN 3-89906-316-3
- Wolfgang Fiegenbaum, Wolfgang Klee, „Abschied from der Schiene, Stillgelegte railways im Personenverkehr Deutschlands 1980–1985“, Motorbuch (S. 22ff), Stuttgart 1988, ISBN 3-613-01191-3
- „Eisenbahnatlas Deutschland“, Ausgabe 2007/2008, Verlag Schweers + Wall GmbH, 6. Auflage (April 2007), ISBN 978-3-89494-136-9
