= Lübeck–Lüneburg railway =

Railway line in Germany

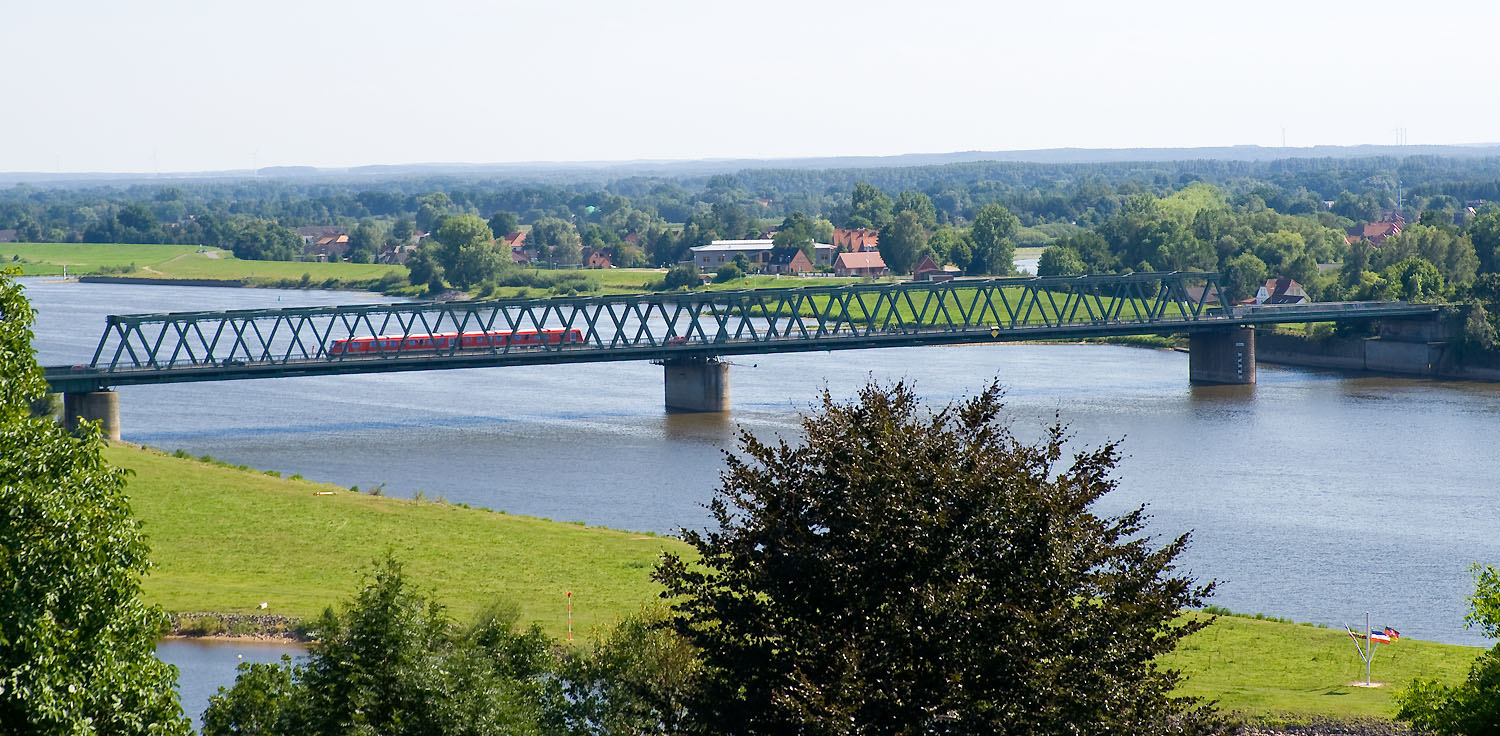
- A local train crosses the Elbe near Lauenburg.

Overview
- Line number: 1122 (Lübeck Hbf–Lübeck Hgbf junction); 1121 (Lübeck Hgbf junction–Büchen); 1150 (Büchen–Lüneburg)
- Locale: Schleswig-Holstein and Lower Saxony, Germany

Service
- Route number: 145

Technical
- Line length: 77.3 km (48.0 mi)
- Track gauge: 1,435 mm (4 ft 8 1/2 in) standard gauge
- Operating speed: 120 km/h (74.6 mph) (maximum)
- Maximum incline: < 2.0%

The Lübeck–Lüneburg railway line is a 77-kilometre-long, single-track, non-electrified rail link from Lübeck on the Baltic coast of the German state of Schleswig-Holstein to Lüneburg in Lower Saxony. The line was opened in sections between 1851 and 1864 and is one of the oldest railways in Germany.

== Route ==
The line is a non-electrified main line that is equipped with GSM-R digital radio. The line has a speed limit of 120 km/h. The infrastructure-owner, DB Netze classifies the line as D4 class, permitting a maximum axle load of 22.5 tonnes and linear loads of 8.0 tonnes/metre.

== History ==
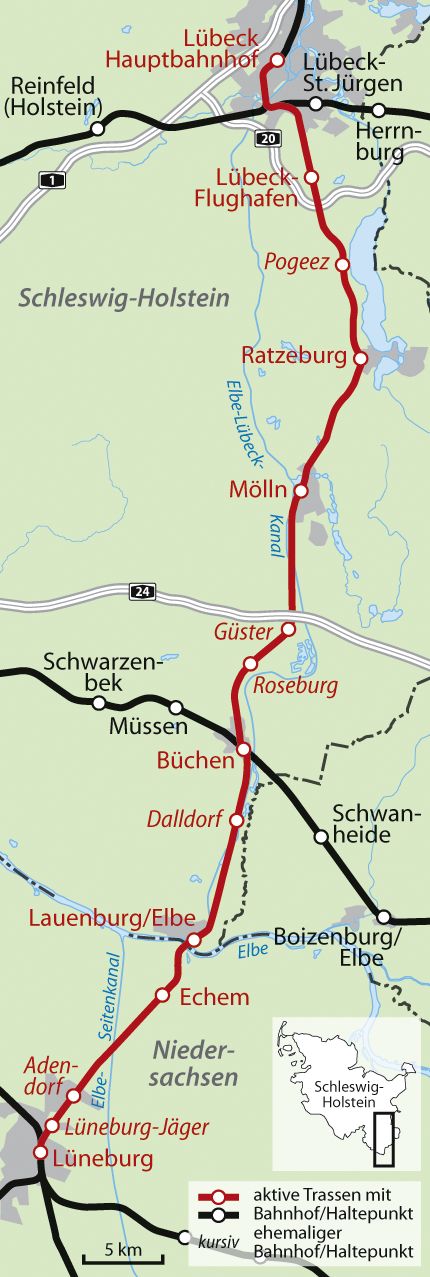
Map of the Lübeck–Lüneburg line

The Lübeck–Büchen section was opened in 1851 by the Lübeck-Büchen Railway Company (German: Lübeck-Büchener Eisenbahngesellschaft), after negotiations failed to agree on a direct connection between Lübeck and Hamburg through Holstein-Glückstadt, which was ruled by the King of Denmark. The section between Büchen and Lauenburg on the Elbe was built by the Berlin-Hamburg Railway Company and opened in 1851. In 1864, the Lauenburg–Hohnstorf train ferry was opened, establishing a connection to the Hanover rail network. The line was part of the shortest rail link from Hamburg to Hanover until the rail bridge over the Elbe in Hamburg was opened in 1872.

In 1865, the Lübeck-Büchen Railway Company, which retained its name, opened the direct Lübeck–Oldesloe–Hamburg line.

In 1878, an entirely iron bridge was built over the Elbe in Lauenburg, replacing the train ferry.

Until 1937, travellers from Lauenburg benefitted from the Lauenburg privilege (Lauenburger Privileg), allowing them to travel on the Berlin-Hamburg railway without having to pay for travel on the Lauenburg–Büchen section.

At the end of the 1980s, several long-distance services on the bird flight line to Denmark used the Lübeck–Lüneburg line to bypass the Hamburg rail node.

A new station was opened at Lübeck-Hochschulstadtteil (the university district) northwest of Lübeck Airport in December 2013.

== Operations ==
The line has been served by Regionalbahn trains, operated by DB Regio, at an hourly frequency since December 2009, using class 648 diesel multiple units. Rates on the Ratzeburg–Lüneburg section are set by the Hamburg Transport Association (Hamburg Transport Association); rates on the Lübeck–Lauenburg section are set in accordance with the Schleswig-Holstein-Tarif. Little freight transport uses the route.

On 26 May 2008, a station was opened at Lübeck Airport (Lübeck-Flughafen). At the same time, an electronic interlocking was established in Lübeck, replacing six old signal boxes in Pogeez, Ratzeburg, Mölln and Güster. In addition, another platform was built in Ratzeburg to enable train crossings. This meant that the train could cross in Pogeez, Ratzeburg, Mölln, Büchen, Lauenburg, and at the Jäger operations station, north of Lüneburg.

== Future ==
In the long term, it is planned to operate services from Lübeck Airport and Ratzeburg to Lübeck at a half-hourly frequency. In addition, the route will be electrified and double-tracked to connect with the proposed Fehmarn Belt tunnel by about 2022. The line will then be used as a secondary route for freight trains. The main line will be the Lübeck–Hamburg railway.

== See also ==
- Old Salt Route
