= Überseequartier station =

Railway station in Hamburg, Germany

Überseequartier
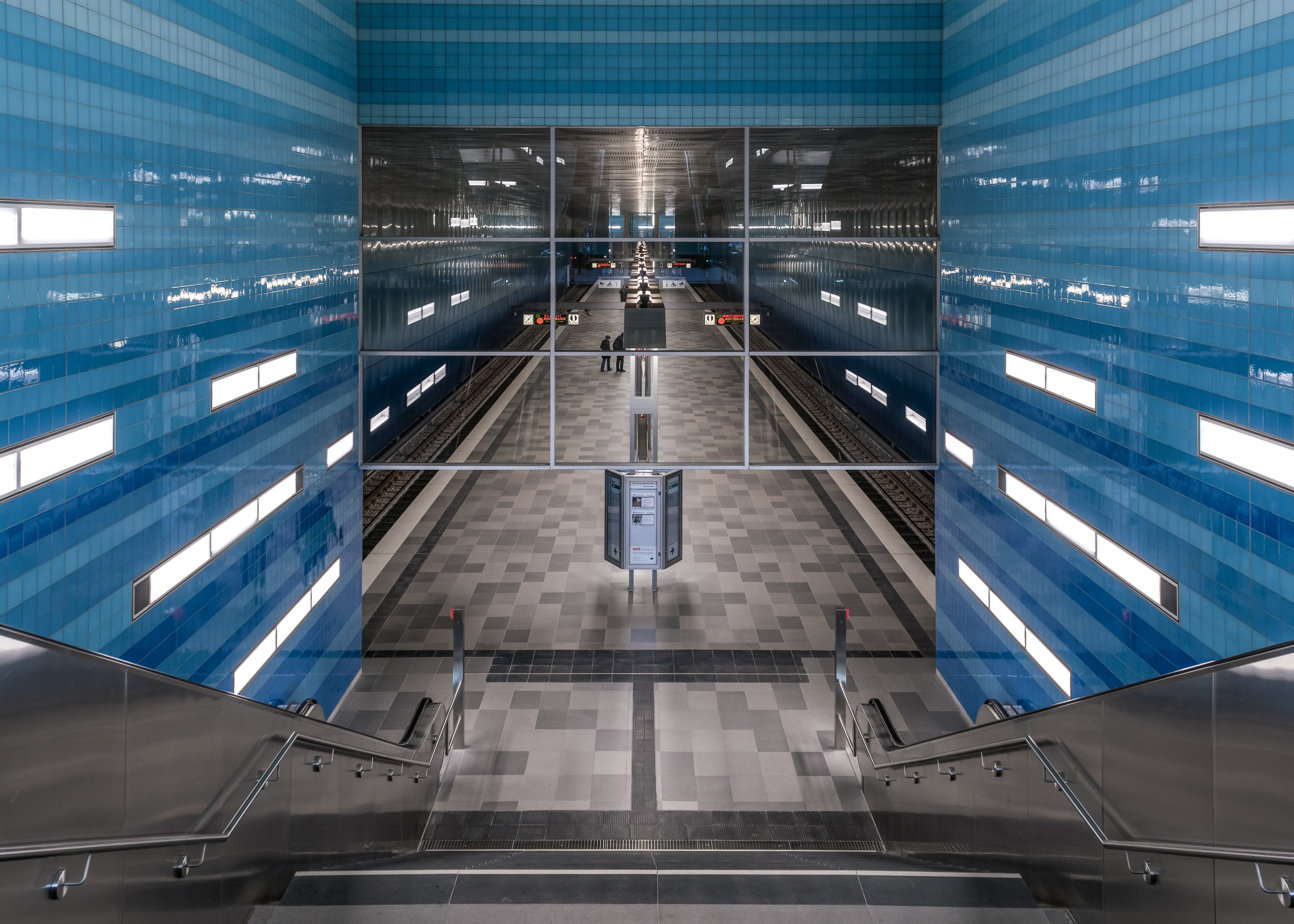

General information
- Location: Überseeallee; 20457 Hamburg, Germany
- Coordinates: 53°32′26″N 09°59′56″E
- System: Hamburg U-Bahn station
- Operator: Hamburger Hochbahn AG
- Line: U4
- Platforms: 1 island platform
- Tracks: 2

Construction
- Structure type: Underground
- Accessible: Yes

Other information
- Station code: HHA: UR
- Fare zone: HVV: A/000

History
- Opened: 29 November 2012

Services
Preceding station	Hamburg U-Bahn	Following station
HafenCity Universität towards Elbbrücken	U4	Jungfernstieg towards Billstedt
Location
- Location within Hamburg Location within Schleswig-Holstein Location within Germany Location within Europe

Überseequartier is a station on the Hamburg U-Bahn line U4. The station was opened in November 2012 and is located in the Hamburg quarter of HafenCity, Germany. HafenCity is part of the borough of Hamburg-Mitte. The station code is "UR".

== Architecture and Art ==
The stop was designed by the Netzwerkarchitekten architecture studio from Darmstadt. The walls are clad in blue ceramic-coated glass tiles that get darker the further down they go, recalling the undersea world. Silver-colored plates on the ceiling give the impression of a water surface. This underwater theme ties in with the fact that the neighborhood is next to the harbor, and with the name of the stop, which translates as "Overseas Quarter", where the overseas part would provide the seafaring theme; a playful interpretation of "over-seas" could see the neighborhood as over the sea and the metro station as below it - and hence, underwater.

The underwater impression is heightened by a sound installation where speakers broadcast underwater sounds such as waves and other marine noises, acoustically amplifying the visual impression.

In a showcase on the platform, on permanent loan from the Hamburg International Maritime Museum, is a 1:100-scale model of the Queen Elizabeth 2 (a British passenger ship that ran from 1969 to 2008), built by Günther Nitz.

== Service ==
=== Trains ===
Überseequartier is served by Hamburg U-Bahn line U4; departures are every 5 minutes.

== Gallery ==
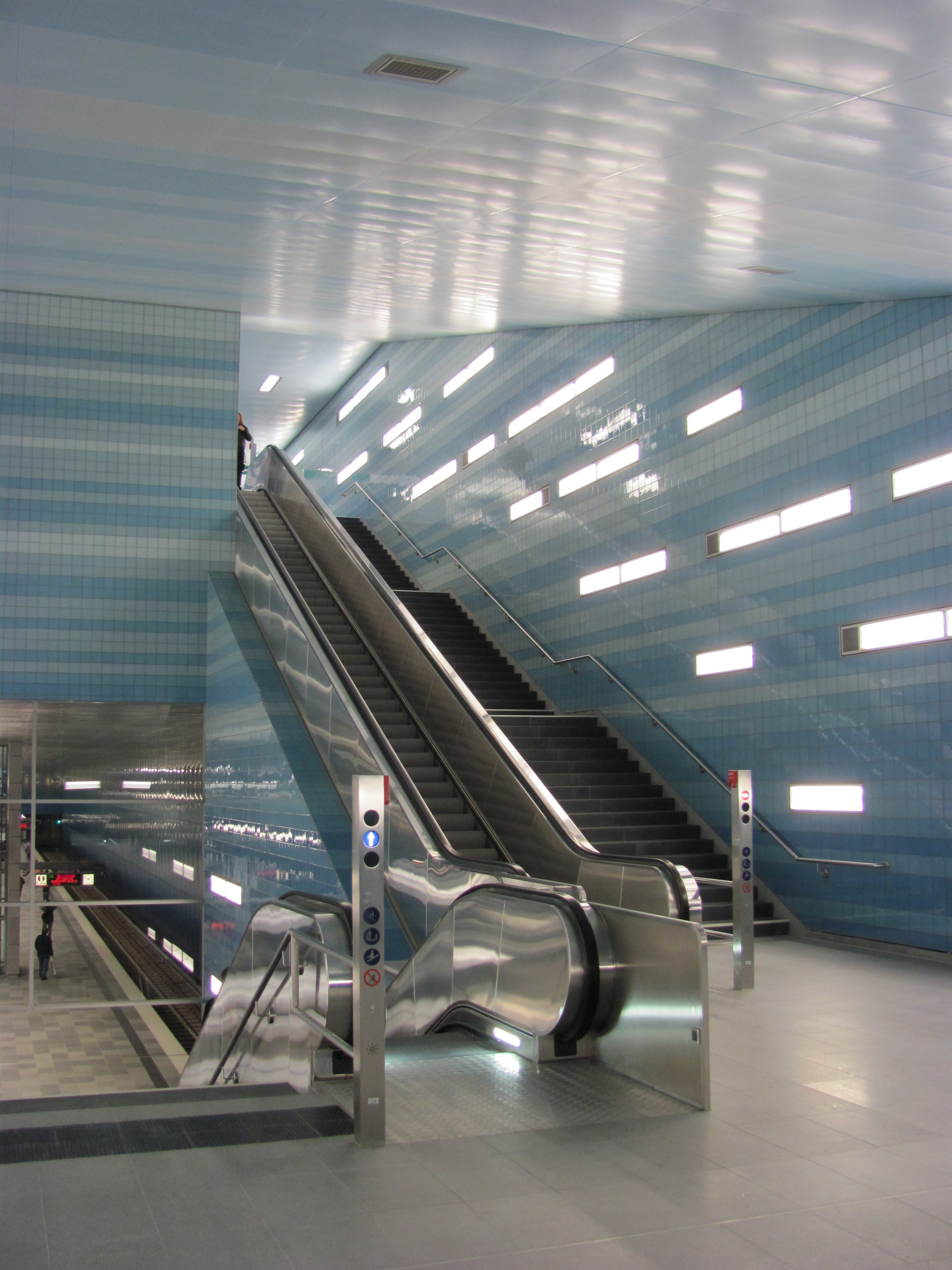

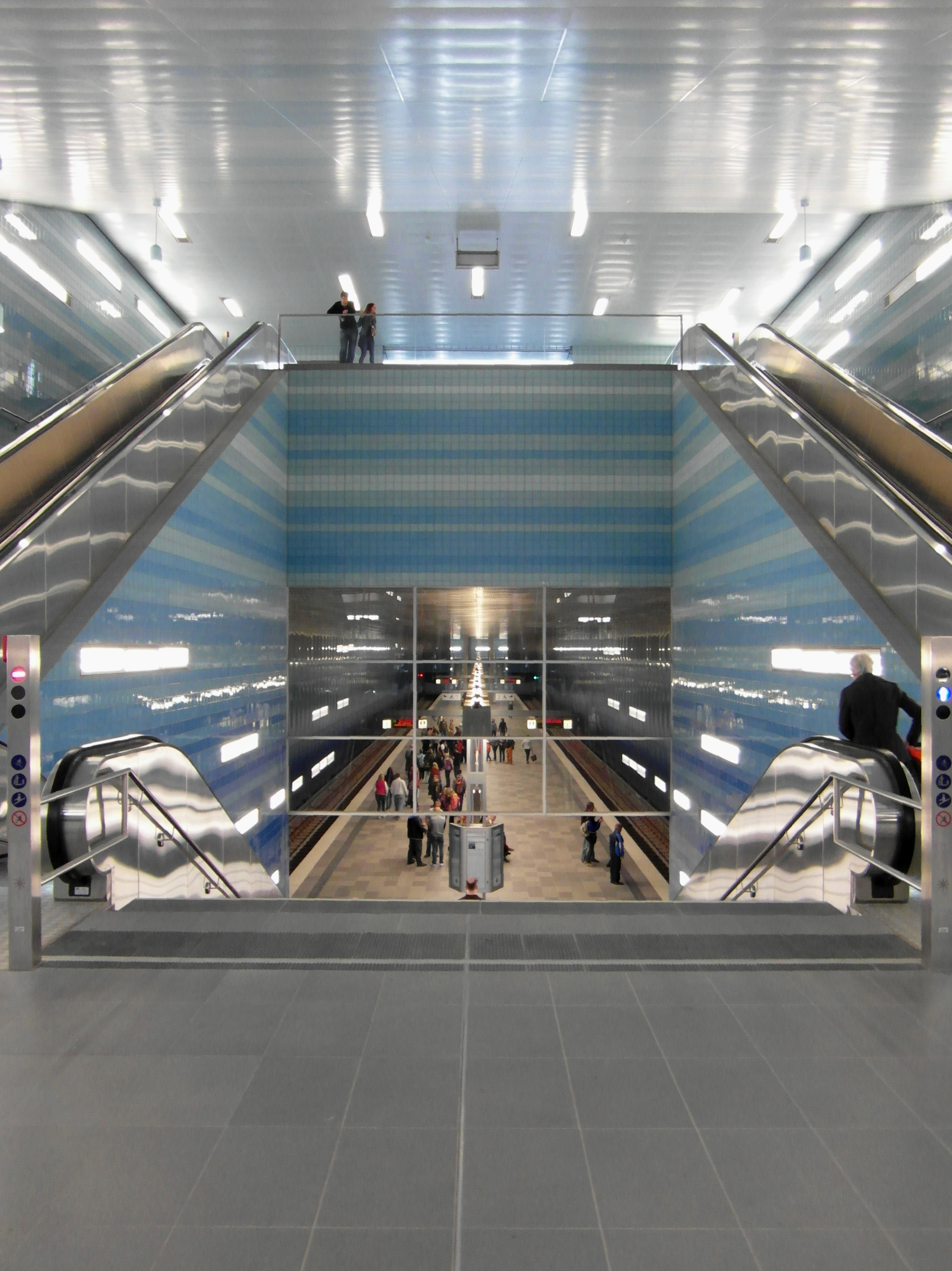

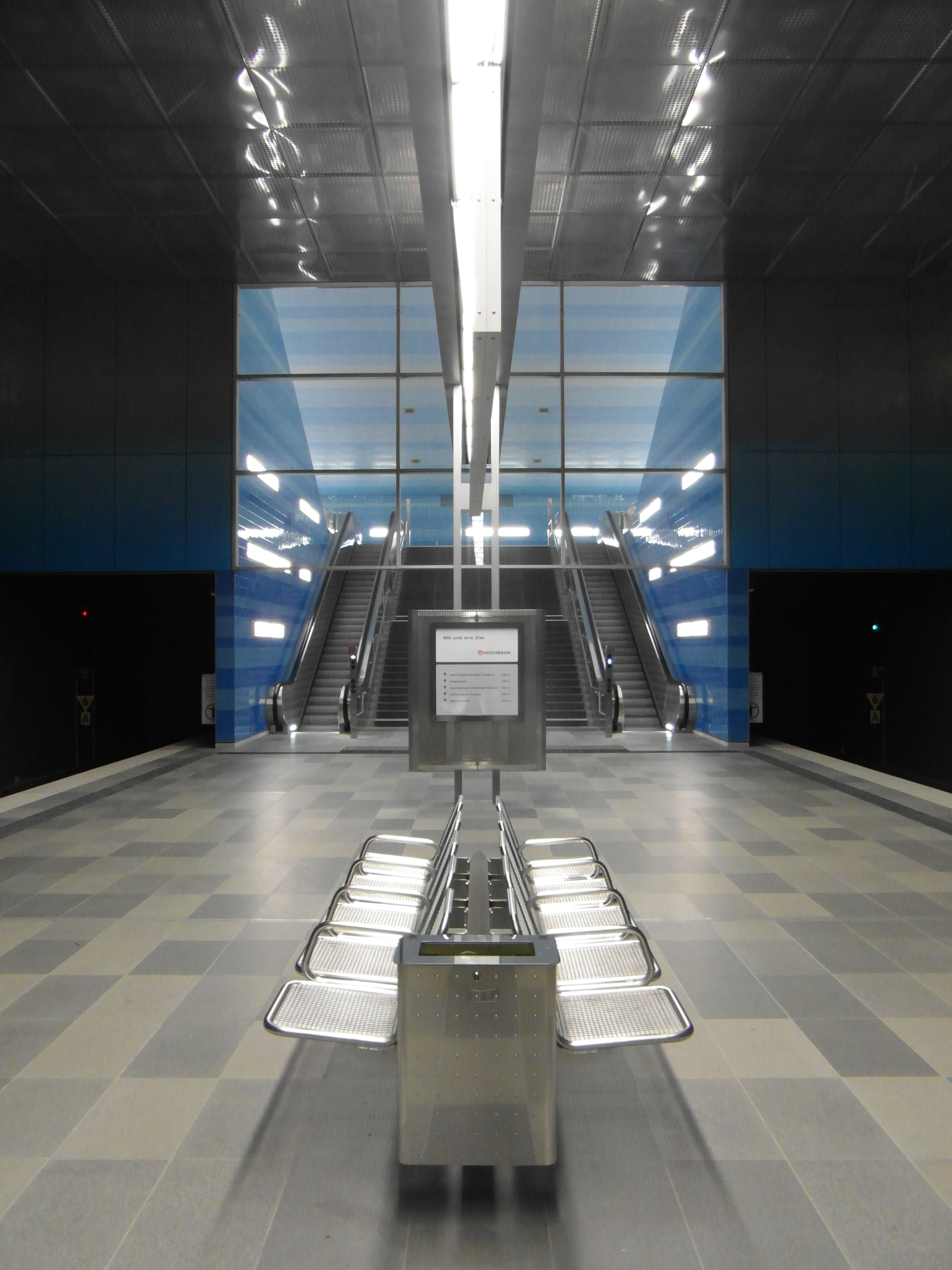

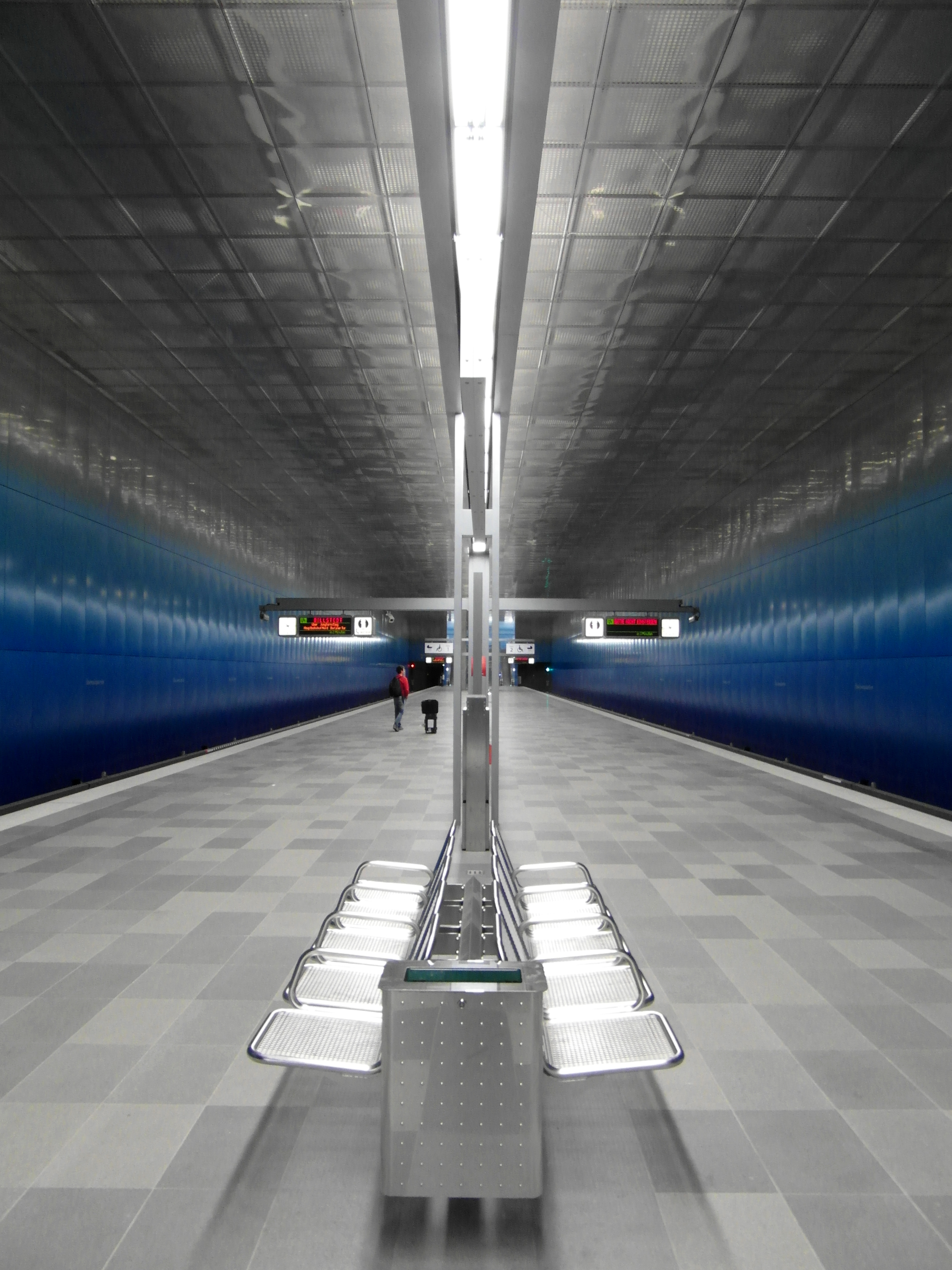

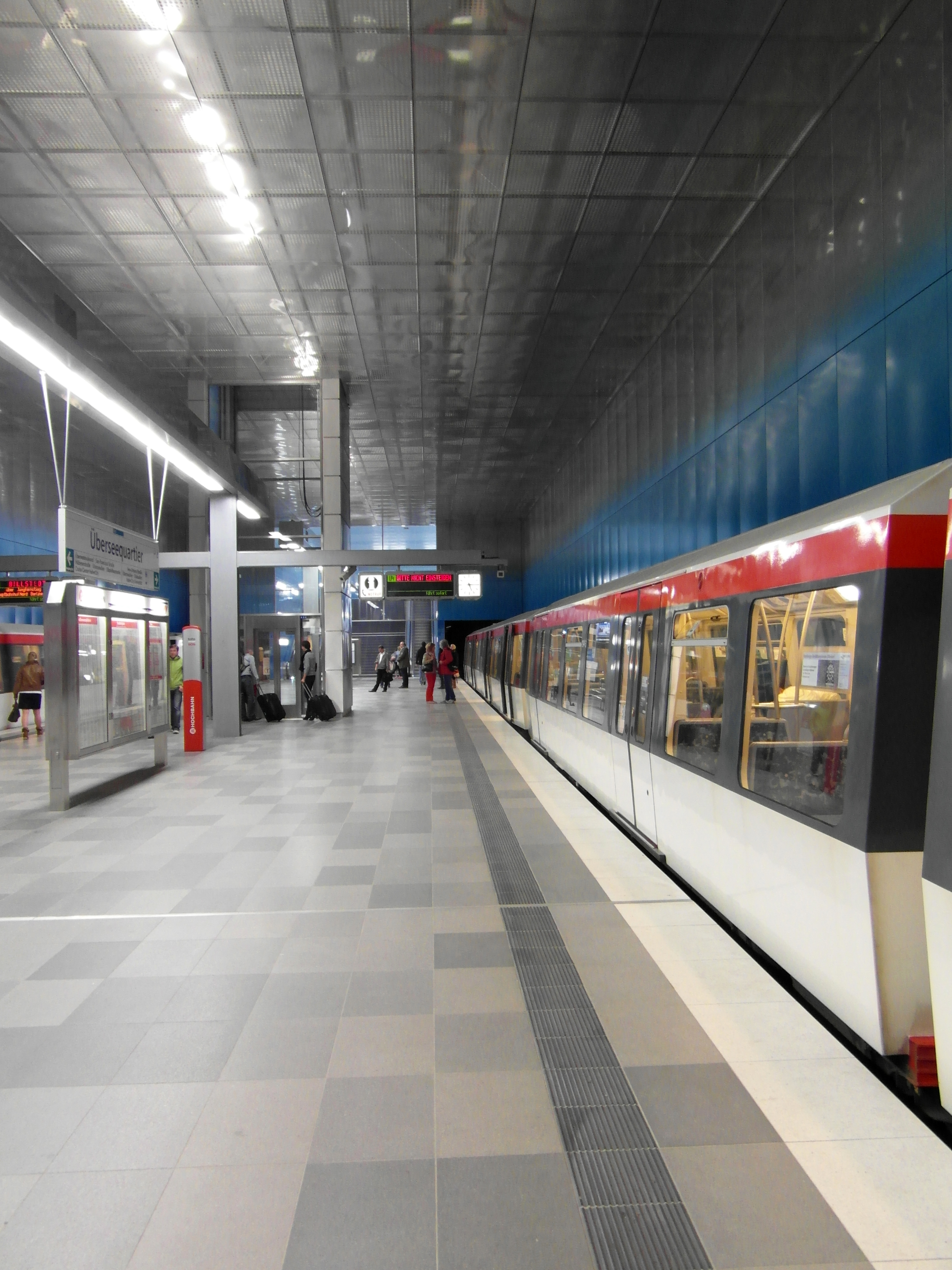

== See also ==
- List of Hamburg U-Bahn stations
