= HafenCity Universität station =

Metro station in Hamburg, Germany

HafenCity Universität
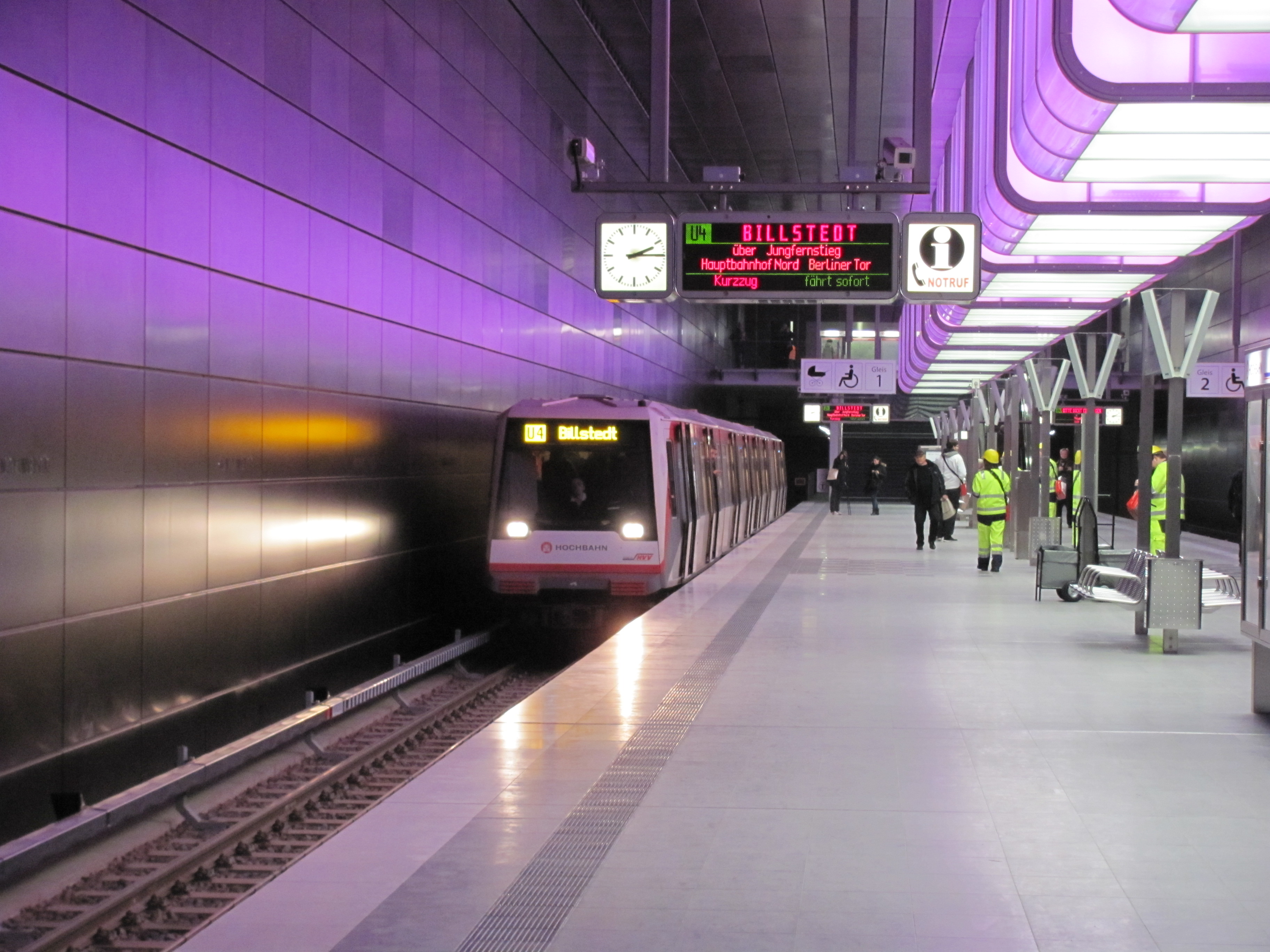

General information
- Location: Überseeallee; 20457 Hamburg, Germany
- Coordinates: 53°32′26″N 10°00′31″E
- System: Hamburg U-Bahn station
- Operator: Hamburger Hochbahn AG
- Line: U4
- Platforms: 1 island platform
- Tracks: 2

Construction
- Structure type: Underground
- Accessible: Yes

Other information
- Station code: HHA: HC
- Fare zone: HVV: A/000

History
- Opened: 29 November 2012

Services
Preceding station	Hamburg U-Bahn	Following station
Elbbrücken Terminus	U4	Überseequartier towards Billstedt
Location
- Location within Hamburg Location within Schleswig-Holstein Location within Germany Location within Europe

HafenCity Universität (German pronunciation: [ˈhaːfn̩ˌsɪti univɛʁziˈtɛːt]) is a rapid transit station on line U4 of the Hamburg U-Bahn network in the district of HafenCity in central Hamburg, Germany. The station is named after the nearby HafenCity University.

== History ==
The station was designed by Munich-based architecture firm Raupach Architekten. The design makes reference to the changing colors typical to the HafenCity, caused by reflections throughout the day by the wharf buildings' red brick and the ship hulls' iron and steel.

Groundbreaking on the branch of the U2 from Jungfernstieg to HafenCity, now known as the U4, took place on 23 August 2007, with construction beginning in February 2008. The station structure was completed on 11 May 2010 and interior work took place until its opening on 29 November 2012. Until 10 August 2013, HafenCity Universität station was open only on weekends and public holidays; since then it is served regularly.

HafenCity Universität served as the terminus station of line U4 from its opening until the U4 was extended one station further eastwards to Elbbrücken on 7 December 2018.

== Service ==
=== Trains ===
HafenCity Universität is served by Hamburg U-Bahn line U4; departures are every 10 minutes.

== Gallery ==
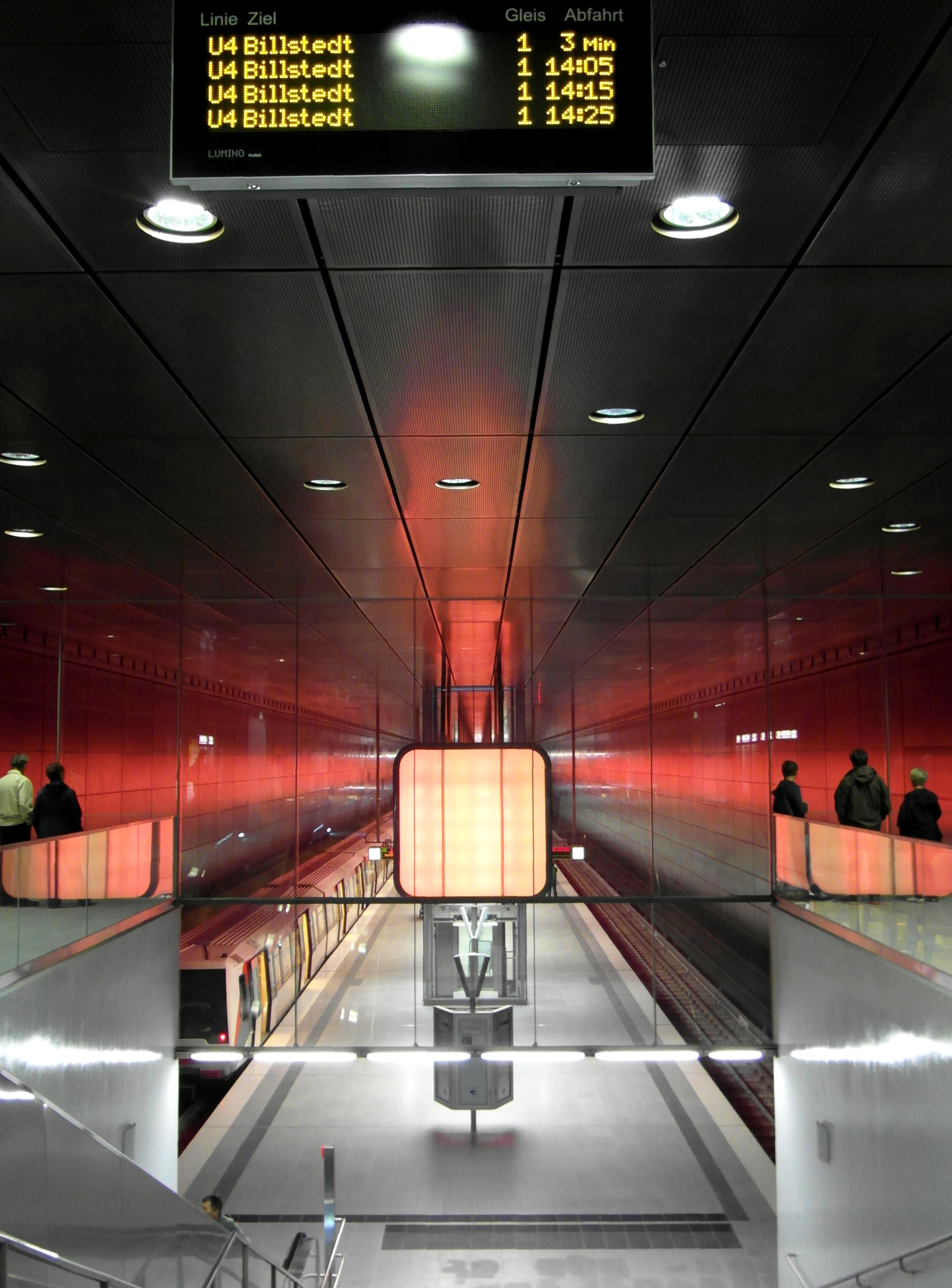
The station's intermediate level
Various illuminations of the station

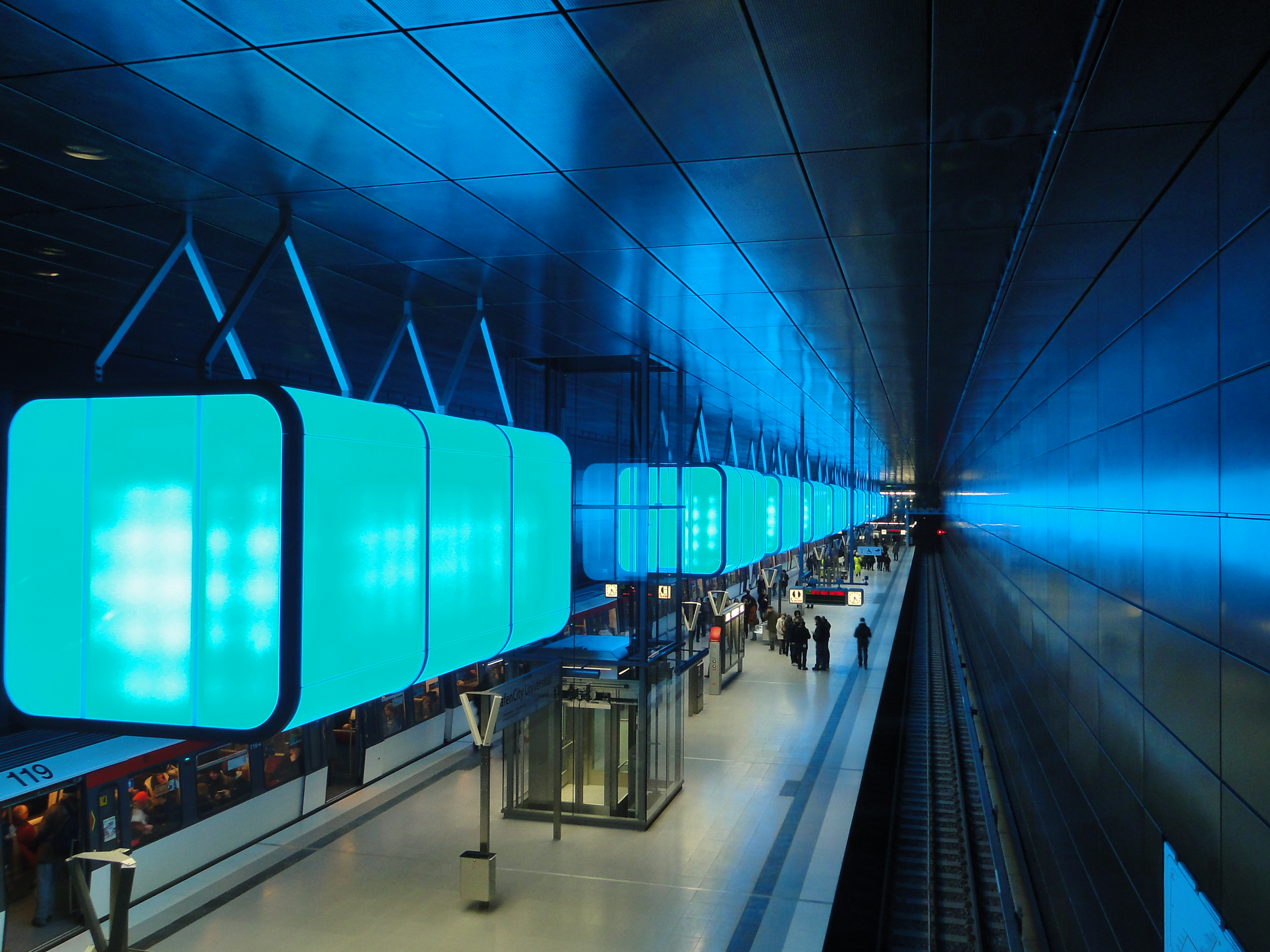

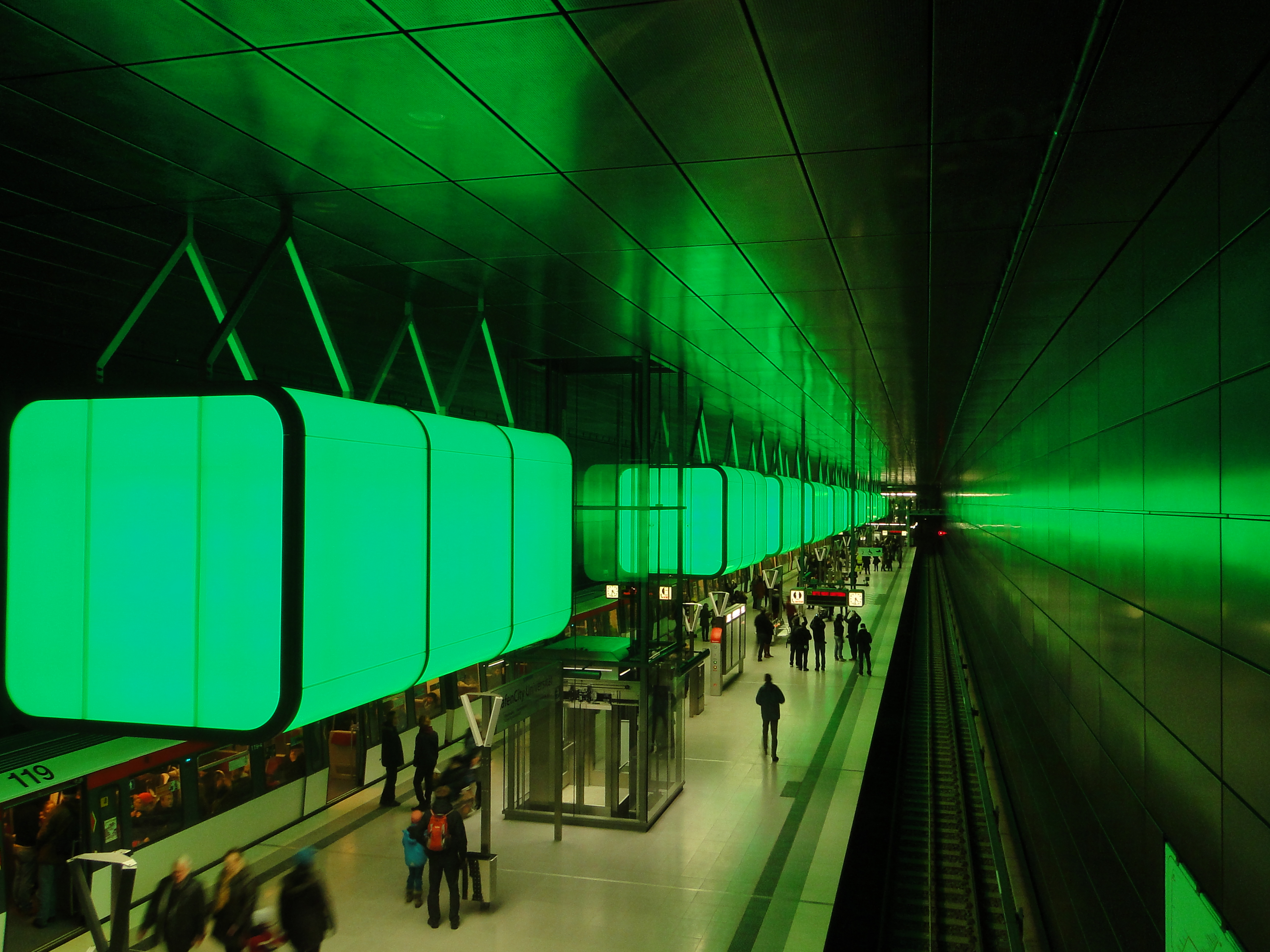

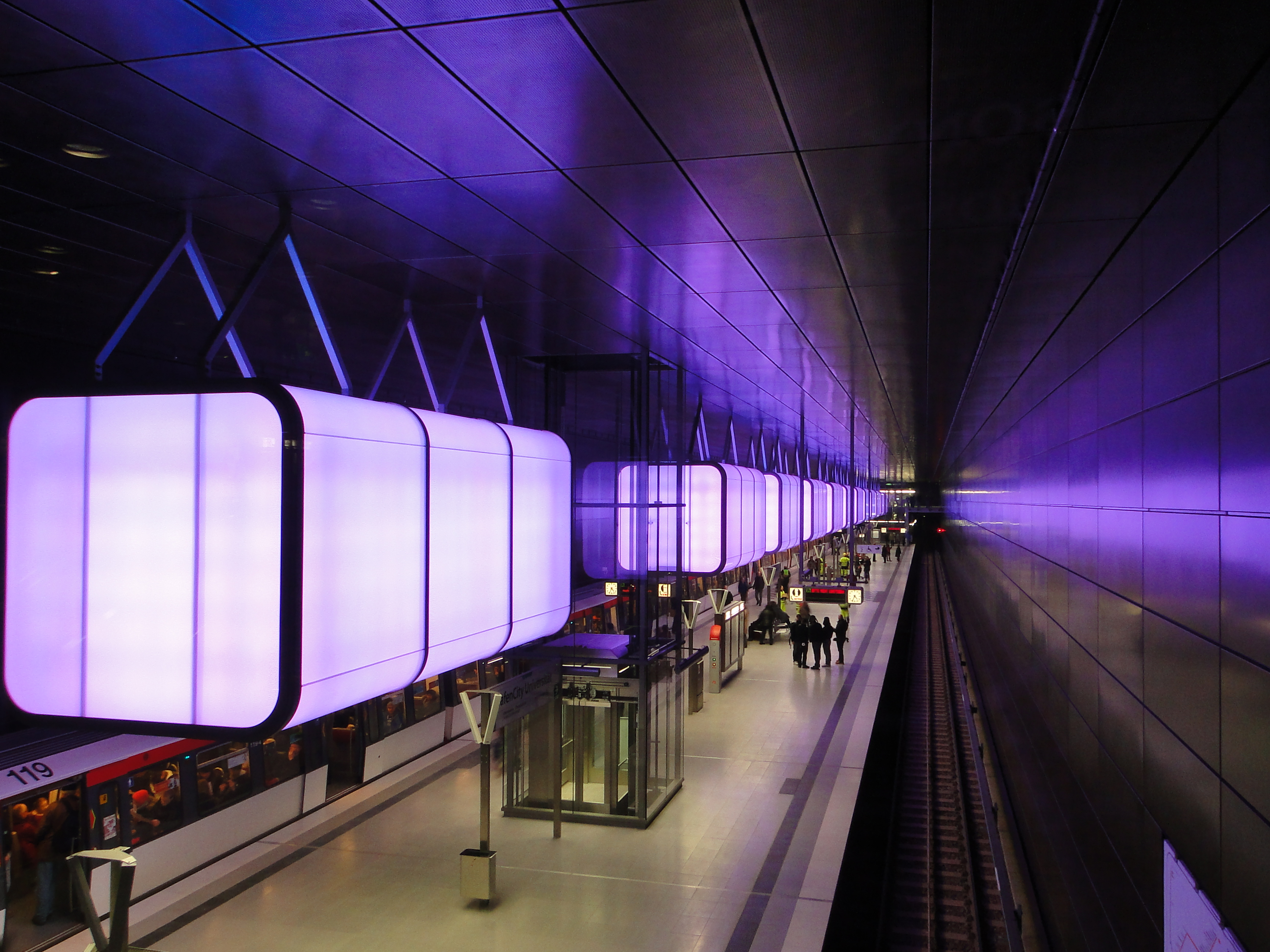

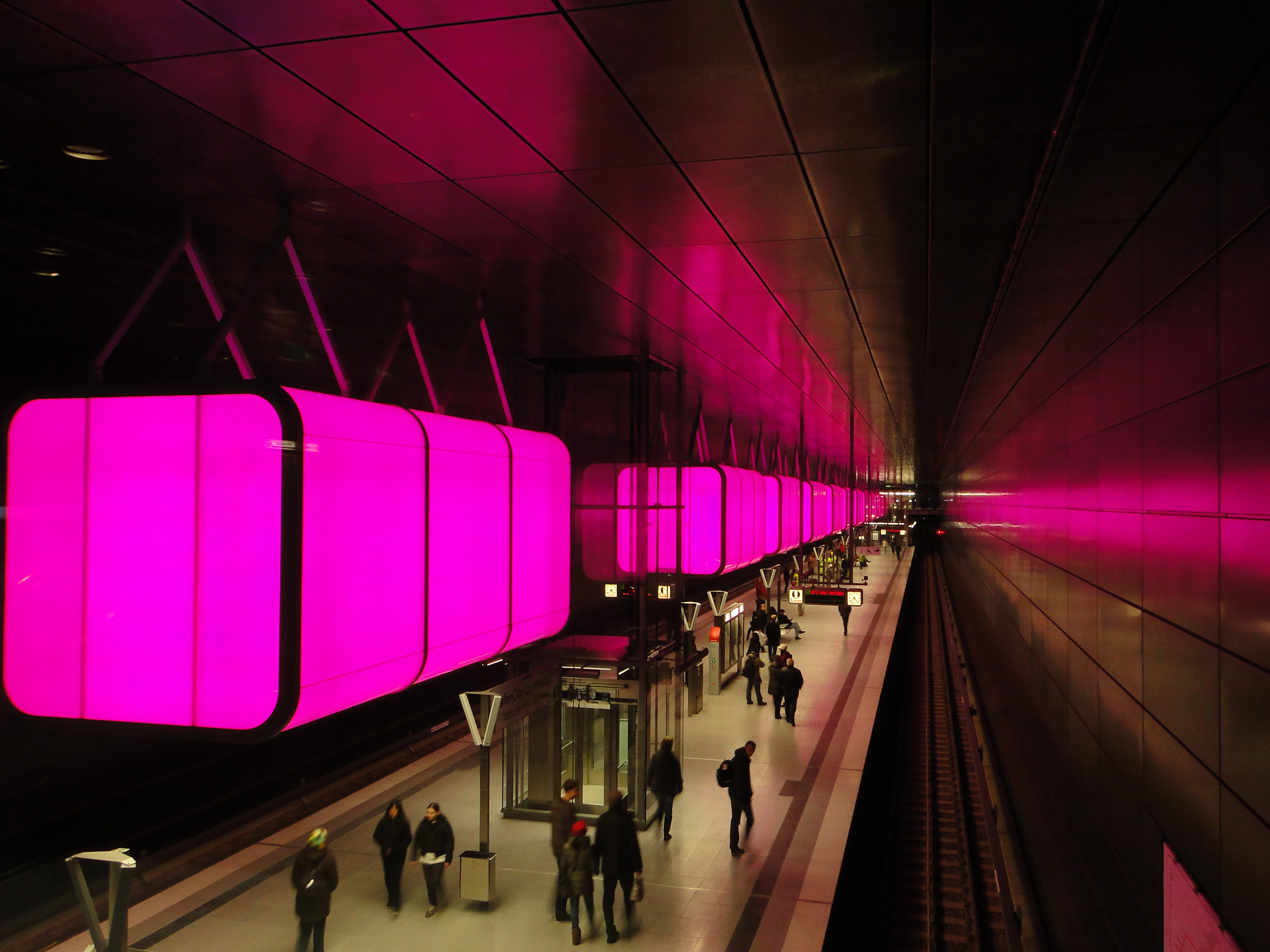

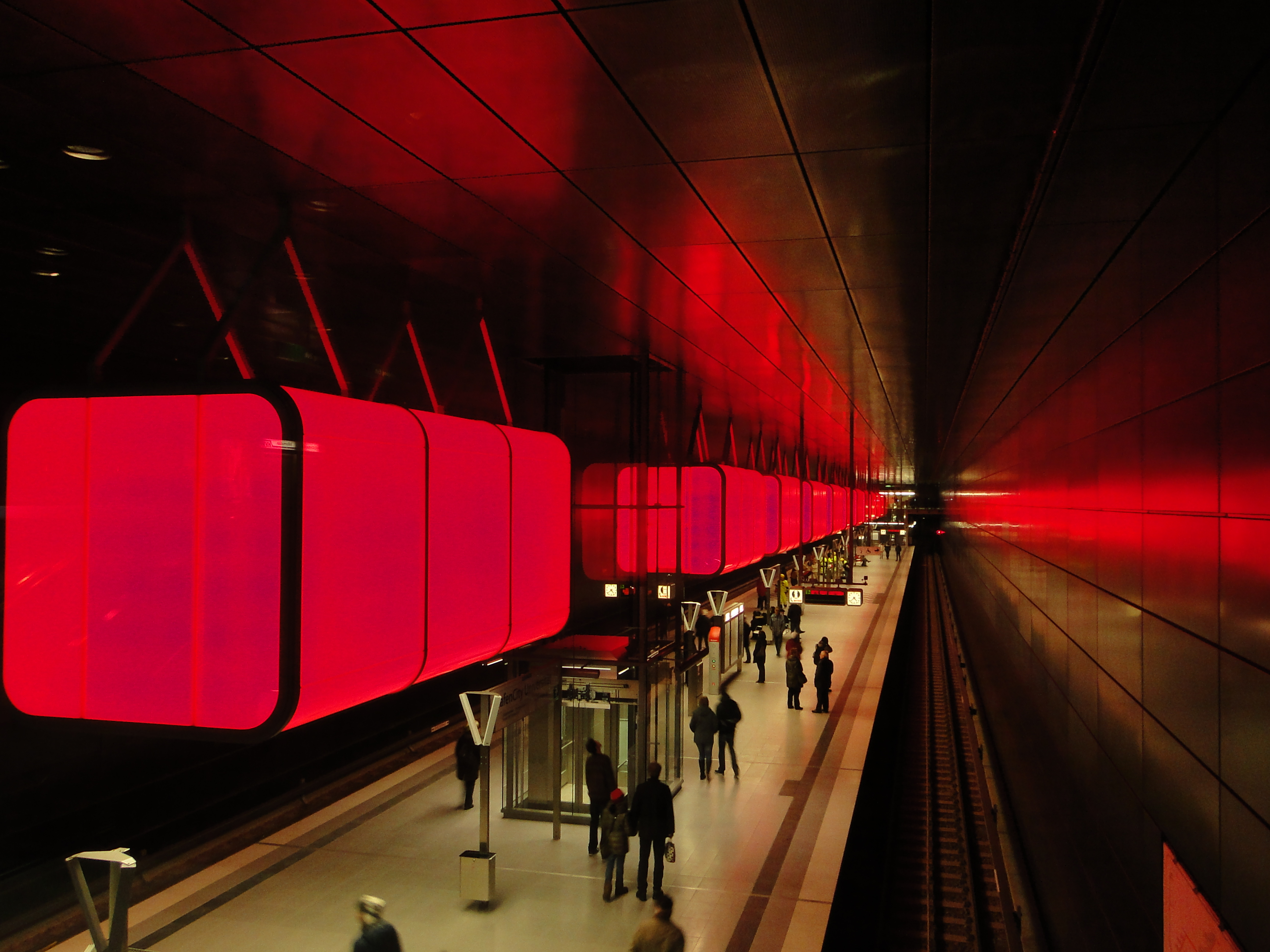

== See also ==
- List of Hamburg U-Bahn stations
