= Wilhelmsburg station =

Railway station in Hamburg, Germany

Wilhelmsburg
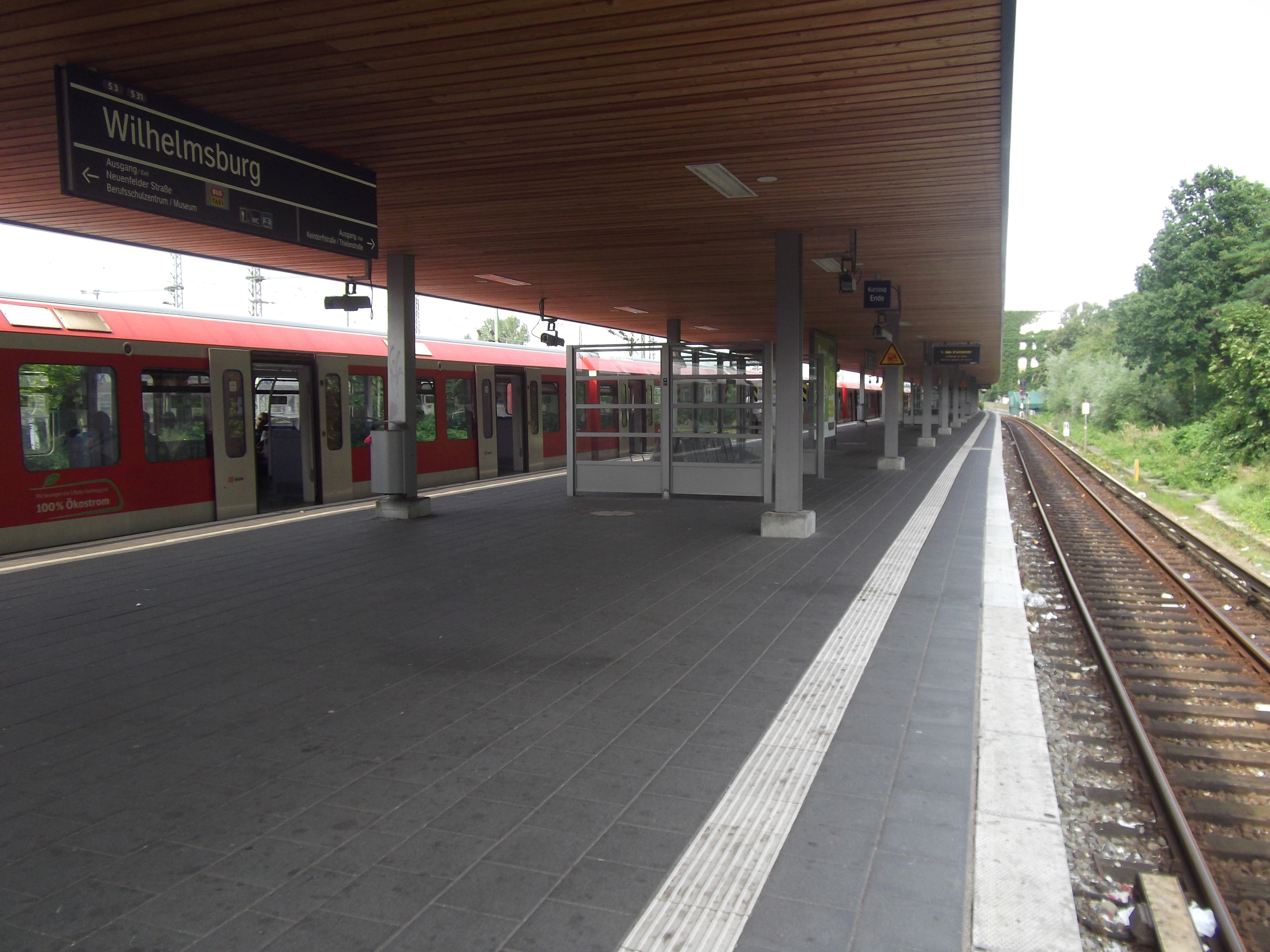

General information
- Other names: Hamburg-Wilhelmsburg
- Location: Wilhelm-Strauss-Weg; 22109 Hamburg; Germany
- Coordinates: 53°29′56″N 10°0′25″E
- Owner: DB Station&Service
- Line: S3 S5
- Platforms: 1 island platform
- Tracks: 2
- Connections: Bus

Construction
- Structure type: Terrain cutting
- Parking: Park and ride (186 slots)
- Cycle facilities: StadtRad
- Accessible: Yes

Other information
- Station code: ds100: AWFS; DB station code: 2523; Type: Bf Category: 4
- Fare zone: HVV: A/108 and 208

History
- Opened: 1 December 1872; 153 years ago
- Rebuilt: 1983, 2013
- Electrified: main line 6 April 1965; 61 years ago, 15 kV AC system (overhead); 23 September 1983; 42 years ago, 1200 V DC system (3rd rail)
- Former names: 1872-1930 Wilhelmsburg; 1930-38 Harburg-Wilhelmsburg Nord; 1938 to date Hamburg-Wilhelmsburg

Services
Preceding station	Hamburg S-Bahn	Following station
Veddel towards Pinneberg	S3	Hamburg-Harburg towards Hamburg-Neugraben
Veddel towards Elbgaustraße	S5	Hamburg-Harburg towards Stade
Location
- Location within Hamburg Location within Schleswig-Holstein Location within Germany Location within Europe

Wilhelmsburg station is a rapid transit station on the Harburg S-Bahn line and is served by trains on the Hamburg S-Bahn network. The railway station is located in the quarter Wilhelmsburg in the Hamburg-Mitte borough of the Free and Hanseatic City of Hamburg, Germany.

Wilhelmsburg station is listed as a Bf (Bahnhof) (rail station), a place where trains may start, end or change directions, and that has at least one set of points. The station is managed by DB Station&Service, a subsidiary of German railway company Deutsche Bahn AG.

== History ==
The Cöln-Mindener Eisenbahn started its service on the Rollbahn line on December 1, 1872. In 1983 — after 10 years of construction, the first part of Hamburg's southern S-Bahn line from Central Station toward Harburg were completed and opened with the new Wilhelmsburg station.

In connection with Hamburg IBA 2013 (Internationale Bauausstellung), the station was substantially renovated, with a new bridge, entrance and platform roof.

== Layout ==
The station is fully accessible for handicapped persons, because the highest step is 5 centimetres (2.0 in). It has exits on both ends of the island platform and a flat roof.

== Services ==
=== Trains ===
S3 and S5 line rapid transit trains call at the station. The trains run through central Hamburg and on to the towns of Pinneberg and Stade.

=== Facilities at the station ===
There are no lockers and the station is unstaffed, but there are SOS and information telephones, ticket machines, toilets and a small shop.

== Gallery ==
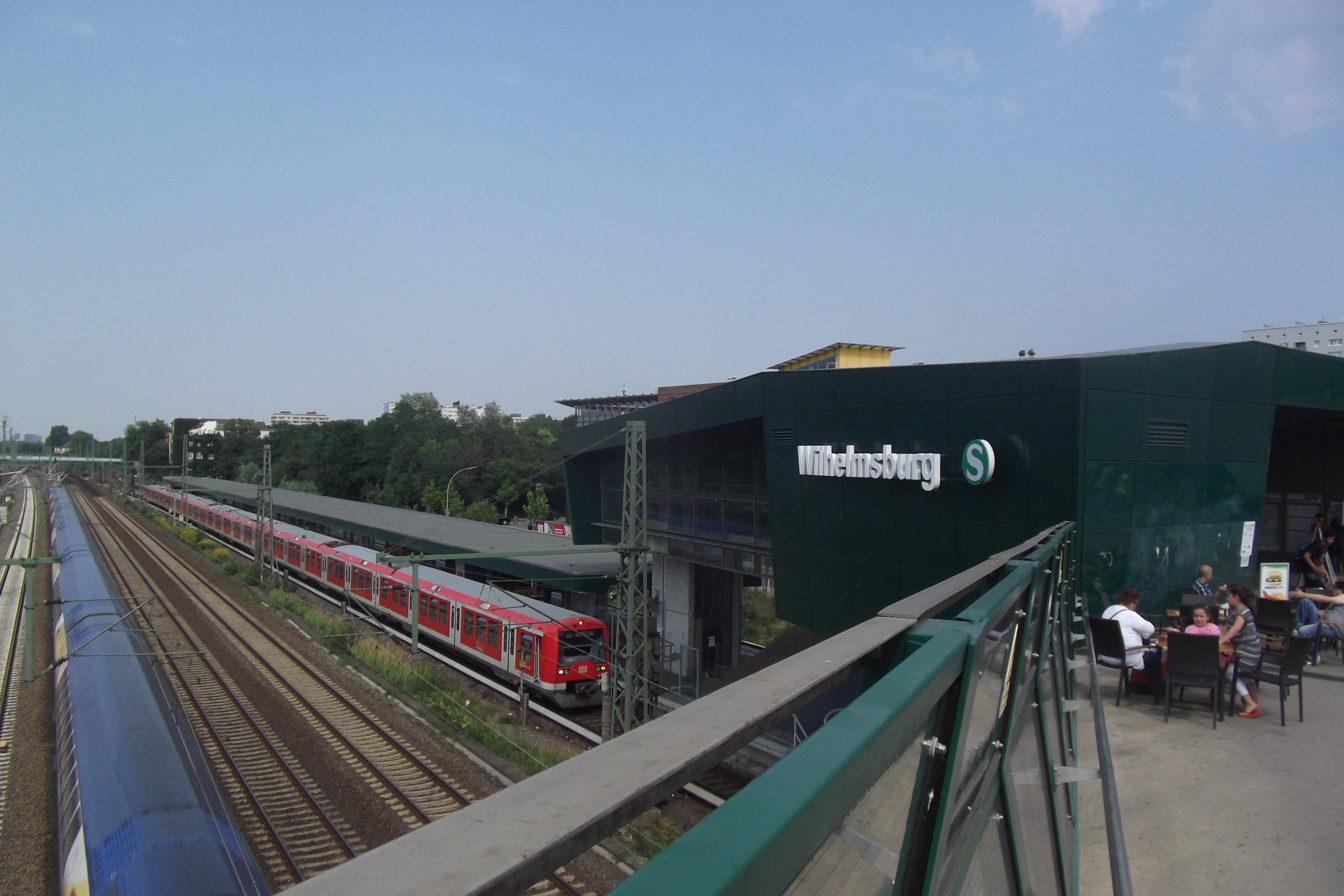
Platform of the station, viewed from the pedestrian bridge

== See also ==
- Hamburger Verkehrsverbund (HVV)
- List of Hamburg S-Bahn stations
