= Hammerbrook station =

Elevated railway station in Germany

Hammerbrook
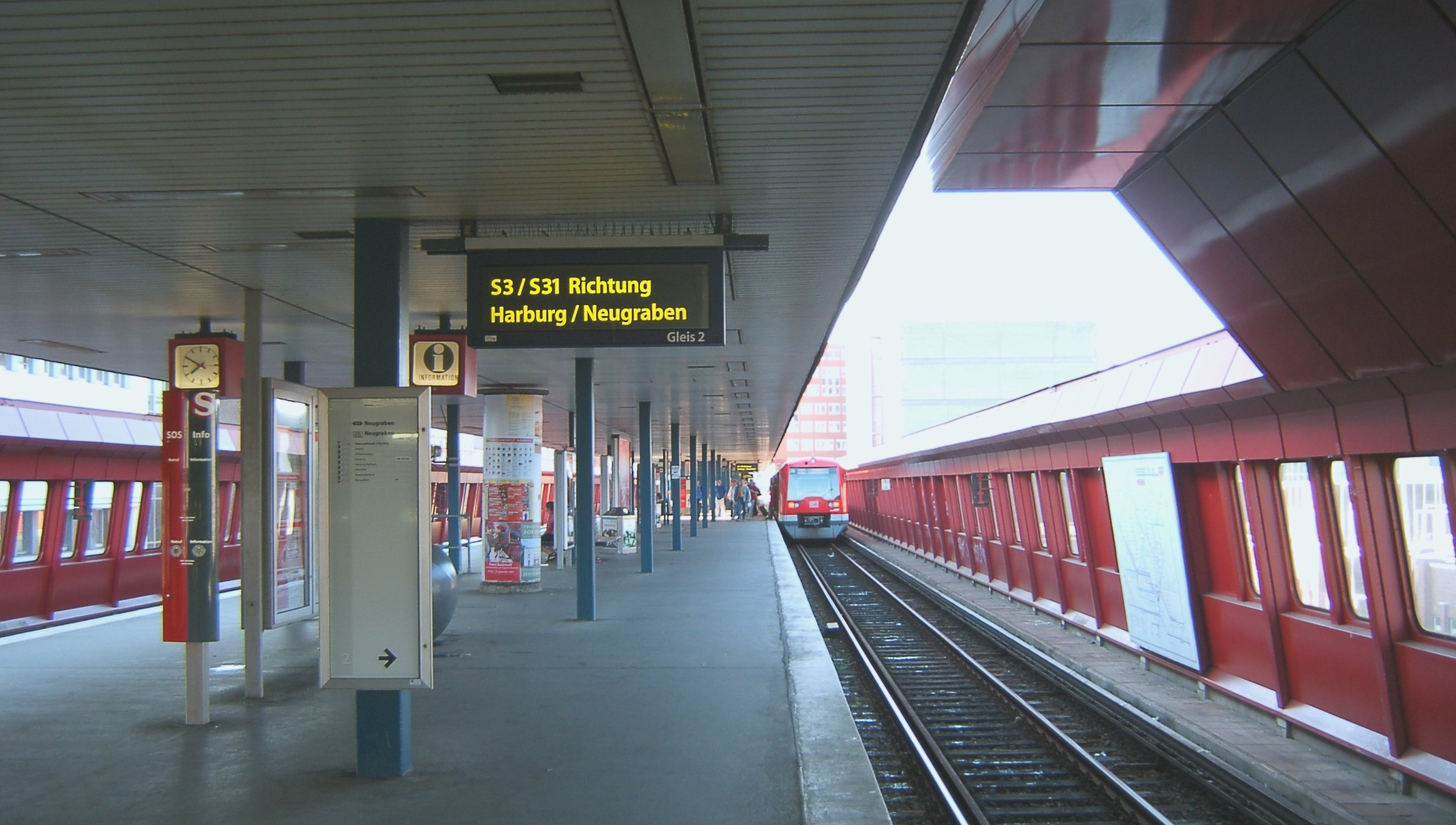
- Platform of the Hammerbrook S-Bahn station

General information
- Location: Hammerbrookstraße; 20097 Hamburg; Germany
- Coordinates: 53°32′47″N 10°1′25″E
- Owner: DB Station&Service
- Line: S3 S5
- Platforms: 1 island platform
- Tracks: 2 side tracks

Construction
- Structure type: Elevated
- Accessible: Yes

Other information
- Station code: ds100:AHAB; DB station code: 2533; Type: Bft Category: 4
- Fare zone: HVV: A/000

History
- Opened: 23 September 1983; 42 years ago
- Electrified: at opening

Services
Preceding station	Hamburg S-Bahn	Following station
Hamburg Hbf towards Pinneberg	S3	Elbbrücken towards Hamburg-Neugraben
Hamburg Hbf towards Elbgaustraße	S5	Elbbrücken towards Stade
Location
- Location within Hamburg Location within Schleswig-Holstein Location within Germany Location within Europe

Hammerbrook is an elevated railway station on the Harburg S-Bahn line, served by the city trains of Hamburg S-Bahn. The railway station is located in Hammerbrook, Hamburg-Mitte, Hamburg, Germany.

== History ==
The station was opened on 23 September 1983 to connect Harburg and other districts South of the Elbe River − home of more than half a million people − with Hamburg's inner city. Since then, and also thanks to the station, Hammerbrook developed into a commercial district: the "City Süd".

== Layout ==
The elevated station consists of an island platform with 2 side tracks. The station is fully accessible for handicapped persons since 2013. There are two entrances to the station on Hammerbrookstraße, one near Mittelkanal, the other near Südkanal.

== Services ==
=== Trains ===
The rapid transit trains of the lines S3 and S5 of the Hamburg S-Bahn call at the station, connecting the town Pinneberg in Schleswig-Holstein and the city of Stade, Lower Saxony, with Hamburg.

=== Facilities ===
No personnel are attending the station, but there are emergency and information telephones, and ticket machines.

== Gallery ==
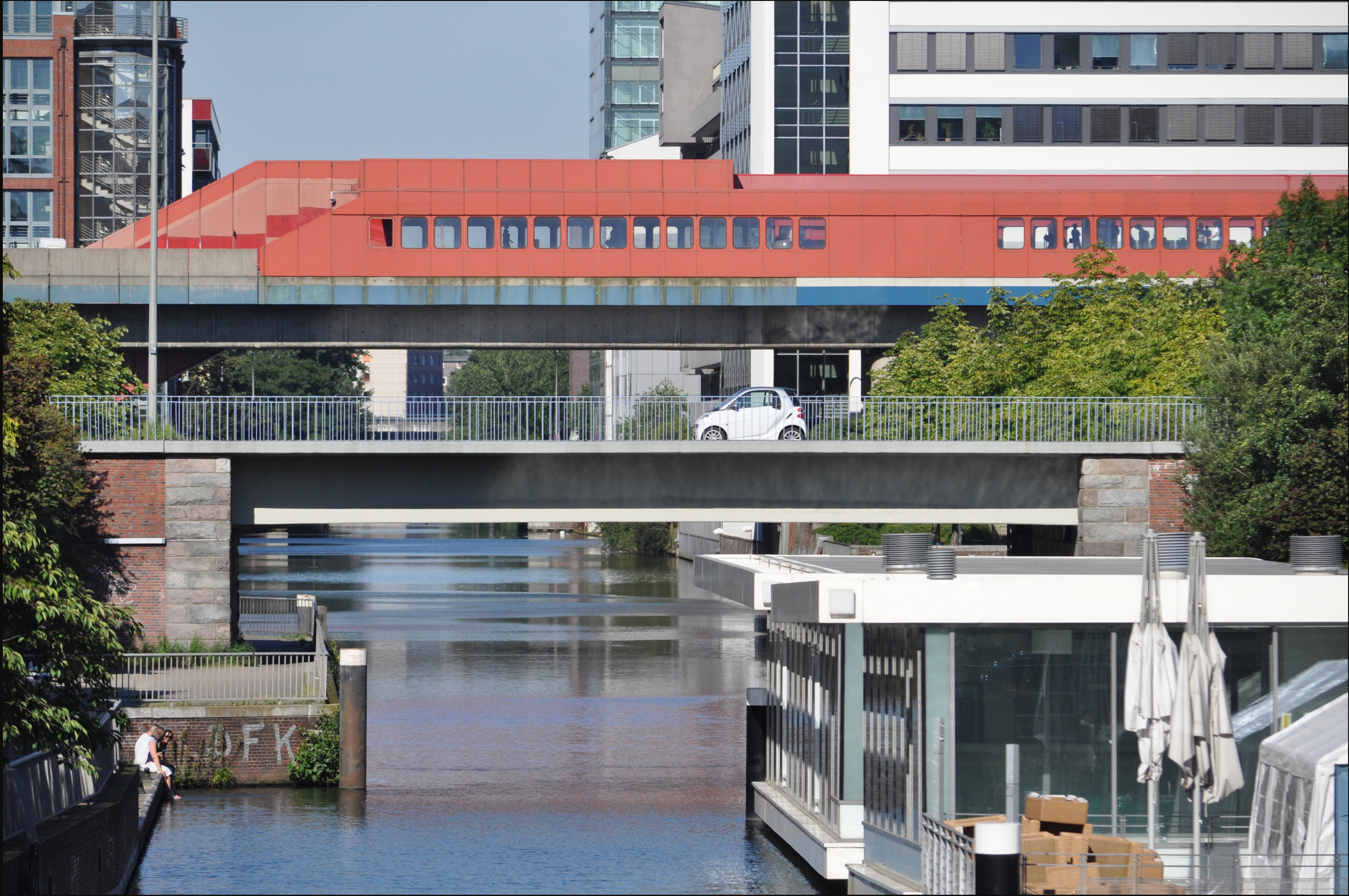
View of the elevated stations above Hammerbrook's Mittelkanal

== See also ==
- List of Hamburg S-Bahn stations
- Hamburger Verkehrsverbund (HVV)
