= Veddel station =

Rapid transit station in Germany

Veddel
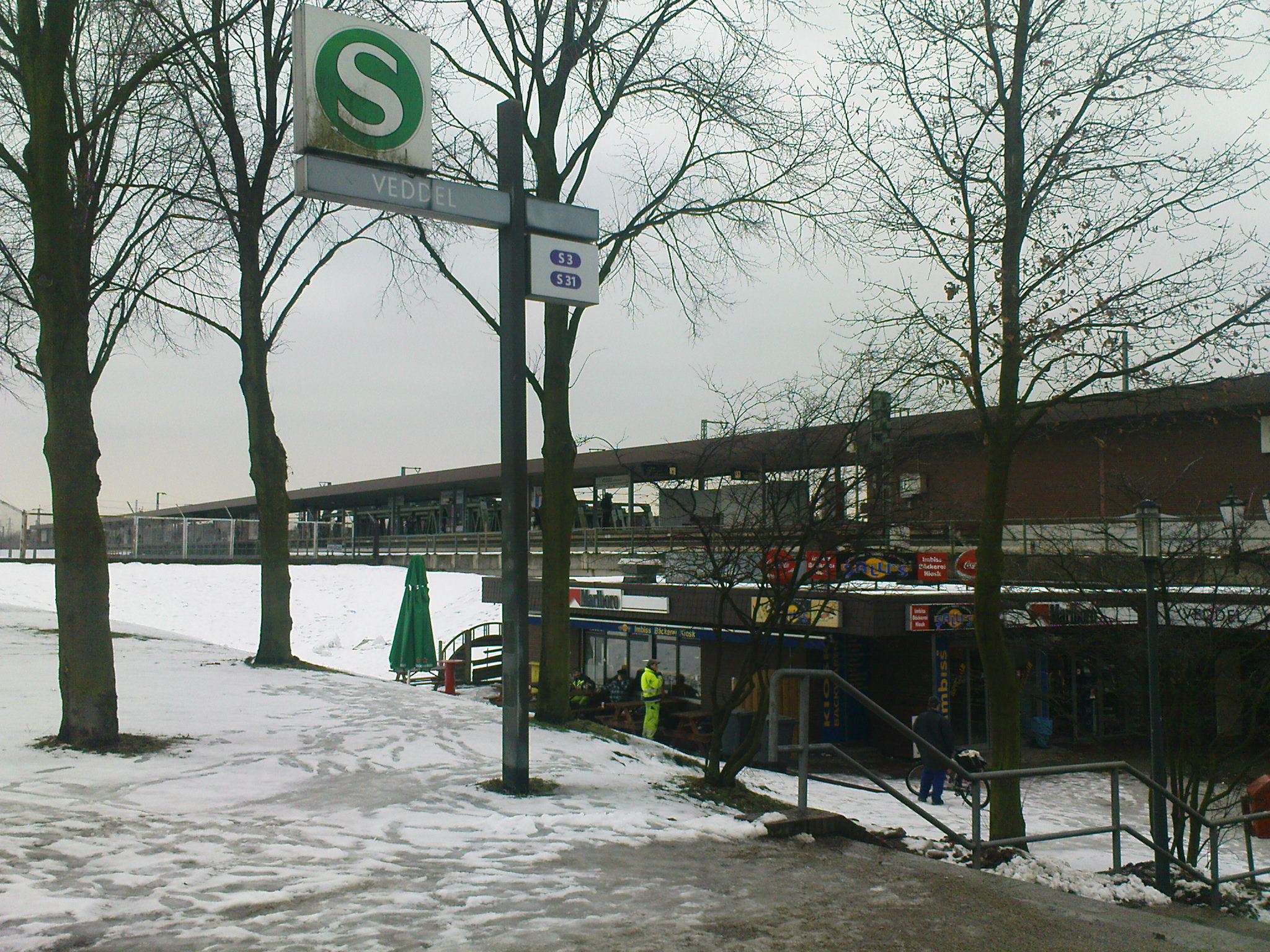
- Entrance to Veddel station in February 2010

General information
- Location: Wilhelmsburger Platz 10; 21109 Hamburg; Germany
- Coordinates: 53°31′18″N 10°0′48″E
- Owner: DB Station&Service
- Line: S3 S5
- Platforms: 1 island platform
- Tracks: 2 side tracks

Construction
- Structure type: At grade
- Parking: Park and ride (677 slots)
- Accessible: Yes

Other information
- Station code: ds100: AVLS; DB station code:6399 Type: Hp Category: 4
- Fare zone: HVV: A/108

History
- Opened: 1 December 1897; 128 years ago
- Rebuilt: 1973–1983
- Electrified: main line 6 April 1965; 61 years ago, 15 kV AC system (overhead); 23 September 1983; 42 years ago, 1200 V DC system (3rd rail)

Services
Preceding station	Hamburg S-Bahn	Following station
Elbbrücken towards Pinneberg	S3	Wilhelmsburg towards Hamburg-Neugraben
Elbbrücken towards Elbgaustraße	S5	Wilhelmsburg towards Stade
Location
- Location within Hamburg Location within Schleswig-Holstein Location within Germany Location within Europe

Veddel (BallinStadt) is a rapid transit station on the Harburg S-Bahn line and served by the trains of Hamburg S-Bahn. The railway station is located in the Veddel, Borough of Hamburg-Mitte, Hamburg, Germany. The station is managed by DB Station&Service, a subsidiary of the German railway company Deutsche Bahn AG. The station is listed as a Halt point (Haltepunkt), a passenger stop situated on an open stretch of line, and lacking specific signals.

== History ==
On 1 December 1897, the Cöln-Mindener Eisenbahn started its service on the Rollbahn line. In 1983 — after 10 years of construction, the first part of Hamburg's southern S-Bahn line from Central Station toward Harburg were completed and opened with the new Veddel station.

== Layout ==
The station is not fully accessible for handicapped persons. Before 1983, the station building was a brick building with an island platform and one entrance. Since the new S-Bahn line, it has exits on both ends of an island platform and a simple flat roof.

== Services ==
=== Trains ===
The rapid transit trains of the lines S3 and S5 of the Hamburg S-Bahn are calling the station.

=== Facilities at the station ===
There are no lockboxes and no personnel are attending the station, but there are SOS and information telephones, ticket machines, toilets and a small shop.

== See also ==
- List of Hamburg S-Bahn stations
- Hamburger Verkehrsverbund (HVV)
