= U4 (Hamburg U-Bahn) =

Rapid transit line in Hamburg, Germany

Coordinates: 53.5402°N 9.9932°E

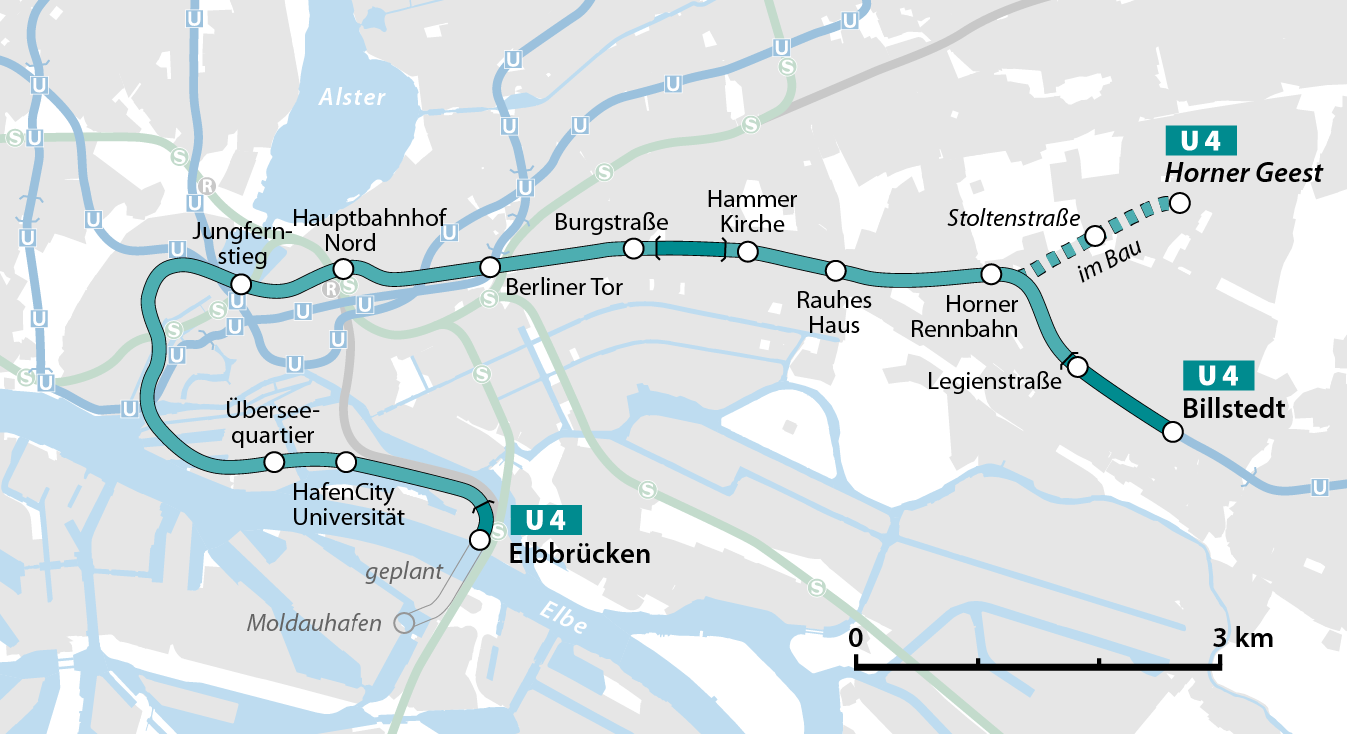

Overview
- Stations: 12

Service
- Type: Rapid transit
- System: Hamburg U-Bahn
- Operator(s): Hamburger Hochbahn

History
- Opened: 2012; 14 years ago

Technical
- Line length: 11.9 km (7.4 mi)
- Track gauge: 4 ft 8 1/2 in (1,435 mm)

The U4 is a line of the Hamburg U-Bahn, which opened in 2012, serving 12 stations. It is the shortest line of the network, with a length of 11.9 kilometres (7.39 mi) and from Jungfernstieg to Billstedt it shares tracks with the U2. Its identifying colour, as seen on route maps, trains, and station signs is turquoise.

== Route ==
The U4 is the newest line of the Hamburg U-Bahn and the first line that is to form as a branch of an older, existing line. It shares the U2's tracks from Billstedt to the major transfer station Jungfernstieg, located in the city center, branching off 165 meters (541 ft) before the station and stopping at the outer tracks of the four-platform station. It then traverses under the Neustadt in a far-swinging 180° bend and reaches the newly built Überseequartier station in HafenCity after about 3 kilometres (1.9 mi). The following station, HafenCity Universität lies about 650 meters (2,130 ft) to the east in the Elbtorquartier. On 7 December 2018 the line was extended 1.3 km (0.81 mi) eastward, to a new terminus at Elbbrücken, allowing for a future S-Bahn connection with lines S3/S5.

The line runs almost entirely underground, only surfacing at Elbbrücken and Billstedt at both ends. There is also a short uncovered section east of Burgstraße.

== Projected extensions ==
=== Eastern extension from Horner Rennbahn to Horner Geest ===
At Horner Rennbahn, the U4 is planned to branch off of the U2 and continue east under the Manshardtstraße. Two new stations are planned along this extension: Stoltenstraße, east of the existing bus stop with the same name, and Horner Geest, west of the bus station with the same name in the area of a local shopping center. Following the two stations, the construction of a two-track storage facility is also planned, which is to be built in such a way as to allow a later extension of the line towards Jenfeld. Overall, the extension to Horner Geest is expected to connect the households of around 13,000 people to the metro network. By 2030, the Hochbahn expects 13,600 daily passengers on the line.

=== Elbbrücken-Moldauhafen ===
An extension of the line from Elbbrücken to the under-construction Moldauhafen station in the Grasbrook district is planned. Construction work will begin in 2027, and the station will open in 2031.

== Gallery ==
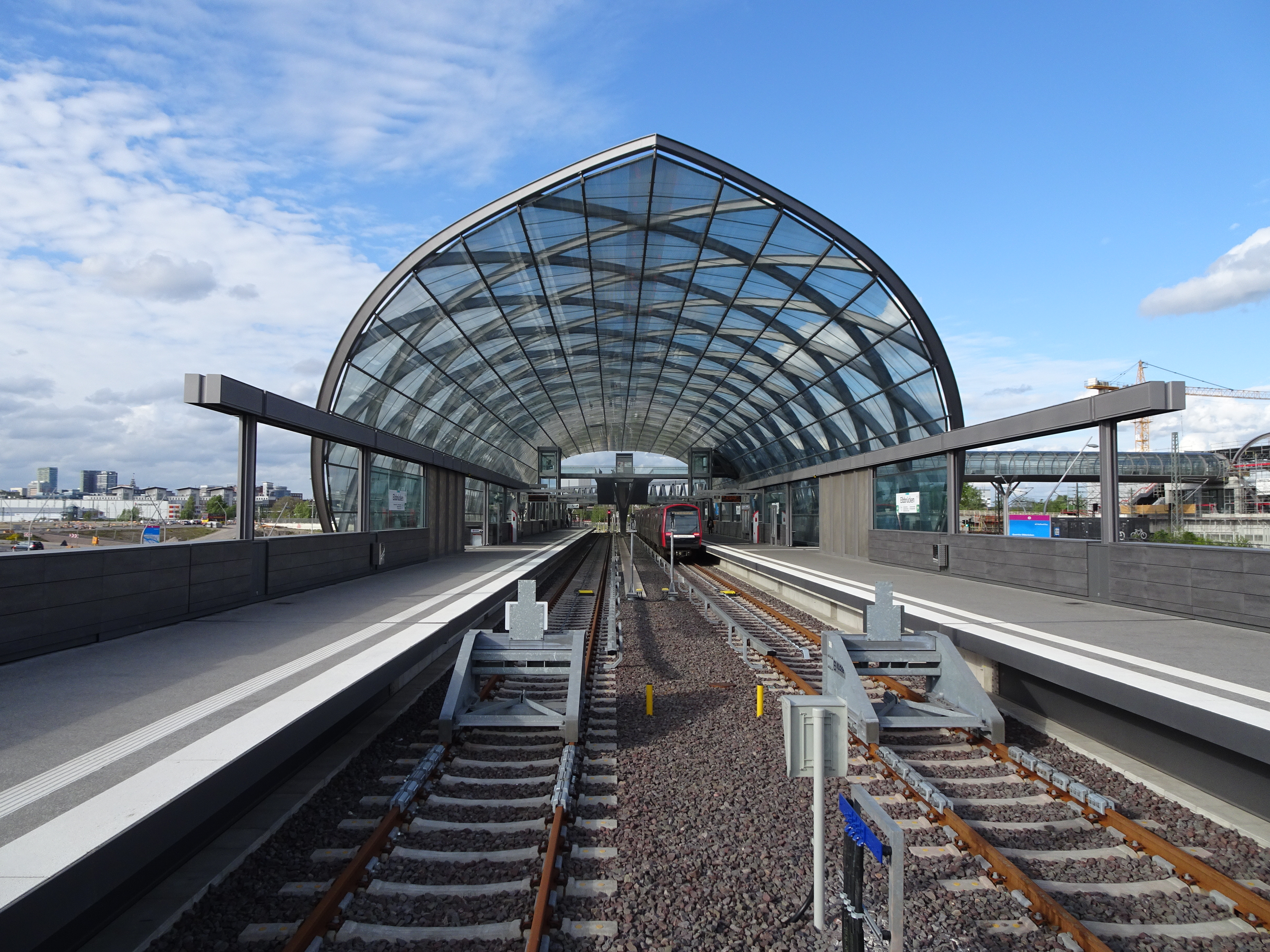
Elbbrücken

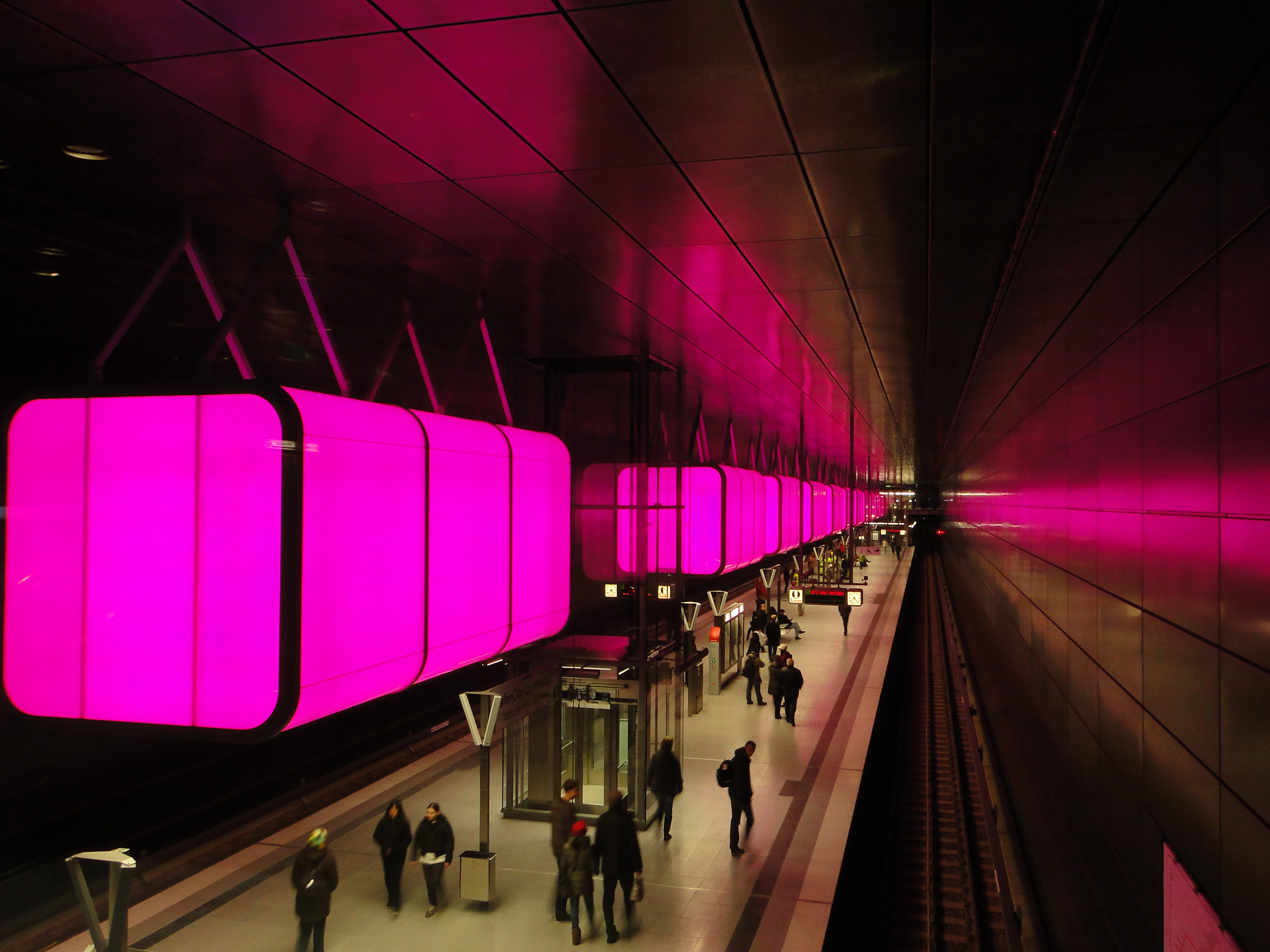
HafenCity Universität

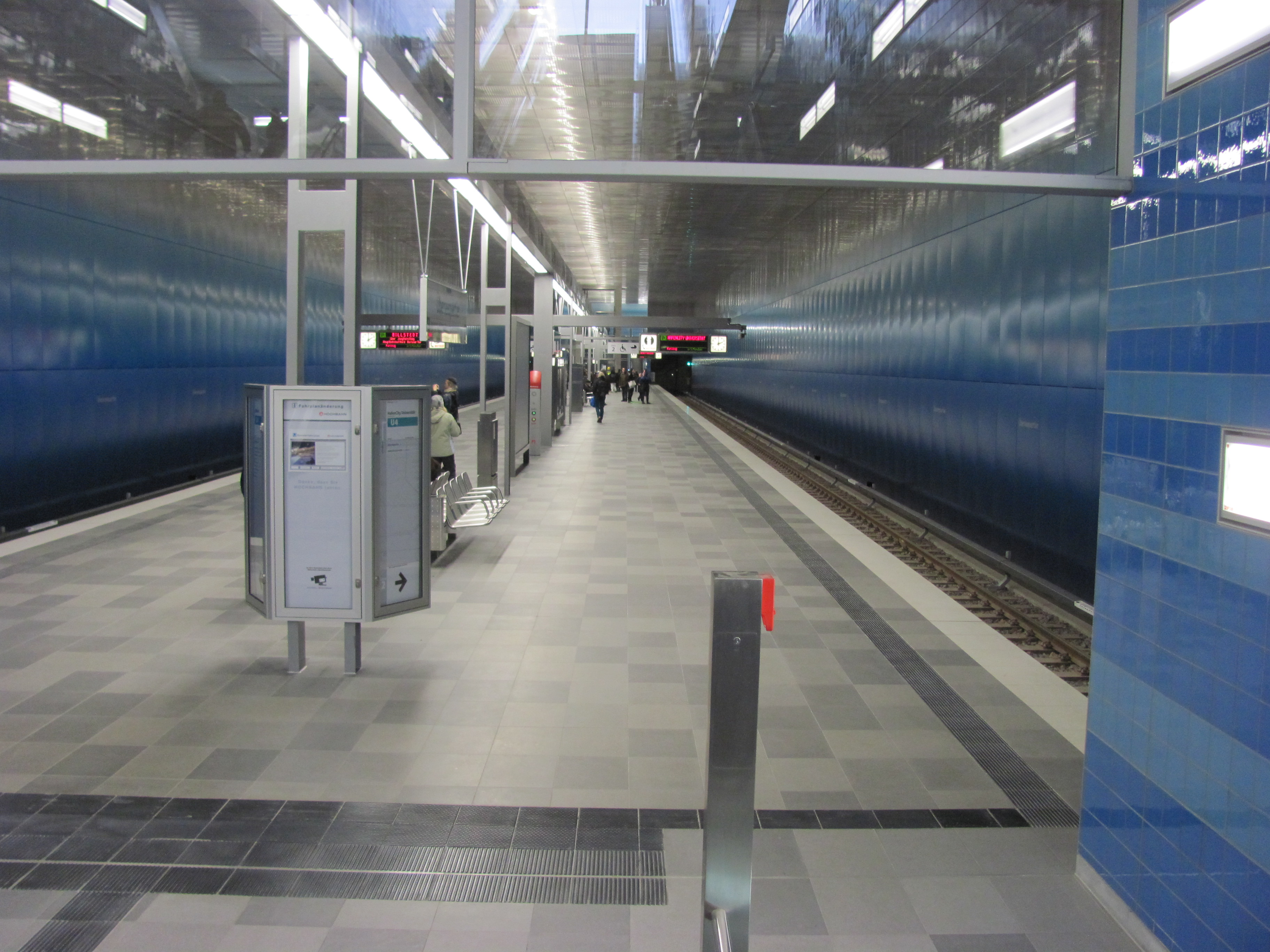
Überseequartier

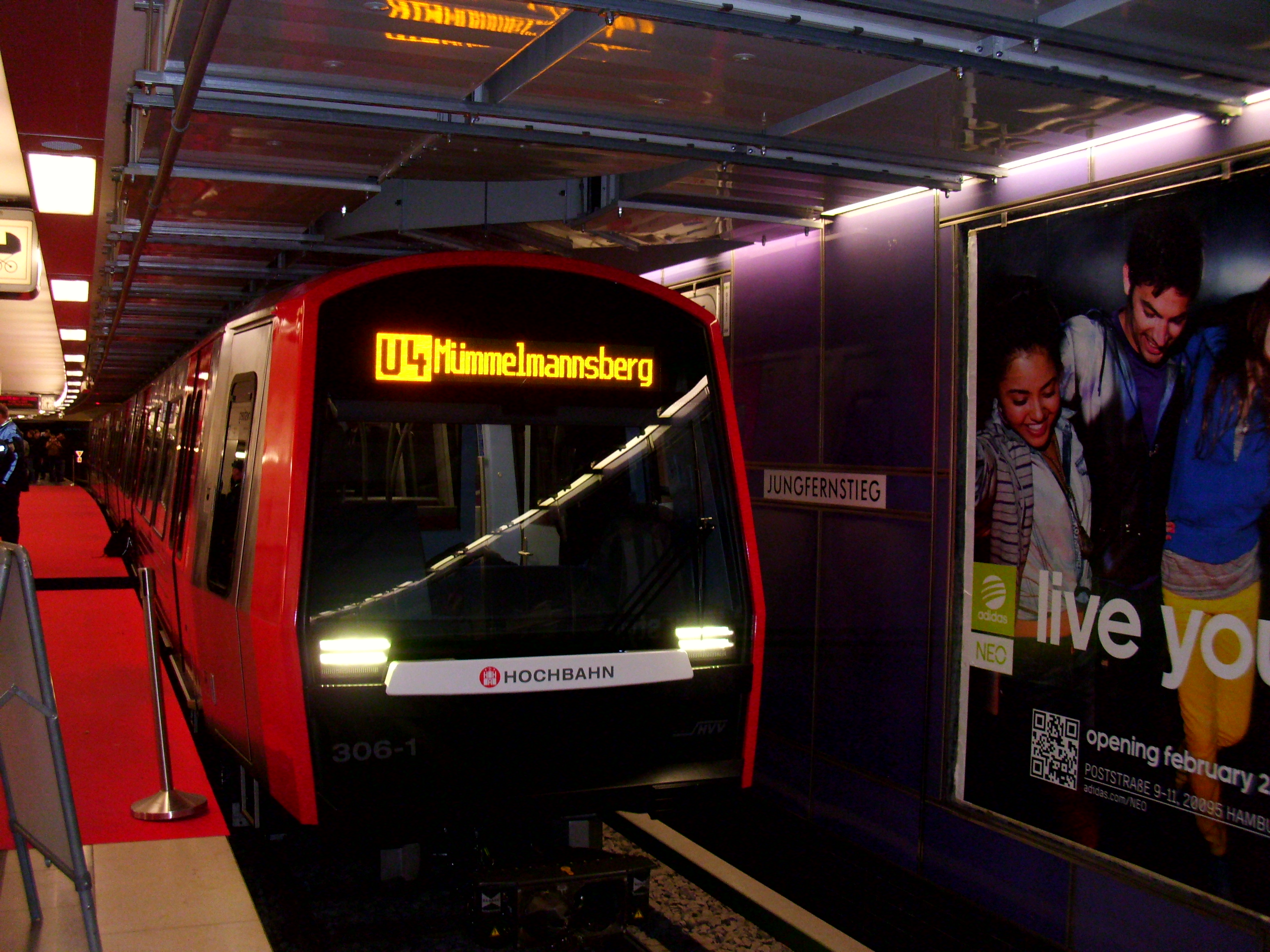
Jungfernstieg

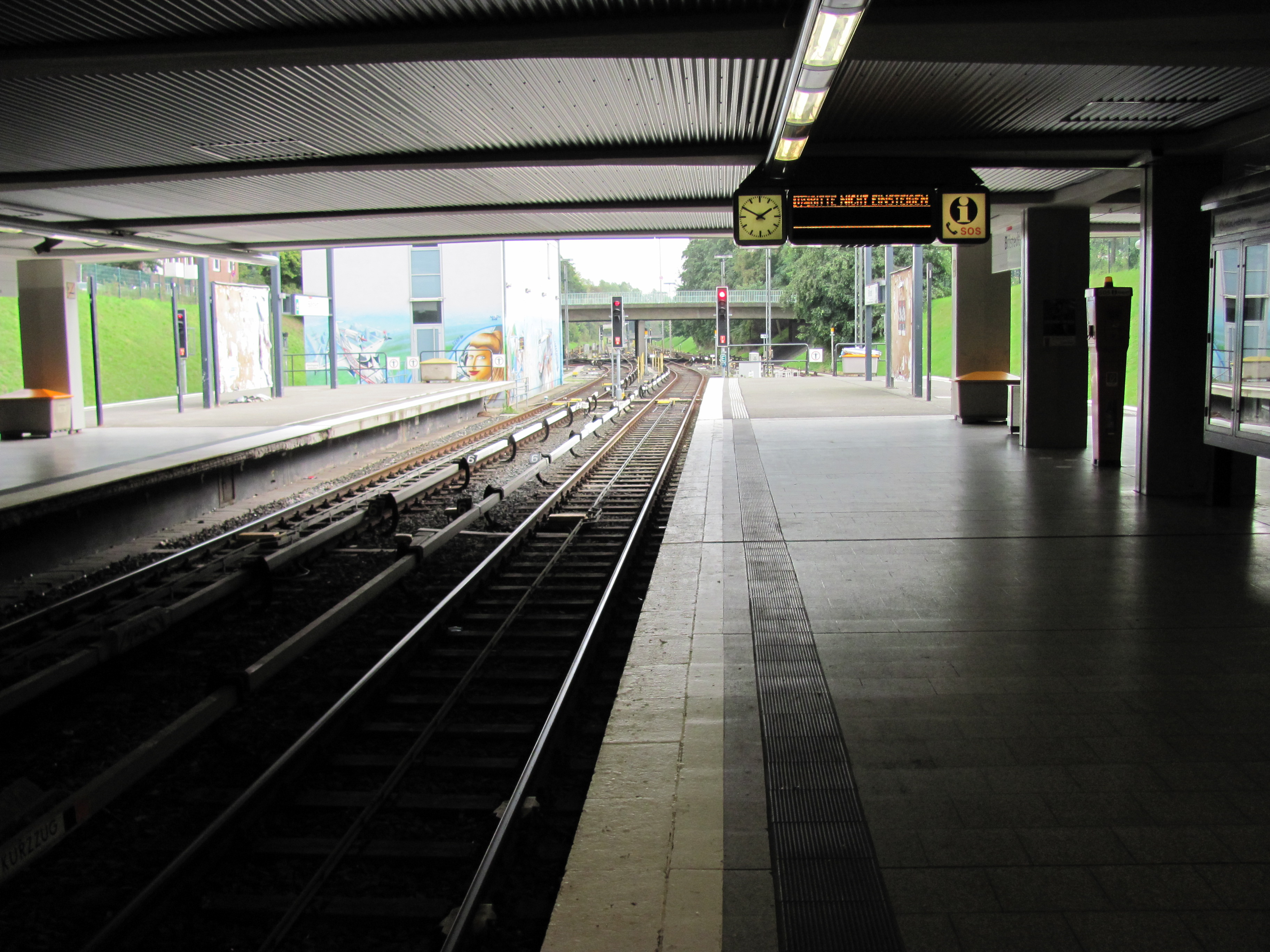
Billstedt (shared with U2)
