= Elbbrücken station =

Railway station in Hamburg, Germany

Elbbrücken
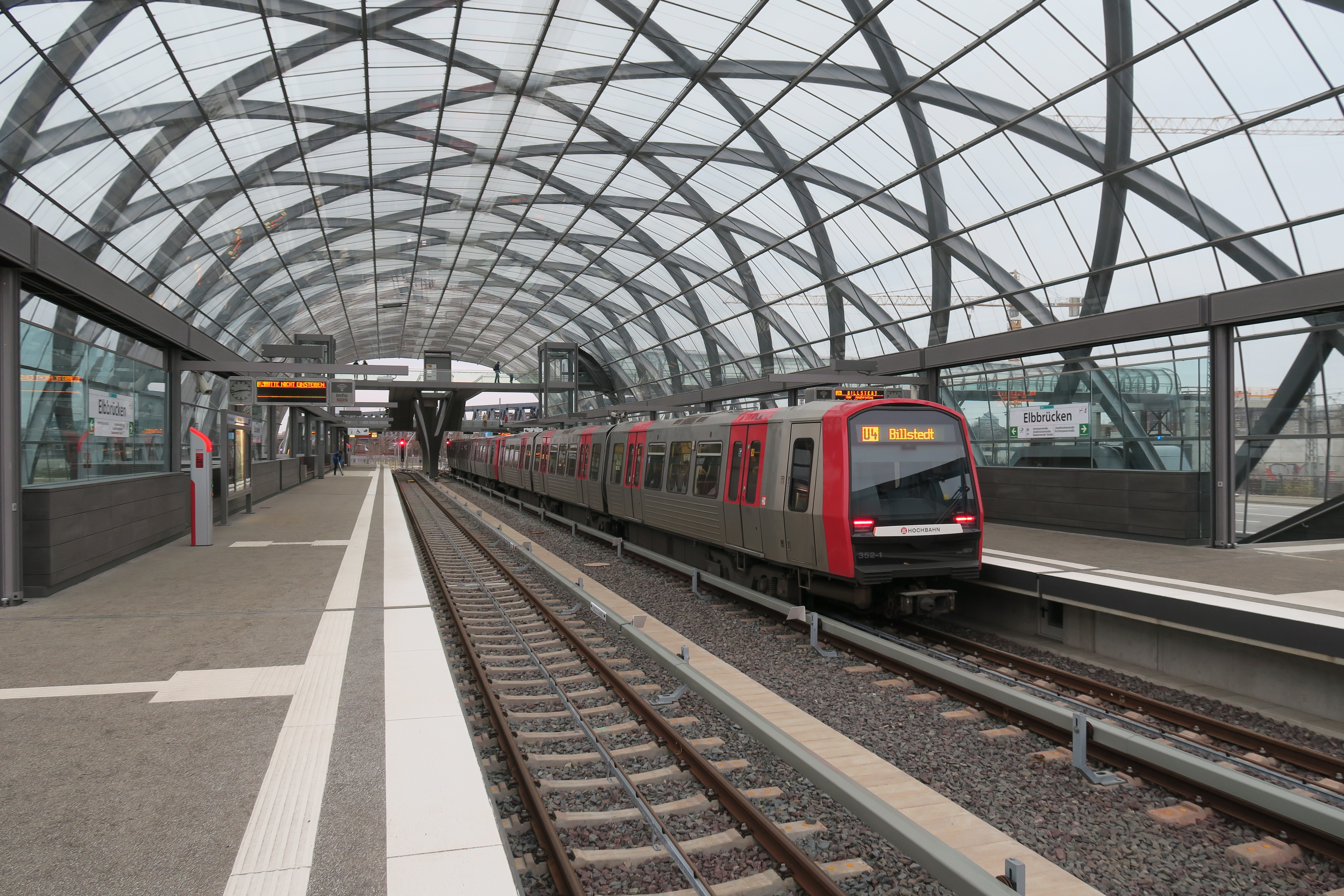

General information
- Location: Zweibrückenstraße; 20457 Hamburg; Hamburg-Mitte; Germany
- Coordinates: 53°32′04″N 10°01′28″E
- System: Hp
- Owner: Deutsche Bahn
- Operator: DB Netz; DB Station&Service
- Lines: Harburg S-Bahn (KBS 101.3)
- Platforms: 2 side platforms
- Tracks: 2
- Train operators: S-Bahn Hamburg
- Connections: S3 S5 U4

Construction
- Structure type: Elevated
- Parking: No
- Cycle facilities: Yes
- Accessible: Yes

Other information
- Station code: 8314
- DS100 code: AELB
- IBNR: -
- Category: 4
- Fare zone: HVV: A/000, 106, and 108
- Website: www.bahnhof.de

History
- Opened: 7 December 2018; 7 years ago (S-Bahn: 15 December 2019)

Services
Preceding station	Hamburg S-Bahn	Following station
Hammerbrook towards Pinneberg	S3	Veddel towards Hamburg-Neugraben
Hammerbrook towards Elbgaustraße	S5	Veddel towards Stade
Preceding station	Hamburg U-Bahn	Following station
Terminus	U4	HafenCity Universität towards Billstedt
Location
- Location within Hamburg Location within Germany Location within Europe

Elbbrücken station (Elbe bridges station) is a public transit terminal station in Hamburg, Germany, near the rail and road bridges called Elbbrücken leading over the Norderelbe. It consists of two elevated platforms, one for the Hamburg U-Bahn which opened in 2018, and one for the Hamburg S-Bahn suburban trains which opened a year later. Each platform has two tracks, interlinked by a "skywalk". The station is the terminus of the U4 U-Bahn line and is between Hammerbrook and Veddel on the S3/S5 S-Bahn lines. It was built to provide easier access to the new HafenCity quarter of Hamburg from the south.

== Construction and opening ==
The U-Bahn station was opened in December 7, 2018. The opening of the S-Bahn stop has been delayed due to problems during construction works. Holes for the foundation could not be drilled as planned because drilling machines partly met resistance at 10 metres (33 ft) below the surface. While the cost for the U-Bahn section was lower than expected – down from €178 million to €145 million, including the route from the previous station HafenCity Universität – the cost for the S-Bahn stop was expected to rise from €43 million to €57 million. The S-Bahn station was opened to the public on the December 15, 2019.

== Gallery ==
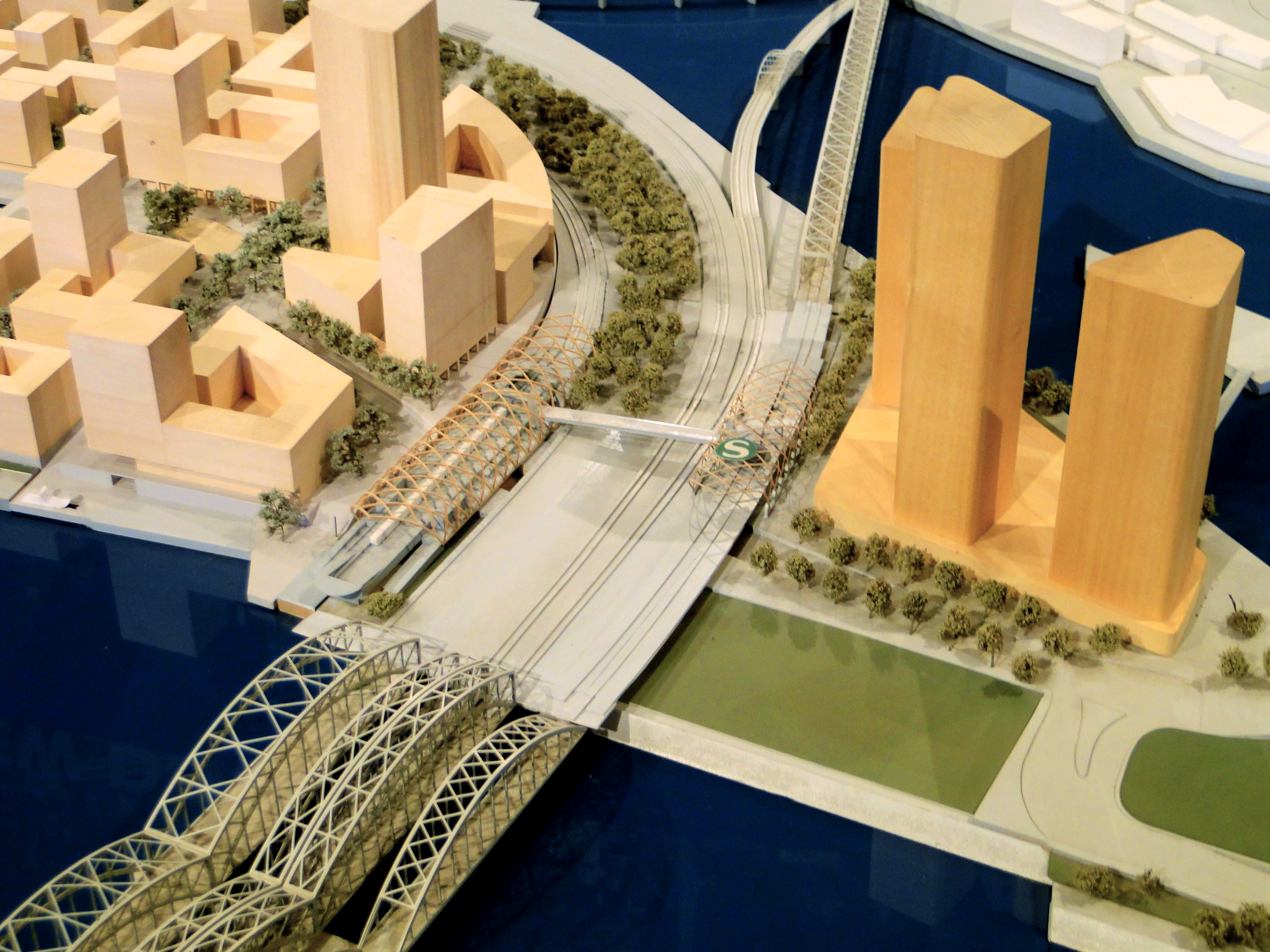
Model of the station site

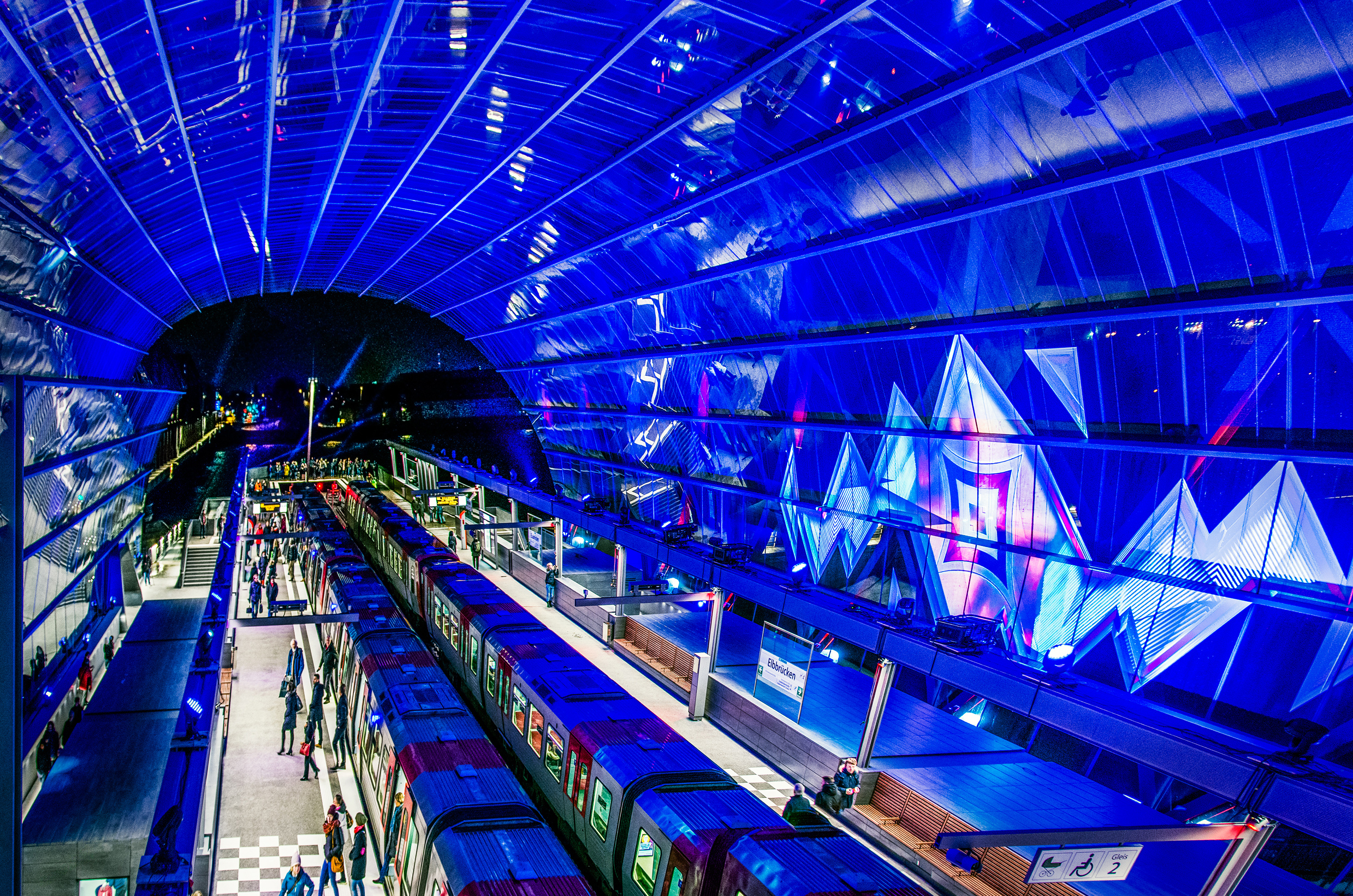
U-Bahn platforms at night

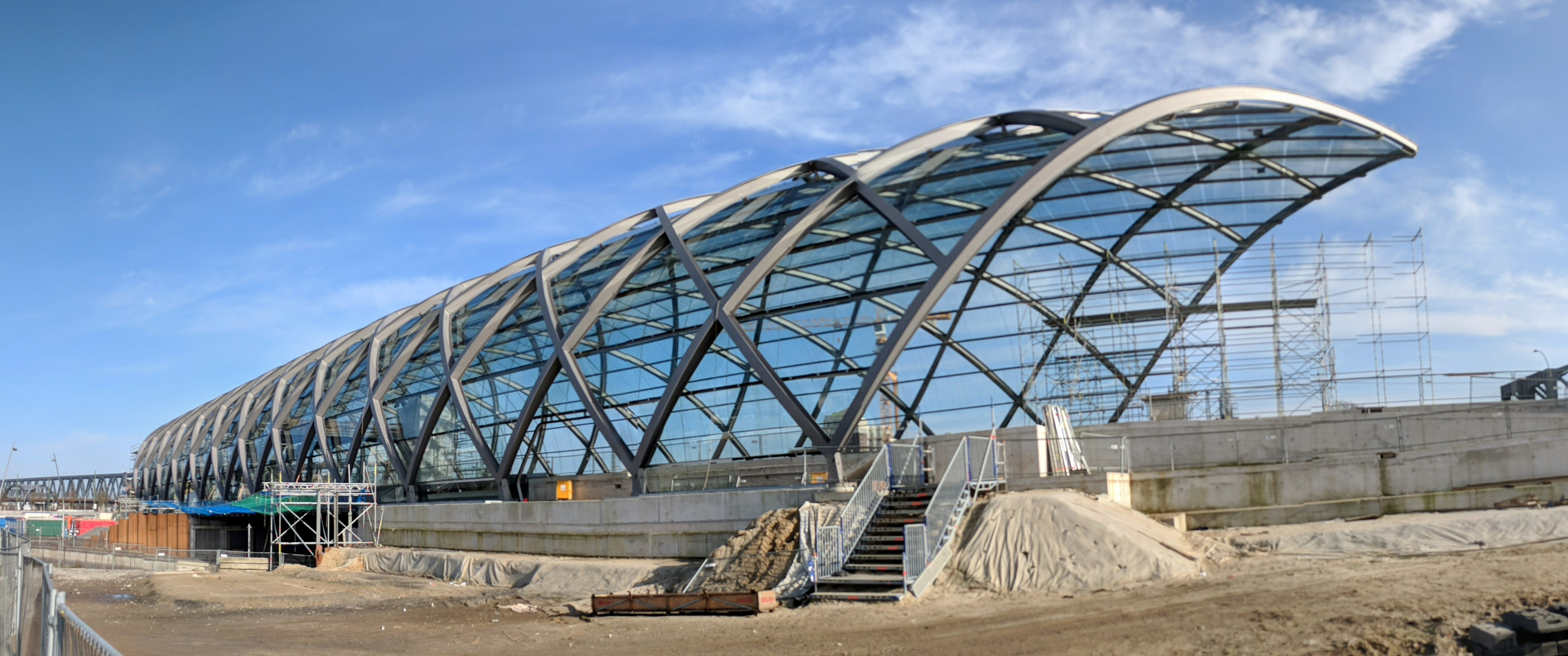
U-Bahn section in February 2018

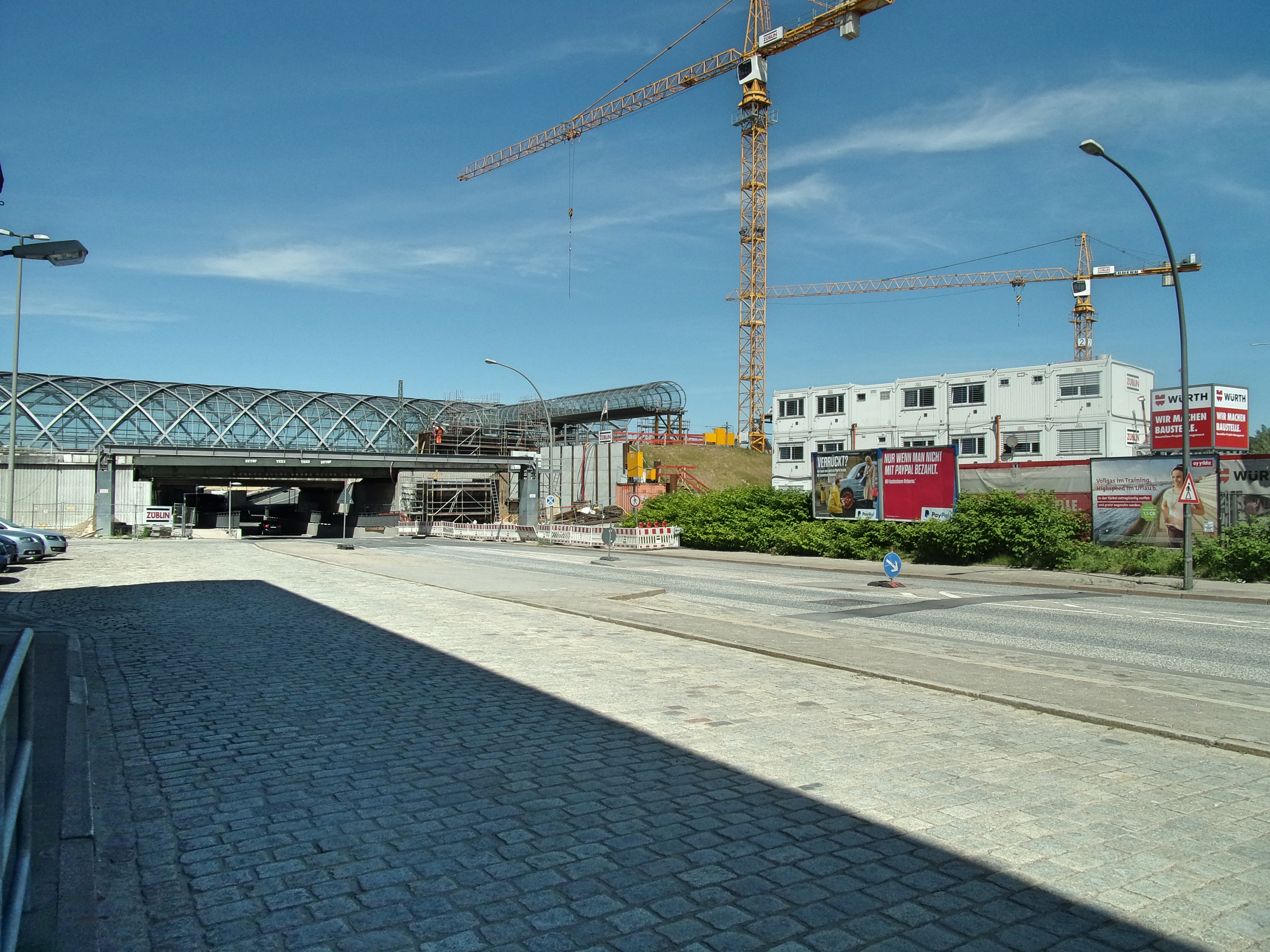
U-Bahn stop, skywalk and S-Bahn stop under construction, May 2018

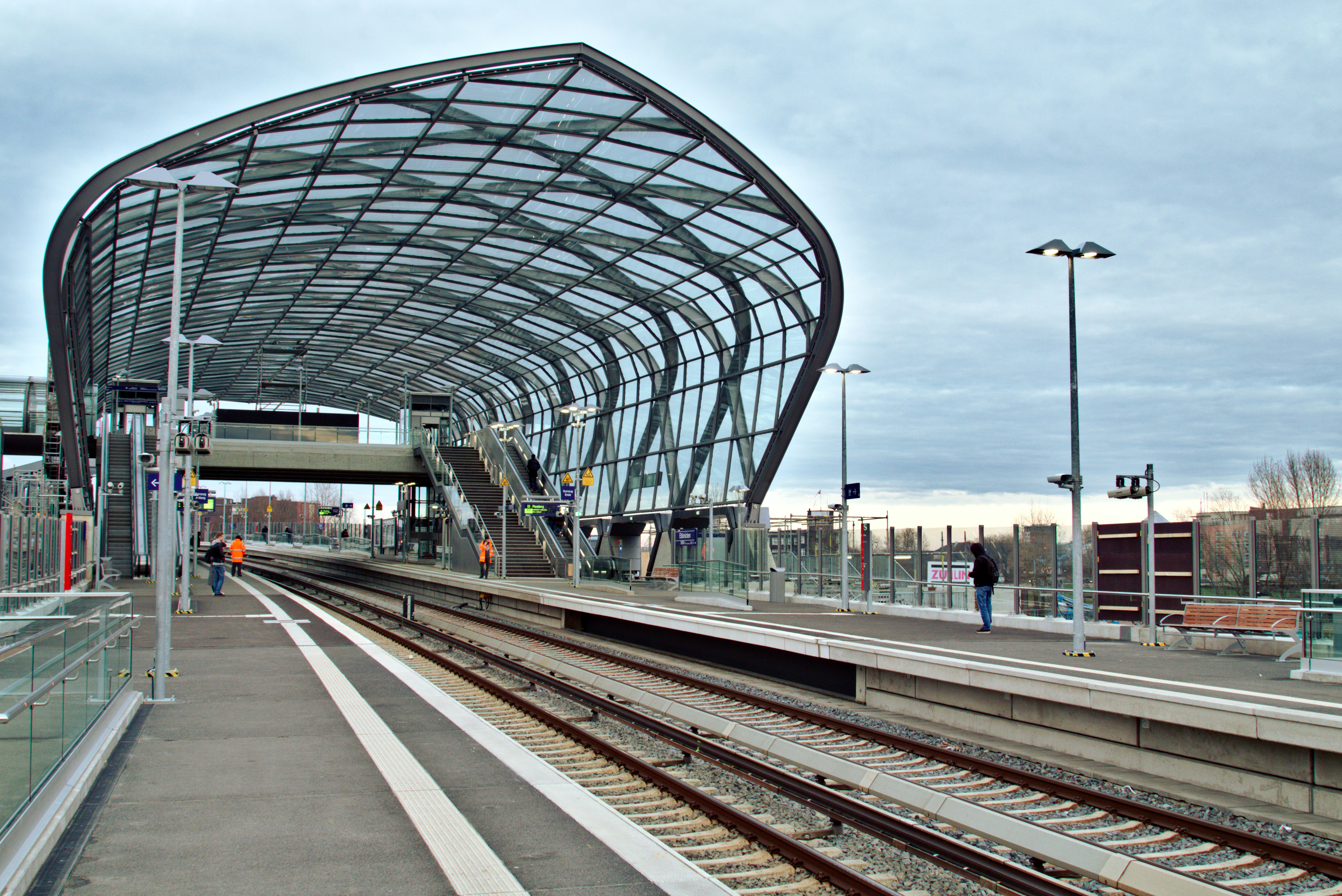
S-Bahn stop just after opening, December 2019
