= Harburg S-Bahn =

Railway line in southern Hamburg, Germany

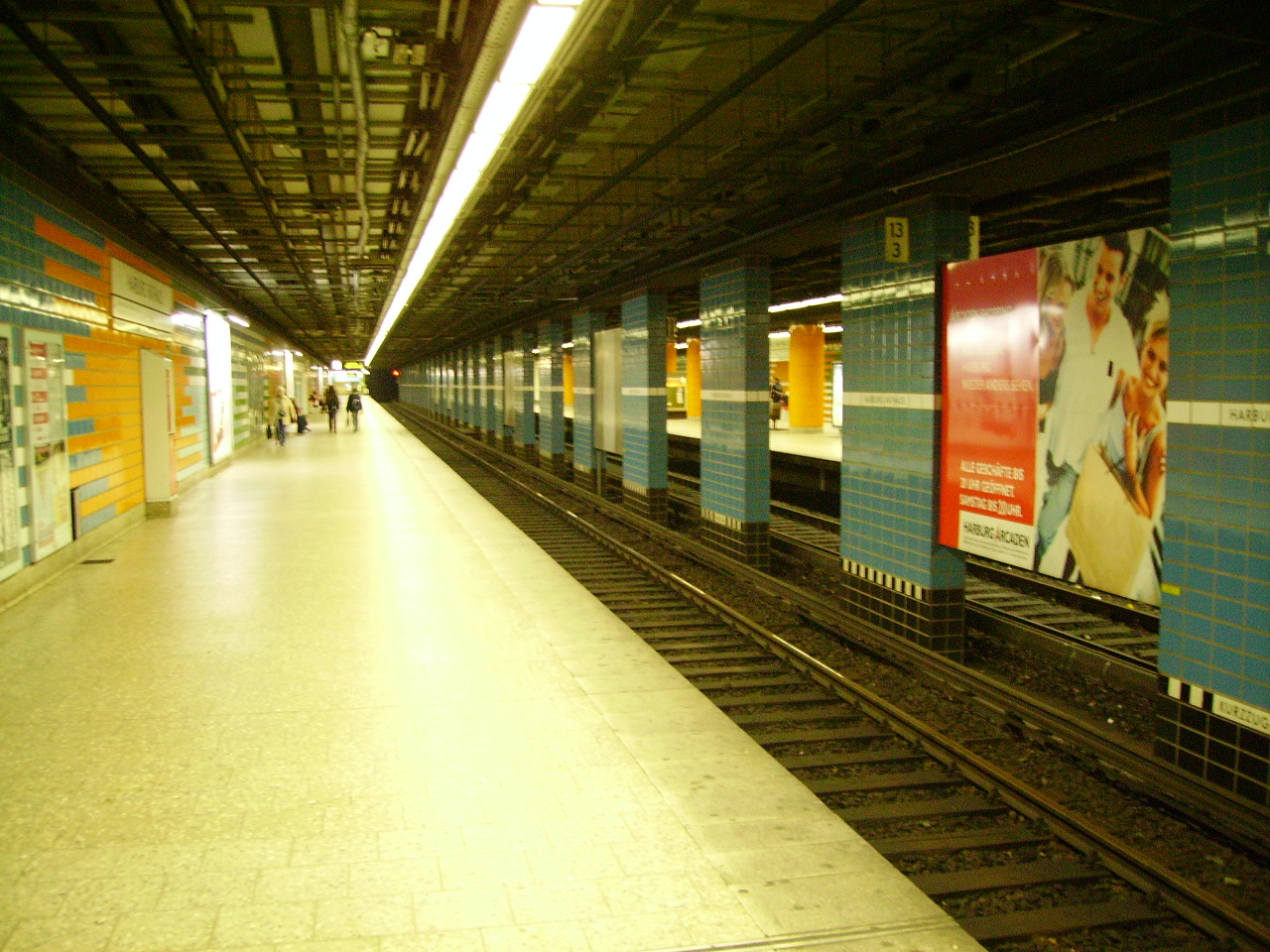
- Platforms of the Harburg Rathaus station in 2009

Overview
- Line number: 1271
- Locale: Hamburg, Germany

Service
- Route number: 101.3, 101.31

Technical
- Line length: 22.732 km (14.125 mi): AC: 22.262 km (13.833 mi); DC: 0.470 km (0.292 mi)
- Track gauge: 1,435 mm (4 ft 8 1/2 in) standard gauge
- Electrification: 15 kV/16.7 Hz AC overhead catenary; 1,200 V DC third rail
- Operating speed: 100 km/h (62 mph)

The Harburg S-Bahn line is a railway line in southern Hamburg, Germany. It starts at Hamburg Hauptbahnhof and runs via Harburg to Stade. It mostly runs parallel with the line to Hanover and the Lower Elbe line and is now part of the Hamburg S-Bahn lines S3 and S31.

== Route ==
The route begins at the Hauptbahnhof, where it climbs a steep ramp before crossing the tracks of the main lines to Berlin and to Lübeck. After running on a concrete viaduct, on which, Hammerbrook station is located, the line crosses the southern freight railway bypass and the Northern Elbe bridge. The line now runs directly parallel with the line to Hanover. After Veddel and Wilhelmsburg stations the line moves away from the Hanover line and dives into a tunnel. The line passes through the stations of Harburg, Harburg Rathaus (which has three platforms) and Heimfeld and then climbs to the surface and runs parallel with the Lower Elbe line. It then passes through the stations of Neuwiedenthal and Neugraben, which has a parking area. After this station there is a change in electrical systems, where S-Bahn trains switch from third rail to overhead wire electrification. The S-Bahn trains then run along the Lower Elbe line, which was upgraded for S-Bahn services in 2006 and 2007.

== History ==
After the inclusion of Harburg-Wilhelmsburg in Hamburg in 1937, the Harburg–Neugraben line was included in the Hamburg S-Bahn network for ticketing purposes. After the founding of the Hamburg Transport Association in 1967, locomotive-hauled trains provided S-Bahn services on the route, marketed as line S3. The long-distance tracks were used between Hamburg Hauptbahnhof and Hamburg-Harburg station. Although this section of the line had four tracks, one pair of tracks was reserved for freight traffic.

Due to the heavy destruction of the port of Hamburg in 1945, Oberhafen and Elbbrücke stations were not reopened.

While the population of the Hamburg district of Hausbruch and Neugraben-Fischbek grew strongly in the 1960s and 70s with the construction of new housing estates, transport connections with central Hamburg was poor: to reach Hamburg Hauptbahnhof a change of trains was required at Harburg. Moreover, trains did not operate at regular intervals.

On 24 September 1983, the S-Bahn line commenced operations from Hamburg to Harburg Rathaus with DC-powered trains. The new line separates from the Hamburg-Altona link line between the Hauptbahnhof and Berliner Tor station. A new station was built on the line at Hammerbrook. Between the Northern Elbe bridge and Harburg the line runs parallel with the main line. The old Veddel and Wilhelmsburg stations on the main line were replaced with stations on the new line. In 1984, S-Bahn line (operating as lines S3 and S31) was extended from Harburg Rathaus to Neugraben. The line runs for about seven kilometres from the Heimfeld district parallel and south of the Lower Elbe line.

A new S-Bahn station was established near the large settlement of Neuwiedenthal. Neugraben station was expanded to five platform tracks and its late nineteenth reception building was replaced with an interchange in the concrete style of the 1980s. An extension of the S-Bahn to the densely populated area of Fischbek was dropped so as not to undermine the viability of the newly established shopping centre in Neugraben.

With the opening of the new S-Bahn line the stations of Unterelbe, Tempo-Werk and Hausbruch on the old main line were abandoned.

Since the timetable change in December 2007, Hamburg S-Bahn operation have been extended from Neugraben via Buxtehude to Stade. These operations use new or remodelled two-system S-Bahn electric multiple units of class 474.3. These services run in mixed operations with Metronom regional trains and with freight trains, using alternating current from the overhead line. In addition, an additional station was established at Fischbek.

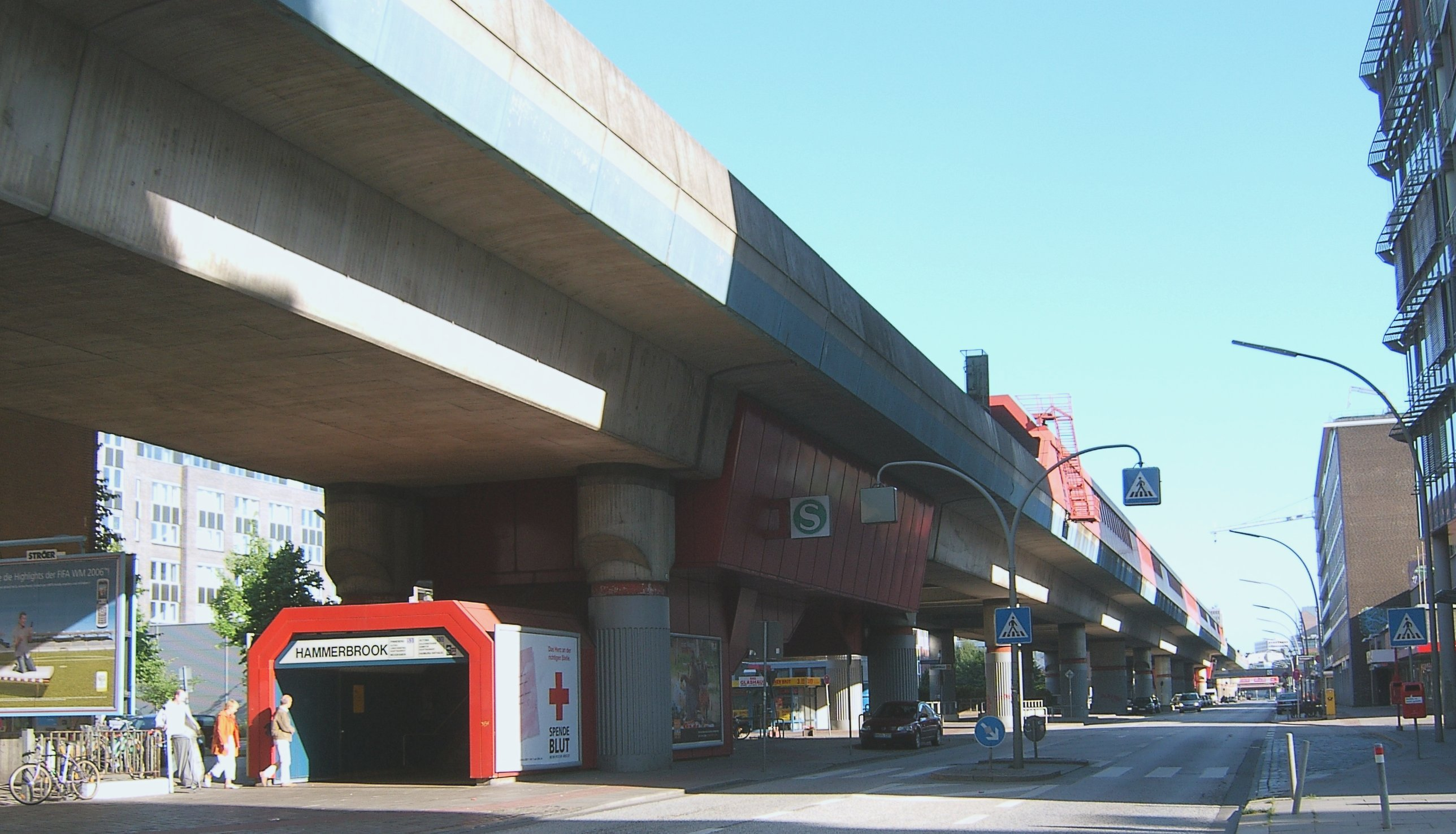
Hammerbrook station
