= Billstedt station =

Metro station in Hamburg, Germany

Billstedt
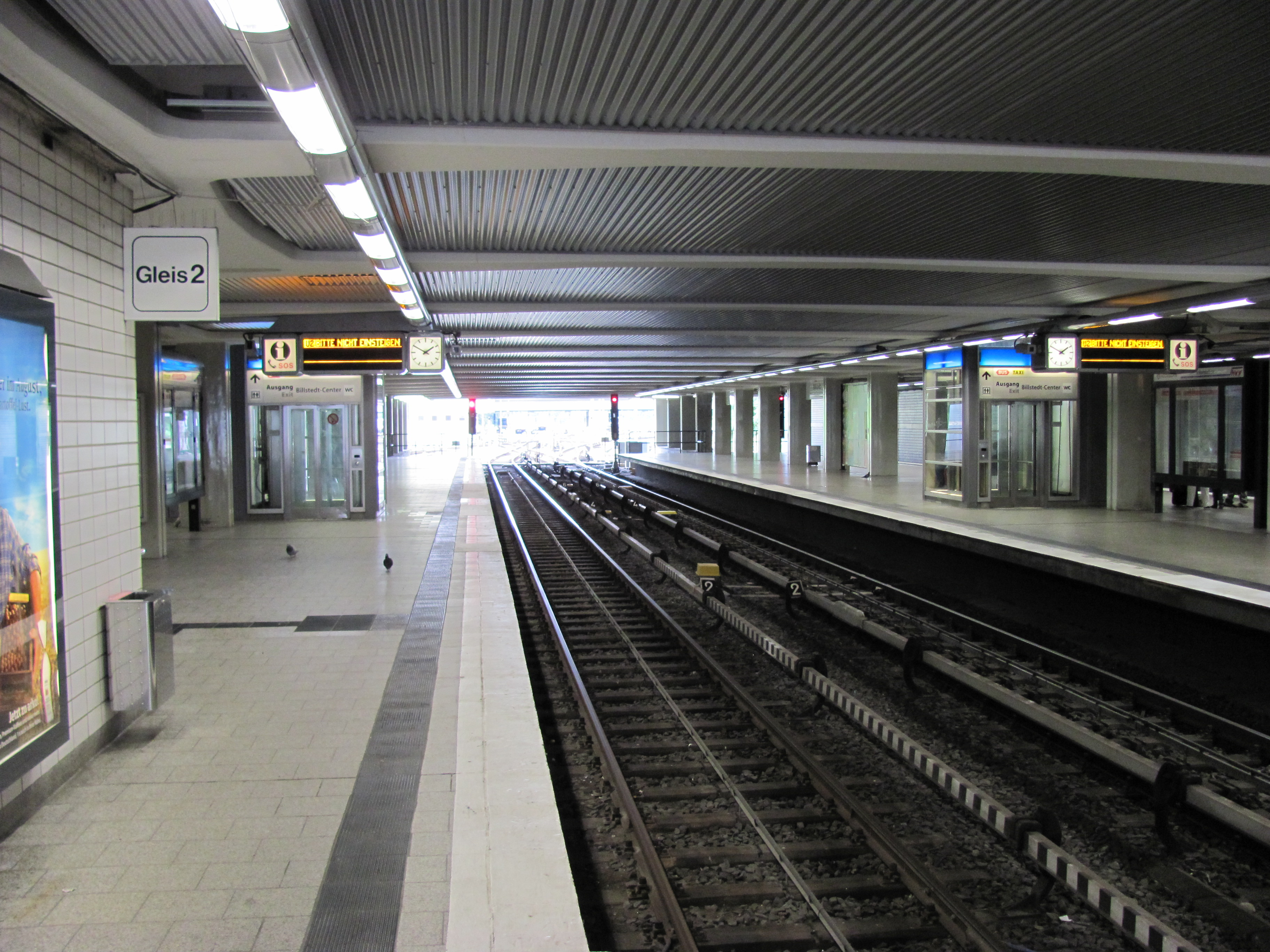

General information
- Location: Billstedter Platz; 22111 Hamburg, Germany
- Coordinates: 53°32′33″N 10°06′25″E
- System: Hamburg U-Bahn station
- Operator: Hamburger Hochbahn AG
- Line: U2 U4
- Platforms: 2 island platforms
- Tracks: 4
- Connections: Bus, Taxi

Construction
- Structure type: Below grade
- Cycle facilities: Bike and ride
- Accessible: Yes

Other information
- Station code: BI
- Fare zone: HVV: A/206

History
- Opened: 28 September 1969
- Closed: Temporarily closed for U4
- Former names: Billstedt

Services
Preceding station	Hamburg U-Bahn	Following station
Legienstraße towards Niendorf Nord	U2	Merkenstraße towards Mümmelmannsberg
Legienstraße towards Elbbrücken	U4	Terminus
Location
- Location within Hamburg Location within Germany

Billstedt is a major rapid transit station on the Hamburg U-Bahn lines U2 and U4. For line U2, Billstedt is a through station; for line U4, it is currently terminus station. Intermodal connections are available to local and regional buses. The station is located in the Hamburg district of Billstedt, Germany. Billstedt is part of the borough of Hamburg-Mitte.

== History ==
The station was opened in 1969, and initially served as terminus station for line U3 until opening of Merkenstraße station in May 1970.

== Layout ==
The station's layout is using a natural depression for the rail tracks to sit below street level, but nevertheless above ground level. The platforms for the U-Bahn trains are capped by the ZOB Billstedt, a central bus station. Adjacent to the bus station is Billstedt-Center, a 40,000 m^{2} (430,000 sq ft) large shopping mall.

== Service ==
=== Trains ===
Billstedt U-Bahn station is served by Hamburg U-Bahn lines U2 and U4; departures into the inner-city are every 5 minutes; trains out east run every 10 minutes.

=== Bus ===
Billstedt ZOB is served by ten HHA bus lines and a number of private bus operators.

== Gallery ==
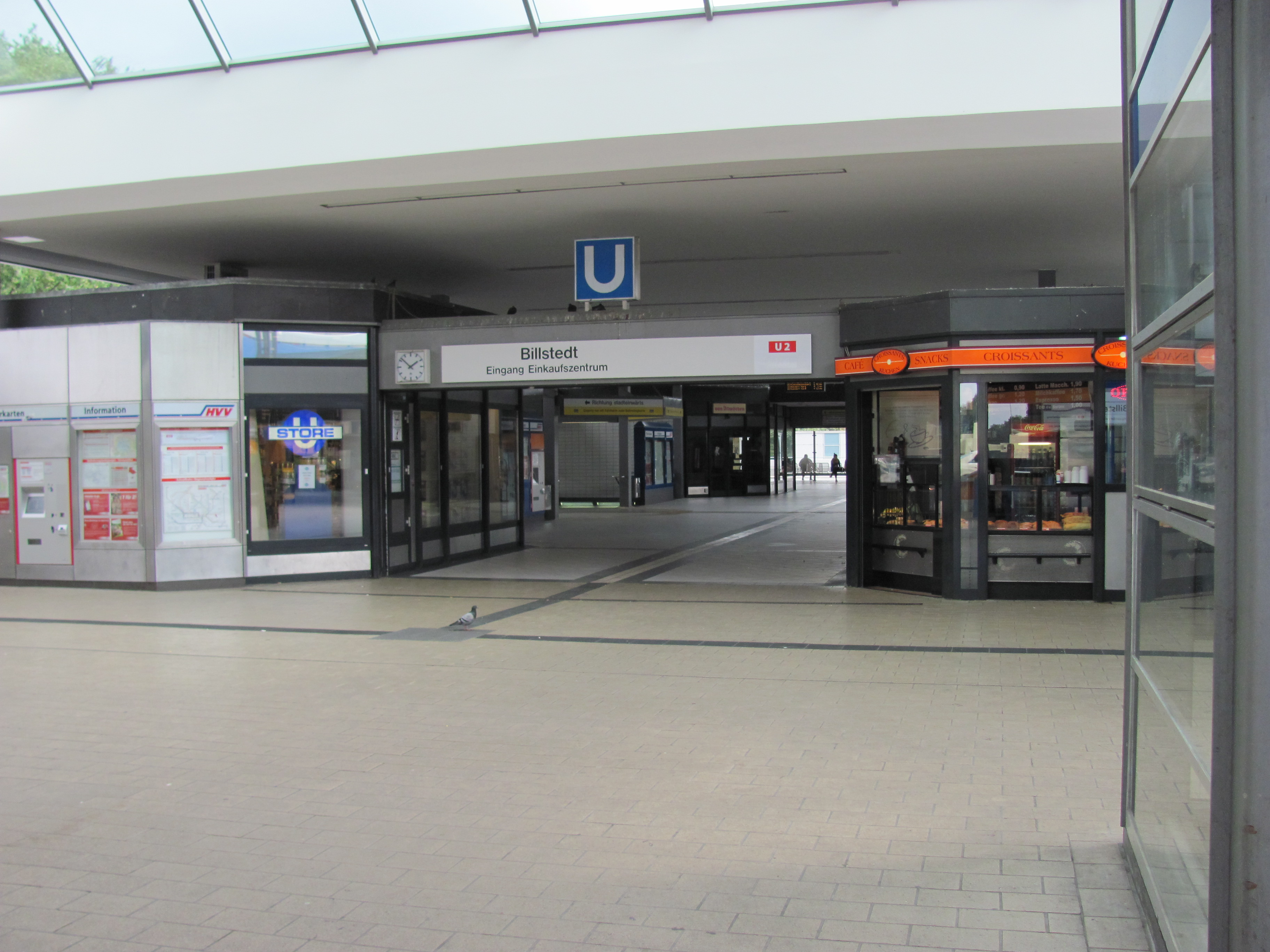
The entrance to trains and shopping mall

== See also ==
- List of Hamburg U-Bahn stations
