= Lehrte station =

Railway station in Lehrte, Lower Saxony, Germany

Lehrte
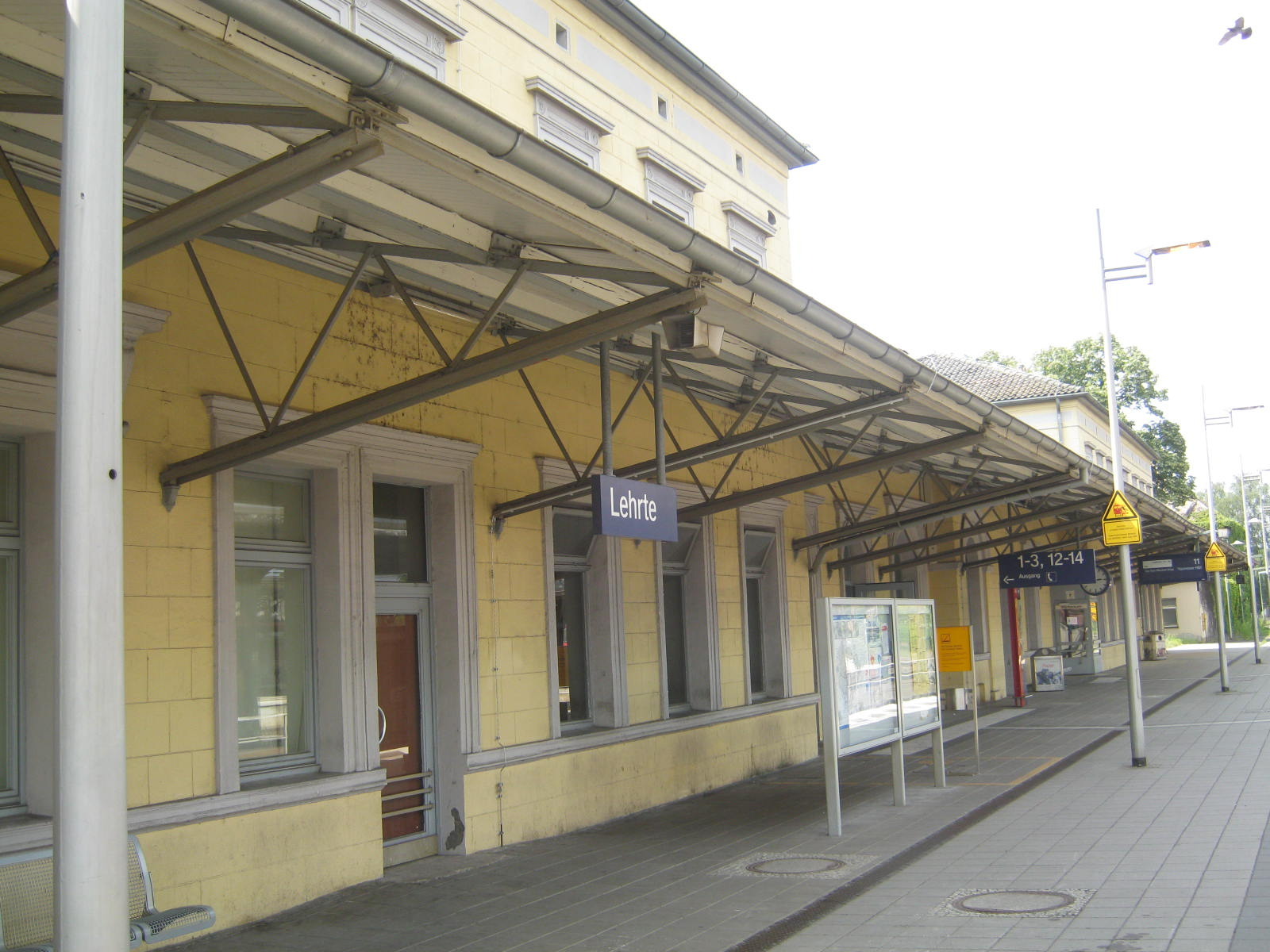
- Lehrte station

General information
- Location: Lehrte, Lower Saxony; Germany
- Coordinates: 52°22′36″N 9°58′28″E
- Lines: Berlin–Lehrte railway; Hanover–Brunswick railway; Hanover–Berlin high-speed railway; Lehrte–Nordstemmen railway; Lehrte–Celle railway
- Platforms: 7

Construction
- Accessible: Yes

Other information
- Station code: 3620
- DS100 code: HLER
- Category: 3
- Fare zone: GVH: C
- Website: www.bahnhof.de

History
- Opened: 15 August 1843

Services
Preceding station	Metronom	Following station
Hannover Hbf Terminus	RE 30	Immensen-Arpke towards Wolfsburg Hbf
Preceding station		Following station
Hannover Hbf towards Rheine	RE 60	Hämelerwald towards Braunschweig Hbf
Hannover Hbf towards Bielefeld Hbf	RE 70	Hämelerwald towards Braunschweig Hbf
Preceding station	Hanover S-Bahn	Following station
Ahlten towards Hannover Hbf	S 3	Sehnde towards Hildesheim Hbf
Ahlten towards Hannover Hbf	S 7	Aligse towards Celle
Location

Lehrte (German: Bahnhof Lehrte) is a railway station located in Lehrte, Germany. The station opened on 15 August 1843 and is located on the Berlin-Lehrte Railway and Hanover–Brunswick railway. The train services are operated by Deutsche Bahn, WestfalenBahn and Metronom.

== History ==
Lehrte had developed by the mid-19th century into a major railway junction of the Royal Hanoverian State Railways (Königlich Hannöverschen Staatseisenbahnen) and it had become known as a typical railway town. The railway line between Hanover and Lehrte via Peine was built in 1843 and extended in the following years to Brunswick (Braunschweig). Branch lines were subsequently built from Lehrte to Celle (1845) and to Hildesheim (1846). In 1844, an entrance building was built in the neoclassical style to a design by Eduard Ferdinand Schwarz.

The Berlin-Lehrte railway was built by the Magdeburg-Halberstadt Railway Company (Magdeburg-Halberstädter Eisenbahngesellschaft, MHE) and was opened throughout in 1871. It competed with the existing line via Magdeburg and Brunswick. The end of the line was at the Lehrter Bahnhof in Berlin, which was demolished in 1958. This was on the site of the new Berlin Hauptbahnhof.

The line to Hildesheim, which had previously run to the south through the centre of the town was relocated in 1990 and reconnected to the Berlin-Lehrte line to the east of Lehrte. As a result, it eased congestion in the centre of the town, which had long been desired. The old railway embankment was converted into an urban green space. As a result, the level crossings that had been common in Lehrte were removed in the centre of the town.

In 1998, a high-speed railway was opened from Hanover to Berlin next to the old Berlin-Lehrte railway via Lehrte, Meinersen, Gifhorn, Wolfsburg, Oebisfelde, Stendal and Spandau. Lehrte station is now used only for regional transport services, as the Intercity-Express and Intercity (IC) services towards Berlin and the IC services towards Leipzig run through without stopping.

By the summer of 2008, the junction in Lehrte was rebuilt again to provide a grade-separated connection for freight trains from the Hanover freight bypass to the east and to give a grade-separated route from Celle to Hildesheim and Brunswick; this involved the raising of the tracks of the high-speed rail line. The long-distance trains from Wolfsburg and Brunswick can now run through Lehrte at 120 km/h.

== Train services ==
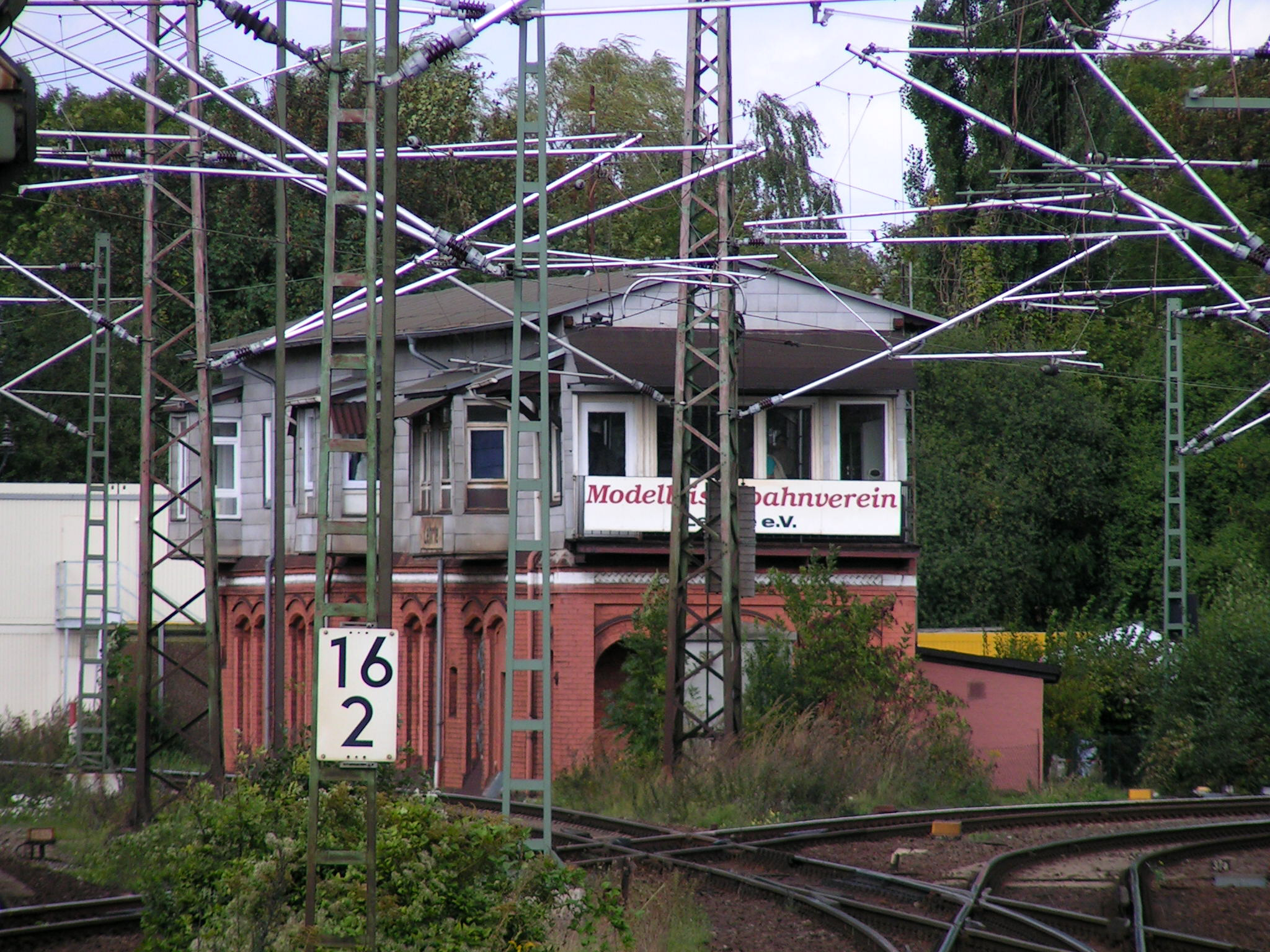
Former signalbox at the separation of the lines to Hannver (left) and Celle (right)

Lehrte is a major hub for public transport in the Großraum-Verkehr Hannover (GVH; Greater Hanover Transport Association) with connections to the Hanover S-Bahn. Trains of various train classes to/from Bielefeld, Brunswick, Celle, Hanover, Hildesheim, Rheine and Wolfsburg stop at Lehrte.

The station is served by the following service(s):

- Regional services RE 30 Hannover - Lehrte - Gifhorn - Wolfsburg
- Regional services RE 60 Rheine - Osnabrück - Minden - Hannover - Braunschweig
- Regional services RE 70 Bielefeld - Herford - Minden - Hannover - Braunschweig
- Hannover S-Bahn services S 3 Hannover - Lehrte - Hildesheim
- Hannover S-Bahn services S 7 Hannover - Lehrte - Celle
