= Ahlten station =

Railway station in Lower Saxony, Germany

Ahlten
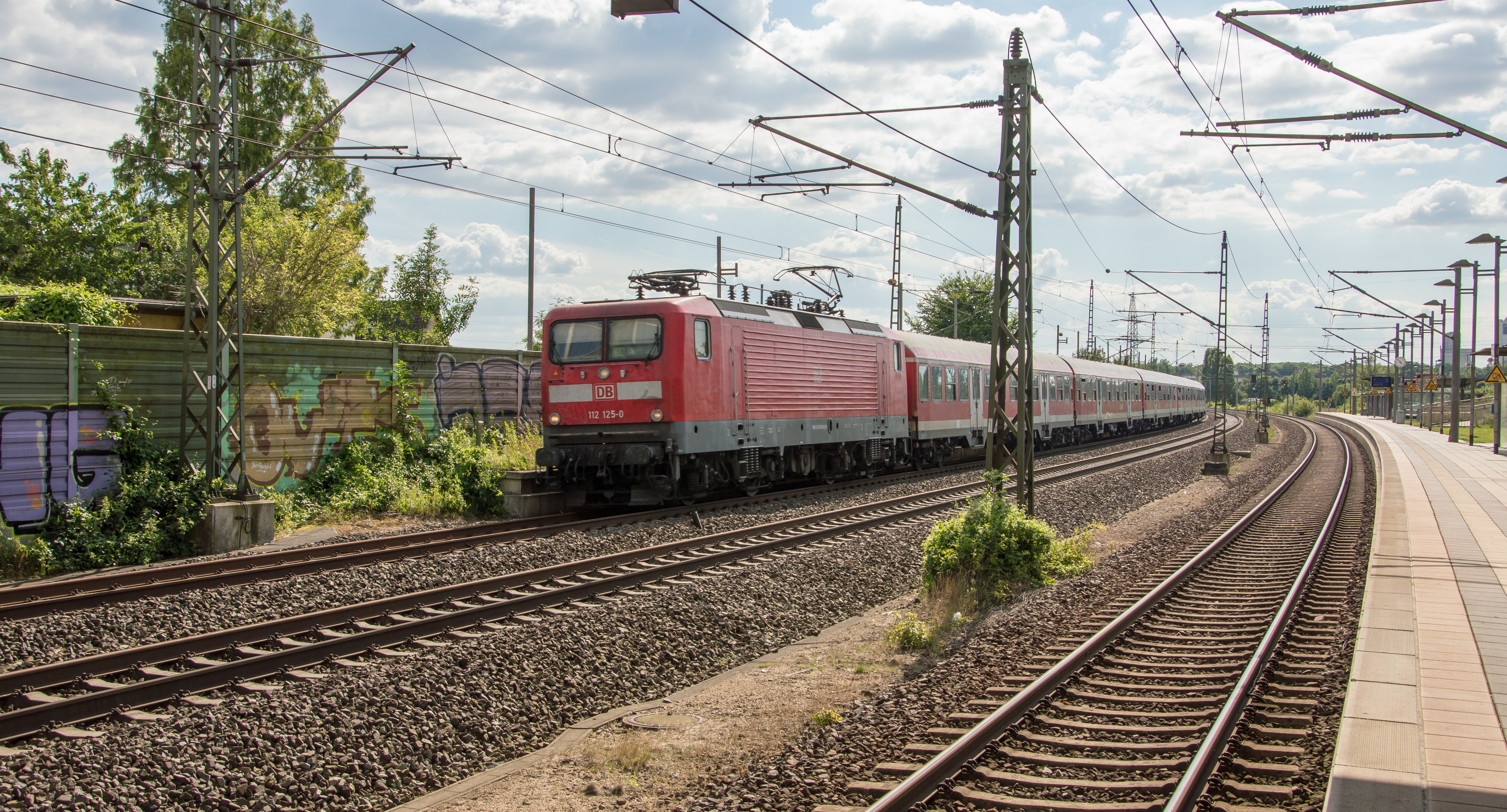
- A Regional-Express train passing through Ahlten station

General information
- Location: Ahlten; Lower Saxony; Germany
- Coordinates: 52°22′34″N 9°54′15″E
- Owner: DB Netz
- Operator: DB Station&Service
- Line: Hanover–Brunswick railway
- Platforms: 1
- Train operators: Hanover S-Bahn

Other information
- Station code: 25
- DS100 code: HALT
- IBNR: 8000443
- Category: 5
- Fare zone: GVH: B
- Website: bahnhof.de

History
- Opened: 1906
- Electrified: 1965

Services
Preceding station	Hanover S-Bahn	Following station
Hannover-Anderten-Misburg towards Hannover Hbf	S 3	Lehrte towards Hildesheim Hbf
Hannover-Anderten-Misburg towards Hannover Hbf	S 7	Lehrte towards Celle
Location
- Location within Lower Saxony Location within Germany Location within Europe

Ahlten is a railway station located in Ahlten, Hannover, Germany. The station is located on the Hanover–Brunswick railway. The train services are operated by Deutsche Bahn as part of the Hanover S-Bahn. The station is served by trains on routes S3 and S7.

The station was opened in 1906 together with the then new branch of the Hanover-Brunswick railway and was rebuilt twice in the 1990s, in particular to accommodate the Hanover S-Bahn services which were established in 1998. The southern platform is now out of use. The tracks of the old Hanover-Brunswick line which now forms part of the Hanover freight bypass railway pass a few metres to the north of Ahlten station and are flanked by low-height auxiliary platforms which were used when trains had to be diverted due to track work. Since the section between Tiergarten junction and the junction from Misburg canal port has been closed in 2003, these platforms are now out of use. The passenger and freight lines meet about 600 m east of the station.
