= Immensen-Arpke station =

Railway station in Lehrte, Germany

Immensen-Arpke

General information
- Location: Arpke, Lower Saxony; Germany
- Coordinates: 52°23′29″N 10°05′01″E
- Line: Berlin–Lehrte railway
- Platforms: 2

Other information
- Station code: 2985
- DS100 code: HIMS
- Category: 6
- Fare zone: GVH: C
Location

Immensen-Arpke (German: Bahnhof Immensen-Arpke) is a railway station located between Arpke and Immensen, in the municipality of Lehrte in the German state of Lower Saxony. The station opened on 15 August 1893 and is located on the Berlin-Lehrte Railway. The train services are operated by Metronom.

During the first years it was used for freight trains until in the beginning 20th century it was also opened for passengers. The station building was sold and is private property.

== Train services ==
The station is serves by the following service(s):

- Regional services RE 30 Hannover - Lehrte - Gifhorn - Wolfsburg

Preceding station	Metronom	Following station
Lehrte towards Hannover Hbf	RE 30	Dollbergen towards Wolfsburg Hbf
