= Dollbergen station =

Railway station in Uetze, Germany

Dollbergen

General information
- Location: Dollbergen, Uetze, Lower Saxony; Germany
- Coordinates: 52°25′01″N 10°10′53″E
- Line: Berlin–Lehrte railway

Other information
- Station code: 1254
- DS100 code: HDOG
- Category: 5
- Fare zone: GVH: C
Location

Dollbergen (German: Bahnhof Dollbergen) is a railway station located in Dollbergen, in the municipality of Uetze in the German state of Lower Saxony. The station is located on the Berlin-Lehrte Railway. The train services are operated by Metronom.

== Train services ==
The station is serves by the following service(s):

- Regional services RE 30 Hannover - Lehrte - Gifhorn - Wolfsburg

| Preceding station | Metronom | Following station |
|---|---|---|
| Immensen-Arpke towards Hannover Hbf | RE 30 | Dedenhausen towards Wolfsburg Hbf |
