= Arpke =

- Stadtteil of Lehrte
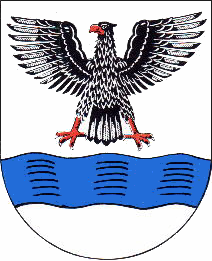
- Coat of arms
- Interactive map of Arpke
- Location within Germany Location within Lower Saxony
- Coordinates: 52°23′16″N 10°05′50″E
- Country: Germany
- State: Lower Saxony
- District: Hanover
- Town: Lehrte

Government
  - Mayor: Klaus Schulz (SPD)

Area
  - Total: 10.69 km^{2} (4.13 sq mi)
- Elevation: 64 m (210 ft)

Population (2015-12-31)
  - Total: 2,879
  - Density: 269.3/km^{2} (697.5/sq mi)
- Time zone: UTC+01:00 (CET)
  - Summer (DST): UTC+02:00 (CEST)
- Postal codes: 31275
- Dialling codes: 05175
- Vehicle registration: H

Arpke is a village in the town of Lehrte in the district of Hanover, in Lower Saxony, Germany. It is situated approximately 30 km east of Hanover.

Since 1893 Arpke has a railway station on the Berlin–Lehrte railway and is connected once per hour to Hanover and Wolfsburg.

== Literature ==
- Frank Henschel: Arpke. Chronik eines Dorfes (Stadtgeschichtliche Hefte der Stadt Lehrte, Band 17), Stadt Lehrte (Hg.), 7/2000, 208 Seiten mit Abbildungen, broschiert
- Heimatbund Arpke (Hg.): Arpke. Nicht nur historische Ansichten eines niedersächsischen Dorfes. Festschrift zum 40jährigen Bestehen des Heimatbundes Arpke, 2005, broschiert, 62 Seiten mit Abbildungen in Schwarz-weiß
