= Hannover-Anderten-Misburg station =

Railway station in Hanover, Germany

Anderten-Misburg
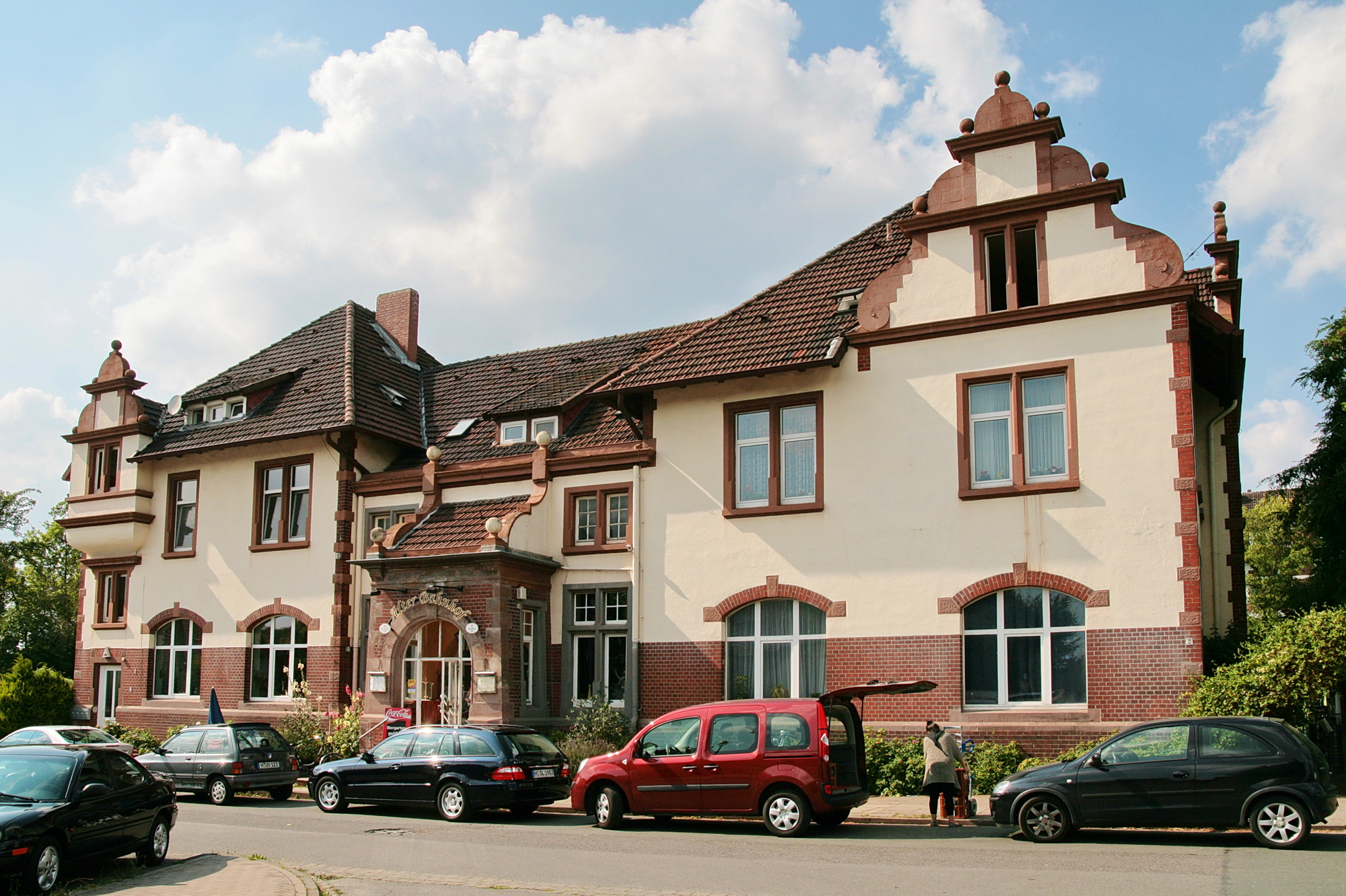

General information
- Location: Anderterstraße 140, 30559 Hannover-Anderten; Lower Saxony; Germany
- Coordinates: 52.3691°N 9.8610°E
- Owner: DB Netz
- Operator: DB Station&Service
- Line: Hanover–Brunswick railway
- Distance: 8.4 kilometres (5.2 mi) from Hannover Hbf
- Platforms: 1 island platform
- Tracks: 2
- Train operators: Hanover S-Bahn

Other information
- Website: bahnhof.de

Services
Preceding station	Hanover S-Bahn	Following station
Hannover Karl-Wiechert-Allee towards Hannover Hbf	S 3	Ahlten towards Hildesheim Hbf
Hannover Karl-Wiechert-Allee towards Hannover Hbf	S 7	Ahlten towards Celle
Location
- Location within Lower Saxony Location within Germany Location within Europe

Hannover-Anderten-Misburg is a railway station located in Anderten and Misburg-Nord, Hannover, Germany. The station is located on the Hanover–Brunswick railway. The train services are operated by Deutsche Bahn as part of the Hanover S-Bahn. Hannover-Anderten-Misburg is served by the S3 and S7. It is in Zone 2 of Hannover.
