= Hanover freight bypass railway =

Railway line in Germany

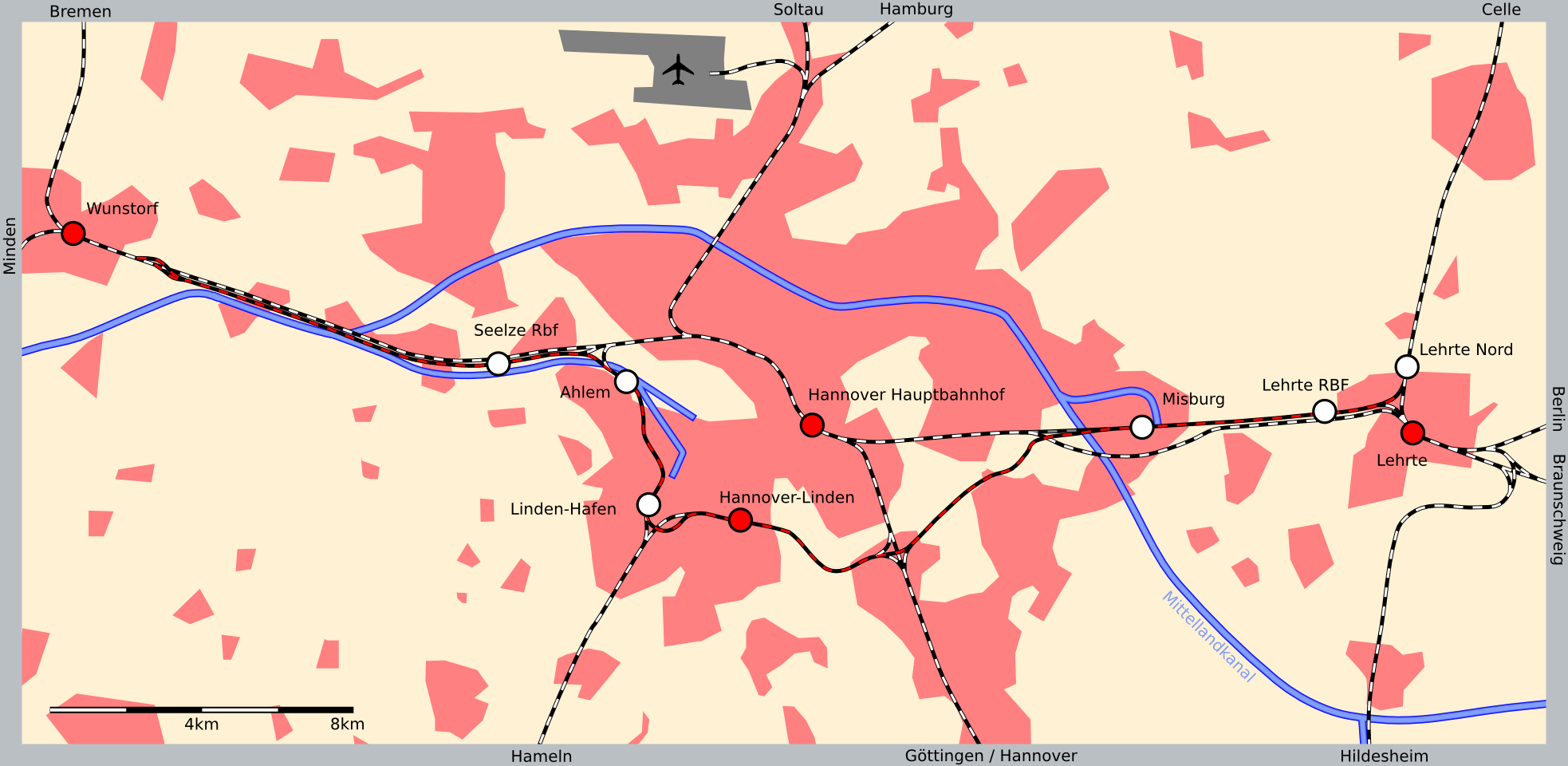

Overview
- Native name: Güterumgehungsbahn Hannover
- Line number: 1750
- Locale: Lower Saxony
- Termini: Wunstorf; Lehrte Nord

Service
- Route number: (only freight)

Technical
- Line length: 43.3 km (26.9 mi)
- Track gauge: 1,435 mm (4 ft 8 1/2 in) standard gauge
- Electrification: 15 kV/16.7 Hz AC overhead catenary

The Hanover freight bypass railway (German: Güterumgehungsbahn Hannover) is a freight railway in the German state of Lower Saxony, which relieves Hannover Hauptbahnhof of freight traffic. It separates freight from passenger traffic on several routes and runs through the western and southern outskirts of the city, bypassing the city centre and the main station.

== Route ==
The freight bypass railway run from Wunstorf via Seelze and the Hanoverian districts of Ahlem, Limmer, Linden, Waldhausen, Waldheim, Kirchrode and Misburg-Süd to Lehrte. The 44-kilometre-long (27 mi) line relieves both the east–west and the north–south links. At the western end of Wunstorf station it branches from the Hanover–Minden railway and the line to Bremen and in the southern urban area crosses the Hanover–Altenbeken and the Hannover–Kassel railways and connects to the north and east ends of Lehrte station to the lines to Celle and Hamburg, to Wolfsburg, to Brunswick and to Hildesheim.

The Hanover freight bypass railway is linked by connecting curves to the following routes:

- Seelze–Hanover main freight yard (from Seelze and from Ahlem)
- Hanover–Altenbeken
- Hannover–Göttingen (from Waldhausen and from Waldheim)
- Hanover–Lehrte (the Tiergarten Misburg connecting curve has been closed since 2003)

== History ==
The freight bypass line was taken into operation in May and July 1909. During World War II, passenger services were often diverted over the freight bypass line.

With the building of the Empelde connecting curve in 1973, a direct connection was created from the Seelze marshalling yard to the Hanover–Altenbeken line. Previously freight trains to and from the Altenbeken line partly used the Bad Münder–Bad Nenndorf railway, which was subsequently abandoned in stages. The most recent major development of the line was the reconstruction of the approaches from the east of Lehrte station in 2008 to enable the grade-separated entry and exit of freight trains to and from Wolfsburg, Brunswick and Hildesheim.

In 2012, the old steel girder bridge over the Ihme east of the Hannover-Linden/Fischerhof station was replaced by a reinforced concrete bridge. It collapsed on the night of 1/2 December 2012 when the supporting structure was being inserted. The 120-metre-long (390 ft) bridge structure was damaged. However, the completion of the bridge was only slightly delayed and it was completed in December.

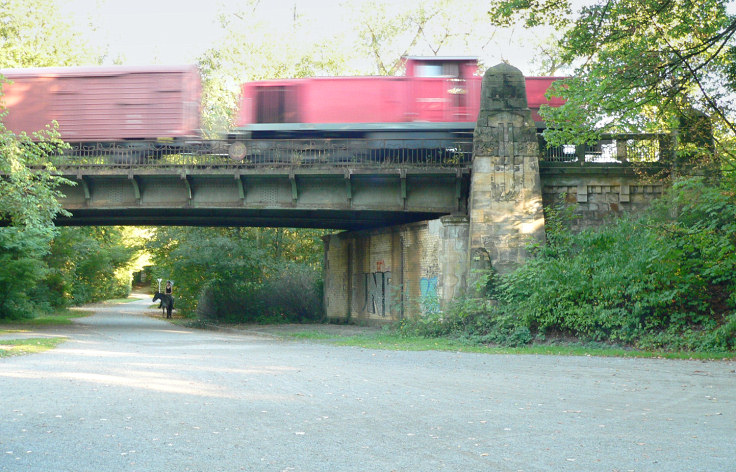
Under the freight bypass railway in Hermann-Löns Park

== Operations ==
Freight traffic in the main corridors to Hanover
Güterzüge	Per day	Calculated averages from daily traffic	
Güterzüge	Per day	Per hour	Interval in minutes
Hamburg – Hanover	200	8.3	7.2
Bremen – Hanover	150	6.3	9.6
Hanover – Fulda/Gießen	250	10.4	5.8
Minden – Hanover – Brunswick – Magdeburg	160	6.7	9.0
Source: Schienennetz 2025/2030: Ausbaukonzeption für einen leistungsfähigen Schienen- güterverkehr in Deutschland. This does not include passenger traffic, therefore actual traffic density can be higher.

The freight bypass railway is one of the main double-track railways in Germany. Due to the line being largely shared by traffic running north–south between seaports and the hinterland and traffic running east–west, trains run virtually continuously. The fact that lines running parallel with it have been dismantled or are not electrified (such as the Elze–Löhne railway), mean that there is such a strong concentration of traffic that minor events on the line can lead to traffic jams.

Trains running between the access routes from Hamburg via Celle and Verden and the exits via Hamelin and Altenbeken and on the North–South railway or in the opposite direction can use the line.

The line is also used by passenger trains when they are diverted over the line during construction work on other lines.

The line is also used by scheduled passenger trains that do not stop in Hannover Hauptbahnhof, such as the ICE Sprinter service on the Berlin–Frankfurt–South Germany route. Also trains runs to Hannover Messe/Laatzen station for the Hanover Fair several times a year over the line.

== Infrastructure ==
The line consists almost entirely of an embankment with bridges crossing over a large number of bridges across watercourses, roads and railways between Ahlem and Misburg. Many of the bridges have been extended to allow the widening of routes running under it. Thus, the original bridge spanning two tracks over the line to Göttingen was rebuilt during the construction of the Hanover–Würzburg high-speed railway to allow four tracks to run under it. Before Expo 2000, the bridge was again extended to allow an S-Bahn track to pass under it. In the years since 2000, tracks and points have been replaced with concrete sleepers (type B70) and 60 kg/m rail.

== Noise and noise protection ==
When the line was built it still ran through a rural area. Particularly in the city of Hanover, built-up areas have grown ever closer to the track. In 1990, when the increasingly noisy diesel class 132 locomotives built for Deutsche Reichsbahn began to be used, a citizens' initiative was launched to reduce noise on the line. Edelgard Bulmahn, the local member of parliament and later a Federal Minister, supported the call. It was one of the first lines to have noise protection built on an existing line, after the allocation of funds for this purpose by the Bundestag.
