= Battle of Sievershausen =

1553 battle in Germany

Coordinates: 52°22′33″N 10°06′46″E

- Part of the Second Margrave War
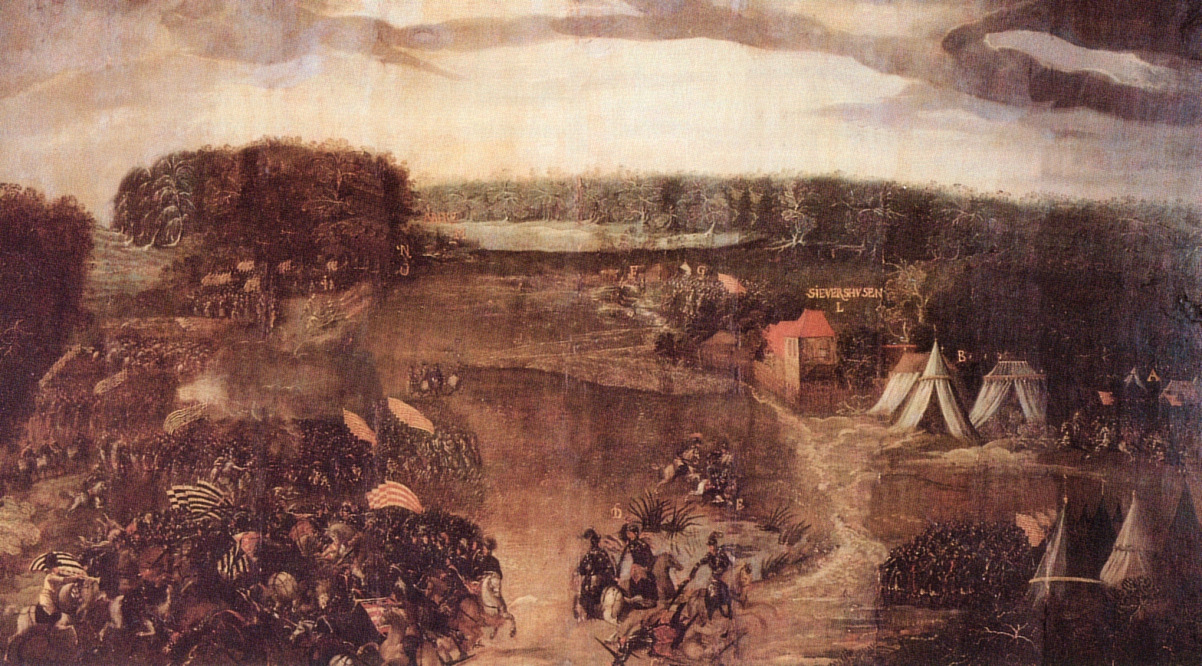
- Oil painting of the battle, c. 1600
Date	9 July 1553
Location	Sievershausen, Principality of Brunswick-Wolfenbüttel
Result	Allied victory

Belligerents
Electorate of Saxony; Principality of Brunswick-Wolfenbüttel	Margraviate of Brandenburg-Kulmbach

Commanders and leaders
Maurice of Saxony (DOW); Henry V of Brunswick-Wolfenbüttel	Albert Alcibiades, Margrave of Brandenburg-Kulmbach

Strength
15,500; 25 guns	18,000

Casualties and losses
- Combined: 4,000 killed, 8,000 wounded

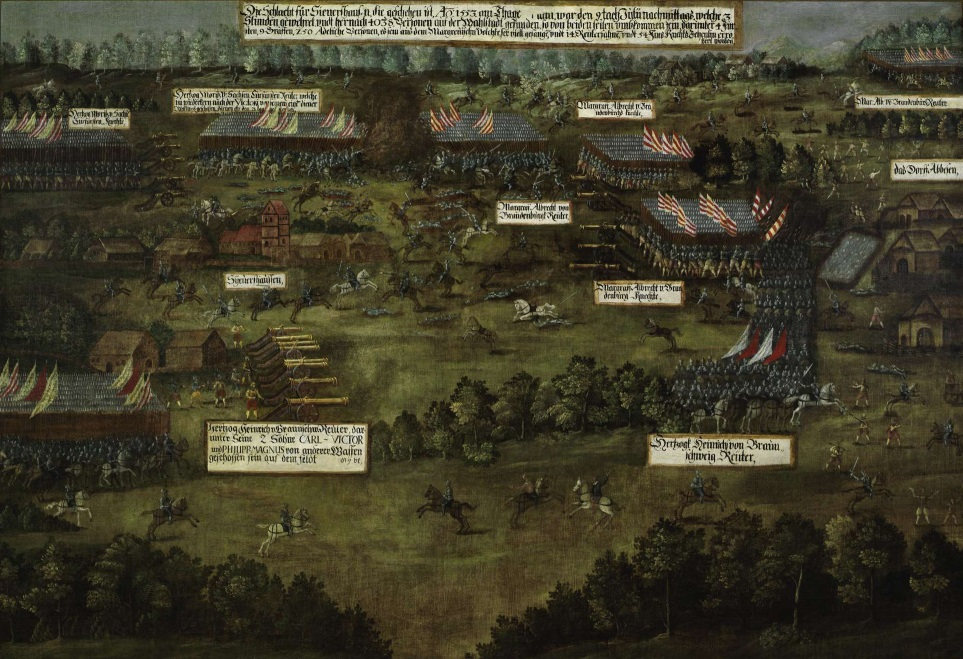
Painting of the battle of Sievershausen from the second half of the 16th century or the first half of the 17th century

The Battle of Sievershausen occurred on 9 July 1553 near the village of Sievershausen (today part of Lehrte in present-day Germany), where the forces of the Hohenzollern margrave Albert Alcibiades of Brandenburg-Kulmbach fought against the united troops of Elector Maurice of Saxony and Duke Henry V of Brunswick-Wolfenbüttel. With 4,000 men killed, including the Saxon elector and two of Henry's sons, it was one of the bloodiest battles on Lower Saxon territory. Margrave Albert was defeated.

== Prelude ==
Albert of Brandenburg-Kulmbach had sparked the Second Margrave War against the Franconian Prince-bishoprics in 1552, cutting a path of destruction with his plundering mercenary army on its way to Northern Germany. Arriving in the Duchy of Brunswick-Lüneburg, he campaigned against Henry V of Wolfenbüttel, who gained support from Elector Maurice as well as from his Lüneburg cousins. The Saxon elector had just signed the Peace of Passau with Emperor Charles V as a leader of insurgent Protestant princes, and the turmoil caused by his former ally turned up at the wrong time.

The two sides first encountered on the Leine river near Sarstedt, though no action was taken. Margrave Albert headed for the city of Brunswick, when the enemy forces blocked his passage on the Fuhse creek near Sievershausen.

== Battle ==
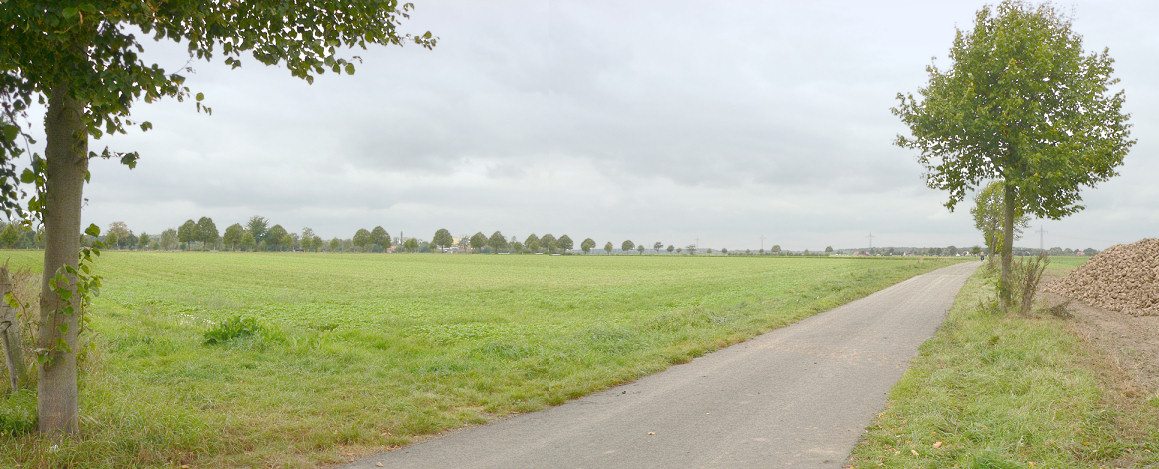
The battlefield in 2006

The battle took place in an open field (Feldmark) between the villages of Sievershausen and Arpke. The Saxon-Brunswick troops attacked with about 15,500 men (8,000 infantry and 7,500 cavalry) and 25 guns, the margrave had 18,000 mercenaries (12,000 infantry and 6,000 cavalry) at his command. The opposing cavalry forces fired their pistols at close range, causing heavy losses, and then charged home. Initially Albert managed to repel the attacking forces, however, the Saxon army turned around and positioned itself behind the defending forces. After four hours of bitter fighting, the margrave fled from the battlefield. His retreat was covered by General Joachim von Röbel, who became famous as a result and ended his days as a field-marshal.

Among the many casualties were Saxon and Brunswick nobles and knights, including the two elder sons of Duke Henry V, Philip Magnus and Charles Victor, resulting in the succession to the throne of their younger brother Julius. Elector Maurice allegedly was killed by friendly fire, when a shot by one of his own men struck the abdomen and caused major injuries he two days later succumbed to. His mortal remains were transferred to Saxony; his armor kept in Freiberg Cathedral shows the bullet hole at waist level. Many rumours were circulating in connection with his death; he most likely died due to wound infection.

== Aftermath ==
With Albert's defeat, public peace was secured and could be perpetuated in the Augsburg Settlement two years later. On the 300th anniversary of the battle in 1853, a memorial stone was erected to commemorate the death of Elector Maurice.

Since 1967, the local parish church has been a meeting place of several German peace movement groups. An anti-war museum in Sievershausen opened in 1979.

== Bibliography ==
- Delbrück, Hans (1985) [1920]. History of the Art of War volume 4: The Dawn of Modern Warfare. Translated by Walter J. Renfroe Jr. Lincoln: University of Nebraska Press. ISBN 0-8032-6586-7.
