= Dedenhausen station =

Railway station in Lower Saxony, Germany

Dedenhausen

General information
- Location: Dedenhausen, Uetze, Lower Saxony; Germany
- Coordinates: 52°25′56″N 10°14′21″E
- Line: Berlin–Lehrte railway
- Platforms: 2

Other information
- Station code: 1146
- DS100 code: HDEH
- Category: 6
- Fare zone: GVH: C; VRB: 56 (GVH transitional tariff)
Location

Dedenhausen (German: Bahnhof Dedenhausen) is a railway station located in Dedenhausen, in the municipality of Uetze in the German state of Lower Saxony. The station is located on the Berlin-Lehrte Railway. The train services are operated by Metronom.

== Train services ==
The station is serves by the following service(s):

- Regional services RE 30 Hannover - Lehrte - Gifhorn - Wolfsburg

Preceding station	Metronom	Following station
Dollbergen towards Hannover Hbf	RE 30	Meinersen towards Wolfsburg Hbf
