= Hanover–Brunswick railway =

Railway line in Germany

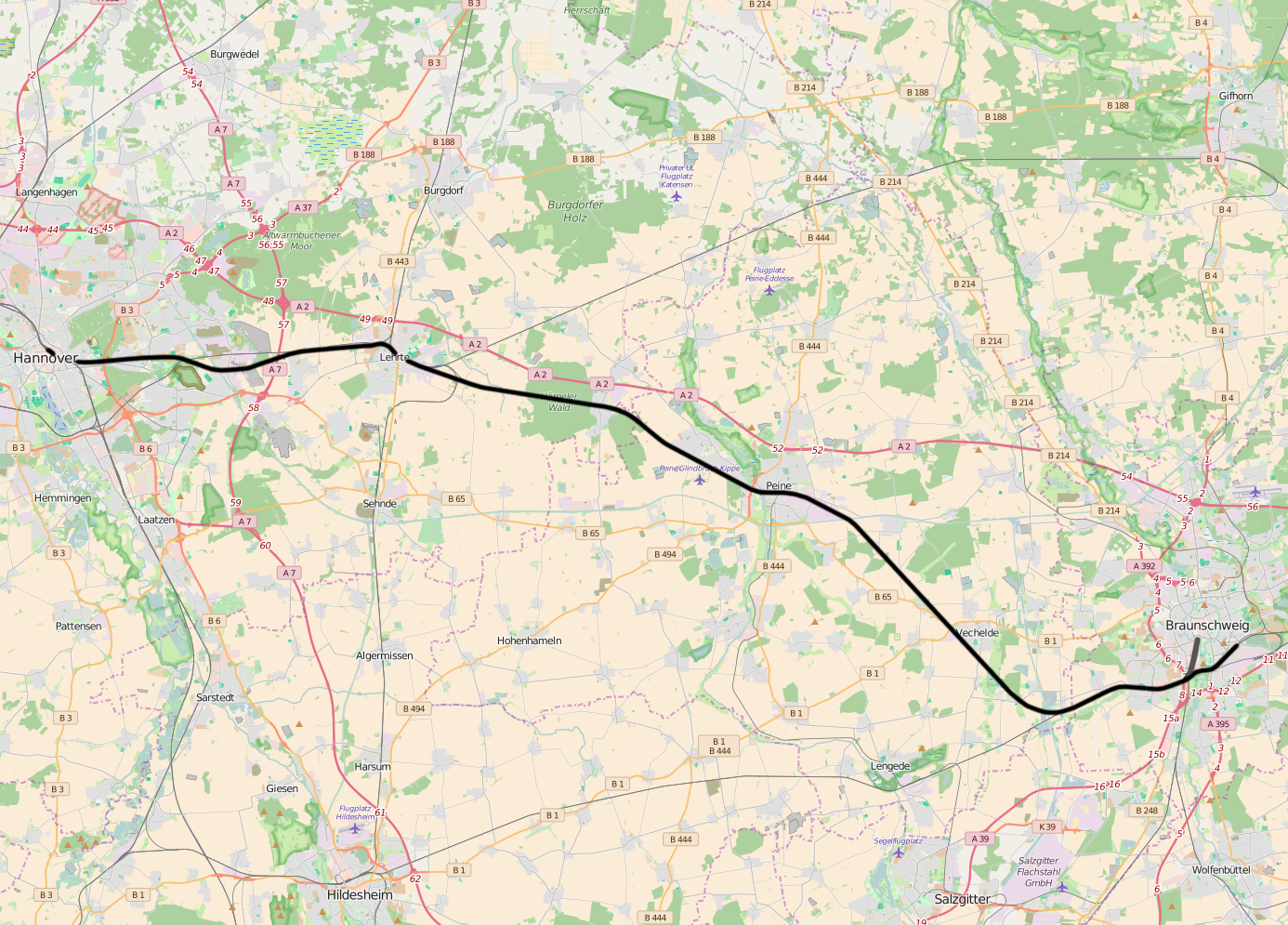

Overview
- Native name: Bahnstrecke Hannover–Braunschweig
- Line number: 1730
- Locale: Lower Saxony, Germany
- Termini: Hanover Hauptbahnhof; Brunswick Hauptbahnhof

Service
- Route number: 310, 207 (1964)

Technical
- Line length: 61 km (38 mi)
- Number of tracks: 2
- Track gauge: 1,435 mm (4 ft 8 1/2 in) standard gauge
- Electrification: 15 kV/16.7 Hz AC catenary
- Operating speed: 140 km/h (87 mph) (maximum)

The Hanover–Brunswick Railway is a German main line railway in Lower Saxony and is one of the oldest lines in Germany, opened in 1843 and 1844. It was the first railway line linking to the city of Hanover and the first operating line of the Royal Hanoverian State Railways (German: Königlich Hannöversche Staatseisenbahnen). It is now one of the main routes for east-west traffic. The main intermediate station is Peine.

== Route ==
The route is flat and straight through the North German Plain. It leaves Hanover to the east. Originally it ran almost straight to Lehrte. Now it makes a slight curve south to Anderten. In Lehrte it connects with several other key routes, including the Berlin–Lehrte railway, including the Hanover–Berlin high-speed line. It then turns southeast to Peine and proceeds further to the southeast and takes in Groß Gleidingen, where it connects with the Hildesheim–Brunswick railway. It then turns to the east, reaching Brunswick from the southwest.

== History ==
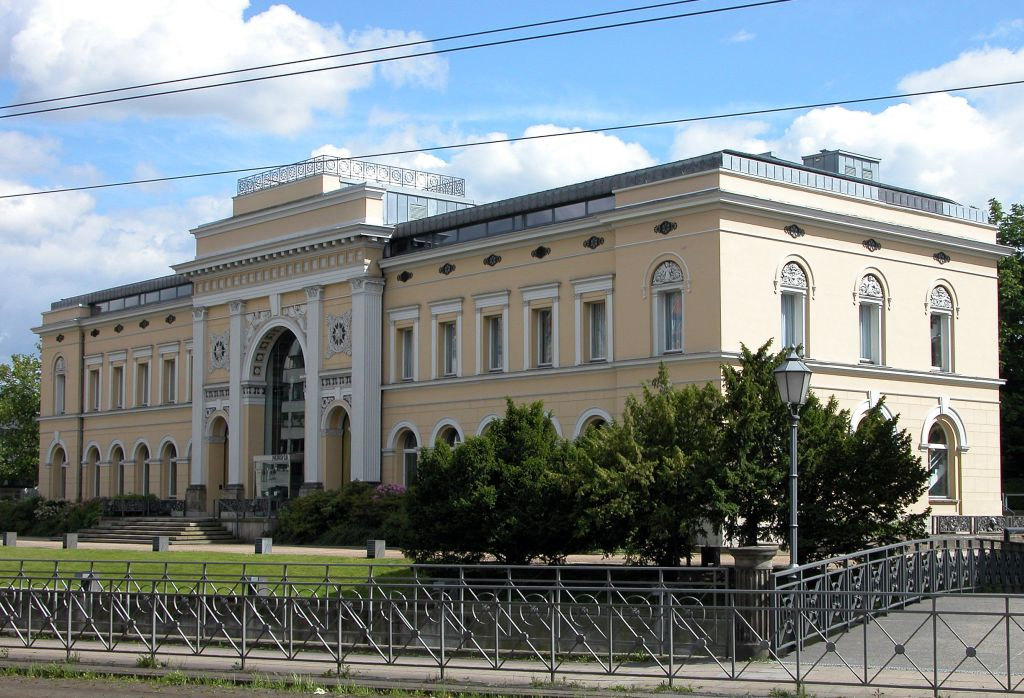
Old Brunswick station, closed in 1960

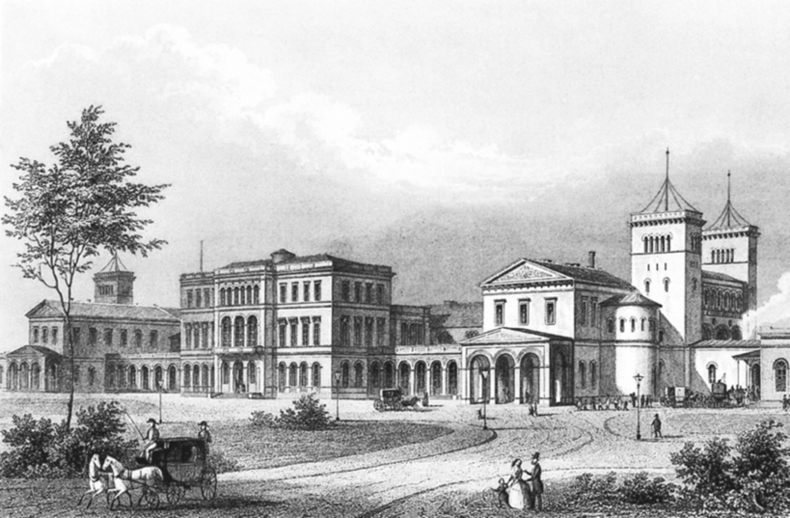
Original Hanover central station in 1850

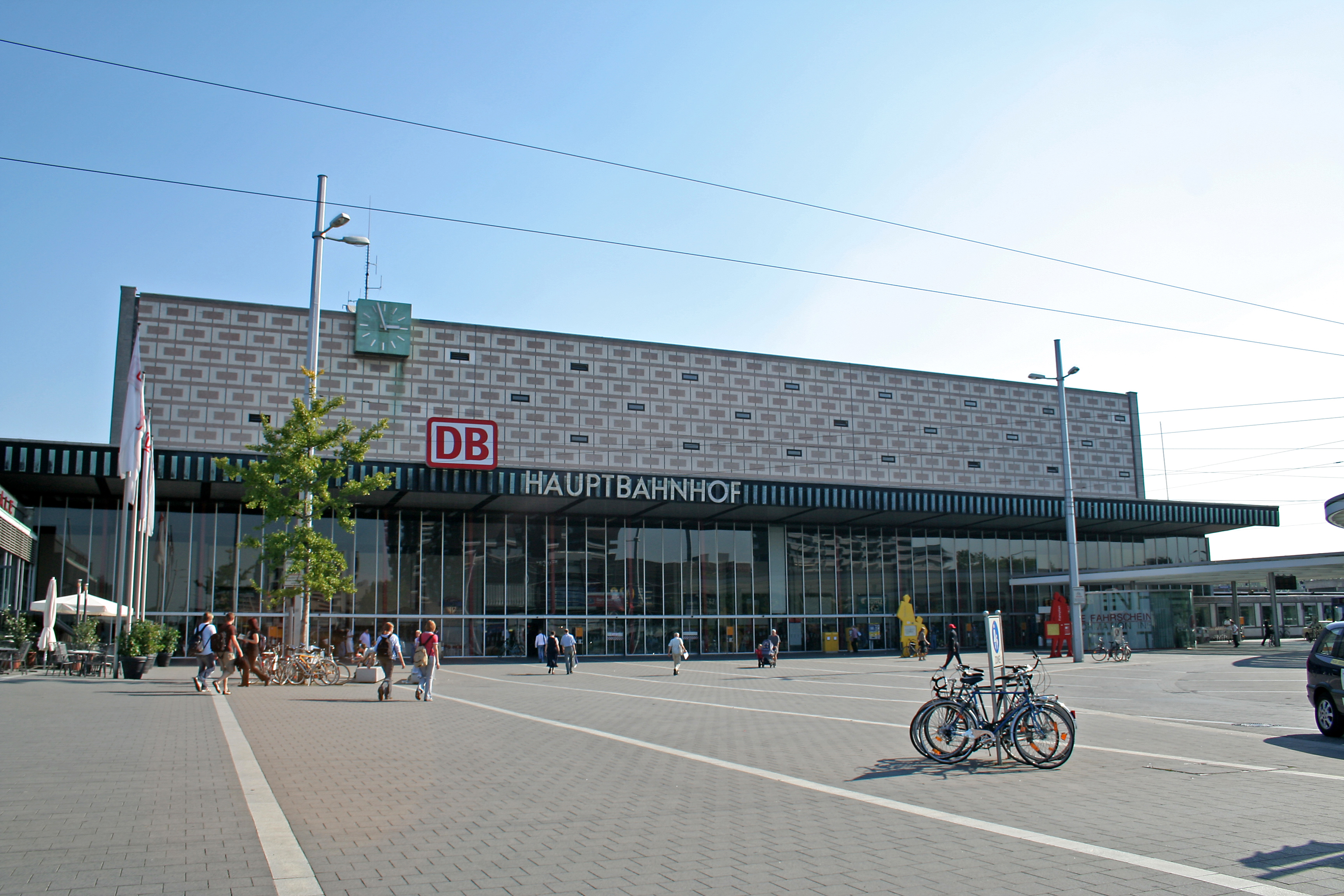
Brunswick Hauptbahnhof, opened in 1960

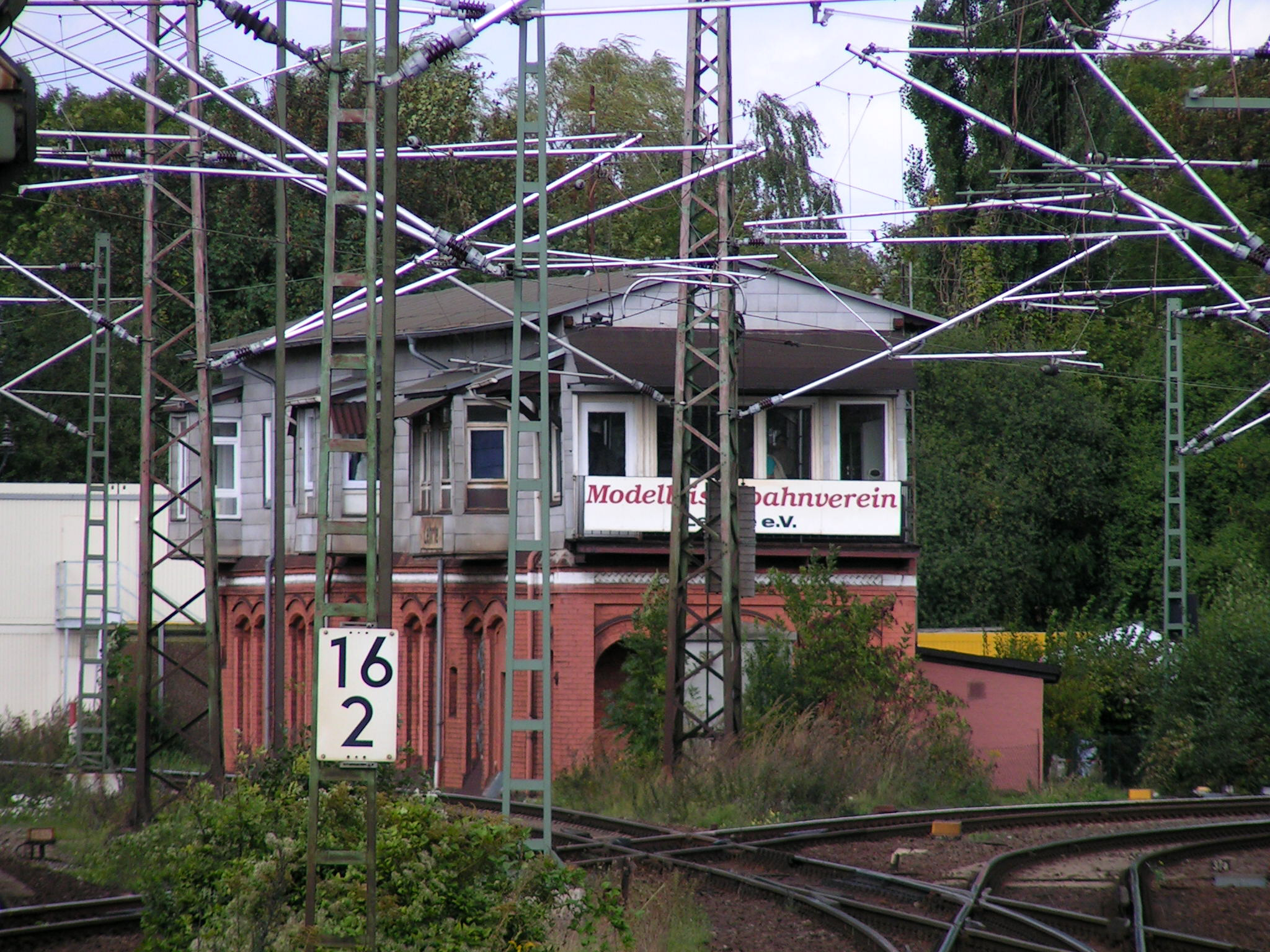
Old signal box in Lehrte

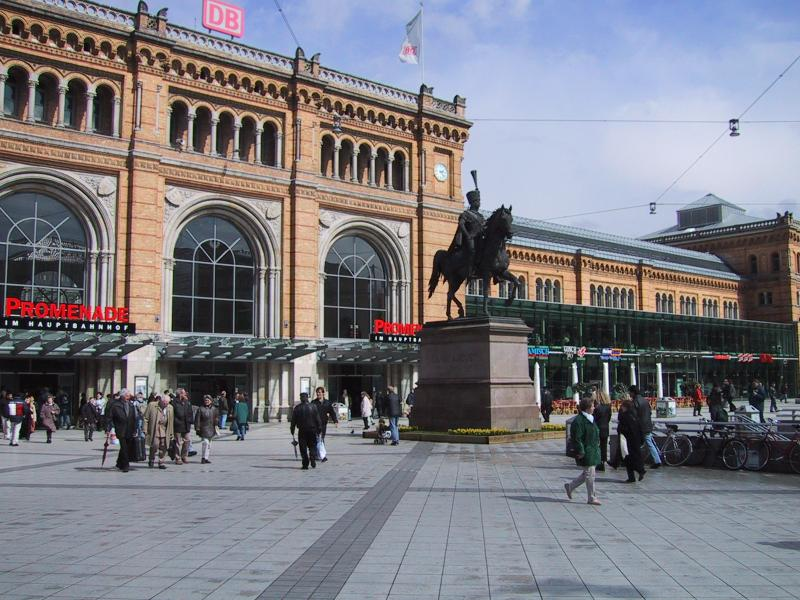
Current Hanover Hauptbahnhof

=== Hanover and Brunswick era ===
The Duchy of Brunswick opened its first railway line early. At the instigation of the then Minister of Finance and Head of the Brunswick State Bank, Philipp August von Amsberg, the section from Brunswick to Wolfenbüttel was already opened in 1838. This forms part of what is now the Brunswick–Bad Harzburg railway, the first government-owned railway in Germany. Both Brunswick and Prussia put pressure on the Kingdom of Hanover to allow an east-west rail link. The King of Hanover was still opposed. It was only when he had participated in a trial run on the Brunswick line that he agreed in 1841 to a railway being built to his capital. A treaty was concluded with Prussia and Brunswick that provided for a connection between Minden in the Prussian Province of Westphalia through Hanover to Brunswick. It would then connect from Brunswick to Wolfenbüttel by the line opened in 1843 and then branch east to Oschersleben and Magdeburg. However, opposition to railways in Hanover still meant that the Royal Hanoverian State Railways were required to build a small station in Hanover and to set up its operation centre at its first railway junction in Lehrte. Construction began in 1842 and on 22 October 1843 the line opened from Hanover to Lehrte. On 3 December it was extended to Peine and from 19 May 1844 it operated regularly to Brunswick.

The line included Brunswick's second station (opened only nine years after the first railway had opened in Germany), but it was also built as a terminal station. This impeded the flow of traffic until 1960.

The network then developed quickly. In 1845 the Lehrte–Celle line opened and that was followed by the Lehrte–Hildesheim line in 1846. Since they are perpendicular to the Brunswick line, the lines are referred to as the Kreuzbahn (German for "cross railway"). In 1847 Celle–Harburg line was opened, followed five months later by the Hanover–Minden line, connecting to Cologne, creating the first rail connection between Berlin and Cologne. Also opened in 1847 was the Bremen–Hanover line. In 1853 the Hanoverian Southern Railway to Kassel was opened as the first line built from a branch in Hanover.

=== From 1870 ===
The Berlin–Lehrte line, which bypassed the junction at Brunswick, opened in 1871 and it captured the fast traffic to and from Berlin. The rapid increase of traffic generally, however, meant that the connection to Brunswick also became more heavily used. From 1876 to 1879, the current Hanover Hauptbahnhof was built because the old one was overloaded.

In the first decade of the 20th century fundamental changes were made to railway facilities in Hanover. In 1906 the line between Tiergarten and Lehrte was moved south bypassing the old Misburg station. The old route became part of a new rail freight bypass opened in 1909. Rail infrastructure in Lehrte has developed considerably. A connecting curve now also runs from Hanover to Hamburg avoiding the need to reverse in Lehrte. This was used for passenger trains between Hannover and Hamburg until the opening of the direct "Hare Railway" between Langenhagen (north of Hanover) and Celle in 1938 and its duplication and electrification in 1965.

=== 1950s to today ===
On 1 October 1960, the current Brunswick Hauptbahnhof replaced the old terminal station. In addition, the Hanover Hauptbahnhof was rebuilt in the 1970s for the construction of the Hanover Stadtbahn, the lines of which pass under the main railway station. In the 1973 Federal Transport Infrastructure Plan, the Dortmund–Hannover–Brunswick line was nominated as a railway to be upgraded for high speeds. In 1976, electrical services on the line commenced. In 1990, the connection to the Hildesheim line was rebuilt to the west of Lehrte. In the mid 1990s the Hanover–Lehrte section of the line was upgraded as part of the development of the Hanover–Berlin high-speed line.

The Hanover S-Bahn was opened for Expo 2000. Between Hanover and Lehrte an additional line was built north of the existing tracks, single track from Hanover station until shortly before Karl-Wiechert-Allee station, then two tracks until just before Ahlten station and then single track to Lehrte. In 1998 it was commissioned. The historic rail platforms in Hannover-Kleefeld and Anderten-Misburg were demolished leaving only platforms facing the S-Bahn tracks (except in the case of Karl-Wiechert-Allee station for trains bound for Hannover). Tiergarten junction (which was previously little used) was closed along with the original route of the line through the former Tiergarten and Misburg stations.

By the summer of 2008, the junction in Lehrte was changed again to allow freight trains from the Hannover freight bypass and the line from Celle to run towards Hildesheim and Brunswick, with the tracks of the high-speed line to Berlin running underneath. As a result, the long-distance trains from Wolfsburg and Brunswick can now pass through Lehrte junction at 120 km/h.

== Current operations ==
The full-length of the line is served hourly by InterCity trains between Leipzig and Hanover, continuing to Oldenburg and Cologne as well as Regional-Express trains on the Brunswick–Hanover–Rheine/Bielefeld route. Trains running west of Lehrte include Intercity-Express trains from Berlin and S-Bahn trains on lines S6 (Celle–Hanover), S7 (Celle–Lehrte–Hanover) and S3 (Hildesheim–Lehrte–Hannover).

On the route east of Lehrte there is heavy freight traffic, including trains of up to 6000 tons between the Port of Hamburg, Groß Gleidingen and Salzgitter Steelworks, which are the heaviest trains in Germany.

The route is electrified and can be operated at up to 140 km/h.
