= HVDC Lehrte–Misburg =

HVDC transmission line in Germany

HVDC Lehrte–Misburg was an experimental high-voltage direct current transmission line between Hannover-Misburg and Lehrte-Ahlten substation. It was designed by Erwin Otto Marx and served to assess the reliability of its components in continuous service, namely the converters which were based on arc discharges in air in contrast to other projects which use mercury vapour rectifiers. At this time, PreussenElektra had installed a second cable between their transformer stations near Lehrte and Misburg. This was used for the experiments which initially only ran for a few hours at night time due to the requirements for a steady supply of electrical power, and which were extended to two or three days in 1944. The plant went into service in 1942 and was designed for the transmission of up to 16 MW at a voltage of 80 kV. The experiments were conducted at a voltage of 75 kV, and a power of 6 to 7 MW on average and 12 MW at maximum was transmitted. They ceased after the Misburg transformer station suffered bomb damage on 18 June 1944. The setup was dismantled after World War II.
