= Royal Hanoverian State Railways =

The Royal Hanoverian State Railways (German: Königlich Hannöversche Staatseisenbahnen) existed from 1843 until the annexation of the Kingdom of Hanover by the Kingdom of Prussia in 1866. At that time its railway network, which comprised 800 kilometres of track, went over to the Prussian state.

== Construction phases and routes ==
=== The Kreuzbahn ===
The concept of the Kreuzbahn arose from the desire of Ernest Augustus, King of Hanover, to avoid having a central railway station in Hanover. The routes therefore ran into the district of Lehrte in the form of a cross (hence Kreuzbahn = cross railway) and, as a result, Lehrte developed into an important railway hub.

The government of the Kingdom of Hanover had initially taken over the construction of state railways, because no private sponsors could be found for the first railway lines that were planned. These were the routes:

- Hanover via Lehrte to Peine on the border with the Duchy of Brunswick
- Lehrte to Celle
- Lehrte to Hildesheim

The first line, a 16 kilometre stretch from Hanover via Misburg to Lehrte, was opened on 22 October 1843. Its extension towards Brunswick followed on 1 December 1843 as far as the state border at Peine; there on 19 May 1844 it was joined to the Duchy of Brunswick State Railway that owned almost a third of the now 60 kilometre long connexion between the two residenz cities. On 15 October 1845 the Lehrte–Celle line followed and on 12 June 1846 the Lehrte–Hildesheim line was finally completed.

From the Kreuzbahn the following additional lines were built under the direction of the Royal Hanoverian Railway which was founded on 13 March 1843:

The Celle–Harburg line via Uelzen and Lüneburg was opened on 1 May 1847, and on 15 October 1847 the Hannover–Minden line followed with its connexion to the main line operated by the Cologne–Minden Railway Company.

=== Bremen Railway ===
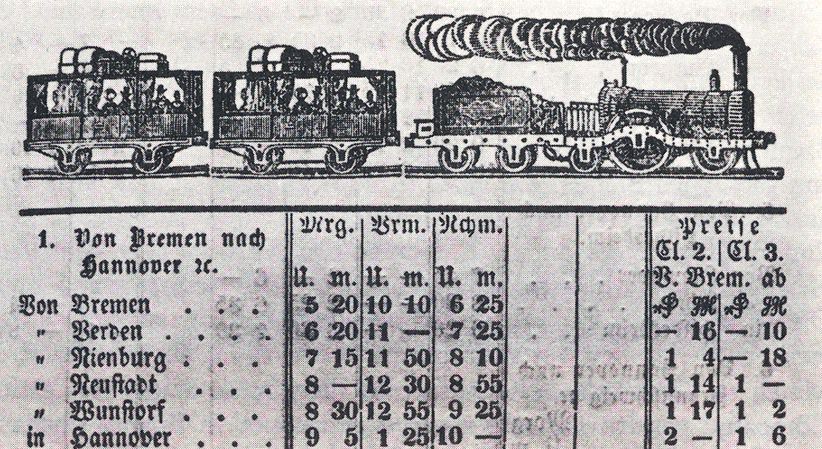
Timetable for the railway service from Bremen to Hanover from 1854

Against the wishes of Prussia the line to Bremen, which was jointly funded with the state of Bremen, was not constructed directly from Minden, but from Hanoverian Wunstorf. On 12 December 1847 the Wunstorf–Bremen section was opened. As a result of the political events of 1848/49 (March revolutions), further expansion of the railway network in the Kingdom of Hanover was delayed.

=== Hanoverian Southern Railway ===
- 1 May 1853: Hannover–Alfeld
- 15 September 1853: Nordstemmen–Hildesheim link
- 31 July 1854: Alfeld–Kreiensen–Göttingen extension
- 8 May 1856: Göttingen–Hanoverian Münden (including the Dransfelder Rampe)
- 23 September 1856: Hanoverian Münden–Kassel

=== Hanoverian Western Railway ===
The project, jointly agreed with Prussia, for a railway from Löhne to the Cologne-Minden Railway Company network via Osnabrück to Emden did not come to fruition until there had been protracted discussions about the course of the line and its connexion to the Dutch railway network.

In the end they agreed upon the present-day route from von Löhne via Osnabrück to Prussian Rheine, that at the same time provided a junction at Münster to the Royal Westphalian Railway Company (Königlich-Westfälische Eisenbahn-Gesellschaft) and from there a link via Salzbergen to Leer and Emden.

The link to the Dutch railway network was achieved from Hanoverian Salzbergen through Bentheim to Oldenzaal. On 24 November 1854 the first section, Emden–Papenburg, was completed.

- 21. November 1855: Löhne–Osnabrück opened
- 19./20. Juni 1856: Entire route via Rheine to Emden completed
- 18. November 1865: Salzbergen–Oldenzaal

=== Bremen–Bremerhaven railway ===
On 23 January 1862 the extension of the Bremen line to Geestemünde/Wesermünde (today Bremerhaven) was effected, again in conjunction with the city of Bremen.

=== Elbe train ferry ===
On 15 March 1864 after lengthy negotiations the line along the river Elbe from Lüneburg to Hohnstorf was finally built and, at the same time the Lauenburg-Hohnstorf Elbe Ferry Company was formed and they established a ferry to connect with the Berlin-Hamburg Railway Company's Lauenburg–Büchen line on the other side of the Elbe.

=== Harz ===
The Vienenburg–Goslar railway was also owned by the Hanoverian State Railways, although it was operated by the Duchy of Brunswick State Railway. The Göttingen–Arenshausen and Northeim–Ellrich lines were not completed until after the transfer of the Hanoverian State Railways to Prussia after the War of 1866.

== Transfer of the state railway to Prussia ==
On 15 December 1866 the Royal Hanoverian State Railways was merged into the Prussian state railways and renamed as the Prussian railway division of Hanover.

== Sources ==
- Bundesbahndirektion Hannover (ed.): 1843–1983. 140 Jahre Eisenbahndirektion Hannover, Hanover (1983)
- Meschkat-Peters, Sabine: Eisenbahnen und Eisenbahnindustrie in Hannover 1835 – 1914, Hanover 2001 (Quellen und Darstellungen zur Geschichte Niedersachsens, vol. 119)

== See also ==
- Kingdom of Hanover
