= Lehrte–Celle railway =

Railway line in Germany

Overview
- Line number: 1720
- Locale: Lower Saxony, Germany

Service
- Route number: 363.3

Technical
- Line length: 28 km (17 mi)
- Track gauge: 1,435 mm (4 ft 8 1/2 in) standard gauge
- Electrification: 15 kV/16.7 Hz AC overhead catenary
- Operating speed: 140 km/h (87.0 mph) (max)

The Lehrte–Celle railway is a main line in the east of Hanover Region in Germany. It links the railway hub of Lehrte with the town of Celle, where it connects to the present-day Hanover–Hamburg railway. Until the opening of the "Hare Railway" (Hasenbahn) from Langenhagen to Celle on 15 May 1938 and its upgrade to double tracks in 1964 and electrification in 1965 it was itself part of this long-distance route. Today it serves the north-south goods trains and is also used by the S 6 and S 7 trains of the Hanover S-Bahn from Hanover to Celle.

The line was planned as the northern branch of the so-called "Kreuzbahn" of the Royal Hanoverian State Railways together with the Hanover–Brunswick and Lehrte–Hildesheim railways and opened on 15 October 1845. On 1 May 1847 it was extended to (then Hanoverian) Harburg. The approach to Lehrte station from the west made it necessary for all trains from Hanover to Celle to reverse in Lehrte. With the construction of the Hanover freight bypass line a direct link to the Hanover–Brunswick railway was made and it was opened on 1 May 1906. This enabled the passenger station at Lehrte to be bypassed. On 6 April 1965 the line was electrified. For the Hanover S-Bahn the platforms on this line were raised to a height of 76 cm and modernised in early 2000.

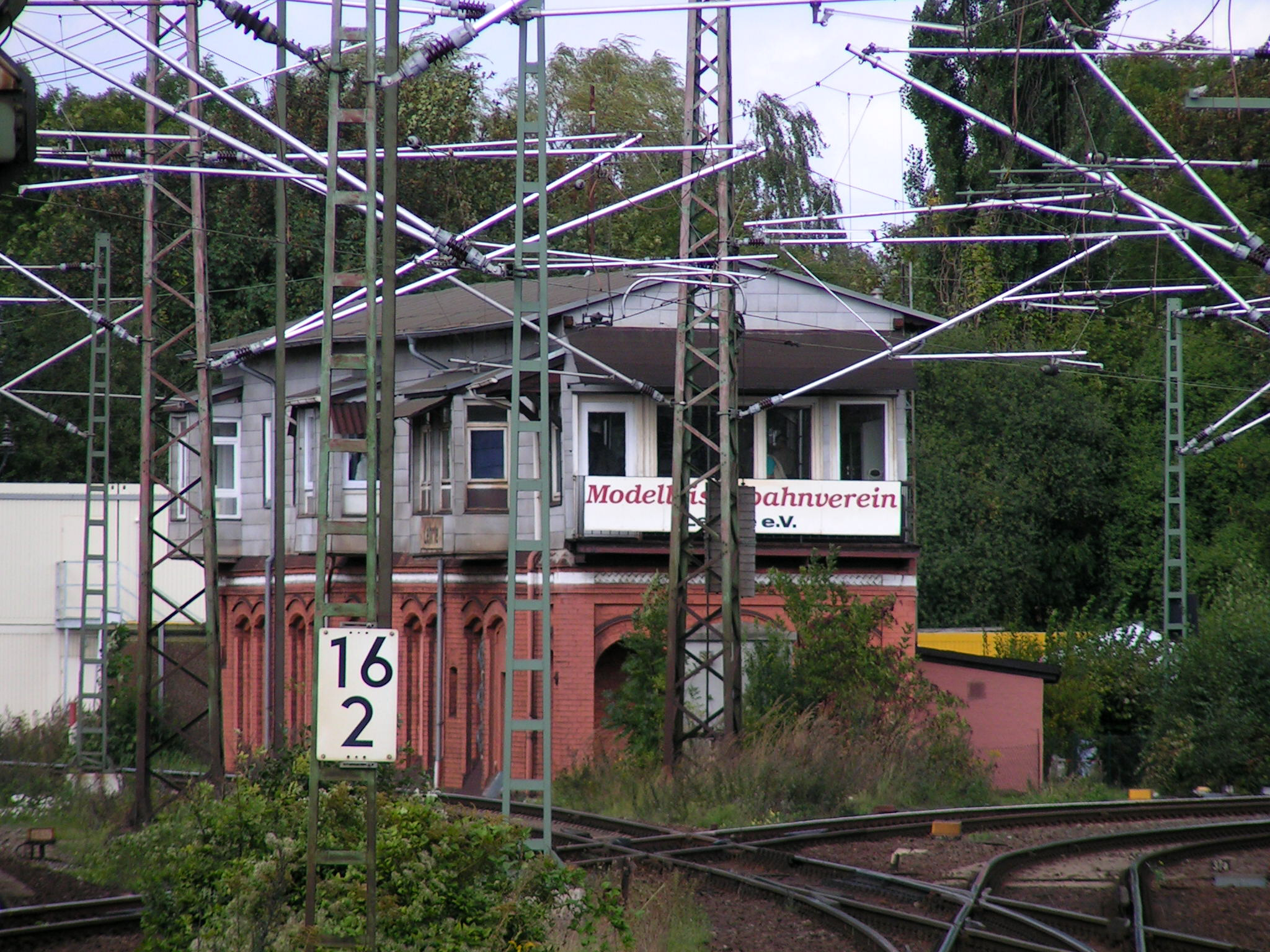
Beginning of the line in Lehrte. Right: the Celle line, left: the Hanover line
