= Lehrte–Nordstemmen railway =

Railway line in Germany

Overview
- Line number: 1770
- Locale: Lower Saxony

Service
- Route number: 323, 363.3

Technical
- Line length: 27 km (17 mi)
- Track gauge: 1,435 mm (4 ft 8 1/2 in) standard gauge
- Electrification: 15 kV/16.7 Hz AC catenary
- Operating speed: 140 km/h (87 mph) (maximum)

The Lehrte–Nordstemmen railway is a continuous double track, electrified main line railway in the German state of Lower Saxony. It connects the railway junction of Lehrte with Hildesheim and Nordstemmen, where it connects with the Hanoverian Southern Railway. The section from Lehrte to Hildesheim opened in 1842 and is one of the oldest lines in Germany.

== History ==
The Lehrte–Hildesheim line was the southern branch of the cross railway built by the Royal Hanoverian State Railways (German: Königlich Hannöverschen Staatseisenbahnen), along with the east-west arms (the Hanover–Brunswick line) and the northern arm (the Lehrte–Celle line). It was opened on 12 July 1846. The previously insignificant town of Lehrte became a railway junction, as a result of the scepticism of King Ernst August concerning railways and his opposition to substantial railway facilities in the city of Hanover.

His son George V was more supportive of railways. In 1853 the first section of the Hanoverian Southern Railway opened from Hanover to Alfeld. A connecting line was opened on 15 September 1853 from Hildesheim to Nordstemmen station adjacent to the Southern Railway. This originally single-track line was duplicated in 1875 by the Hanover-Altenbeken Railway Company (German: Hannover-Altenbekener Eisenbahn-Gesellschaft) as part of a project to continue its Elze–Löhne railway to the east through Hildesheim to Vienenburg.

After the Hanoverian Southern Railway was extended to Kassel in 1856, it was possible to operate from Harburg through Celle, Lehrte and Hildesheim to Kassel and Frankfurt. This line was mainly used by freight trains; passenger trains went through Hanover. The opening of the Hannover freight rail bypass in 1909 made the Southern Railway available for freight traffic to the south.

The Lehrte–Hildesheim line also encouraged the opening of several potash mines.

The Nordstemmen–Lehrte line was electrified on 29 May 1965.

=== Realignment in Lehrte ===
The historic route left Lehrte station just after the platforms and went directly south. The station was handicapped by a level crossing affecting north-south and east-west traffic. Therefore, in 1990 the line from Hildesheim between Lehrte and Sehnde was moved well to the east, now leaving from a new junction with the lines from Brunswick and Wolfsburg. As a result, the Lehrte-Nordstemmen line became longer by about two kilometres. Further development of the node occurred in 2008 at Lehrte with the opening at a grade-separated route for traffic between Celle and Hildesheim, which passes over the passenger tracks between Lehrte and Wolfsburg.

== Route ==
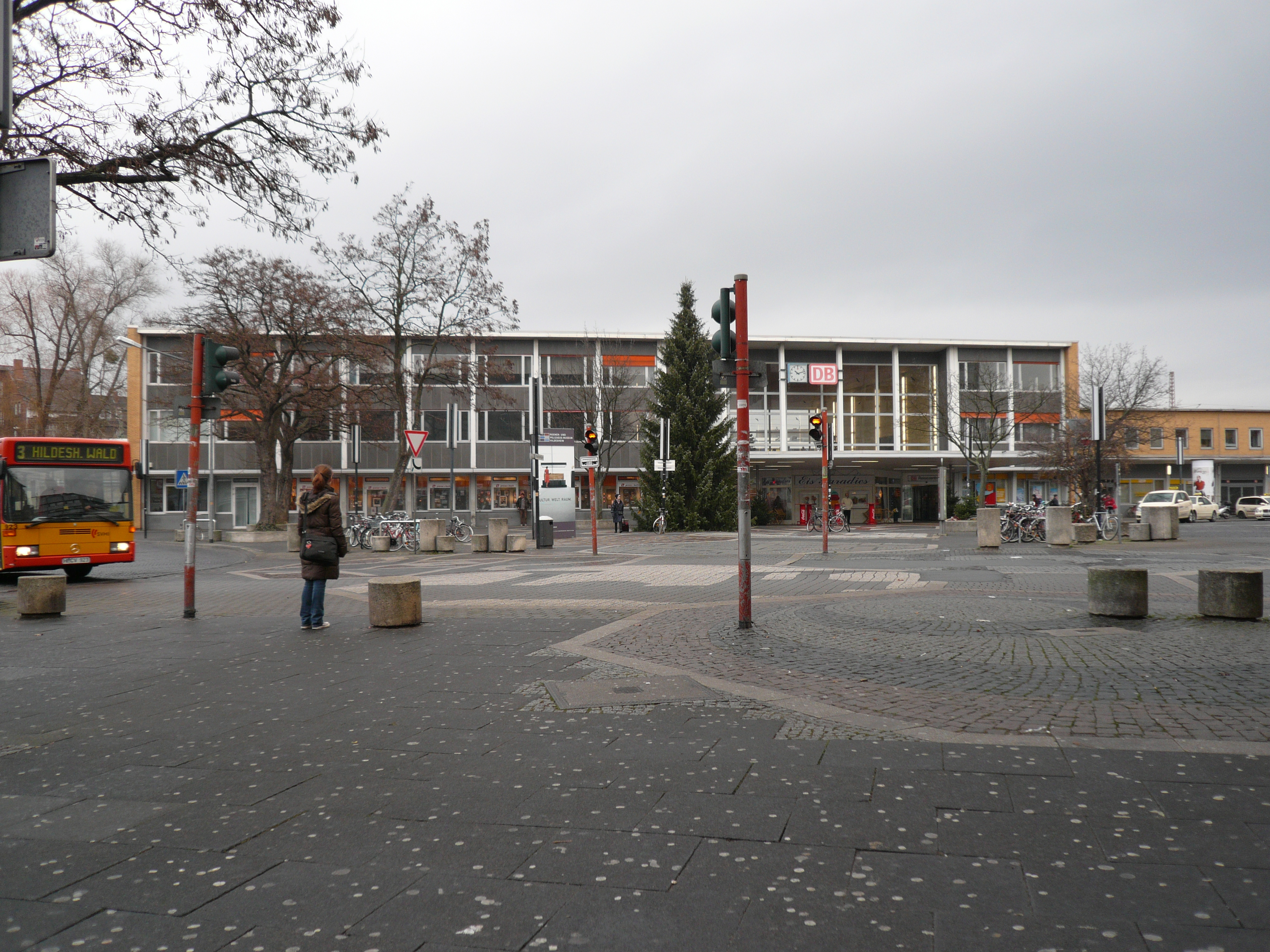
Hildesheim station

The line originally ran in an almost straight line between Lehrte and Hildesheim. Since the early 1990s, it leaves the Hanover-Brunswick line at Lehrte in an easterly direction. It makes a curve of almost 180 degrees to the west and meets the old route south of Lehrte. It then goes south across mostly flat terrain through Sehnde, Algermissen and Harsum, where it approached Hildesheim station from the east. The line then goes due west to Nordstemmen. Since 1991, it has crossed the Hanover–Würzburg high-speed line to which it is connected to and from the south by the Hildesheim loop. Since 1893 at the end of the line there has also been a single-track connecting curve to the north, connecting with the Hanoverian Southern Railway at Barnten station.

== Current operations ==
Since 14 December 2008, Hanover S-Bahn line S3 has operated on the line between Lehrte and Hildesheim and S-Bahn line S4 (from Bennemühlen and Hanover) has operated over the line between Barnten and Hildesheim, in place of the previous Regionalbahn service. This meant that the intermediate stations had to be rebuilt. On the Barnten–Hildesheim route Regional-Express trains also operate to the Harz. On the Nordstemmen–Hildesheim route, Eurobahn trains operate every hour. With the long-distance trains operating over the line between the Hildesheim loop and Hildesheim, this section of this line is well used.
