= Hanover–Berlin high-speed railway =

German high speed railway

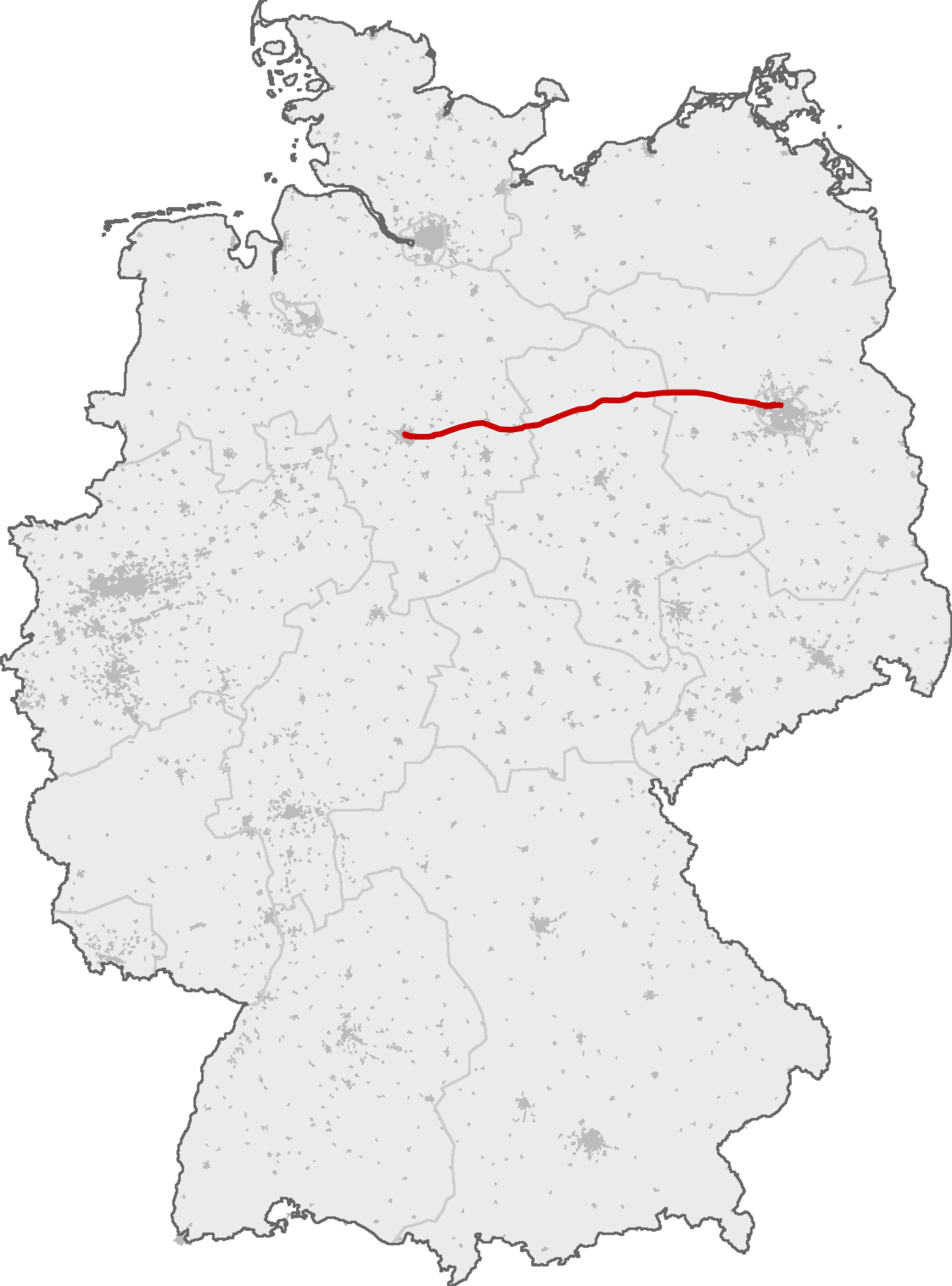

Overview
- Native name: Schnellfahrstrecke Hannover–Berlin
- Line number: 1730 (Hannover–Lehrte); 6107 (Lehrte–Oebisfelde); 6185 (Oebisfelde–Berlin-Spandau); 6109 (Berlin-Spandau–Berlin Ostbf)
- Locale: Lower Saxony, Saxony-Anhalt, Brandenburg, and Berlin, Germany

Service
- Route number: 301; 349

History
- Opened: 15 September 1998

Technical
- Line length: 258 km (160 mi)
- Track gauge: 1,435 mm (4 ft 8 1/2 in) standard gauge
- Electrification: 15 kV/16.7 Hz AC overhead catenary
- Operating speed: Majority: 250 km/h (155 mph); Parts of the line: 200 km/h (125 mph)

The Hanover–Berlin high-speed railway is a 258-kilometre (160 mi) high-speed rail line linking the German cities of Hanover and Berlin.

The Wolfsburg-Berlin section was built as a new line and runs largely parallel to the Lehrter Bahn (the old Berlin-Hanover railway) opened in 1871. The whole line was opened officially on 15 September 1998 and has been in commercial service since 20 September 1998.

The overall Hanover-Berlin project (including the reorganization and upgrading of the Lehrter Bahn) was carried out as German unity rail project no 4 (VDE 4) of the federal transport plan.

== Project ==
The line consists of five sections: upgraded line between Hanover and Lehrte (for operations up to 160 km/h or 100 mph) and between Lehrte and Wolfsburg (200 km/h or 125 mph), the new and upgraded line between Wolfsburg and Oebisfelde (68 km or 42 mi altogether); the 148-kilometre-long (92 mi) new line between Oebisfelde and Staaken (250 km/h or 160 mph) and the connection between Staaken and the Berlin Stadtbahn and Berlin station (60 to 160 km/h or 40 to 100 mph).

Due to its flat profile the line has few structures, apart from a cut-and-cover tunnel under the Elbe Lateral Canal (c. 1975) and four large bridges over the Mittelland Canal, the Elbe, the Havel and the Havel Canal. The line was the first German line which was mostly constructed with slab (ballast-less) track.

== Stations ==
- Berlin Hauptbahnhof
- Berlin-Spandau
- Stendal
- Wolfsburg
- Hannover Hauptbahnhof

== Planning ==
In the 1980s planning began on an improved line for ICE trains for transit traffic (people who were allowed to transit, but did not have a visa to visit East Germany) between West Germany and West Berlin. In September 1988, the governments of West Germany and East Germany began negotiations in relation to the development of the Lehrterbahn for speeds up to 200 km/h (125 mph).

Options available were:

- Northern route via Wolfsburg and Stendal to the old Lehrte railway
- Southern route via Magdeburg and Potsdam to the Berlin-Potsdam-Magdeburg railway

In 1990 the northern route was chosen; it was the shortest and fastest connection between Berlin and Hanover and was used by the long-distance high-speed trains before World War II. The option that was favored had the transit tracks parallel with, but separately from, the existing tracks of the Lehrterbahn, which would remain available for internal East German traffic. The existing line would be used from Wolfsburg to Hanover as an upgraded line. The new and upgraded line was intended for passenger traffic and the original line for goods traffic. At several points the new and original lines were to be interconnected, including Rathenow and Stendal.

On 28 June 1990 the transport ministers of the two still separate Germans States, Horst Gibtner and Friedrich Zimmermann signed an agreement to build a high-speed line along the existing Lehrtebahn, following two years of negotiations.

It was originally planned that the high-speed line would be used by an hourly IC/ICE line between Hanover and/or Braunschweig and Berlin. As a result of the expected increase of traffic due to German reunification four lines had been adopted by 1991:

- Berlin–Hannover–Ruhr Area
- Berlin–Hannover–Bremen
- Berlin–Wolfsburg–Braunschweig–Kassel–Frankfurt
- Berlin–Stendal–Salzwedel–Uelzen–Hamburg

Taking into regional, suburban and freight trains, planning was based on 200 trains each day (in both directions) between Berlin and Stendal for the high-speed and original routes. In consequence, it was decided that the design speed for the high-speed line would be 250 km/h (155 mph), the original line would be developed for a design speed of 160 km/h (100 mph) instead of 120 km/h (75 mph) and earthworks and structures on the largely single-track original route between Staaken and Stendal would make provision for a second track.

== Construction ==
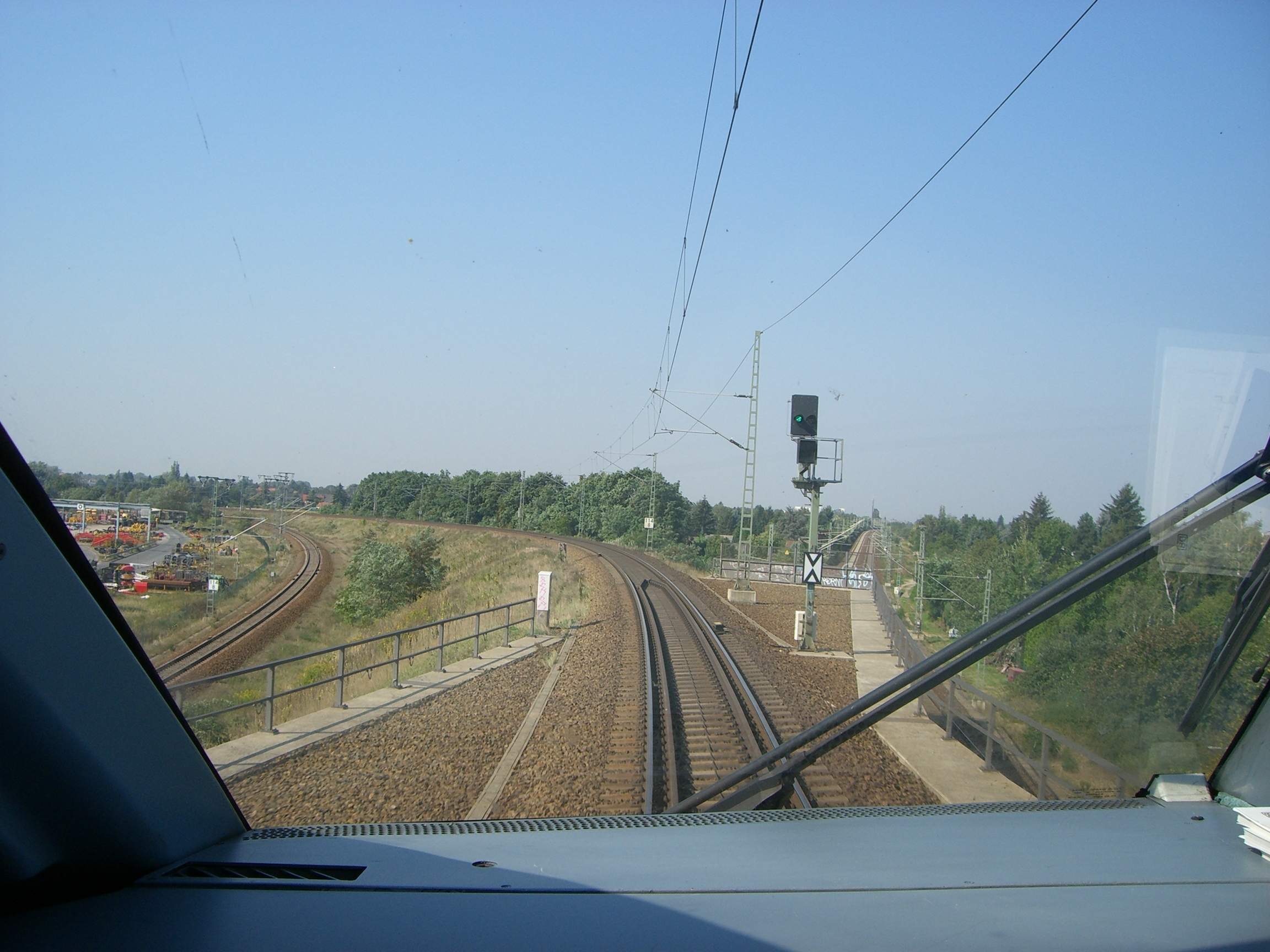
Separation of the high speed line from the Berlin-Hamburg line (right) near Spandau

Building began on 11 November 1992 with the beginning of work on the 812-metre-long (2,664 ft) Elbe bridge at Hämerten. Parallel to the building of the new line, Lehrterbahn was reorganised. At the same time construction commenced at Berlin Spandau long-distance station and on the Weddel loop line, a 21-kilometre-long (13 mi) connection between Fallersleben (near Wolfsburg) and Weddel (near Braunschweig).

The 16.7 Hz traction current line between Oebisfelde and Rathenow, which was brought into service on 14 March 1995, was the first traction current connection established between west and east Germany. The last viaduct was finished in October 1997 with the bridge over the Havel Canal.

During the building phase, archaeologists carried out approximately 4,000 digs in Brandenburg and made discoveries in 30 places, including finds of some objects that were over 1,500 years old.

Numerous test and acceptance runs were made with ICE S trains at up to 331 km/h (206 mph) between April and August 1998. Services commenced on 24 May 1998 on the Vorsfelde-Stendal section. On 15 September 1998 the whole line was officially opened.

In 2005 long-planned changes began on the eastern side of Lehrte station. On 15 January 2007 two new bridges were opened as a flying junction in Lehrte, overcoming congestion at the junction. When work on points is completed in 2008, the running speed of the main line will be raised from 60 to 120 km/h (75 mph). The Federal government plans to invest € 376 million for upgrades between Hanover and Lehrte between 2006 and 2010.

=== Great bustard protection area ===
East of Rathenow, near Buckow, the line runs by the 6,400 ha (16,000-acre) nature reserve of Havelländisches Luch. It is one of the last refuges in Germany for the vulnerable great bustard, one of the heaviest flying birds of the world.

There were extensive discussions until 1995 in relation to measures to protect the birds, including consideration of the building of a 6-kilometre-long (3.7 mi) tunnel for approximately DM one billion. In order not to disturb the birds, this would have required about seven years to build. A cut-and-cover tunnel would have cost DM 500 million. A deviation around the entire area was also examined.

In order to protect the endangered species, for a length of 6 kilometres (3.7 mi), between the 153 and 158 km (95 and 98 mi) marks, 7-metre-high (23 ft) embankments were built to assist the over-flight of the birds, which have quite slow and low take-offs. The cost for this work was DM 35 million. On a 17-kilometre-long (11 mi) section – between the 148.5 and 165.5 km (92.3 and 102.8 mi) marks – the third track of the parallel Lehrterbahn was omitted and trains from it run on the new line. In addition on this section, the overall height of the electrification supply lines is reduced and the maximum speed is reduced to 200 km/h (125 mph). An area of approximately 300 hectares (740 acres) was added to the nature park as compensatory habitat. This work delayed the planned opening from 1997 to 1998.

=== Commencement of operations ===
On 24 May 1998 the Wolfsburg-Oebisfelde-Stendal section of the new line entered service. The whole new line was officially opened on 15 September 1998 by the Chancellor Helmut Kohl, DB boss Johannes Ludewig and Berlin Mayor Eberhard Diepgen. In Berlin Ostbahnhof the opening ICE was officially named the “Claus Graf Stauffenberg”, before it ran to Hanover via Stendal and Wolfsburg as ICE18952.

With the timetable change on 20 September 1998 the travel time between Berlin and Hanover was reduced from four hours and twelve minutes (1990) to one and a half hours; the Berlin-Frankfurt time was reduced to an even four hours. The drastic travel time reduction on the new line led to rising passenger numbers, as a result of the cancellation of the competing air services between Berlin and Hanover.

With the opening of the high-speed line, the two state capitals of Magdeburg and Potsdam lost their ICE connections. As a consequence there were violent protests, which led for some time to the reinstatement of occasional ICEs between Berlin and Wolfsburg on the old line.

== Service ==
Several ICE/IClines run across the line:

- ICE:: Berlin−Hannover−Hamm−Essen−Düsseldorf−Cologne or Hamm−Wuppertal− Cologne. This line is operated hourly by ICE 2 trains that are divided into two trains at Hamm.
- ICE: Berlin−Braunschweig−Kassel−Wilhelmshöhe−Frankfurt− Mannheim−Basel or Mannheim−Stuttgart−Munich. It operates to Mannheim each hour, then alternating every two hours to Basel or Munich. This line also runs over the Hanover-Würzburg high-speed line and uses ICE 1s.
- IC: Berlin− Hannover−Osnabrück−Münster or Osnabrück−Bad Bentheim−Amsterdam every two hours, branching every four hours in Osnabrück.

=== Running speeds ===
The new line is regularly operated between the 178-kilometre-mark (111 mi) of the Lehrterbahn (near Vorsfelde) and the 118-kilometre-mark (73 mi) (near Berlin-Staaken) at 250 km/h (155 mph); in the great bustard protection area (148-to-166 km-marks or 92-to-103 mi) the maximum speed is 200 km/h (125 mph). The upgraded line in the Lehrte–Wolfsburg–Oebisfelde section is designed for 200 km/h (125 mph).

On 13 August 2001 an ICE S ran on the new line at 393 km/h (244 mph). This is the second highest speed that has been achieved so far on German railways.

== See also ==
- High-speed rail in Germany
