= Ahlten =

Coordinates: 52°22′N 9°54′E

- Village
- Ahlten
- Country: Germany
- State: Lower Saxony
- Region: Hanover Region
- City: Lehrte

Population
  - Total: around 5,500
- Time zone: UTC+1 (CET)
  - Summer (DST): UTC+2 (CEST)
- Postal code: 31275
- Dialling code: +49 5132
- ISO 3166 code: DE-NI

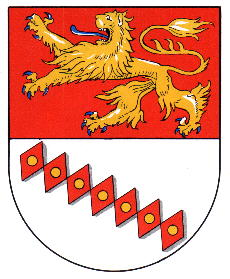
Coat of arms of Ahlten

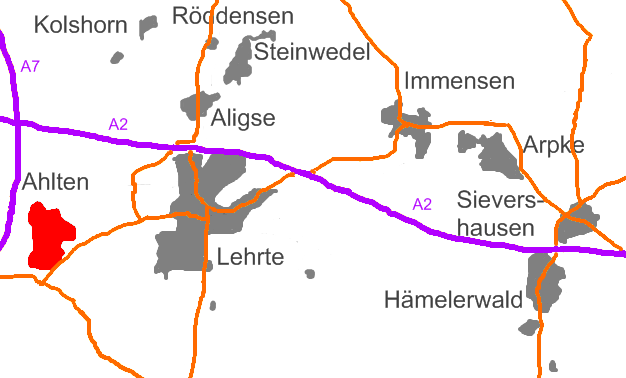
Location of Ahlten in the city of Lehrte

Ahlten is a village in northern Germany with a population of around 5500. It belongs to the administrative district of the city of Lehrte, five kilometres east. Both towns are part of the multitown region "Hanover Region" with its own administration.

Ahlten is 17 km east of the City of Hannover which is the capital town of the federal state "Niedersachsen" (Lower Saxony).

Ahlten is since the 1920s the site of a large substation. From this substation in 1944 an experimental HVDC power line to Misburg was built (Lehrte-Misburg HVDC).
