= Lehrte =

Town in Hanover, Lower Saxony, Germany

- Town
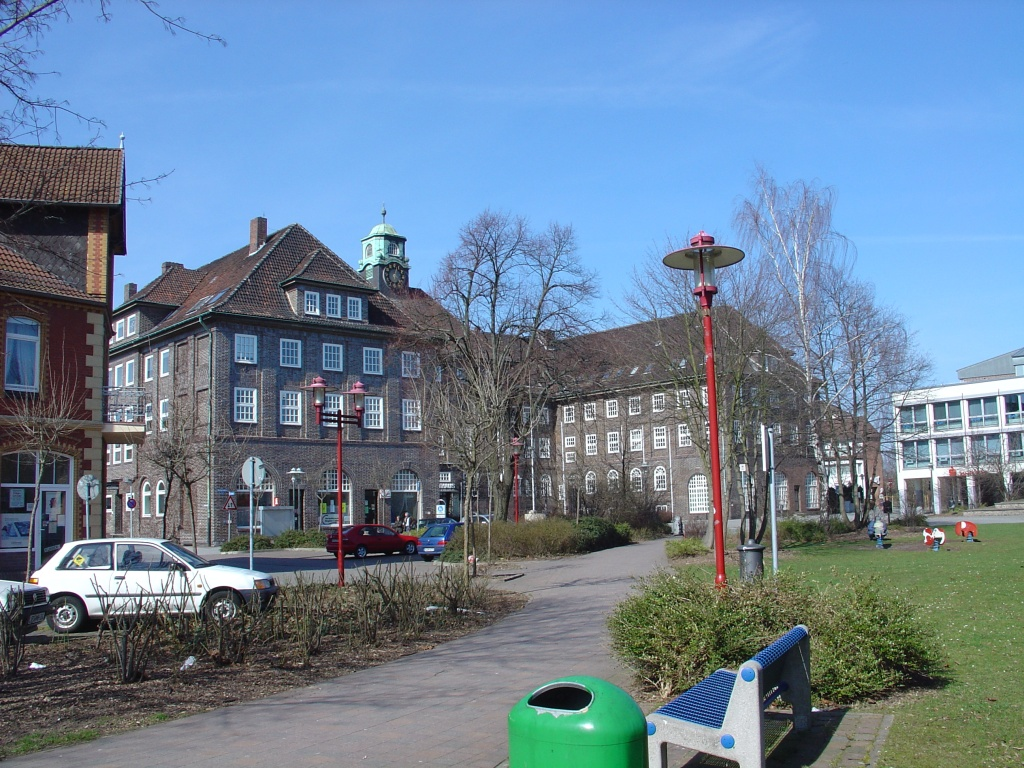
- Town hall

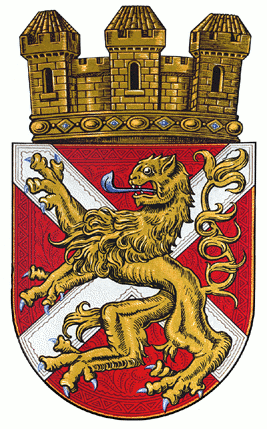
- Coat of arms

- Location of Lehrte within Hanover district
- Interactive map of Lehrte
- Location within Germany Location within Lower Saxony
- Coordinates: 52°22′N 09°58′E
- Country: Germany
- State: Lower Saxony
- District: Hanover

Government
  - Mayor (2019–24): Frank Prüße (CDU)

Area
  - Total: 127.67 km^{2} (49.29 sq mi)
- Elevation: 62 m (203 ft)

Population (2025-12-31)
  - Total: 44,140
  - Density: 345.7/km^{2} (895.4/sq mi)
- Time zone: UTC+01:00 (CET)
  - Summer (DST): UTC+02:00 (CEST)
- Postal codes: 31275
- Dialling codes: 05132
- Vehicle registration: H
- Website: www.lehrte.de

Lehrte (German pronunciation: [ˈleːɐ̯tə]) is a town in the district of Hanover, in Lower Saxony, Germany. It is situated approximately 17 km east of Hanover. In the 19th century Lehrte was the most important railway junction in the former Kingdom of Hanover. As of the 21st century, it has a population of 43,000.

== History ==
The first documented history of the area was in 1147 and shows that, what is now known as Lehrte, was a relatively small farming village. Up to the year 1352, when the church, now known as Nikolauskirche, was built; the local farming residents attended Sunday church services in the village of Steinwedel.

At this time, Lehrte lay in the historical region known as the Großen Freien which literally translates to the big free and lay far from major transit and traffic routes.

== Economy ==
Lehrte lay fairly dormant until 1843, when work began on the Hanover–Brunswick railway, linking Lehrte with both towns. In the following year, work began on building lines to Celle (1845), Hildesheim (1846) and Berlin (1871).

When work on the railway line commenced, Lehrte had 755 inhabitants; 60 years later the population had increased approximately ten times. In 1898 the area of Lehrte was granted municipal rights and formally recognised as a town.

With the railway well and truly established, industry grew within Lehrte, including clay works, a mineral fertilizer works, a cement factory, canned goods and a sugar factory in 1883 which, until 2002, dominated the centre of the town. The cement factory was created in 1881 by Hermann Manske with other limited partners and was the second factory of the cement industry in the Hanover region.

In 1910 the cement factory was shut down. In 1911 a cattle market was established and Lehrte became one of the most important places for cattle trade and shipment in Northern Germany. In 1912, mining began on the potash reserves in the area. The Lehrter Bahnhof (Lehrte Station) in Berlin is named after Lehrte. It was opened in 1871 as the terminus of the line linking Berlin with Lehrte and Hannover, which later became Germany's most important east–west main line.

Since the 1920s, a large substation has existed in Ahlten, which in 1944 was the end of the experimental Lehrte-Misburg HVDC line.

== Twin towns – sister cities ==
Lehrte is twinned with:

- Mönsterås, Sweden
- Staßfurt, Germany
- Trzcianka, Poland
- Vanves, France
- Ypres, Belgium

== Notable people ==
- Heinrich Bokemeyer (1679–1751), musicologist, choirmaster and composer, born in Immensen
- Kurt Hirschfeld (1902–1964), theatre director and dramaturge at the Schauspielhaus Zürich
- Werner Lampe (born 1950), swimmer and Olympic medalist
- Ursula von der Leyen (born 1958), politician (CDU)
- Reinhard Mey (born 1942), singer-songwriter
- Justus Nieschlag (born 1991), triathlete and 2020 Olympian
- Lukas Rieger (born 1999), singer-songwriter
- Gerhard Schröder (born 1944), politician (SPD) and former Chancellor of Germany

== Gallery ==
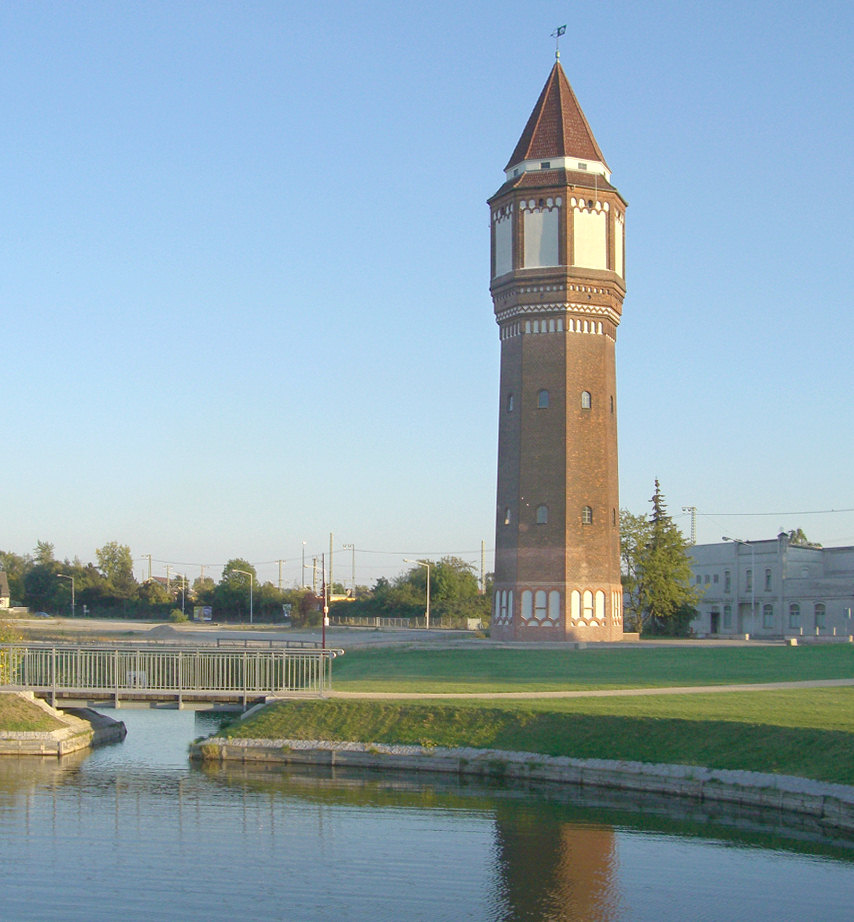
Water tower Lehrter Wasserturm

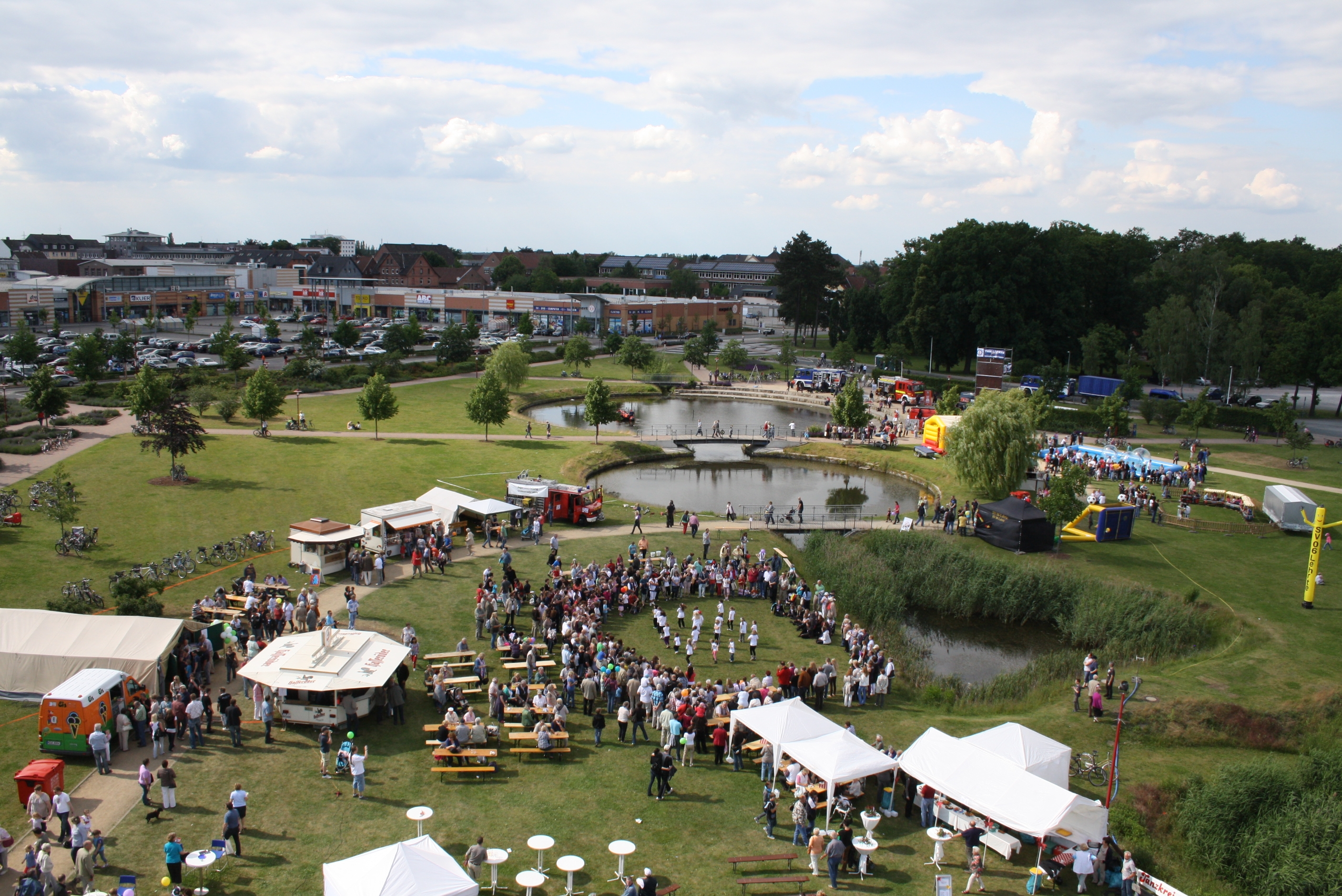
Festival in the Lehrter Stadtpark (2012)

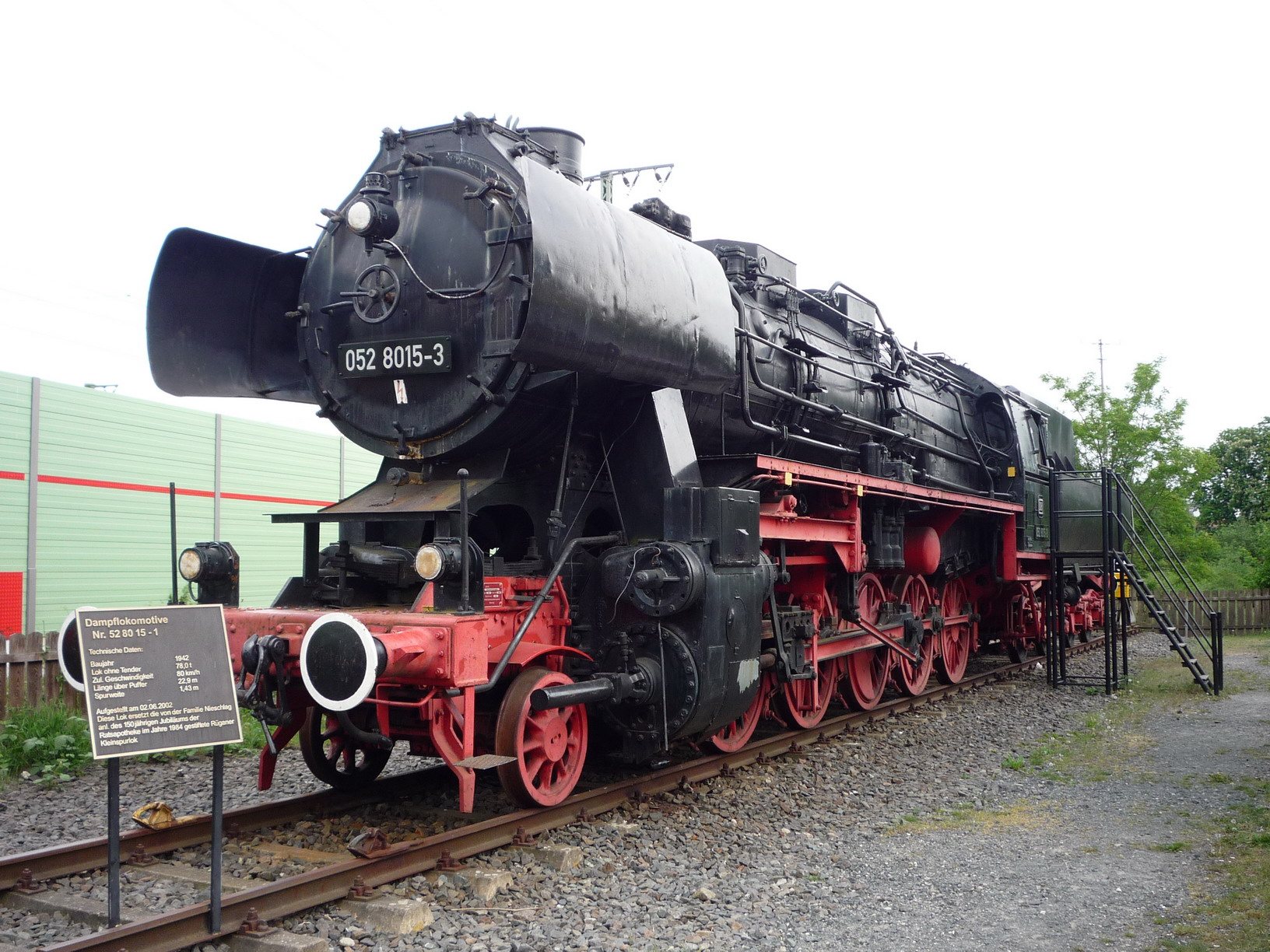
Steam engine Dampflok 052 Lehrte 245-h

== See also ==
- Metropolitan region Hannover-Braunschweig-Göttingen-Wolfsburg
- Battle of Sievershausen
