= Berlin–Lehrte railway =

Major east-west train infrastructure in Germany

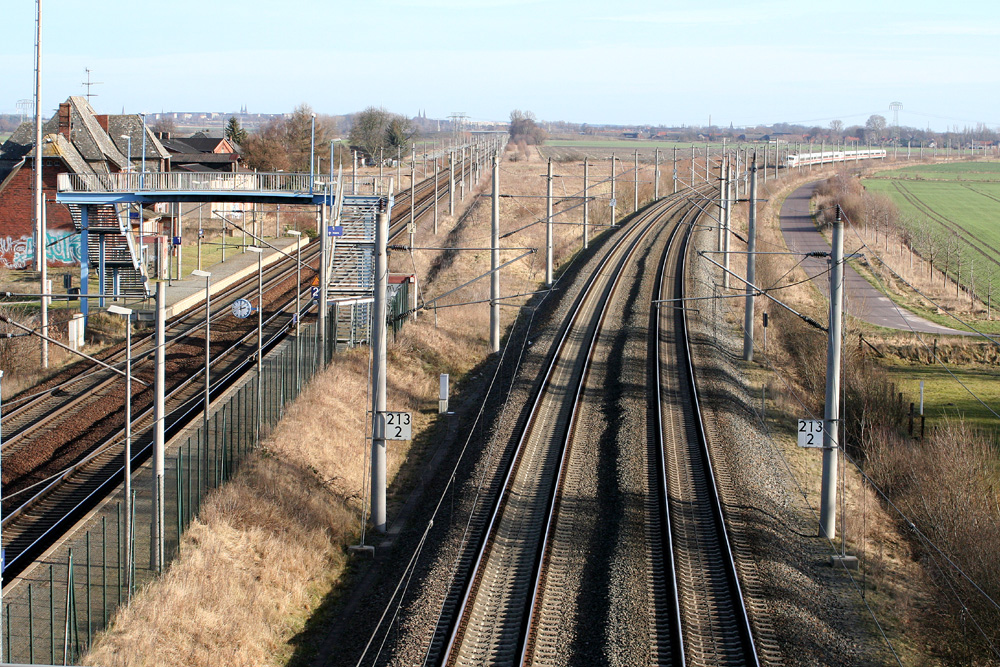
- "Stammbahn" via Stendal (left) and the high-speed line bypassing Stendal (right) at Möhringen

Overview
- Native name: Lehrter Bahn
- Line number: 6107 Berlin Hbf–Lehrte; 6185 HSL from Berlin-Spandau to Oebisfelde; 6399 Oebisfelde–Fallersleben (3 tracks)
- Locale: Lower Saxony, Saxony-Anhalt, Brandenburg, Berlin

Service
- Route number: 204 Berlin–Stendal; 301 Stendal–Wolfsburg; 300 Wolfsburg–Lehrte; 349

Technical
- Line length: 239.3 km (148.7 mi)
- Number of tracks: 1–3; 2, combined with HSL (Bamme junction–Ribbeck junction)
- Track gauge: 1,435 mm (4 ft 8 1/2 in) standard gauge
- Electrification: 15 kV/16.7 Hz AC; Overhead catenary (partly)
- Operating speed: 200 km/h (120 mph) (maximum)
Route map
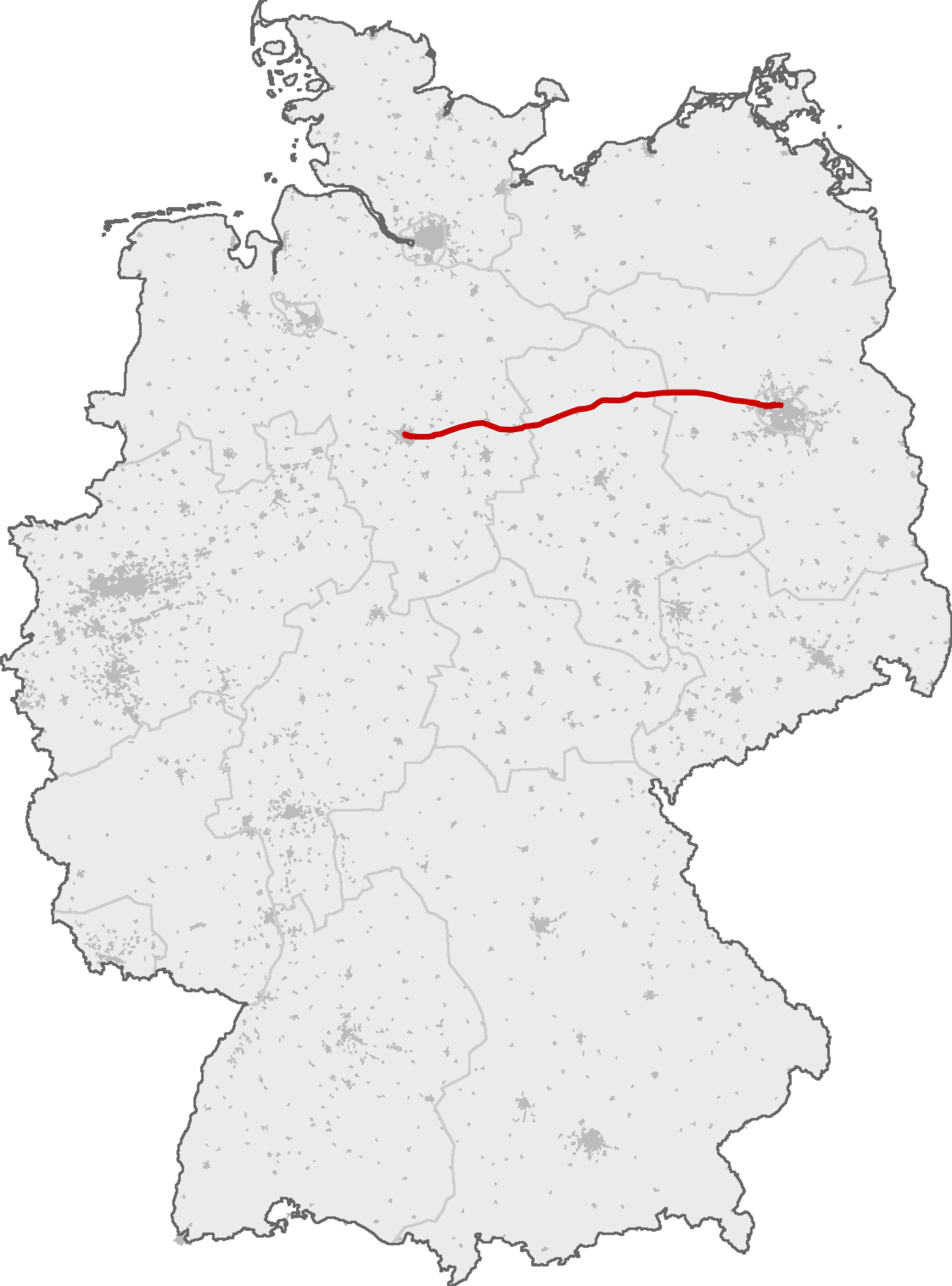
- Source: German railway atlas

The Berlin–Lehrte railway, known in German as the Lehrter Bahn (Lehrte Railway), is an east–west line running from Berlin via Lehrte to Hanover. Its period as a separate railway extended from its opening in 1871 to the nationalisation of its owner, the Magdeburg-Halberstadt Railway Company on 1 July 1886. The company's Berlin station, the Lehrter Bahnhof was finally torn down in 1958.

The 239 km-long (149 mi) route, which is still open, runs from Berlin Hauptbahnhof in a westerly direction to Spandau. From there it runs through Rathenow, Stendal, Oebisfelde, Wolfsburg and Gifhorn to Lehrte, where it connects with the Hanover–Brunswick line to Hanover.

The Lehrte railway has a maximum speed of 200 km/h on the busy line between Hanover and Oebisfelde, which forms part of the Hanover–Berlin high-speed line. Between Oebisfelde and Berlin, the new line runs largely parallel with the Lehrte line. The Lehrte line is mostly unelectrified between Wustermark in the western of the suburbs of Berlin and Vorsfelde, near Wolfsburg, as long-distance passenger services use the new line.

== History ==
In 1867, Adolph von Hansemann's Magdeburg-Halberstadt Railway Company (German: Magdeburg-Halberstädter Eisenbahngesellschaft, MHE) obtained the concession for the construction of this line, and a branch from Stendal via Salzwedel to Uelzen, the so-called America Line. The route would reduce the distance between Berlin, Hanover and the Rhine Province compared to the already existing line via Potsdam, Magdeburg and Brunswick. It went into service in the following stages:

- 15 March 1870: Stendal–Salzwedel
- 1 February 1871: Gardelegen–Stendal–Spandau
- 15 July 1871: Spandau–Berlin
- 1 November 1871: Lehrte–Gardelegen for freight; 1 December 1871 for passengers

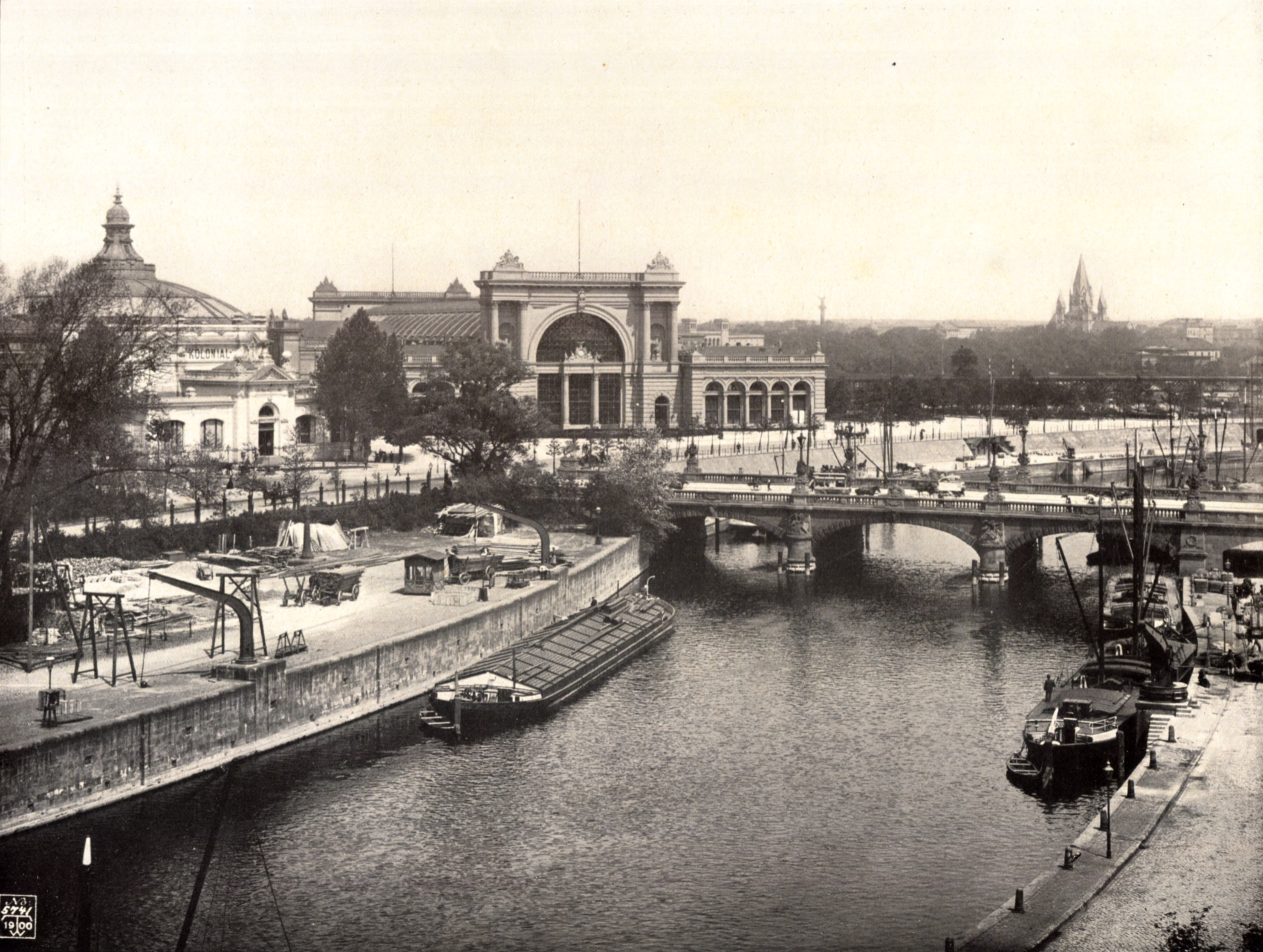
Lehrte Station and Moltke Bridge in 1900

The government of Prussia bought the MHE in December 1879 and thus acquired the Berlin–Lehrte railway and it became part of the Prussian state railways. From 1884 the operations in Berlin of the Lehrte Railway were united structurally and operationally more and more with the nearby Hamburg Railway. This was accompanied by the separation of passenger and freight transport in Berlin with the building of the relief line between Wustermark and Nauen, the construction and refurbishment of the Spandau station and the opening of the Wustermark marshalling yard completed before the First World War.

The railway line became increasingly important for passenger and freight transport between Berlin and Hanover, the Ruhr and Bremen. With the division of Germany after the Second World War, the line lost most of its long-distance passenger trains. Because of the need to make reparations, the rail networks in the Soviet occupation zone were reduced to a minimum, partly due to strange, time-consuming operating procedures for rail movements that resulted. In Berlin, the remaining traffic was concentrated on other routes and stations, so that Berlin's Lehrte station ceased operation in 1952. In 1974 a 970 m-long (3,180 ft) cut and cover tunnel was completed under the newly constructed Elbe Lateral Canal.

Starting in 1976 the line between Wustermark and Berlin began to be used for transit trains between Berlin and Hamburg. New passport inspection facilities were set up in Berlin-Staaken station. After German reunification in 1991, long-distance trains from Berlin to Hanover returned to the line.

== High-speed ==
In the 1980s, planning was untaken on upgrading the Lehrte railway for high-speed transit traffic between West Germany and West Berlin. It was planned to build a new track parallel with the Lehrte railway for transit traffic, with the existing tracks used for the domestic services within the German Democratic Republic. This plan is reflected in the line as built with the old railway, which is still largely not electrified, being used for regional services.

== Connection of the Hamburg and Berlin Lehrte railways ==
The first connection to the new Berlin Ringbahn was built in 1879 when a connection was built in Fürstenbrunn to the Charlottenburg-Westend freight yard (now Westend). This connection was further developed in 1882 to create a link for passenger trains between the Lehrte railway and the Berlin Stadtbahn to connect with Charlottenburg station. For the same purpose a connection was also built in 1882 between the Hamburg railway and the Stadtbahn between Ruhleben and Charlottenburg station.

With the nationalisation of the Hamburg railway in 1884, its operation was further integrated with the Lehrte railway in Berlin and Spandau:

- Transfer of Hamburg passenger services to Berlin's Lehrte station and closure of the Hamburger Bahnhof in October 1884
- Merger of their goods yards in Berlin in May 1893
- Restructuring between 1888 and 1892 of the two companies' stations in Spandau, with the station west of the Havel river (formerly Spandau's Lehrte Station, now Spandau station) becoming the freight yard and station east of the Havel (formerly Spandau's Hamburg Station, now Stresow S-Bahn station) becoming the passenger station. In 1885 a freight rail had been built here to create a link between the two lines.
- At the same time, the two pairs of tracks between Berlin and Spandau were rearranged to operate as passenger-only and freight-only tracks, with the Lehrte tracks being used for freight trains. As part of development of the Ringbahn with four tracks Moabit station was rebuilt.

Putlitzstraße station opened in 1898 allowed for the first time transfers between trains on the north ring and suburban trains between Spandau and Berlin's Lehrte station. More stations were opened on the Lehrte railway:

- Staaken (1900)
- Fürstenbrunn (1905) for the Siemens workers of Siemensstadt (closed after the West Berlin railworker strike with the Siemens Railway in 1980)
- Jungfernheide (1908)

== Reconstruction of Spandau railway ==
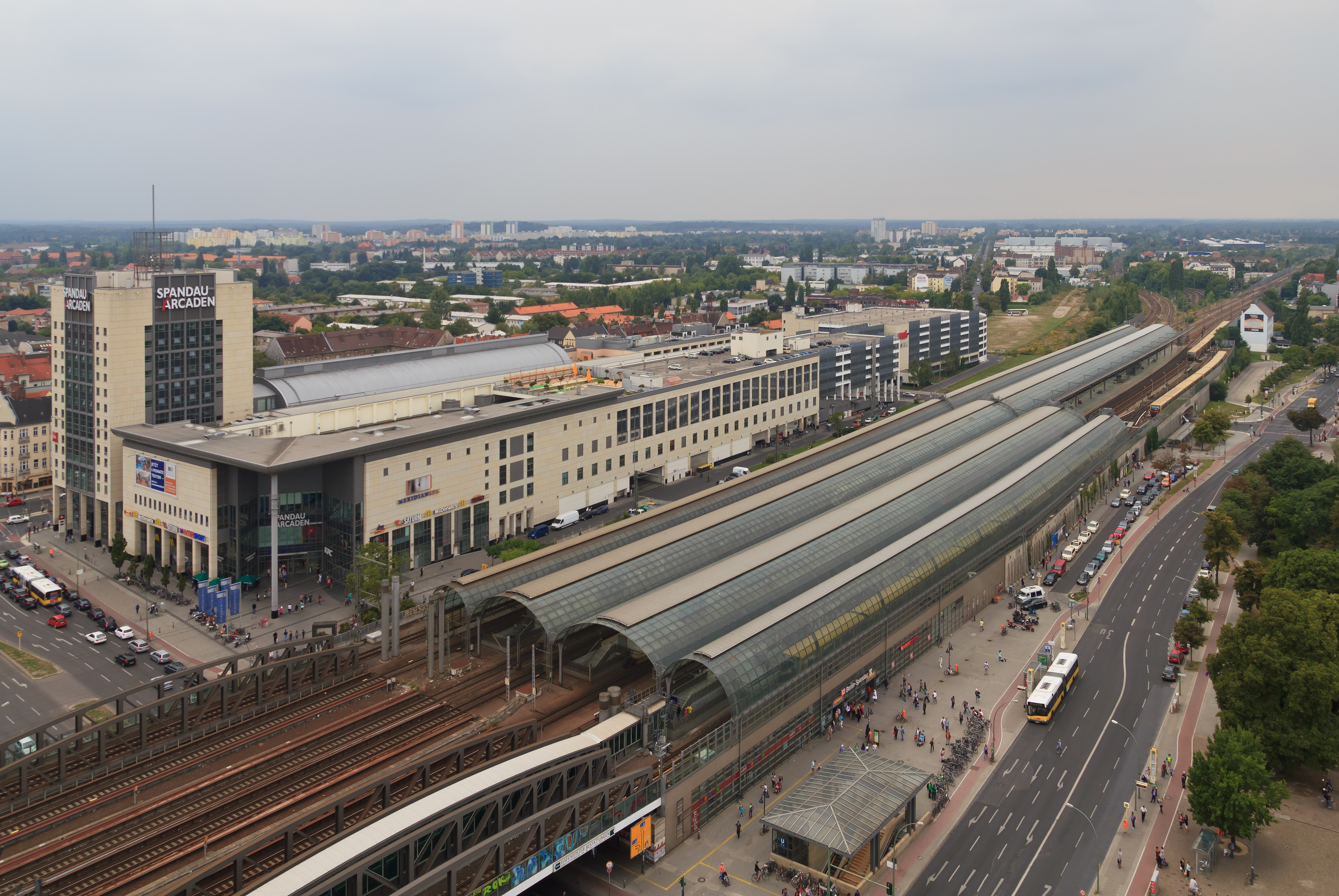
Berlin-Spandau Station

The steadily growth of long-distance, suburban and freight services made necessary the radical transformation of the Spandau railway between 1905 and 1912. It was also necessary to relocate freight services, for which the Berlin railway had become too congested, to outer areas.

Between Ruhleben and the Spandau freight yard the old freight line, originally the route of the Lehrte railway was closed in order to create a new eight or six track railway on an embankment on the alignment of the Hamburg railway. Long-distance passenger, suburban and freight services each gained their own pair of tracks.

West of Spandau goods yard (Spandau West), new passenger train tracks were created in 1908 for the Lehrte railway. As previously, east of Spandau the original tracks of the Lehrte railway were available only for freight. In 1909 Wustermark marshalling yard opened, replacing the Spandau marshalling yard and part of the function of several inner Berlin goods yards. In 1911, the Ruhleben goods yard (east of Spandau) opened to traffic with several connecting routes.

At the same time, in order to cope with the increasing commuter traffic, tracks were built connecting the Berlin Stadtbahn with the new Spandau West suburban station west of the Havel, which was opened in 1910. In 1911 the Spandau suburban line was completed, branching off the connection between the Hamburg line and the Stadtbahn at Heerstraße station and passing through Rennbahn (opened in 1909) and Pichelsberg.

With the relocation of the Stadtbahn link between Heerstraße and Charlottenburg in 1928 to the southwest to make room for the new Exhibition Ground separate tracks were built for long-distance and suburban services between Heerstraße and the Stadtbahn. From August 1928, the electrified S-Bahn services were extended to Spandau.
