= Brake bei Bielefeld station =

Railway station in Germany

Brake (b Bielefeld)
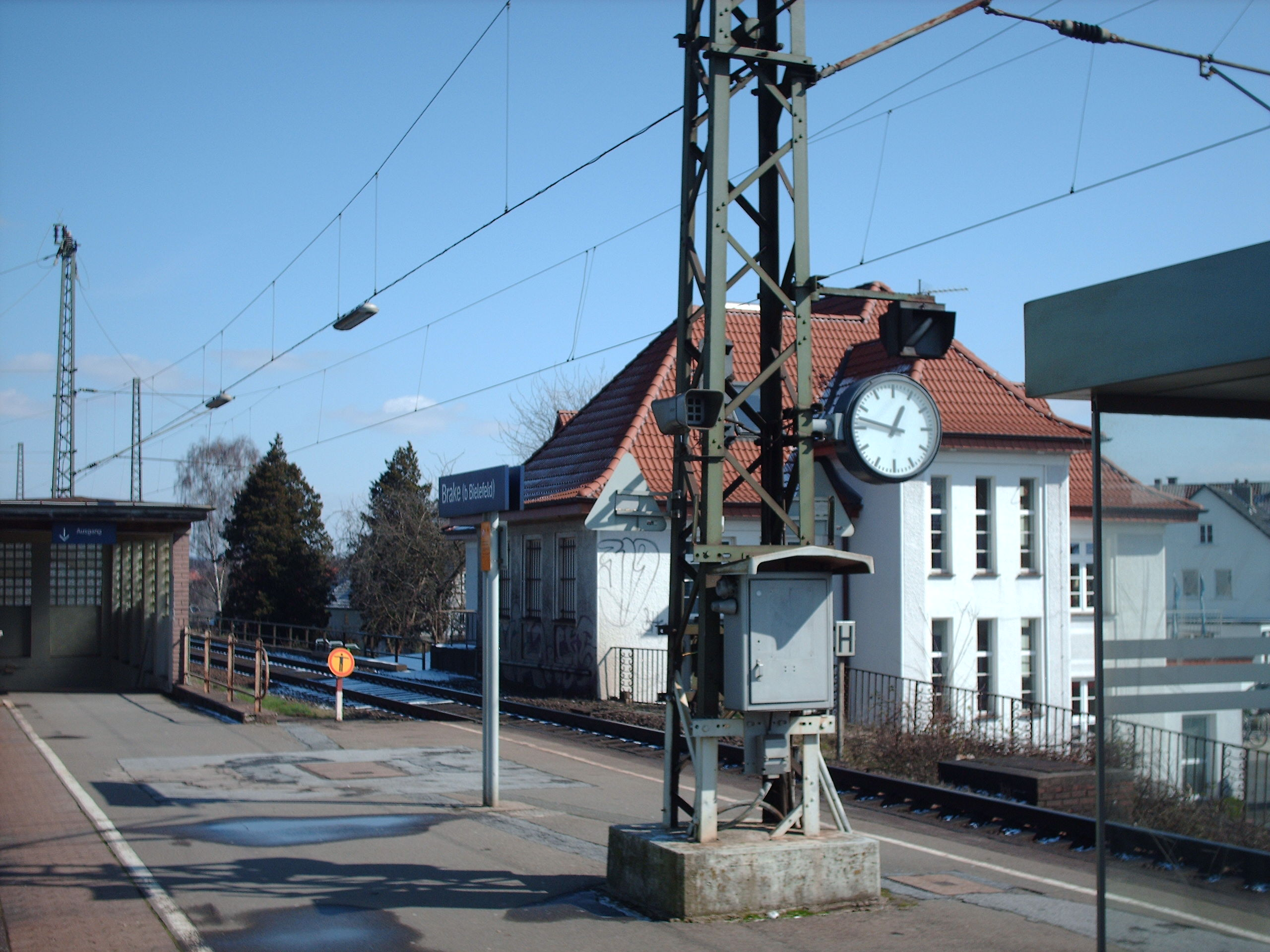

General information
- Location: Naggertstr. 45, Brake (b Bielefeld), Bielefeld, NRW; Germany
- Coordinates: 52°04′11″N 8°36′14″E
- Lines: Hamm–Minden (KBS 400); Bielefeld–Münster line (KBS 406)
- Platforms: 2

Construction
- Accessible: No

Other information
- Station code: 814
- DS100 code: EBRAH
- IBNR: 8001118
- Category: 5
- Fare zone: Westfalentarif: 60031
- Website: www.bahnhof.de

Services
| Preceding station | | Following station |
|---|---|---|
| Bielefeld Hbf Terminus | RB 71 | Herford towards Rahden |
| Bielefeld Hbf Terminus | RB 61 | Herford towards Hengelo |
Location

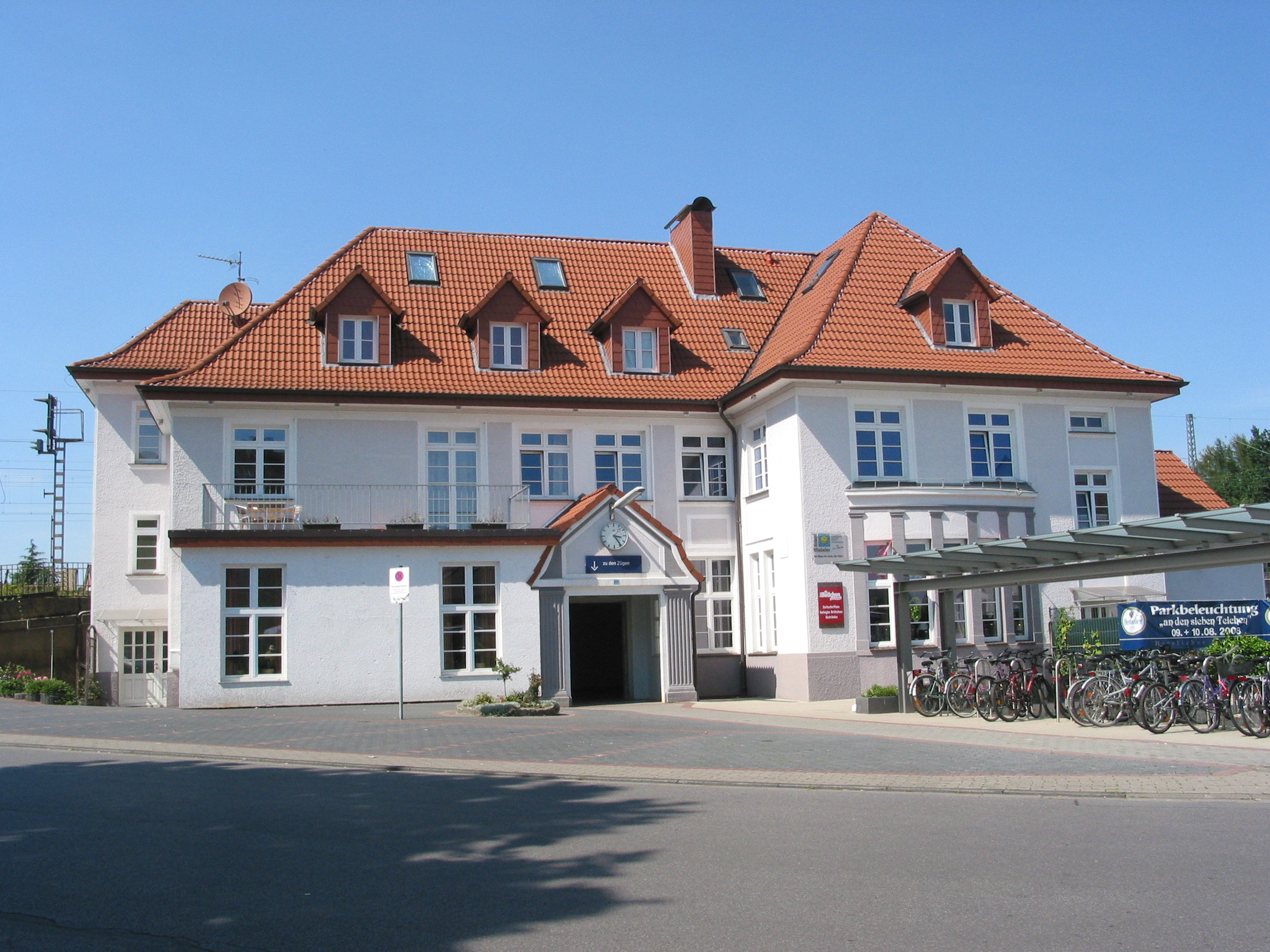
Bahnhof Bielefeld-Brake

Brake bei Bielefeld is a railway station located in Brake, a part of Bielefeld, Germany. The station is located on the Hamm–Minden railway line. The train services are operated by Eurobahn and WestfalenBahn.

== Train services ==
The following services currently call at Brake bei Bielefeld:

| Series | Train Type | Route | Material | Frequency | Notes |
|---|---|---|---|---|---|
| RB 61 | Eurobahn | Hengelo – Oldenzaal – Bad Bentheim – Schüttorf – Salzbergen – Rheine – Hörstel – Ibbenbüren-Esch – Ibbenbüren – Ibbenbüren-Laggenbeck – Osnabrück Altstadt – Osnabrück Hbf – Wissingen – Westerhausen – Melle – Bruchmühlen – Bünde (Westf) – Kirchlengern – Hiddenhausen-Schweicheln – Herford – Brake (b Bielefeld) – Bielefeld Hbf | | 1x per hour | Wiehengebirgsbahn |
| RB 71 | Eurobahn | Rahden – Espelkamp – Lübbecke – Holzhausen-Heddinghausen – Mesch Neue Mühle – Bieren-Rödinghausen – Bünde (Westf) – Kirchlengern – Hiddenhausen-Schweicheln – Herford – Brake (b Bielefeld) – Bielefeld Hbf | | 1x per hour | Ravensberger Bahn |
