= Hiddenhausen-Schweicheln station =

Railway station in Hiddenhausen, Germany

Hiddenhausen-Schweicheln
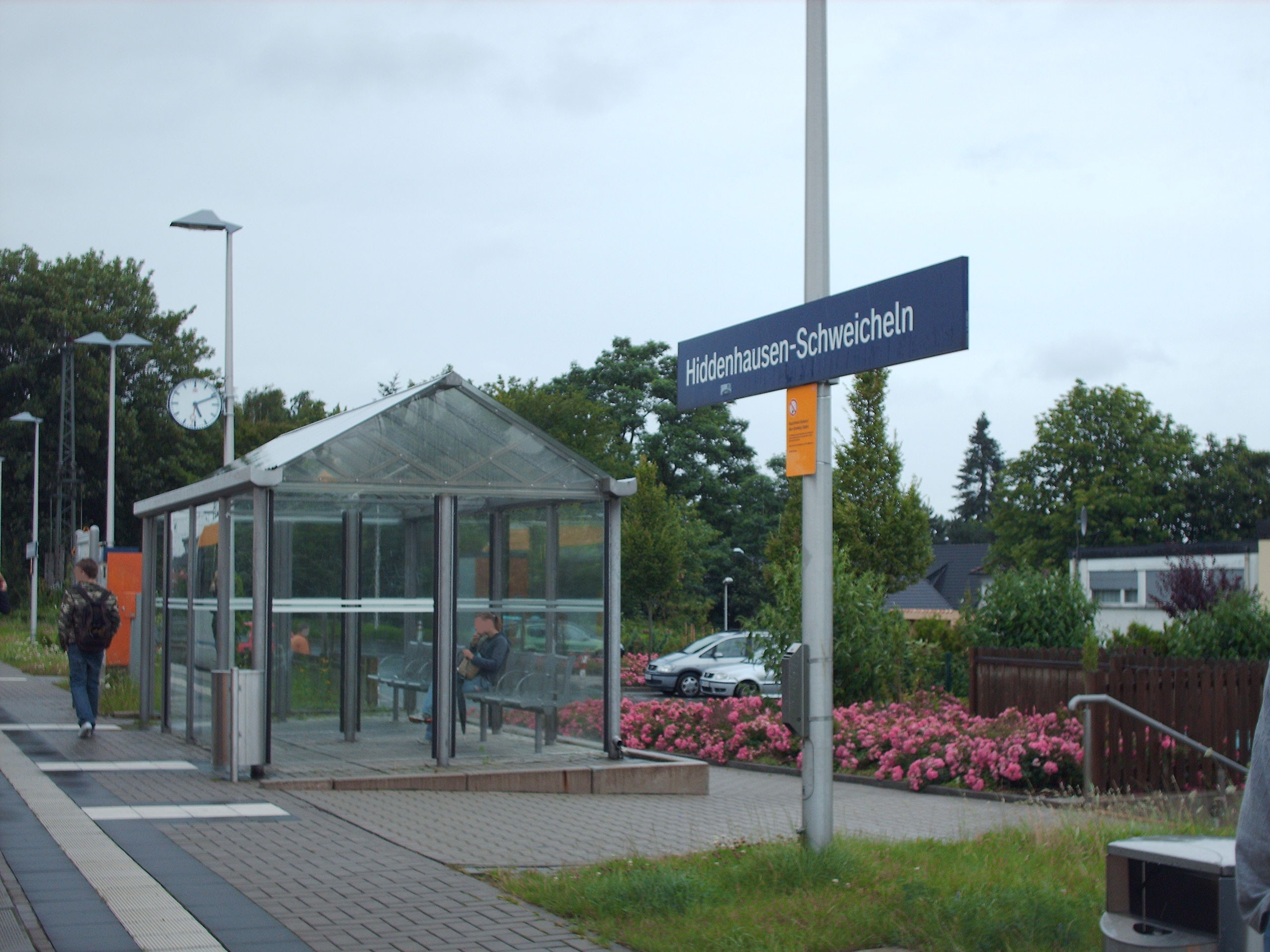

General information
- Location: Hiddenhausen, NRW; Germany
- Coordinates: 52°09′29″N 8°40′06″E
- Line: Bassum–Herford railway
- Platforms: 1

Construction
- Accessible: Yes

Other information
- Station code: 5817
- DS100 code: HHIS
- Category: 6
- Fare zone: Westfalentarif: 62421
- Website: www.bahnhof.de

History
- Opened: 15 December 2002

Services
| Preceding station | | Following station |
|---|---|---|
| Kirchlengern towards Hengelo | RB 61 | Herford towards Bielefeld Hbf |
| Kirchlengern towards Rahden | RB 71 | Herford towards Bielefeld Hbf |
Location

Hiddenhausen-Schweicheln is a railway station located in Hiddenhausen, Germany. The station is located on the Bassum–Herford railway (which runs through the station next to the Hamm–Minden railway, which has no platforms here). The station was opened on 15 December 2002. The train services are operated by Eurobahn.

== Train services ==
The following services currently call at Hiddenhausen-Schweicheln:

- Wiehengebirgs-Bahn Bad Bentheim - Rheine - Osnabrück - Herford - Bielefeld

| Series | Route | Frequency |
|---|---|---|
| RB 71 | Rahden – Espelkamp – Lübbecke – Holzhausen-Heddinghausen – Mesch Neue Mühle – Bieren-Rödinghausen – Bünde –Kirchlengern – Hiddenhausen-Schweicheln – Herford – Brake bei Bielefeld – Bielefeld Hbf | Hourly |
