= Ems-Leine-Express =

Coordinates: 52.2730°N 8.0614°E

RE 60 Ems-Leine-Express

Overview
- Locale: North Rhine-Westphalia

Service
- Route number: 310, 370, 375

Technical
- Line length: 270.4 km (168.0 mi)
- Operating speed: 160 km/h (99 mph) (maximum)

The Ems-Leine-Express (RE 60) is the name of a German Regional-Express service in North Rhine-Westphalia that has connected the Emsland city of Rheine, North Rhine-Westphalia, the regional centre of Osnabrück, the east Westphalian city of Minden and the Lower Saxony regional centres of Hanover and Braunschweig since 5 November 2000.

The Ems-Leine-Express is notable for crossing the state border between Lower Saxony and North Rhine-Westphalia (NRW) three times at the following locations:

- between Ibbenbüren-Laggenbeck and Osnabrück Altstadt
- between Melle and Bünde
- between Minden and Bückeburg.

== History and future ==
In 1998, the service began in Bad Bentheim and went via Osnabrück to Hanover. In 2000, the section west of Rheine was withdrawn and services were extended to Brunswick (Braunschweig). The Bad Bentheim–Rheine route is now served only by the Wiehengebirgs-Bahn. The Ems-Leine-Express services were initially operated by DB Regio Nord. New procedures for procuring future operations of the services were introduced In 2012. It is now operated by WestfalenBahn for 15 years from 2015. The service is designated as RE 60 only in North Rhine-Westphalia. The service was named the Ems-Leine-Express with the introduction of the integrated regular-interval timetable in the whole of North Rhine-Westphalia (NRW-Takt) in 1998.

== Rail services ==
The service runs every two hours. Together with the service designated as the Weser-Leine Express in NRW, which also runs every two hours to Bielefeld, an hourly service is provided between Braunschweig and Löhne. The Wiehengebirgs-Bahn runs every hour between Kirchlengern and Rheine. These services connect with the Weser-Leine-Express in Herford. In addition, the total route is served by Intercity Express services.

The service is operated with trains of five double-deck coaches hauled mostly by class 111, or occasionally class 146, locomotives. Since the line is operated with a double-deck driving trailer–pushed towards Rheine–the locomotive does not have to be switched around at the terminus. A dining service with a minibar is provided between Osnabrück and Hanover.

== Fares ==
The Ems-Leine-Express passes through the territory of four regional transport associations with different fare systems:

- between Rheine and Osnabrück, the Münsterlandtarif (Münsterland tariff) of the Verkehrsgemeinschaft Münsterland (transport community of Münsterland) applies;
- between Bünde and Minden, the Der Sechser ("the six") fare of the Verkehrsverbund OstWestfalenLippe (transport association of OstWestfalenLippe) applies;
- between Haste and Hämelerwald the fares of the Großraum-Verkehr Hannover (transport association of greater Hannover, GVH) apply;
- between Hämelerwald and Brunswick the fares of the Verbundtarif Region Braunschweig (Brunswick fare alliance, VRB) apply.

Fares for the entire state of Lower Saxony (e.g. the Niedersachsen-Ticket) also apply to the North Rhine-Westphalian sections (Bückeburg–Melle and Osnabrück–Rheine). However, these tickets cannot be used for connections via Herford (for trains towards NRW the fare limit is Löhne or Kirchlengern). The NRW-Tarif (fare) applies between Rheine and Minden for all locations except Melle, while NRW holiday tickets apply to the whole route. The Osnabrück–Bünde section does not belong to the zones of any local fare system and so ordinary Deutsche Bahn fares apply. GVH fares apply for season tickets from Bückeburg.

== Railways ==
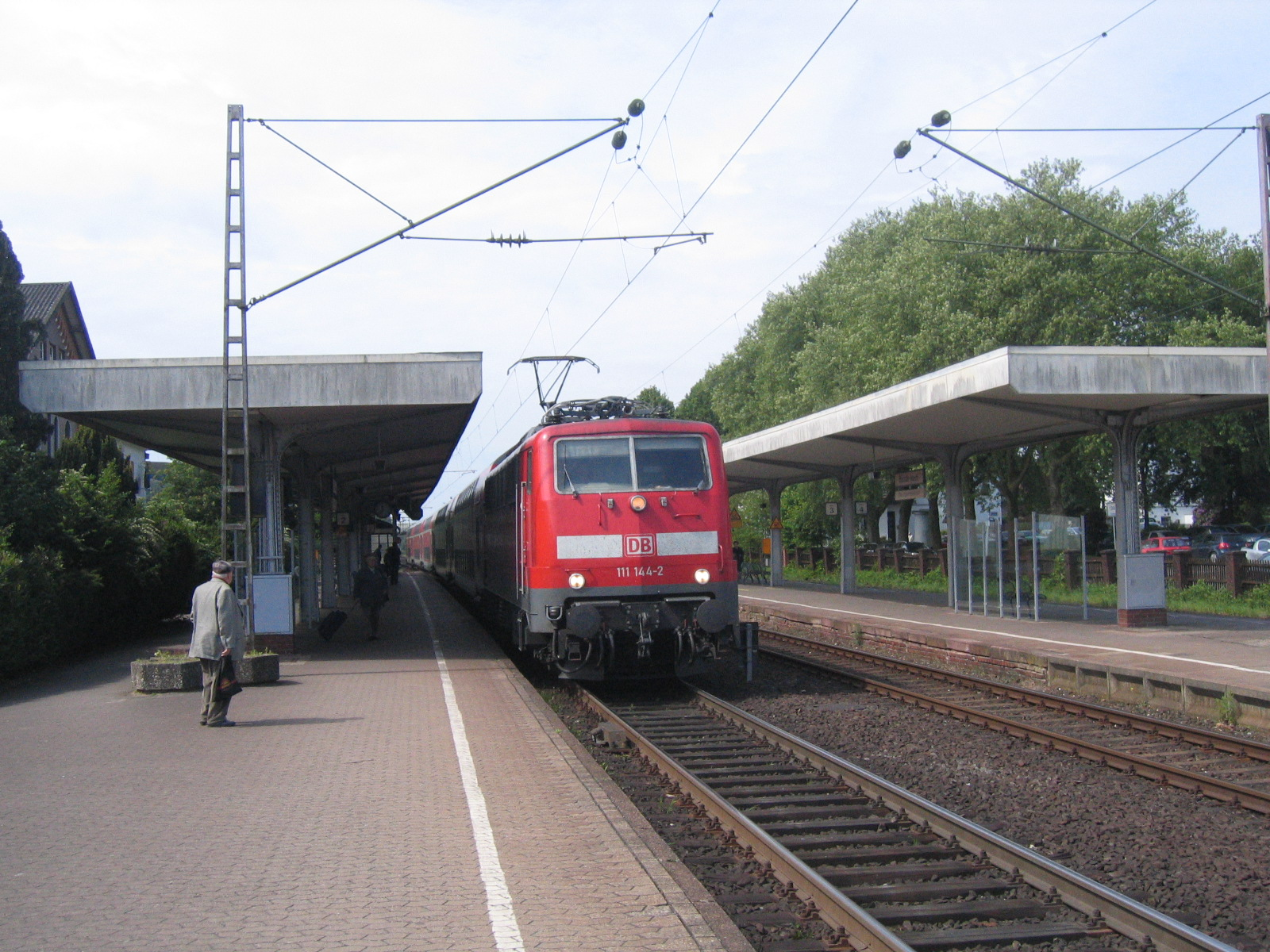
Ems-Leine-Express hauled by class 111 locomotive towards Braunschweig in Bünde station

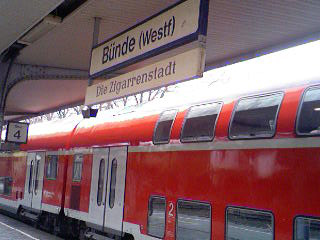
Sign in Bünde – Die Zigarrenstadt ("Bünde – the cigar city")

From west to east the Ems-Leine-Express uses the following lines:

- the Löhne–Rheine railway (124 km between Rheine and Löhne, part of timetable route 375)
- the Hamm–Minden railway (21 km between Löhne and Minden, part of timetable route 370)
- the Hanover–Minden railway (64.4 km between Minden and Hanover, part of timetable route 370)
- the Hanover–Brunswick railway (61 km between Hanover and Brunswick, part of timetable route 310).

Overall, the service between Rheine and Brunswick covers a distance of 270.4 kilometres. The scheduled time (including intermediate stops) between Rheine and Braunschweig is 3:03, resulting in an average cruising speed of about 90 km/h. Four train sets consisting of locomotive, double-deck carriages and driving trailers are used for the service.

== See also ==
- List of regional railway lines in North Rhine-Westphalia
