= Kirchlengern station =

Railway station in Kirchlengern, Germany

Kirchlengern
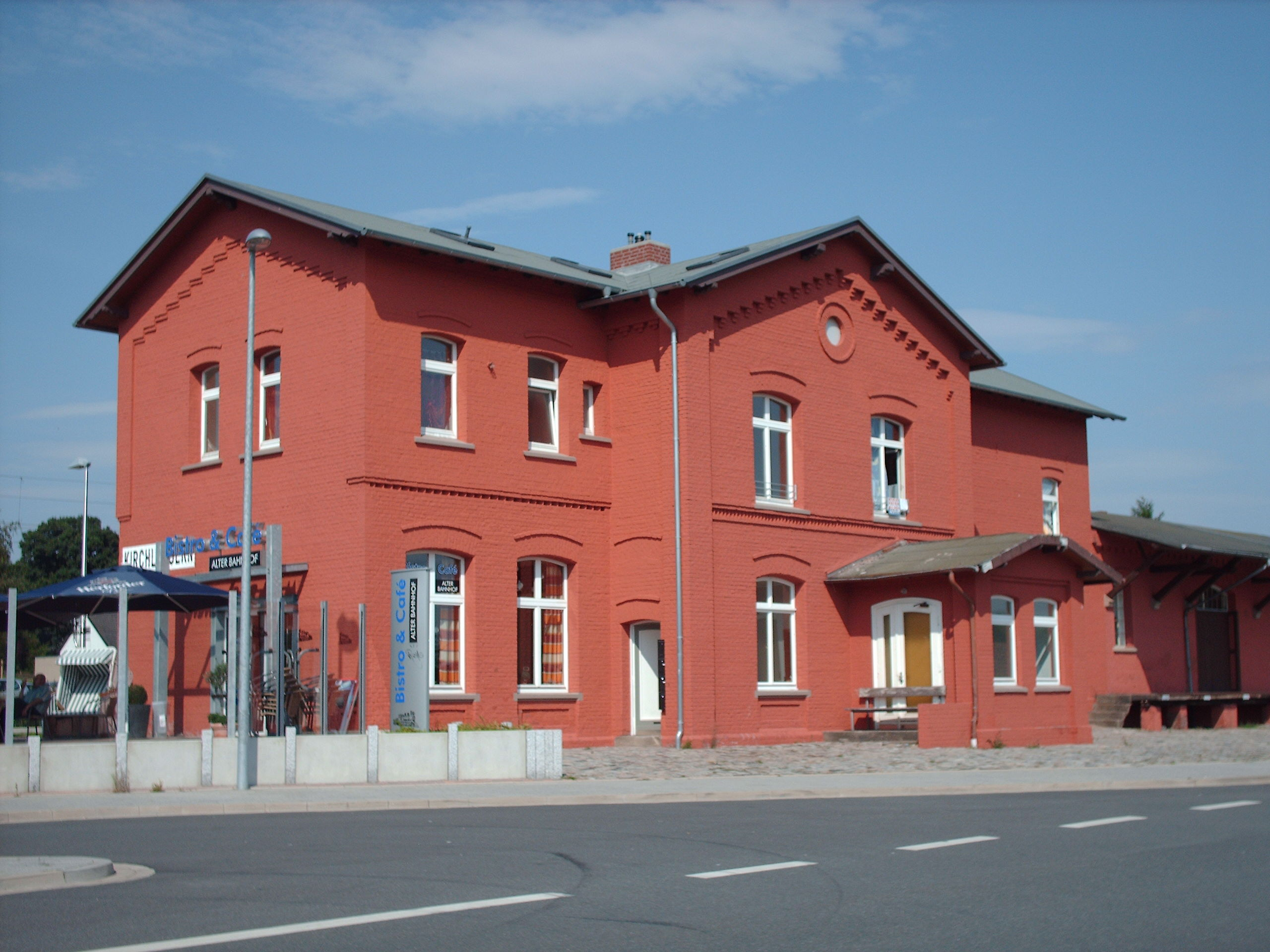

General information
- Location: Detmold, NRW; Germany
- Coordinates: 52°11′49″N 8°38′43″E
- Lines: Löhne–Rheine (KBS 375); Rahden–Herford (KBS 386)
- Platforms: 1

Construction
- Accessible: Yes

Other information
- Station code: 3201
- DS100 code: HKLG
- Category: 5
- Fare zone: Westfalentarif: 62501
- Website: www.bahnhof.de

History
- Opened: 21 November 1855

Services
Preceding station		Following station
Bünde towards Rheine	RE 60	Löhne towards Braunschweig Hbf
Preceding station		Following station
Bünde towards Hengelo	RB 61	Hiddenhausen-Schweicheln towards Bielefeld Hbf
Bünde towards Rahden	RB 71	Hiddenhausen-Schweicheln towards Bielefeld Hbf
Preceding station	DB Regio Nord	Following station
Bünde towards Rheine	RE 62	Löhne (Westfalen) Terminus
Location

Kirchlengern is a railway station located in Kirchlengern, Germany. The station is located on the Löhne–Rheine line. The train services are operated by Eurobahn, NordWestBahn and WestfalenBahn.

== Rail services ==
The station is served by the following services as of 2025:

- Regional services RE 60 Rheine – Osnabrück – Kirchlengern – Minden – Hannover – Braunschweig
- Local services RB 61 Bad Bentheim – Rheine - Osnabrück – Kirchlengern – Herford - Bielefeld
- Regional services RE 62 Rheine – Ibbenbüren – Osnabrück – Kirchlengern – Löhne
- Local services RB 71 Rahden – Bünde – Kirchlengern – Herford – Bielefeld
