= Bruchmühlen station =

Railway station in Melle, Germany

Bruchmühlen
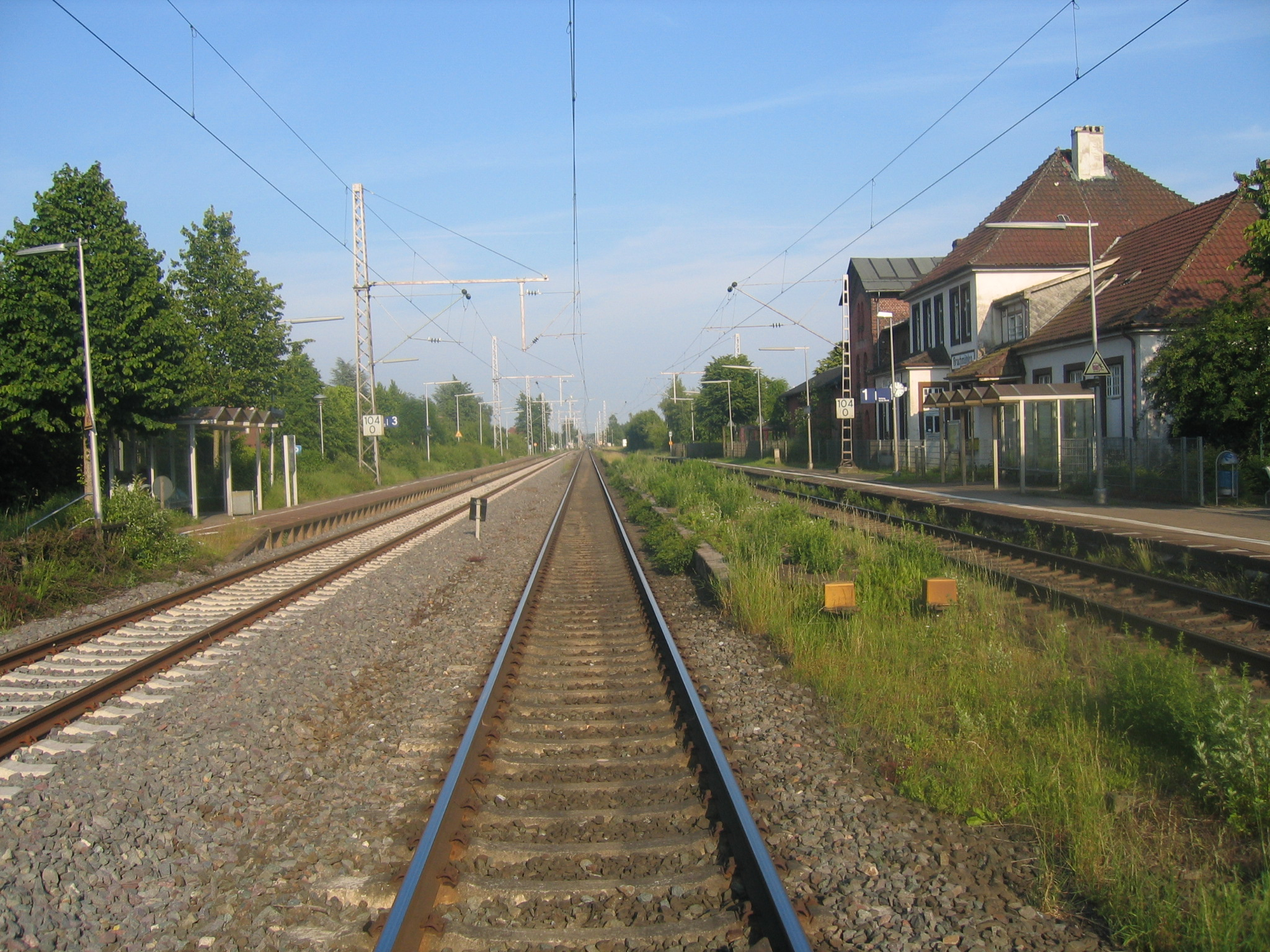

General information
- Location: Melle, Lower Saxony; Germany
- Coordinates: 52°12′16″N 8°26′58″E
- Lines: Löhne–Rheine (KBS 375)
- Platforms: 2
- Tracks: 3

Other information
- Station code: 903
- DS100 code: HBUE
- Category: 6
- Fare zone: VOS: 368 (buses only)
- Website: www.bahnhof.de
Location

Bruchmühlen is a railway station located in Bruchmühlen, a part of Melle, Germany. The station is located on the Löhne-Rheine railway. The train services are operated by WestfalenBahn.

== Train services ==
The station is served by the following services:

- Local services RB 61 Hengelo - Bad Bentheim - Rheine - Osnabrück - Herford - Bielefeld

Preceding station		Following station
Melle towards Hengelo	RB 61	Bünde towards Bielefeld Hbf
