= Melle station =

Railway station in Melle, Germany

Melle

General information
- Location: Melle, Lower Saxony; Germany
- Coordinates: 52°12′34″N 8°20′27″E
- Lines: Löhne–Rheine (KBS 375)
- Platforms: 5

Other information
- Station code: 4044
- DS100 code: HMEL
- Category: 4
- Fare zone: VOS: 360 (buses only)
- Website: www.bahnhof.de

Services
Preceding station		Following station
Osnabrück Hbf towards Rheine	RE 60	Bünde towards Braunschweig Hbf
Preceding station		Following station
Westerhausen towards Hengelo	RB 61	Bruchmühlen towards Bielefeld Hbf
Location

Melle is a railway station located in Melle, Germany. The station is located on the Löhne–Rheine railway. The train services are operated by WestfalenBahn.

== Train services ==
The station is served by the following services:

- Regional services RE 60 Rheine - Osnabrück - Minden - Hannover - Braunschweig
- Local services RB 61 Bad Bentheim - Rheine - Osnabrück - Herford - Bielefeld
