= Emsland (region) =

Emsland (German pronunciation: [ˈɛmsˌlant]) is the name of a region along the lower Ems River in western Lower Saxony and northern North Rhine-Westphalia. It is divided into the so-called Hanoverian and Westphalian Emsland.
