= Herford station =

Railway station in Herford, Germany

Herford
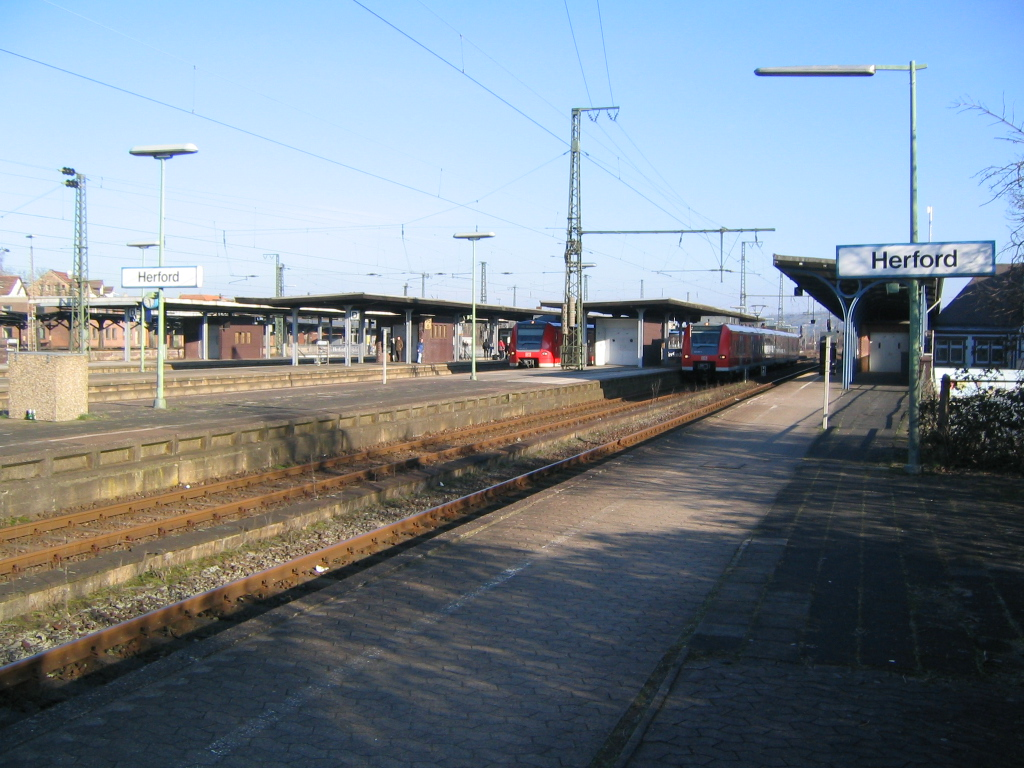

General information
- Location: Herford, North Rhine-Westphalia; Germany
- Coordinates: 52°07′10″N 8°39′50″E
- Lines: Hamm–Minden (KBS 370 and KBS 400); Herford–Bünde–Rahden/Rheine (KBS 386); Herford–Altenbeken (KBS 405)
- Platforms: 7

Construction
- Accessible: Yes

Other information
- Station code: 2708
- DS100 code: EHFD
- IBNR: 8000162
- Category: 2
- Fare zone: Westfalentarif: 62001
- Website: www.bahnhof.de

History
- Opened: 15 October 1847; current station building: 1902
Services
Preceding station	DB Fernverkehr	Following station
Bielefeld Hbf towards Köln Hbf	ICE 10	Minden (Westfalen) towards Berlin Ostbahnhof
Bielefeld Hbf towards Aachen Hbf	ICE 14	Hannover Hbf towards Berlin Ostbahnhof
Bielefeld Hbf towards Köln Hbf	IC 55	Bad Oeynhausen towards Dresden Hbf
Preceding station	National Express Germany	Following station
Bielefeld Hbf towards Cologne/Bonn Airport	RE 6 (Rhein-Weser-Express)	Löhne towards Minden
Preceding station		Following station
Bielefeld Hbf Terminus	RE 78	Löhne towards Nienburg (Weser)
Brake bei Bielefeld towards Bielefeld Hbf	RB 61	Hiddenhausen-Schweicheln towards Hengelo
Brake bei Bielefeld towards Bielefeld Hbf	RB 71	Hiddenhausen-Schweicheln towards Rahden
Terminus	RB 72	Bad Salzuflen towards Paderborn Hbf
Preceding station		Following station
Bielefeld Hbf Terminus	RE 70	Löhne towards Braunschweig Hbf
Preceding station	Start	Following station
Terminus	RB 77	Löhne towards Hildesheim Hbf
Location

Herford station is a junction station with four platforms and seven platform tracks in the town of Herford in the German state of North Rhine-Westphalia. It lies on the quadruple track, electrified Hamm–Minden railway, a section of the original route of the historic Cologne-Minden Railway Company.

In Herford Station, the line to Altenbeken branches off to the south and the Ravensberg Railway branches off towards the north to Bünde and Rahden with a connection to the Löhne–Rheine railway. It is classified by Deutsche Bahn as a category 2 station.

== Location ==
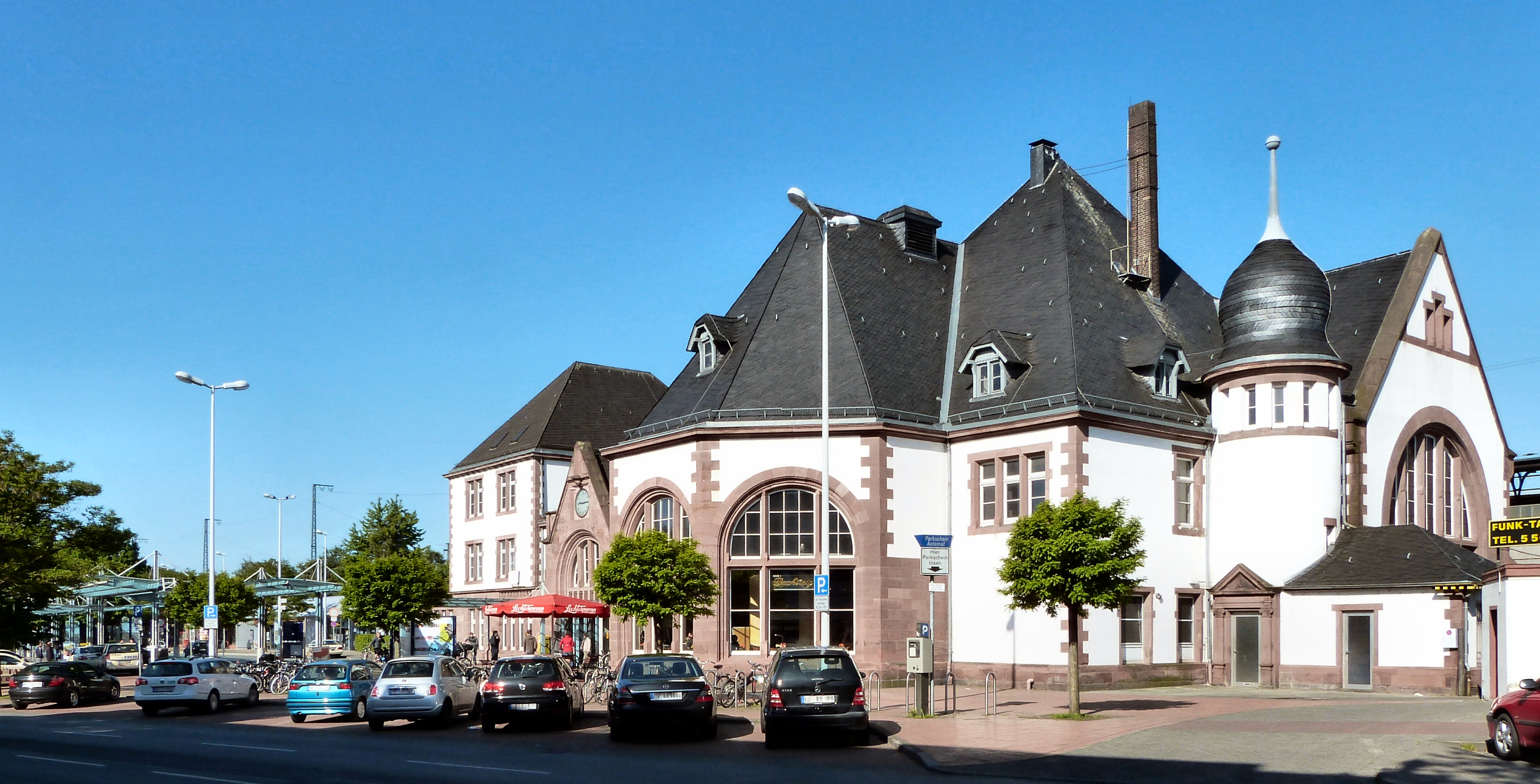
Station building with covered access to the bus platform

The station is located in Radewiger Feldmark, about 300 metres from the Herford inner city (Radewig). Just a little further, is the MARTa Herford art and design museum opened in 2005. On the way there is the Herford music school. The district administration, the army recruiting office, the tax office, the Technisches Rathaus (a section of the municipal administration dealing with planning and planning approvals), the GoParc discothèque and the Radewig and MARTa-Viertel parking garages are also nearby.

The railway line is elevated so that intersecting streets of the town can run under it. The station is orientated in a largely north-south direction.

== History ==
Herford was connected by a single-track line built by the Cologne-Minden Railway Company on 15 October 1847. The first provisional station building was built out of brick in 1851. A second track was opened to Bad Oeynhausen in 1853 and to Bielefeld in 1854. The station facilities were rebuilt and the entrance building was extended between 1873 and 1875. A roundhouse with a turntable, water tower and a coal shed were built in 1879 and 1880. The single-track line to Detmold was opened on 31 December 1880. The old station building was replaced by a new building in 1902. The Herford–Kirchlengern line, which has always been single track, was opened on 1 was July 1904.

Construction of two freight tracks between Hamm and Minden started in 1911 and they were taken in operation in stages between 1912 and 1916. The line has had four tracks ever since. In this context, the then ground-level line was placed on an embankment and the level crossings were replaced by bridges.

During the Second World War there was only minor damage that could be repaired relatively quickly. The demolition of the locomotive depot began in 1954.

The main line was electrified in the mid-1960s. The first electrically-hauled train ran through the station on 29 September 1968. This was followed by the electrification of the line to Altenbeken on 27 May 1975 and the connection to Kirchlengern on 20 September 1976.

The wooden roofs on the platforms were replaced with steel roofs and a new freight handling facility was built in 1975/76. In 1987, the station building was heritage-listed. Since 1988, Intercity trains have also stopped in Herford. General freight operations were abandoned in 1997.

== Services ==
The station is served by two Intercity services:

Line	Route	Frequency
ICE 10	Cologne – Düsseldorf – Düsseldorf Airport – Duisburg – Essen – Dortmund – Hamm – Bielefeld – Herford – Hanover – Magdeburg – Berlin Hbf – Berlin Ostbahnhof	One train pair
ICE 14	Aachen – Cologne – Düsseldorf – Essen – Bochum – Dortmund – Hamm – Bielefeld – Herford – Hanover – Wolfsburg – Berlin – Berlin Ostbahnhof	Four times a day
IC 55	Dresden – Riesa – Leipzig – Magdeburg – Hannover – Herford – Bielefeld – Dortmund – Wuppertal – Cologne – Bonn – Koblenz – Mainz – Mannheim – Heidelberg – Stuttgart (– Tübingen)	120 min

Herford is the second biggest node for regional services after Bielefeld in Ostwestfalen-Lippe and is served by several Regional-Express and Regionalbahn services.

Line	Name	Route	Frequency	Operator
RE 6	Rhein-Weser-Express	Minden – Löhne – Herford – Bielefeld – Hamm – Dortmund – Duisburg – Düsseldorf – Neuss – Cologne – Cologne/Bonn Airport	60 min	National Express
RB 61	Wiehengebirgs-Bahn	Bad Bentheim – Rheine – Osnabrück – Bünde – Herford – Bielefeld	60 min	Eurobahn
RE 70	Weser-Leine-Express	Braunschweig – Hannover – Minden – Löhne – Herford – Bielefeld	120 min	WestfalenBahn
RB 71	Ravensberger Bahn	Rahden – Bünde – Herford – Bielefeld	60 min	Eurobahn
RB 72	Ostwestfalen-Bahn	Herford – Lage – Detmold – Altenbeken – Paderborn	60 min	Eurobahn
RB 77	Weser-Bahn	Herford – Löhne – Hamelin – Hildesheim	60 min	Start
RE 78	Porta-Express	Nienburg – Minden – Löhne – Herford – Bielefeld	120 min	Eurobahn

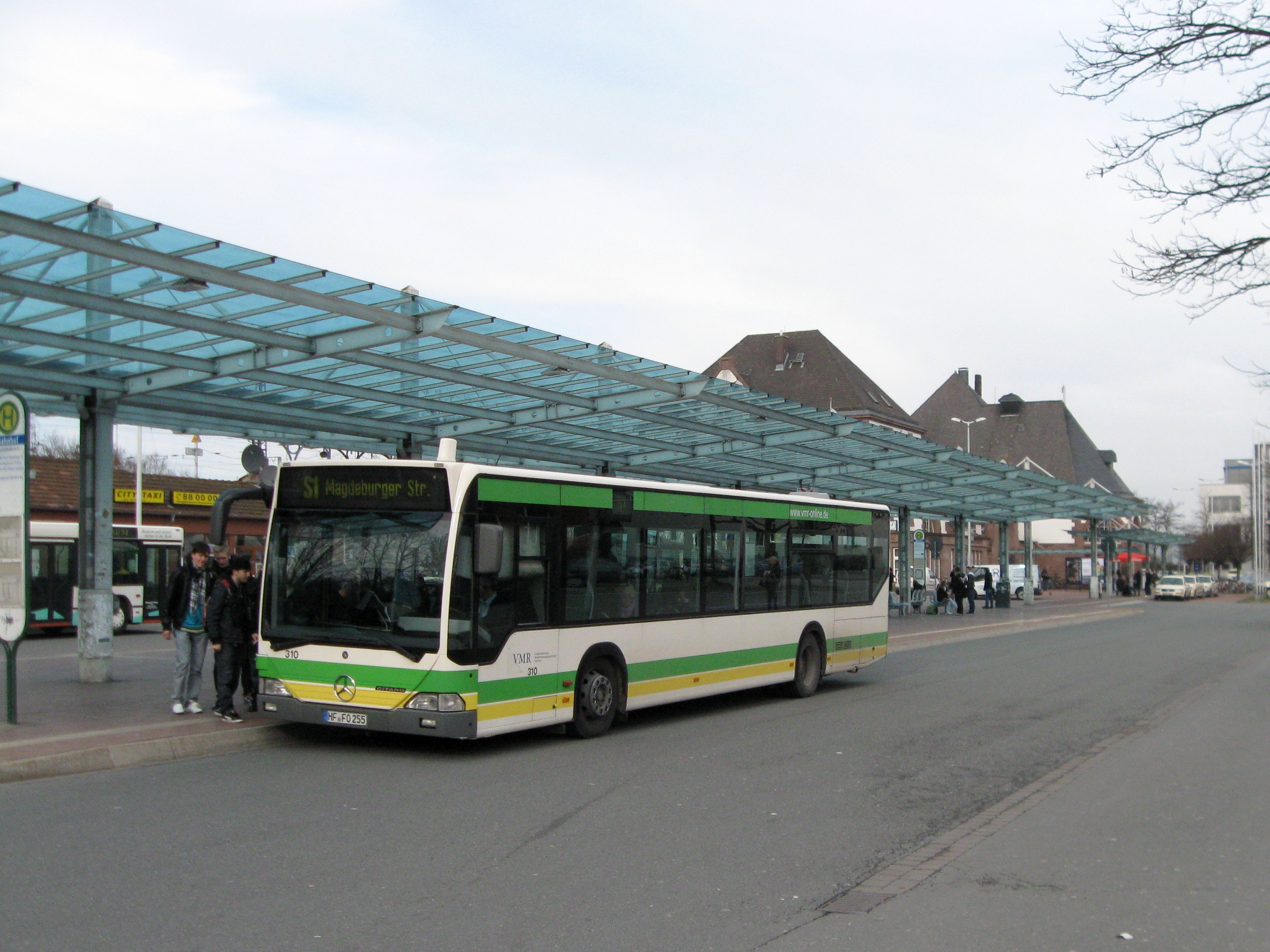
Bus station with a city bus operated by Verkehrsbetriebe Minden-Ravensberg (VMR) in February 2011

The station is also served by 12 local and regional bus routes.
