= Bünde station =

Railway station in Bünde, Germany

Bünde (Westf)
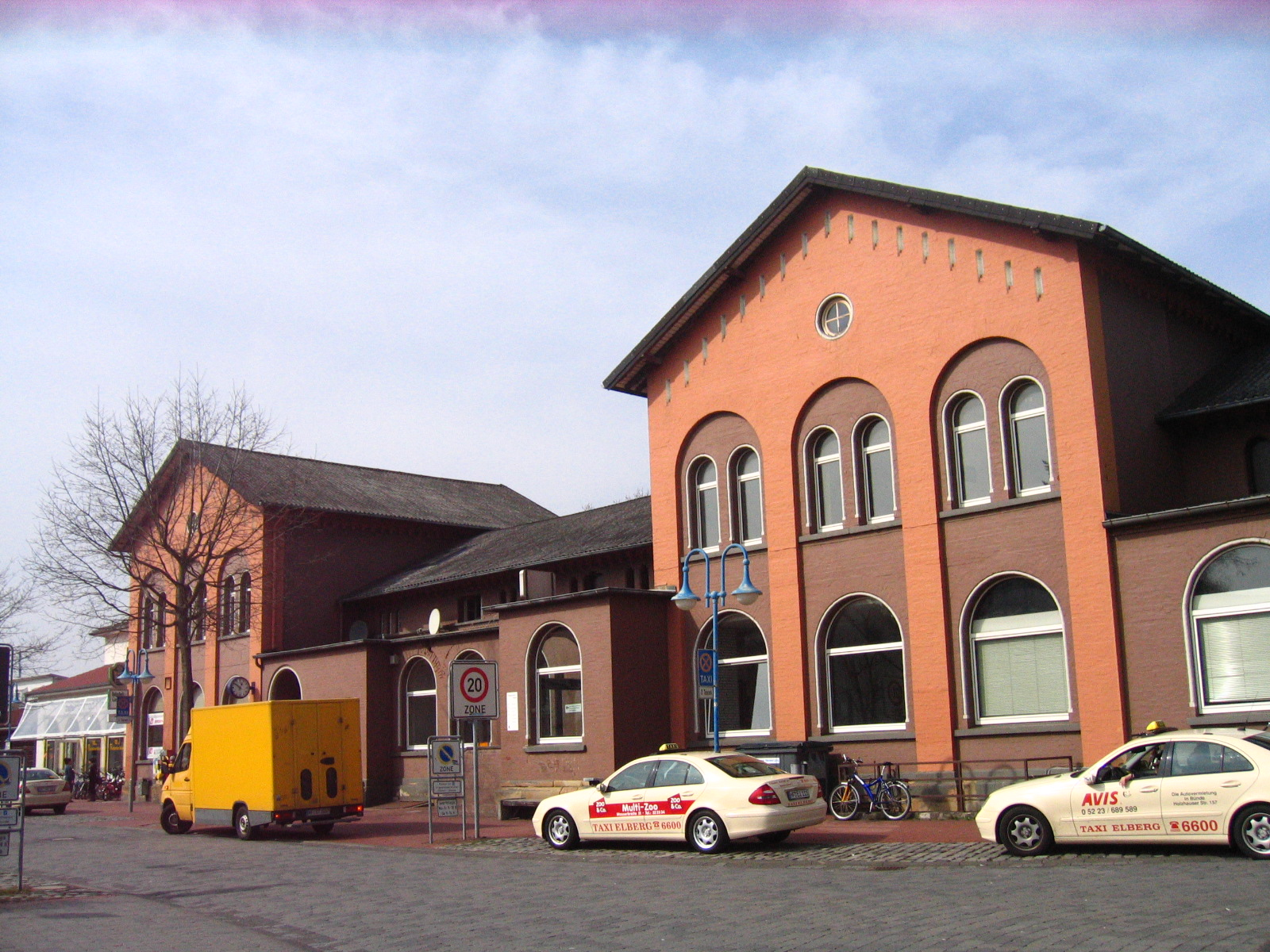

General information
- Location: Bahnhofstr. 82, Bünde, NRW; Germany
- Coordinates: 52°12′07″N 8°34′27″E
- Lines: Löhne–Rheine (KBS 375); Rahden–Herford (KBS 386)
- Platforms: 3

Construction
- Accessible: Yes

Other information
- Station code: 968
- DS100 code: HBDE
- IBNR: 8000059
- Category: 4
- Fare zone: Westfalentarif: 62201
- Website: www.bahnhof.de

History
- Opened: 21 November 1855

Services
Preceding station	DB Fernverkehr	Following station
Osnabrück Hbf towards Amsterdam Centraal	ICE 77	Hannover Hbf towards Berlin Ostbahnhof
Preceding station		Following station
Melle towards Rheine	RE 60	Kirchlengern towards Braunschweig Hbf
Preceding station		Following station
Bruchmühlen towards Hengelo	RB 61	Kirchlengern towards Bielefeld Hbf
Bieren-Rödinghausen towards Rahden	RB 71	Kirchlengern towards Bielefeld Hbf
Preceding station	DB Regio Nord	Following station
Melle towards Rheine	RE 62	Kirchlengern towards Löhne (Westfalen)
Location

Bünde (Westf) station is located in Bünde in the German state of North Rhine-Westphalia on the Löhne–Rheine railway and Rahden–Herford railway. The rail services are operated by Deutsche Bahn, WestfalenBahn and Eurobahn.

== History ==
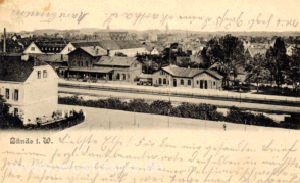
The station on a postcard from 1903, view from the north

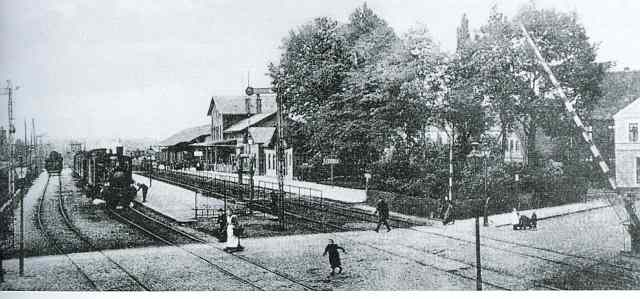
The station in 1904 from the western level crossing, now replaced by an underpass. The former track 5 is on the left

The main line between Löhne and Rheine opened in 1856 as part of the Hanoverian Western Railway. It was followed in 1899/1901 by the Rahden–Sulingen–Bassum line. Direct services to Bremen ran over this line until June 1994. Reactivation of the disused Lower Saxony section is not planned.

The station sign reads Bünde (Westf.)—Die Zigarrenstadt (“the cigar city”). It recalls that Bünde was once the centre of the European tobacco industry. The tobacco companies were located around the station, therefore, the wood for tobacco boxes and, of course tobacco, were brought in by rail and its products were exported by rail. No tobacco factories are located near the station anymore. The only sign of this period is the nearby imposing tobacco store that is located in one of the many warehouses that used to operate near the station. Every year a market for tobacco products is held between the station and the tobacco store, as well as on the station forecourt.

== Outlook ==
Deutsche Bahn announced in June 2008 that a comprehensive renovation of the station would begin around 2011. The cost of €7.47 million would be shared between Deutsche Bahn, the federal government and the state government of North Rhine-Westphalia. The platform is being raised to allow barrier-free train access, lifts are being installed and a new pedestrian subway is being built. Work began in March 2015.

== Infrastructure ==
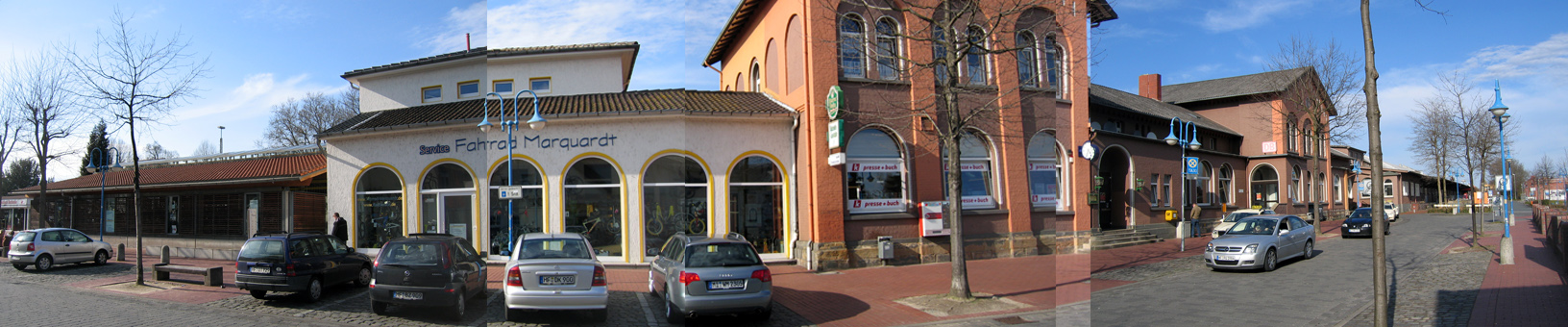
View from the south, cycle parking on the left

The station has three platform tracks, which are numbered 2–4, as the former track 1 was not intended for passenger services. Track 1 has been abandoned and only the track bed and a track indicator board mark its location. The freight loading track ended at the eastern part of the station and was accessible via a platform adjacent to the entrance building warehouse; this allowed loading end-on and from the south side. The warehouse had loading ramps for trucks on its south side; it is now used for a restaurant. Following the dismantling of track 1, marshalling and stabling tracks were abandoned on the eastern apron of the station as well as some loading ramps. In their place a station parking area was built east of the station forecourt. The loading tracks that formerly connected to the premises of Imperial (now part of Miele) and other companies in Ennigloh (which is north of the station), are no longer available. There is still a connecting track to a building material establishment, but this has not been used for several years. Formerly, there was also a track 5 on the north side; this was also not intended for passenger operations.

In the freight yard, only tracks 19,20 and 21 are available and track 20 is currently locked out of operations. The former loading ramp was purchased by the city of Bünde and is now redeveloped with commercial premises.

== Rail services ==
The station is served at four-hour intervals by ICE 77 intercity service, Amsterdam–Osnabrück–Hannover–Wolfsburg–Berlin. It is also served by several Regional-Express and Regionalbahn services.

The station is served by the following services as of 2026:

Line	Route	Frequency (mins)
ICE 77	Amsterdam – Amersfoort – Hengelo – Osnabrück – Bünde – Hannover – Berlin	120
RE 60	Rheine – Osnabrück – Bünde – Minden – Hannover – Braunschweig	120
RB 61	Bad Bentheim – Rheine – Osnabrück – Bünde – Herford – Bielefeld	60
RE 62	Rheine – Ibbenbüren – Osnabrück – Bünde – Löhne	120
RB 71	Rahden – Bünde – Herford – Bielefeld	60

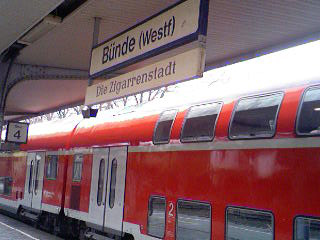
The Ems-Leine-Express towards Rheine on platform 4

=== Fares ===
The station is covered by the Sechser-Tarif (fares of “the six”) of the Zweckverband Verkehrsverbund OWL (transport association of Ostwestfalen-Lippe) and the NRW-tariff (fares) of North Rhine-Westphalia. On the Rheine–Osnabrück–Minden route the Niedersachsen-Ticket of Lower Saxony can also be used, but it is not valid to Rahden and for connecting to Herford.

== Connections ==
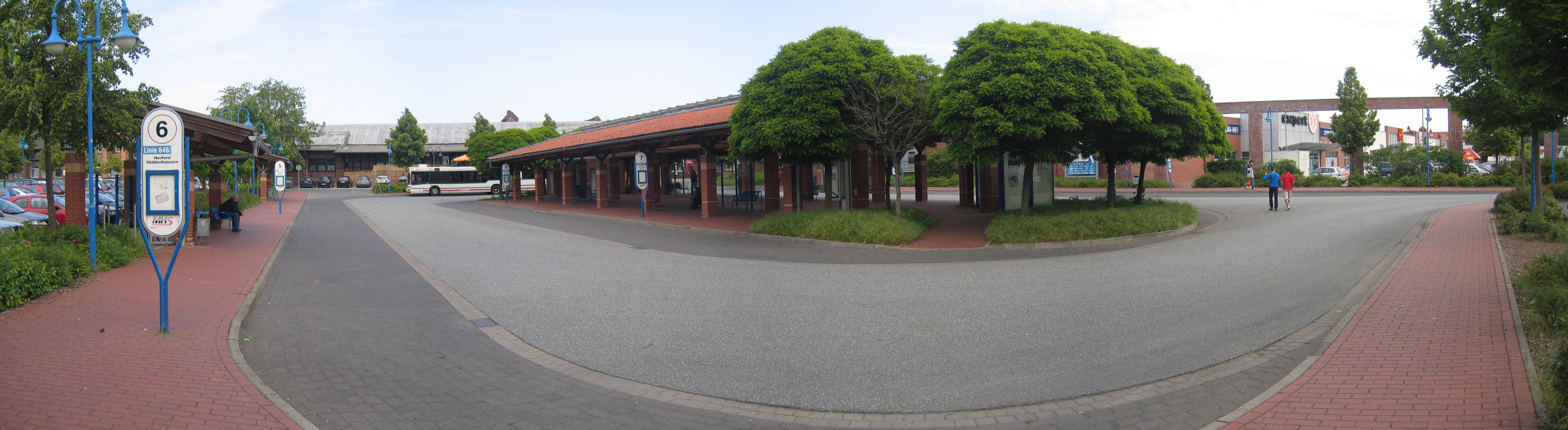
Bus station

From the central bus station next to the station local buses run to Herford and Enger. More buses or taxi-buses runs to Hüllhorst, Kirchlengern, Spenge and Rödinghausen. City buses on line 2 (Ennigloh Süd–Bahnhof–Bustreff am Museumsplatz–Südlengern) stop in front of the station building.

At the station there is a park-and-ride area for over 300 vehicles and a bicycle parking garage. The long-distance BahnRadRoute Weser–Lippe (a cycle route with good rail connections) and the Else–Werre cycle route run past the station.

=== Station services ===
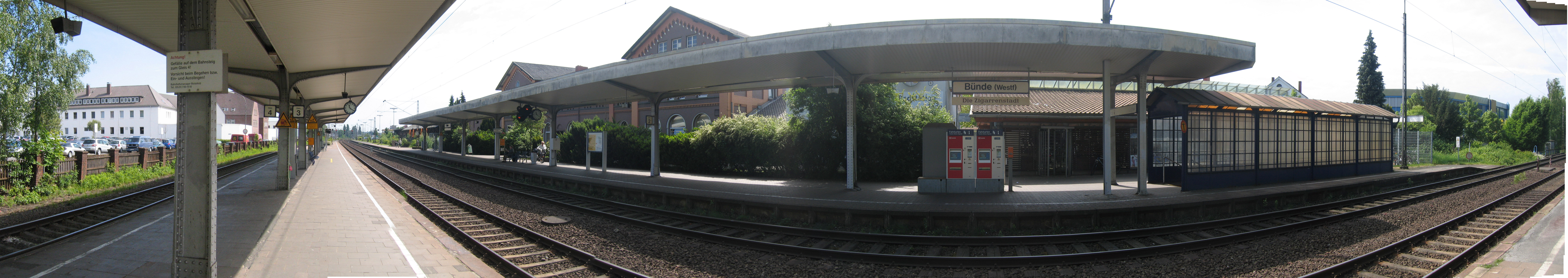
View from track 3 towards track 2

At the station there is a DB travel centre, a newspaper shop, a restaurant and a second-hand shop. A warehouse building immediately to its east on the former track 1 contains restaurant facilities and a store for furniture and decorative items. Only the platform on track 2 is accessible without steps, so the station is not generally accessible for the disabled. Access to platform tracks 3 and 4 can only be reached through a subway. The platforms are mostly covered.

The cycle parking garage was opened in 1999 and has almost 300 cycle parking spaces. Access is by an electronic access control and is possible around the clock. The bike station is right next to the so-called Arkadenhaus, the western part of the station building. This now houses to a cycle shop, which also runs the cycle parking garage. The Arkadenhaus was damaged by fire, but was saved from already planned demolition and the building was renovated for the cycle shop and the cycle garage.
