= Ibbenbüren station =

Railway station in Ibbenbüren, Germany

Coordinates: 52°16′36″N 7°43′18″E

Ibbenbüren
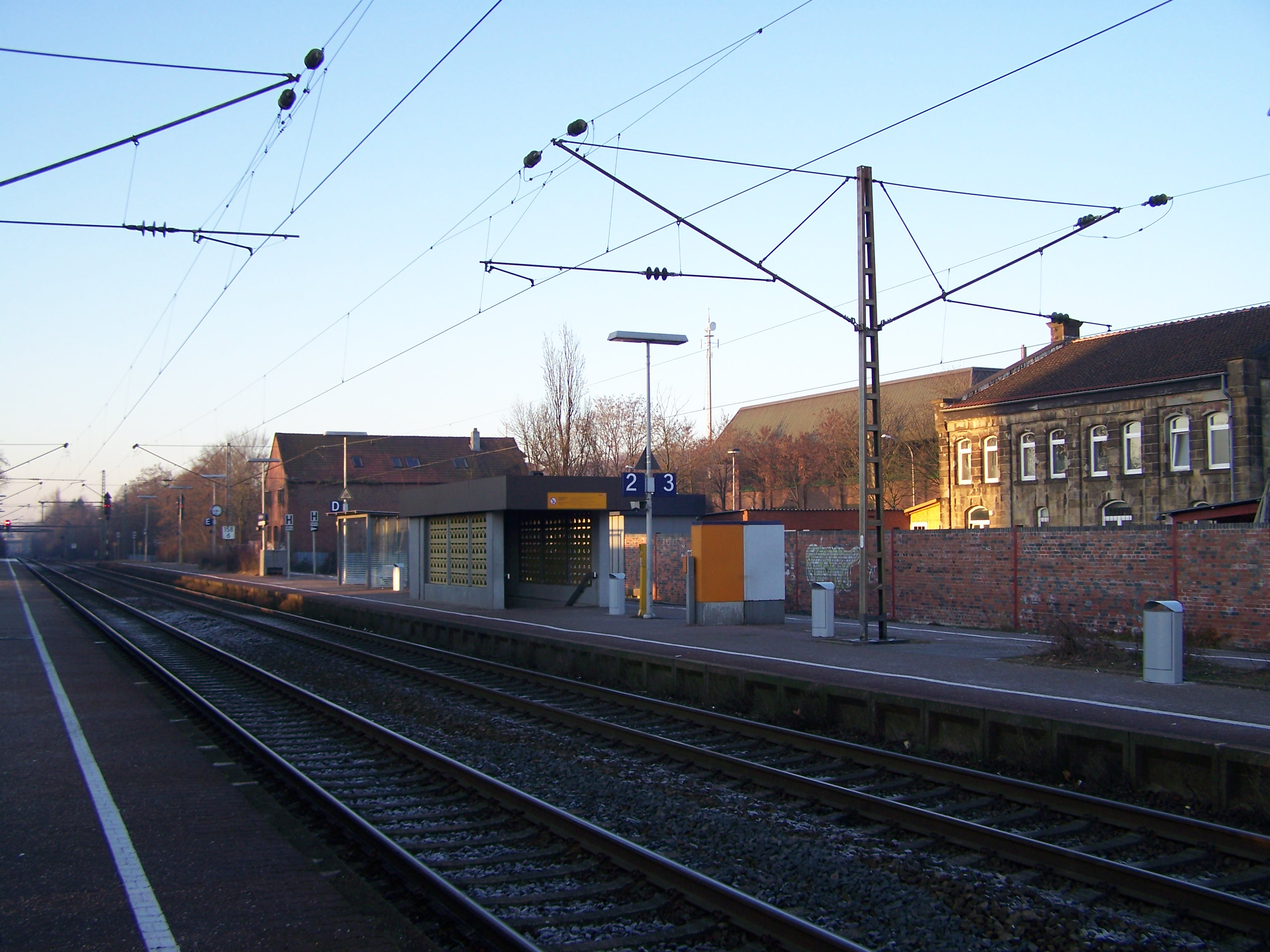
- Ibbenbüren station

General information
- Location: Ibbenbüren, NRW; Germany
- Line: Löhne–Rheine railway
- Platforms: 3

Construction
- Accessible: No

Other information
- Station code: n/a
- Category: 5
- Fare zone: Westfalentarif: 51031
- Website: www.bahnhof.de

History
- Opened: 1856

Services
| Preceding station | | Following station |
|---|---|---|
| Ibbenbüren-Esch towards Rheine | RE 60 | Ibbenbüren-Laggenbeck towards Braunschweig Hbf |
| Preceding station | DB Regio Nord | Following station |
| Rheine Terminus | RE 62 | Osnabrück Altstadt towards Löhne (Westfalen) |
| Preceding station | | Following station |
| Ibbenbüren-Esch towards Hengelo | RB 61 | Ibbenbüren-Laggenbeck towards Bielefeld Hbf |
Location

Ibbenbüren is a railway station located in Ibbenbüren, Germany. The station was opened on 28 June 1856 is located on the Löhne–Rheine line. The train services are operated by WestfalenBahn.

== Train services ==
The station is served by the following services:

- Regional services RE 60 Rheine - Osnabrück - Minden - Hanover - Braunschweig
- Regional services RE 62 Rheine - Osnabrück - Löhne
- Local services RB 61 Bad Bentheim - Rheine - Osnabrück - Herford - Bielefeld

== Bus services ==
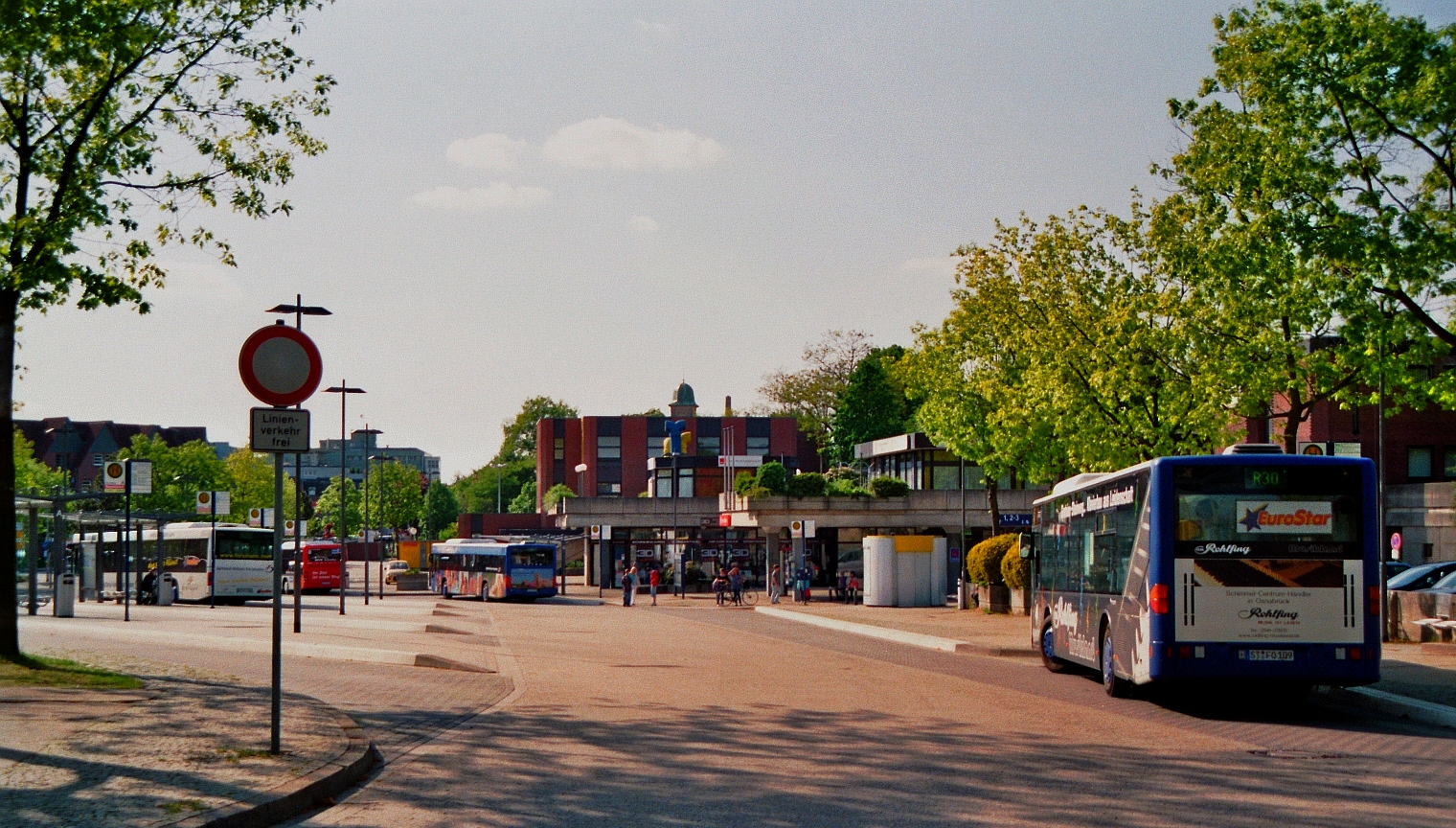
Ibbenbüren bus station

There is a bus station outside the station.
