= Bassum–Herford railway =

Railway line in Germany

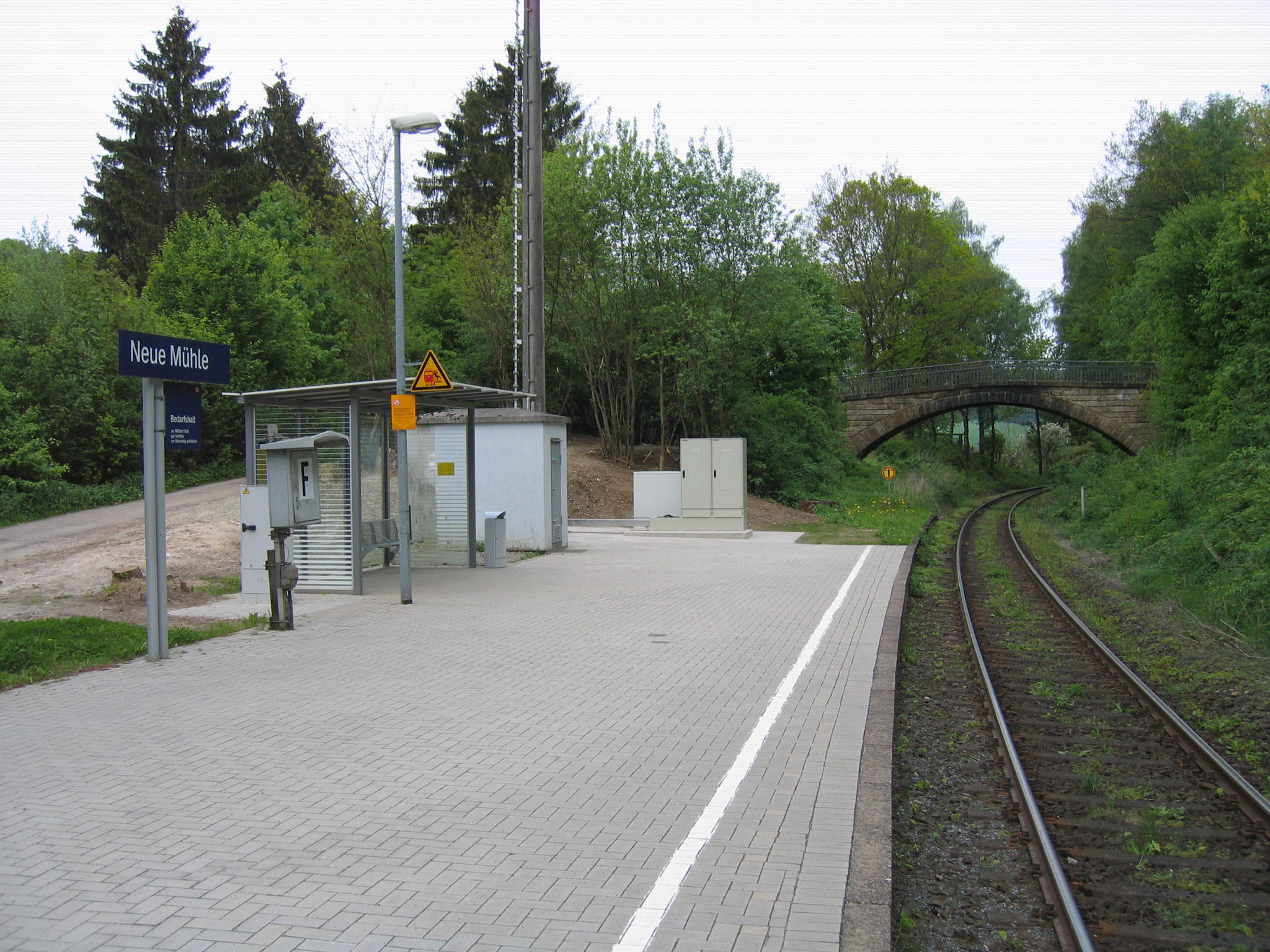
- The station platform at Rödinghausen in 2010

Overview
- Line number: 2981 (Herford–Kirchlengern); 2992 (Kirchlengern–Bünde); 2982 (Bünde–Bassum)
- Locale: Lower Saxony, North Rhine-Westphalia

Service
- Route number: 386

Technical
- Line length: 101 km (63 mi)
- Track gauge: 1,435 mm (4 ft 8 1/2 in) standard gauge
- Electrification: Herford–Bünde: 15 kV/16.7 Hz AC overhead catenary
- Operating speed: Herford–Kirchlengern: 100 km/h (62.1 mph); Bünde–Bassum: 80 km/h (49.7 mph); Kirchlengern–Bünde: 140 km/h (87.0 mph) (maximums)
Route map
Operating points and lines

The Bassum–Herford Railway is a now partially disused railway line from Herford in the German state of North Rhine-Westphalia via Bünde to Bassum in Lower Saxony.

The middle section between Bünde and Rahden is a single-track branch line, the southern section between Kirchlengern and Herford is also single-track, but has been electrified. Both parts are now operated as the Ravensberger Bahn (Ravensberg Railway), which continues to Bielefeld.

The northern section of the line from Rahden to Bassum is closed except for a short section between Barenburg and Sulingen, which is used only for freight traffic.

== History ==
The first plans were published for a branch line from the Hamm–Minden railway of the Cologne-Minden Railway Company from Minden via Lübbecke to Osnabrück in about 1845. These found no support in conservative circles. In 1867, a new project was presented for a line on the Karlshafen–Herford–Bünde–Lübbecke–Lemförde route.

More concrete plans were published on 5 March 1872 for a line from Bünde to Rahden, branching off the Löhne–Rheine railway, which was opened on 21 November 1855. But planning for a single-track branch line from Bünde to Rahden was finally approved by the Prussian minister for public works in 1892. Five years later, on 22 February 1887, ground was broken and, on 30 September 1899, the first services were operated on the railway by two special trains, which could be used free of charge. The Prussian state railways began regular operations the next day.

By 29 September 1900, the line had been extended to the north-east to Sulingen and from 1 August 1901 there were continuous services from Bünde via Rahden and Sulingen to Bassum on the Bremen–Münster main line.

On 1 July 1904 the line was extended to the south with the construction of a single-track connection between Kirchlengern and Herford on the Hamm–Minden railway, using the tracks of the Löhne–Rheine line from Bünde to Kirchlengern. This section of the line, unlike the northern section, was electrified in the 1970s to allow electrically-hauled traffic to transfer between the two main lines. The electrification was completed on 20 September 1976.

Further branch lines were built. The first section of the Wittlage District Railway (Wittlager Kreisbahn) from Holzhausen-Heddinghausen to Bohmte with a connection to the Münster–Osnabrück–Bremen main line, was opened on 9 August 1900, and the Nienburg–Rahden railway was opened on 15 January 1910.

Subsequently the engine shed in Rahden was extended and the locomotive depot became a locomotive workshop.

The Second World War also left its mark. On the night of 1/2 April 1945, the bridge was over the Mittelland Canal between Gestringen and Luebbecke was blown up. But through traffic was able to run on 1 March 1946.

From January 1950 express trains from Bremerhaven-Lehe to Frankfurt via Bremen, Herford, Paderborn, Korbach and Marburg used this route. This service was also called an Heckeneilzug (“hedgerow express”).

The last steam train ran as a shuttle between Sulingen and Bünde on 5 and 6 October 1974.

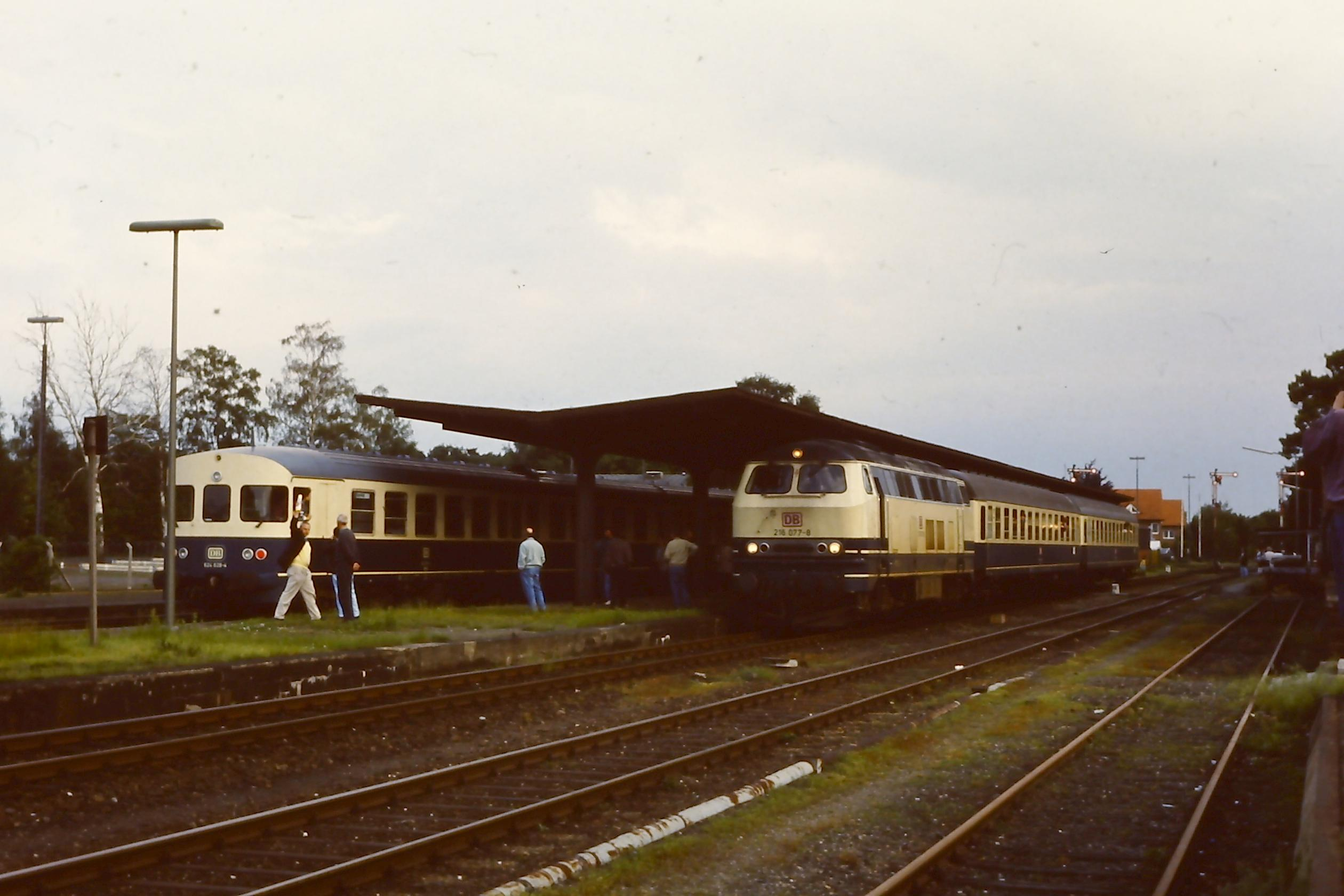
Sulingen station on the last day of operations (1 June 1994)

On 1 June 1994, the last remaining pair of trains ran on the Bielefeld–Bassum–Bremen route and therefore all passenger traffic ended between Rahden and Bassum. The carriage of freight ended on 3 June 1994, except on the Sulingen–Barenburg section. DB Cargo has continued to operate traffic on the section of the line from Diepholz via Sulingen to Barenburg for ExxonMobil. There are plans to create a connecting curve at Sulingen between the lines to Diepholz and Barenburg, providing a bypass of Sulingen. The grounds of the disused Sulinger station with its formerly extensive track systems would be redeveloped. The remaining line was closed on 31 December 1997.

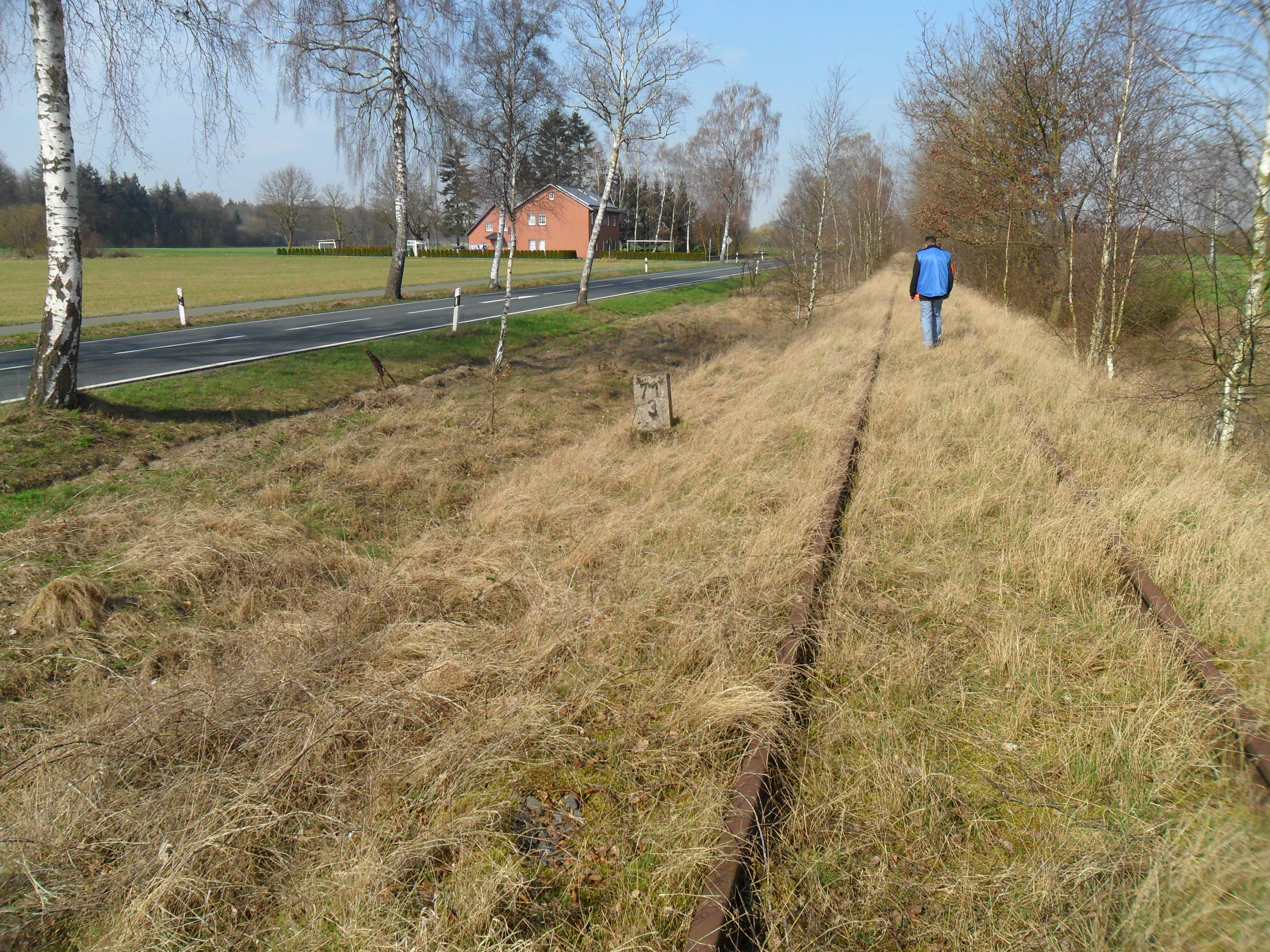
Between Sulingen and Schwaförden (March 2012)

A bottleneck in the federal trunk road network (B61) was eliminated at the existing railway overpass at Bassum with the partial removal of the embankment in the autumn of 2009. In Ströhen a hall has been built over the track. In the Sulingen area several level crossings were eliminated, in some cases during the construction of relief roads. The level crossing on the B61 in Neuenkirchen has also been removed. The other sections are now mostly overgrown with scrub.

Nevertheless, the Verein Aktionsbündnis Eisenbahnstrecke Bassum-Bünde, founded in 2010, has submitted a plan for the reactivation of the line.

Passenger services on the Bünde–Rahden section are now operated as part of Deutsche Bahn’s Münster-Ostwestfalen (MOW) regional network, based in Münster.

== Current operations ==
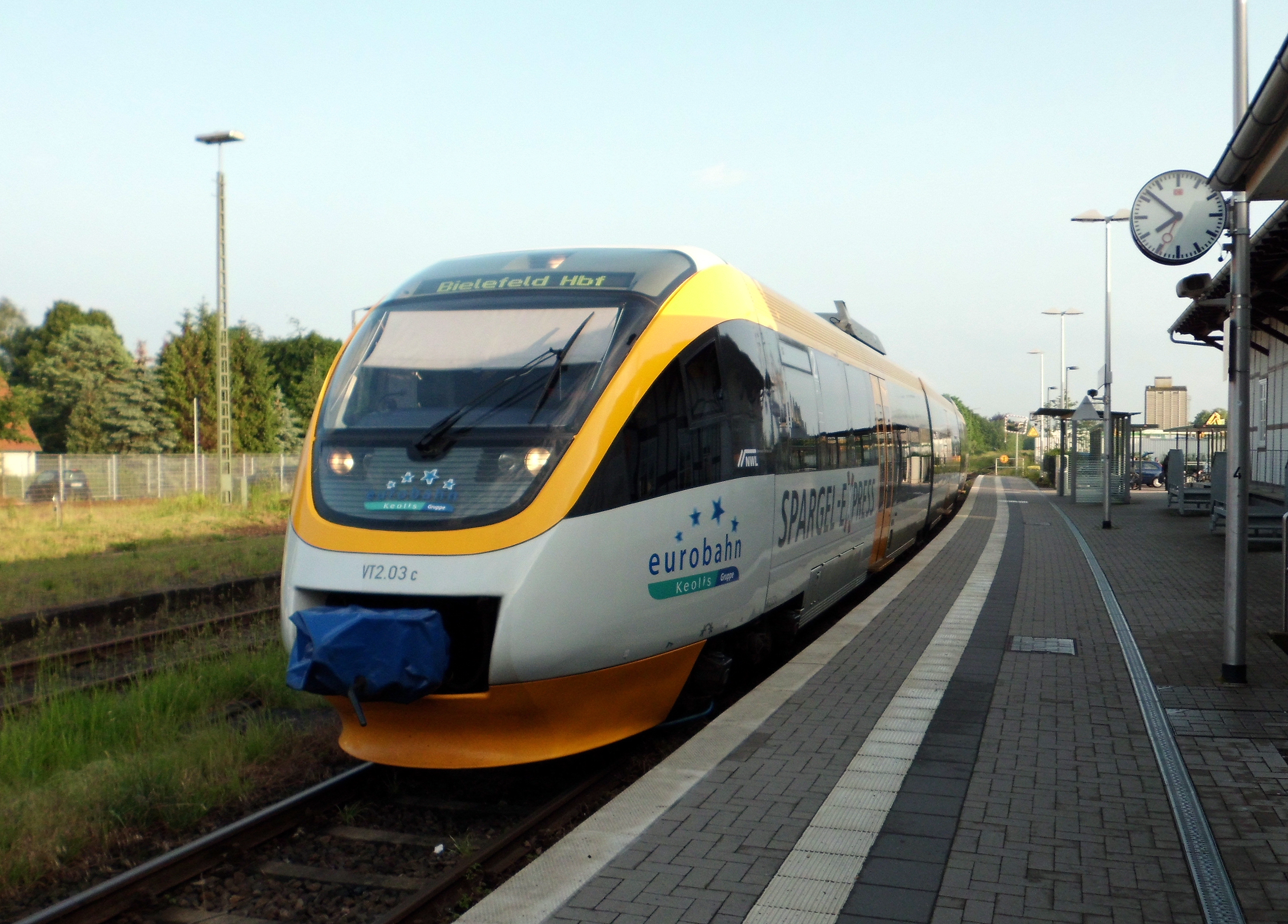
Eurobahn-Talent in Rahden station

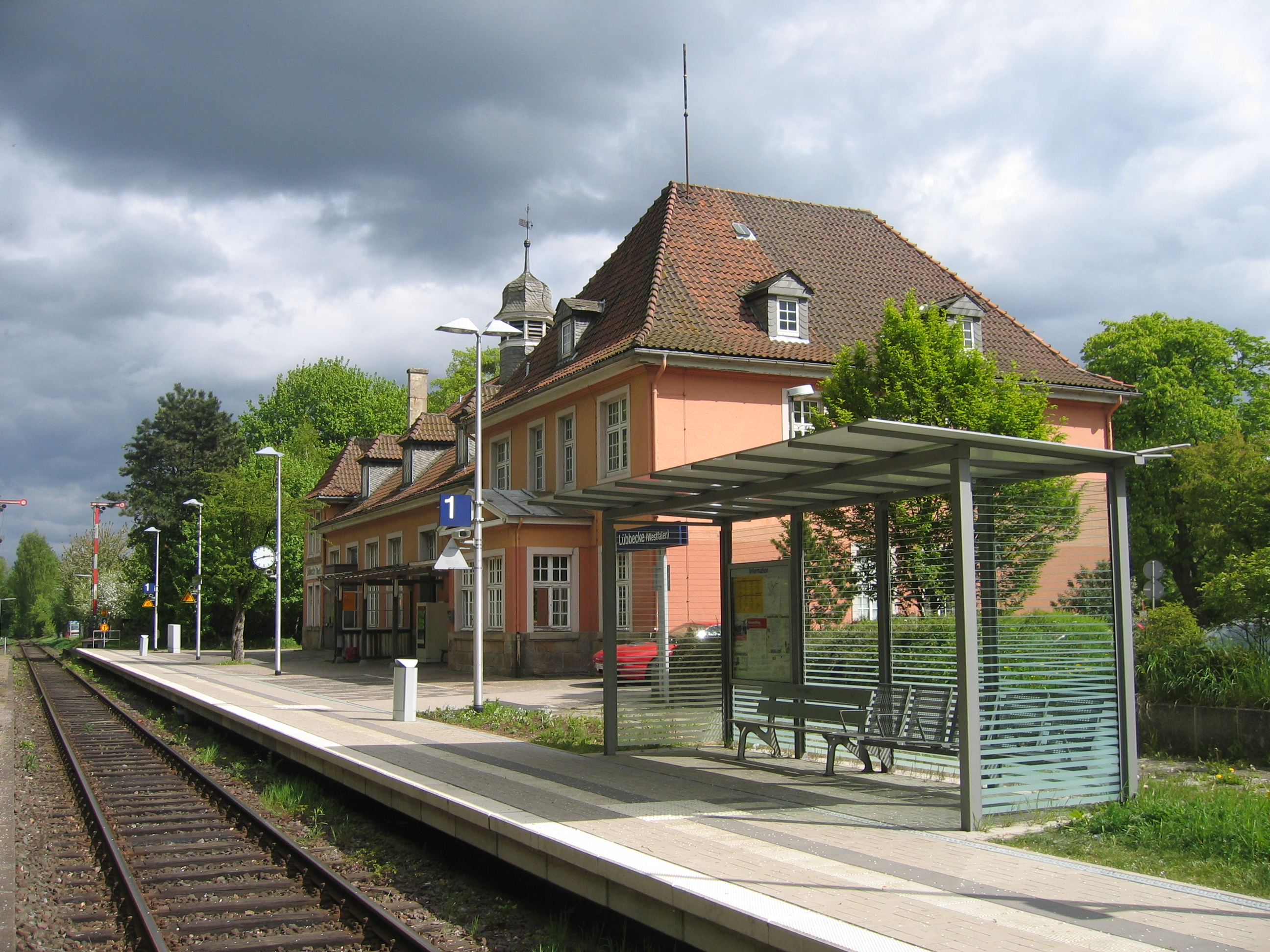
Lübbecke station

The route between Rahden and Herford is served by Regionalbahn service RB 71 (Ravensberger Bahn) train at hourly intervals on working days with trains crossing in Holzhausen-Heddinghausen at the symmetry minute of 28 minutes past the hour; on Sundays services run every two hours. The trains continue to Bielefeld Hbf and from there operate as the RB 67 (Der Warendorfer) to Münster Hbf so that a change of trains is only necessary when rollingstock are replaced.

The service is operated by Eurobahn with Bombardier Talent diesel railcars at speeds of up to 120 km/h. The whole line can be used with the Sechser-Tarif (“the six” fares) of the Zweckverband Verkehrsverbund OWL (transport association of Ostwestfalen-Lippe) and the NRW-tariff (fares) of North Rhine-Westphalia.

=== Freight traffic ===
The short central section between Sulingen and Barenburg is now used for freight transport by DB Schenker Rail for traffic running between Diepholz and the facilities of the ExxonMobil company at Barenburg. In Lübbecke a siding branches off to the BESTA company near the Mittelland canal. This siding is used regularly. Part of this traffic consists of trains carrying wire rolls to the BESTA site.

=== Draisine operations ===
Between Rahden and Ströhen there is now a Draisine operation for tourists. Ströhen includes a well-developed tourist railway, which also operates Draisines on a former narrow-gauge railway used for peat extraction on Neustädter Moor.
