= List of regional railway lines in North Rhine-Westphalia =

Map of the regional rail network in North Rhine-Westphalia. S-Bahn routes are shown in orange, RegionalBahn routes are shown in blue, and RegionalExpress routes are shown in red.

The List of regional rail lines in North Rhine-Westphalia provides a list of all Regional-Express and Regionalbahn railway lines in North Rhine-Westphalia. The passenger rail service in North Rhine-Westphalia is one of the densest train services in Germany, comprising 100 million train kilometers and is mainly operated on an integrated timetable, which has been in effect since 1998 with the introduction its current version, known as 1998 NRW-Takt.

== Timetable ==
The examples of the NRW integrated timetable given here are solely to illustrate the system. They do not include the regional rail to tram and railway lines. Pure tram routes are consequently not included in this list. Current information can be obtained from the responsible transport associations (VRR and VRS).

The timetable is predominantly based on zero symmetry. Concretely, this means that the trains on the lines with hourly service meet on the minutes :59 and :29, on the lines with service every two hours just at the minute :59. The departure times of the opposite direction are calculated by mirroring the arrival times at the minute :58.5.

All the lines provide connections to hub stations and their connection with local transport.

Some lines are interconnected, for example the RB 71 with the RB 73 or the RB 67 with the RE 82.

== Regional-Express and Regionalbahn lines ==
Lines in which the state of North Rhine-Westphalia has determined to be in the public interest and necessity are ordered and supported by the state. These are shown with a yellow background.

The specified sub-networks are the units through which the lines are awarded.

=== Lines 1–9 ===
- Lines or sections with a frequency of less than 60 minutes, usually every 30 minutes, are written in **bold**.
- Lines or sections with a frequency of more than 60 minutes, usually every 120 minutes, are written in italics.
- Lines or sections outside North Rhine-Westphalia are written in small.

Line	Line name / Network	Route	Length	KBS	Operator	Rolling stock
RE 1	**NRW-Express**; RRX preliminary network	Aachen – Eschweiler – Düren – Horrem – Cologne – Düsseldorf – Düsseldorf Airport – Duisburg – Essen – Bochum – Dortmund – Hamm	218 km	415, 480	National Express	2× Siemens Desiro HC (462)
RE 2	**Rhein-Haard-Express**; Haard axis	Düsseldorf – Duisburg – Essen – Gelsenkirchen – Recklinghausen – Münster – Lengerich (Westf) – Osnabrück	173 km	425	DB Regio NRW	Alstom Traxx P160 AC1 (146.1) + 5 double-deck coaches 2× Stadler Flirt 3 (1428) (at edge of the day)
RE 3	**Rhein-Emscher-Express**; Maas-Rhein-Lippe Net	Düsseldorf – Düsseldorf Flughafen – Duisburg – Oberhausen – Gelsenkirchen – Herne – Dortmund – Hamm	109 km	416	Eurobahn	1-2x Stadler Flirt (428, 429)
RE 4	**Wupper-Express**; RRX preliminary network	Aachen – Herzogenrath – Rheydt – Mönchengladbach – Neuss – Düsseldorf – Wuppertal – Hagen – Dortmund	171 km	427, 455, 485	National Express	1–2× Siemens Desiro HC (462)
RE 5	**Rhein-Express**; RRX preliminary network	Koblenz – Bonn – Cologne – Düsseldorf – Düsseldorf Flughafen – Duisburg – Oberhausen – Wesel (– Emmerich)	192 km	415, 420, 470	National Express	2× Siemens Desiro HC (462)
RE 6	**Rhein-Weser-Express**; RRX preliminary network	Minden – Herford – Bielefeld – Hamm – Dortmund – Essen – Duisburg – Düsseldorf Airport – Düsseldorf – Neuss – Cologne – Cologne/Bonn Airport	280 km	370, 400, 415	National Express	2× Siemens Desiro HC (462)
RE 7	**Rhein-Münsterland-Express**; Rhein-Wupper-Schiene net	Krefeld – Neuss – Cologne – Solingen – Wuppertal – Hagen – Hamm – Münster – Rheine	248 km	410, 455, 495	National Express	1−2 x Bombardier Talent 2 (9442)
RE 8	**Rhein-Erft-Express**; RE 8/RB 33	Mönchengladbach – Rommerskirchen – Cologne – Porz (Rhein) – Troisdorf – Bonn-Beuel – Bad Honnef – Neuwied – Koblenz	145 km	465	DB Regio NRW	2 x Alstom Coradia Continental (1440)
RE 9	**Rhein-Sieg-Express**; Line awarded individually	Aachen – Eschweiler – Düren – Horrem – Cologne – Troisdorf – Siegburg/Bonn – Au (Sieg) – Siegen	171 km	445, 460, 480	DB Regio NRW	2 x Bombardier Talent 2 (442) (four circuits); Alstom Traxx (146) + 5 or 6 double-deck coaches (four circuits)

=== Lines 10–19 ===
- Lines or sections with a frequency of less than 60 minutes, usually every 30 minutes, are written in **bold**.
- Lines or sections with a frequency of more than 60 minutes, usually every 120 minutes, are written in italics.
- Lines or sections outside North Rhine-Westphalia are written in small.

Line	Line name / Network	Route		Length	KBS	Operator	Rolling stock
RE 10	**Niers-Express**; Niers-Rhine-Emscher	**Düsseldorf – Krefeld – Geldern – Kleve** (only Mo-Fr, Sa/Su hourly)		87 km	495	RheinRuhrBahn	1-3 x Alstom Coradia LINT 41 (648)
RE 11	**Rhein-Hellweg-Express**; Net: NA	Düsseldorf – Düsseldorf Flughafen – Duisburg – Essen – Dortmund – Hamm – Paderborn – Kassel-Wilhelmshöhe		291 km	415, 415, 430	National Express	2× Siemens Desiro (462) to Hamm, otherwise 1× 462
RE 12	**Eifel-Mosel-Express**; Diesel net Köln	Köln – Euskirchen – Gerolstein – Trier (only three pairs of trains per day)		177 km	474	DB Regio NRW	1 × Alstom Coradia LINT 81 (620) + 1 × Bombardier Talent (644)
RE 13	**Maas-Wupper-Express**; Maas-Rhine-Lippe	Venlo – Viersen – Mönchengladbach – Düsseldorf – Wuppertal – Hagen – Hamm		160 km	485, 455	Eurobahn	Stadler Flirt (428/429)
RE 14	**Emscher-Münsterland-Express**; Emscher-Münsterland	**Essen – Bottrop – Gladbeck - Dorsten** split in Dorsten	front part: Dorsten – Borken (Westf)	58 km	423	RheinRuhrBahn	1–2× Stadler Flirt 3 (1428)
RE 14	**Emscher-Münsterland-Express**; Emscher-Münsterland	**Essen – Bottrop – Gladbeck - Dorsten** split in Dorsten	back part: Dorsten – Coesfeld (Westf)	70 km	423	RheinRuhrBahn	1–2× Stadler Flirt 3 (1428)
RE 15	**Emsland-Express**; Emsland/Mittelland	Münster – Rheine – Lingen – Leer – Emden – Emden Außenhafen		183 km	410, 395	WestfalenBahn	1–2× Stadler Flirt 3 (1428)
RE 16	**Ruhr-Lenne-Express**; Ruhr-Sieg	Essen – Bochum – Witten – Hagen – Iserlohn-Letmathe – Iserlohn		72 km	415, 427, 440	VIAS Rail	Stadler Flirt
RE 17	**Sauerland-Express**; Sauerland Net	Hagen – Schwerte – Bestwig – Brilon Wald – Brilon Stadt – (Warburg) (Hagen – Warburg only in the morning)		209 km	435, 430	DB Regio NRW	1× Pesa Link II (632) 1× Pesa Link III (633)
	**LIMAX (Liège-Maastricht-Aachen-Express)**; Concessie Limburg 2016–2031	**Aachen – Herzogenrath – Eygelshoven Markt – Landgraaf – Heerlen – Maastricht** – Liege Guillemins		47 km	482	Arriva Nederland	Stadler Flirt 3 (1428)
RE 19	**Rhein-IJssel-Express**; Niederrhein	Düsseldorf – Düsseldorf Airport – Duisburg – Oberhausen – Wesel split in Wesel	front part: Wesel – Emmerich – Zevenaar – Arnhem	78 km	415, 420, 421	VIAS Rail	1–2× Stadler Flirt 3 (1429)
RE 19	**Rhein-IJssel-Express**; Niederrhein	Düsseldorf – Düsseldorf Airport – Duisburg – Oberhausen – Wesel split in Wesel	back part: Wesel – Hamminkeln – Bocholt	123 km	415, 420, 421	VIAS Rail	1–2× Stadler Flirt 3 (1429)

=== Lines 20–29 ===
- Lines or sections with a frequency of less than 60 minutes, usually every 30 minutes, are written in **bold**.
- Lines or sections with a frequency of more than 60 minutes, usually every 120 minutes, are written in italics.
- Lines or sections outside North Rhine-Westphalia are written in small.

Line	Line name / Network	Route		Length	KBS	Operator	Rolling stock
RB 20	**euregiobahn** Net: NA	Stolberg – Eschweiler Talbahnhof-St. Jöris – Alsdorf Poststraße – **Herzogenrath – Aachen – Stolberg** split in Stolberg	front part: Stolberg – Eschweiler Talbahnhof – Langerwehe – Düren	57 km	482	DB Regio NRW	2−4 x Bombardier Talent (643.2)
RB 20	**euregiobahn** Net: NA	Stolberg – Eschweiler Talbahnhof-St. Jöris – Alsdorf Poststraße – **Herzogenrath – Aachen – Stolberg** split in Stolberg	back part: Stolberg – Stolberg Altstadt	48 km	482	DB Regio NRW	2−4 x Bombardier Talent (643.2)
RB 21 north	**Rurtalbahn** individually awarded	Linnich – **Jülich – Düren**		26 km	457 / 483	Rurtalbahn	Alstom Coradia LINT 54 (622), Stadler Regio-Shuttle RS1 (650)
RB 21 south	**Rurtalbahn** individually awarded	**Düren – Kreuzau – Untermaubach-Schlagstein** – Nideggen-Brück – Heimbach		30 km	484	Rurtalbahn	Alstom Coradia LINT 54 (622), Stadler Regio-Shuttle RS1 (650)
RE 22	**Eifel-Express**; Diesel Net-Köln	Köln – Euskirchen – Gerolstein (– Trier as RB 22)		109 km	474	DB Regio NRW	Alstom Coradia LINT 54 (622), Stadler Regio-Shuttle RS1 (650)
RB 24	**Eifel-Bahn**; Diesel Net-Köln	Köln – Euskirchen – Kall / Gerolstein		109 km	474	DB Regio NRW	Alstom Coradia LINT 81 (620), Alstom Coradia LINT 54 (622)
RB 25	**Oberbergische Bahn**; Diesel Net-Köln	**Köln – Overath** – Gummersbach – Marienheide – Lüdenscheid		97 km	459	DB Regio NRW	Alstom Coradia LINT 81 (620), Alstom Coradia LINT 54 (622)
RB 26	**MittelrheinBahn**; Mittelrhein (West Rhine Railway)	Cologne – Bonn – Remagen – Andernach –Koblenz – Mainz		186 km	470	trans regio	1–3× (from Remagen 1–2×), Siemens Desiro ML (460)
RB 27	**Rhein-Erft-Bahn**; Net: NA	Mönchengladbach – Rommerskirchen – Cologne – Köln/Bonn Flughafen – Troisdorf – Bonn-Beuel – Königswinter – Bad Honnef (Rhein) – Linz am Rhein – Neuwied – Engers – Koblenz		147 km	465	DB Regio NRW	1–2x 425
RB 28	**Eifel-Bördebahn**	Düren – Zülpich – Euskirchen; Every 3 hours on Sats, Suns and public holidays		30 km	12474	Rurtalbahn	1× Stadler regional shuttle RS1 (650)

=== Lines 30–39 ===
- Lines or sections with a frequency of less than 60 minutes, usually every 30 minutes, are written in **bold**.
- Lines or sections with a frequency of more than 60 minutes, usually every 120 minutes, are written in italics.
- Lines or sections outside North Rhine-Westphalia are written in small.

Line	Line name / Network	Route		Length	KBS	Operator	Rolling stock
RB 30	**Rhein-Ahr-Bahn**; Net: NA	Ahrbrück – Remagen – Bonn		50 km	477, 470	DB Regio NRW	Alstom Coradia LINT 81 (620)
RB 31	**Der Niederrheiner**; Niers-Rhein-Emscher-Net	Xanten – **Moers – Duisburg**		44 km	498	RheinRuhrBahn	1–2× Alstom Coradia Lint 41 (648)
RB 32	**Rhein-Emscher-Bahn**; S-Bahn Rhein-Ruhr	Dortmund – Castrop-Rauxel – Herne – Wanne-Eickel – Gelsenkirchen – Essen-Altenessen – Oberhausen – Duisburg		56 km	416	DB Regio NRW	Stadler Flirt 3XL (3427)
RB 33	**Rhein-Niers-Bahn**	Aachen – Lindern split in Lindern	front part: Lindern – Mönchengladbach – Krefeld – Duisburg – Essen Hbf – Essen-Steele (Sundays only to Essen Hbf)	130 km	485	DB Regio NRW	2× Alstom Coradia Continental (1440) (Essen–Aachen 5-part, Heinsberg–Aachen 3-part)
RB 33	**Rhein-Niers-Bahn**	Aachen – Lindern split in Lindern	back part: Lindern – Heinsberg	45 km	485	DB Regio NRW	2× Alstom Coradia Continental (1440) (Essen–Aachen 5-part, Heinsberg–Aachen 3-part)
RE 34 (IC 34)	Dortmund-Siegerland-Express	Dortmund – Witten – Iserlohn-Letmathe – Altena – Werdohl – Plettenberg – Finnentrop – Lennestadt-Grevenbrück – Lennestadt-Altenhundem – Kirchhundem-Welschen Ennest – Kreuztal – Siegen-Weidenau – Siegen – Dillenburg; DB Regio: runs approx. every two hours Dortmund – Siegen, operated as DB Fernverkehr: Intercity trains, which are open to local traffic, leave approx. every two hours on the Dortmund – Frankfurt route and Hessische Landesbahn: individual services between Letmathe and Siegen		161 km	427, 440, 445	DB Regio NRW; DB Fernverkehr; Hessische Landesbahn	Flirt 3XL (3427); IC2 (147.5); LINT 41 (1648)
RB 34	**Schwalm-Nette-Bahn**; Net: NA	Mönchengladbach – Wegberg – Dalheim (every two hours on weekends)		24 km	487	VIAS	Alstom Coradia LINT 41 (1648)
RB 35	**Emscher-Niederrhein-Bahn**; Niederrhein-Netz	Gelsenkirchen – Essen-Altenessen – Oberhausen – Duisburg – Krefeld – Viersen – Mönchengladbach (only Monday to Friday)		70 km	490, 416	VIAS	Stadler Flirt 3 (1429)
RB 36	**Ruhrort-Bahn**; Niers-Rhein-Emscher-Net	**Oberhausen Hbf – Duisburg-Meiderich – Duisburg-Ruhrort** (hourly on weekends)		9 km	447	NordWestBahn	Alstom Coradia LINT 41 (648)
RB 38	**Erft-Bahn**; Dieselnetz Köln	**Bedburg (Erft) – Horrem** – Cologne Hbf – Köln Messe/Deutz (hourly on weekends)		36 km	481	DB Regio NRW	1–2× Bombardier Talent (644)
RB 39	**Düssel-Erft-Bahn**; Erft-Schwalm	Düsseldorf Hbf – **Neuss Hbf – Grevenbroich** – Bedburg (Erft) (hourly weekends and only between Neuss Hbf and Bedburg, except at night)		35 km	488	VIAS	Alstom Coradia LINT 41 (1648), Alstom Coradia LINT 54 (622)
RB 39	**Ahrtalbahn**; Dieselnetz Köln	Remagen – Dernau		19 km	477	DB RegioNRW	Alstom Coradia LINT 54 (622)

=== Lines 40–49 ===
- Lines or sections with a frequency of less than 60 minutes, usually every 30 minutes, are written in **bold**.
- Lines or sections with a frequency of more than 60 minutes, usually every 120 minutes, are written in italics.
- Lines or sections outside North Rhine-Westphalia are written in small.

Line	Line name / Network	Route	Length	KBS	Operator	Rolling stock
RB 40	**Ruhr-Lenne-Bahn**; Rhine-Ruhr S-Bahn	Essen – Bochum – Witten – Hagen	45 km	415, 427	DB Regio NRW	Stadler Flirt 3XL (3429)
RE 41	**Vest-Ruhr-Express**; Rhine-Ruhr S-Bahn	Bochum – Recklinghausen – Marl-Sinsen – Haltern am See			DB Regio NRW	Stadler Flirt 3XL (3427)
RE 42	**Niers-Haard-Express**; Haard-Achse	Münster – Haltern am See – Recklinghausen – Gelsenkirchen – Essen – Mülheim – Duisburg – Krefeld – Viersen – Mönchengladbach	143 km	425	DB Regio NRW	1–2× Stadler Flirt 3 (1428); Bombardier Traxx P160 AC1 (146.1) + 4 bi-level coaches
RB 43	**Emschertal-Bahn**; Sauerland Net	Dorsten - Gladbeck - Wanne-Eickel – Herne – Dortmund	53 km	426	DB Regio NRW	1× Pesa Link II (632); 1× Pesa Link III (633)
RE 44	**Fossa-Emscher-Express**; Niers-Rhein-Emscher	Bottrop – Oberhausen – Duisburg – Moers (route length: 36 km) (Bottrop–Duisburg only on weekends)	36 km	423, 498	RheinRuhrBahn	1–2× Alstom Coradia LINT 41 (648)
RB 46	**Glückauf-Bahn**; Emscher-Ruhrtal	**Gelsenkirchen – Wanne-Eickel – Bochum** (Sat/Sun hourly)	16 km	428	DB Regio NRW	1–2× class426
RE 47	**Düssel-Wupper-Express** (allocated directly)	Düsseldorf – Hilden – Solingen – Remscheid Hbf – Remscheid-Lennep	41 km	450.1, 450.7	Regiobahn	Integral S5D95
RB 48	**Rhein-Wupper-Bahn**; Rhein-Wupper-Schiene	Bonn-Mehlem – Bonn Hbf – **Köln – Solingen – Wuppertal**	97 km	455, 470	National Express	1–2× Bombardier Talent 2 (9442) class 110 + 5 n-coaches (1 cycle Mon–Fri)
RE 49	**Wupper-Lippe-Express**; S-Bahn Rhein-Ruhr	Wuppertal – Velbert-Neviges – Essen – Mülheim – Oberhausen – Wesel (Mon to Fri)	86 km	420, 450.3, 450.9	DB Regio NRW	Stadler Flirt 3XL (3427)

=== Lines 50–59 ===
- Lines or sections with a frequency of less than 60 minutes, usually every 30 minutes, are written in **bold**.
- Lines or sections with a frequency of more than 60 minutes, usually every 120 minutes, are written in italics.
- Lines or sections outside North Rhine-Westphalia are written in small.

Line	Line name / Network	Route		Length	KBS	Operator	Rolling stock
RB 50	**Der Lüner**; Hellweg Net	Dortmund – Lünen – Münster		55 km	411	Eurobahn	1–2× Stadler Flirt 3 (1429)
RB 51	**Westmünsterland-Bahn**; Line awarded individually	**Dortmund – Lünen** – Coesfeld – Gronau – Enschede (NL)		105 km	412	DB Regio NRW	1–3× Bombardier Talent (643)
RB 52	**Volmetal-Bahn**; Sauerland Net	Dortmund – Hagen – Schalksmühle – Lüdenscheid		54 km	434	DB Regio NRW	1× Pesa Link II (632); 1× Pesa Link III (633); 1× Alstom Coradia LINT 41 (648)
RB 53	**Ardey-Bahn**; Sauerland Net	**Dortmund – Schwerte** – Iserlohn		39 km	433	DB Regio NRW	1× Pesa Link II (632)
RB 54	**Hönnetal-Bahn**; Sauerland Net	Unna – Fröndenberg – Menden – Balve – Neuenrade		39 km	437	DB Regio NRW	1× Pesa Link II (632)
RE 57	**Dortmund-Sauerland-Express**; Sauerland Net	Dortmund – Fröndenberg – Arnsberg – Meschede – Bestwig; Split in Bestwig to Warburg or every two hours to Winterberg (in the evening via Schwerte as a train coupled with RB 53)	Bestwig – Winterberg	115 km	435, 438	DB Regio NRW	1–2× Pesa Link II (632); 1–2× Pesa Link III (633)
RE 57	**Dortmund-Sauerland-Express**; Sauerland Net	Dortmund – Fröndenberg – Arnsberg – Meschede – Bestwig; Split in Bestwig to Warburg or every two hours to Winterberg (in the evening via Schwerte as a train coupled with RB 53)	Bestwig – Warburg	110 km	435	DB Regio NRW	1–2× Pesa Link II (632); 1–2× Pesa Link III (633)
RB 58	**Der Bramscher**; Weser-Ems	Osnabrück – Halen – Bramsche – Vechta – Delmenhorst – Bremen		126 km	394	NordWestBahn	1–3× Alstom Coradia LINT 41 (648)
RB 59	**Hellweg-Bahn**; Hellweg	**Dortmund – Unna – Soest**		54 km	431	Eurobahn	Stadler Flirt (428)

=== Lines 60–69 ===
- Lines or sections with a frequency of less than 60 minutes, usually every 30 minutes, are written in **bold**.
- Lines or sections with a frequency of more than 60 minutes, usually every 120 minutes, are written in italics.
- Lines or sections outside North Rhine-Westphalia are written in small.

Line	Line name / Network	Route	Length	KBS	Operator	Rolling stock
RE 60	**Ems-Leine-Express**; Elektronetz Mittelland	Rheine – Ibbenbüren – Osnabrück – Bünde – Minden – Hannover – Braunschweig	270 km	310, 370, 375	WestfalenBahn	Stadler KISS
RB 61	**Wiehengebirgs-Bahn**; Teutoburger Wald Network	Hengelo – Bad Bentheim – Rheine – Ibbenbüren – Osnabrück – Herford – Bielefeld	160 km	375, 386, 370	Eurobahn	Stadler Flirt (2429; multi-system D/NL)
RE 62	**Ems-Werre-Express**	Rheine – Ibbenbüren – Osnabrück – Bünde – Löhne	95 km	375	DB Regio Nord	Alstom Coradia Continental (440)
RB 63	**Baumberge-Bahn**; Münster West Network	Münster – Coesfeld	44 km	408	DB Regio NRW	1–2 × Bombardier Talent (643)
RB 64	**Euregio-Bahn**; Münster West Network	Münster – Gronau – Enschede	65 km	407	DB Regio NRW	1−3 x Bombardier Talent (643)
RB 65	**Ems-Bahn**; Teutoburger Wald Network	Münster – Greven – Emsdetten – Rheine	39 km	410	Eurobahn	Stadler Flirt (427/429, sometimes both)
RB 66	**Teuto-Bahn**; Teutoburger Wald Network	Münster – Lengerich (Westf) – Osnabrück	50 km	385	Eurobahn	Stadler Flirt (427/429, sometimes both)
RB 67	**Der Warendorfer**; OWL Diesel Network	Münster – Warendorf – Gütersloh – Bielefeld	76 km	400, 406	Eurobahn	1–2 × Bombardier Talent (643)
RB 69	**Ems-Börde-Bahn**; Hellweg Network	Münster – Hamm – Bielefeld	102 km	400, 410	Eurobahn	Stadler Flirt (428)

=== Lines 70–79 ===
- Lines or sections with a frequency of less than 60 minutes, usually every 30 minutes, are written in **bold**.
- Lines or sections with a frequency of more than 60 minutes, usually every 120 minutes, are written in italics.
- Lines or sections outside North Rhine-Westphalia are written in small.

Line	Line name / Network	Route	Length	KBS	Operator	Rolling stock
RE 70	**Weser-Leine-Express**; Mittelland Electric Network	Bielefeld – Herford – Minden – Hannover – Braunschweig	169 km	310, 370, 401	WestfalenBahn	Stadler KISS
RB 71	**Ravensberger Bahn**; OWL Diesel Network	Bielefeld – Herford – Bünde – Rahden	61 km	386	Eurobahn	1−2 x Bombardier Talent (643)
RB 72	**Ostwestfalen-Bahn**; Teutoburger Wald Network	Herford – Lage – Detmold – Altenbeken – Paderborn	74 km	405, 429	Eurobahn	Stadler Flirt (427)
RB 73	**Der Lipperländer**; OWL Diesel Network	Bielefeld – Lage (Lippe) – Lemgo	31 km	404	Eurobahn	1–2× Bombardier Talent (643)
RB 74	**Senne-Bahn**; OWL Diesel Network	Bielefeld – Sennestadt – Paderborn	44 km	403	NordWestBahn	1–2× Bombardier Talent (643)
RB 75	**Haller Willem**; OWL Diesel Network	**Bielefeld – Halle (Westf.)** – Osnabrück	57 km	402	NordWestBahn	1−2 x 643 (120 km/h)
RB 77	**Weser Bahn**; Weser Railway/Lamme Valley Railway Network	Bünde – Löhne – Rinteln – Hamelin – Elze – Hildesheim	110 km	372	DB Start	1–2× Alstom Coradia LINT 41 (648)
RE 78	**Porta-Express**; Network: NA	Bielefeld – Herford – Löhne – Minden – Nienburg	98 km	370, 124	Eurobahn	Stadler Flirt (427/428/429); Stadler Flirt 3 (2429)

=== Lines 80–89 ===
- Lines or sections with a frequency of less than 60 minutes, usually every 30 minutes, are written in **bold**.
- Lines or sections with a frequency of more than 60 minutes, usually every 120 minutes, are written in italics.
- Lines or sections outside North Rhine-Westphalia are written in small.

Line	Line name / Network	Route	Length	KBS	Operator	Rolling stock
RE 82	**Der Leineweber**; DerOWL diesel network	Bielefeld – Lage (Lippe) – Detmold – Altenbeken (every two hours on Sundays)	56 km	404, 405	Eurobahn	1 x Bombardier Talent (643)
RB 84	**Egge-Bahn**; DerOWL diesel network	Paderborn – Höxter-Ottbergen – Holzminden; Split in Höxter-Ottbergen, part of the train to Göttingen runs as RB 85	111 km	403	NordWestBahn	1–2× Bombardier Talent (643)
RB 85	**Oberweser-Bahn**; DerOWL diesel network	Höxter-Ottbergen – Bodenfelde – Göttingen – Kreiensen split in Höxter-Ottbergen, part of the train to Holzminden/Kreiensen runs as RB 84	112 km	356 Süd, 356 Nord	NorthWestBahn	1–2× Bombardier Talent (643)
RB 89	**Ems-Börde-Bahn**; Hellweg-Net	**Münster – Hamm – Paderborn** – Warburg; Hourly split in Hamm. Part of the train to Bielefeld runs as RB 69	168 km	410, 430	Eurobahn	1–2 x Stadler Flirt (428)

=== Lines 90–99 ===
- Lines or sections with a frequency of less than 60 minutes, usually every 30 minutes, are written in **bold**.
- Lines or sections with a frequency of more than 60 minutes, usually every 120 minutes, are written in italics.
- Lines or sections outside North Rhine-Westphalia are written in small.

Line	Line name / Network	Route	Length	KBS	Operator	Rolling stock
RB 90	**Westerwald-Sieg-Bahn**; Dieselnetz Eifel-Westerwald-Sieg	Limburg (Lahn) – Westerburg – Altenkirchen (Westerwald) – Au (Sieg) – Betzdorf (Sieg) – Siegen (– Kreuztal) peak amplifier between Altenkirchen and Betzdorf, some services stop in Altenkirchen	113 km (to Siegen)	460, 461	Hessische Landesbahn	Alstom Coradia LINT (648), occasionally class 640)
RB 91	**Ruhr-Sieg-Bahn**; Ruhr-Sieg-Netz	Hagen – Iserlohn-Letmathe – (Finnentrop – Siegen) / Iserlohn (every two hours on Sundays and public holidays during the day only between Hagen and Siegen, hourly from 9 p.m. to Siegen and Iserlohn) (currently public transport without train division; from/to Iserlohn always with a change in Letmathe)	106 km to Siegen, 27 km to Iserlohn	440	DB Regio NRW,	2× (from 1 portion each) Stadler Flirt (mostly 426.1 to Iserlohn and 427 to Siegen, rarely 2× 426.1 or 2× 427)
RB 91	**Ruhr-Sieg-Bahn**; Ruhr-Sieg-Netz	Hagen – Iserlohn-Letmathe – (Finnentrop – Siegen) / Iserlohn (every two hours on Sundays and public holidays during the day only between Hagen and Siegen, hourly from 9 p.m. to Siegen and Iserlohn) (currently public transport without train division; from/to Iserlohn always with a change in Letmathe)	106 km to Siegen, 27 km to Iserlohn	440	Hessische Landesbahn	Alstom Coradia LINT 27 (640); Alstom Coradia LINT 41 (648)
RB 92	**Biggesee-Express**; Dieselnetz Eifel-Westerwald-Sieg	Finnentrop – Olpe	24 km	442	Hessische Landesbahn	Alstom Coradia LINT 27 (640); Alstom Coradia LINT 41 (648)
RB 93	Rothaar-Bahn; Dieselnetz Eifel-Westerwald-Sieg	Betzdorf (Sieg) – Siegen – Kreuztal – Hilchenbach – Erndtebrück – Bad Berleburg	75 km (from Betzdorf) (every two hours between Betzdorf and Siegen on Sundays and public holidays)	460, 443	Hessische Landesbahn	Alstom Coradia LINT 41 (648/1648) (some LINT 41+LINT27)
RB 94	**Obere Lahntalbahn**; Net: NA	Erndtebrück – Bad Laasphe – Marburg (every two hours on Sundays and public holidays on the entire route, two pairs of trains extended to Betzdorf on Saturdays)	64 km (from Erndtebrück)	623	Kurhessenbahn	Siemens Desiro Classic (642)
RB 95	**Sieg-Dill-Bahn**; Dieselnetz Eifel-Westerwald-Sieg	Siegen – Wilnsdorf-Rudersdorf – Dillenburg (every two hours, runs only Monday to Saturday)	32 km	445	Hessische Landesbahn	Alstom Coradia LINT 41 (1648); Alstom Coradia Continental (1440)
RB 96	**Hellertal-Bahn**; Dieselnetz Eifel-Westerwald-Sieg	Betzdorf (Sieg) – Neunkirchen – Burbach – Haiger – Dillenburg (every two hours, runs only Monday to Saturday)	42 km	462	Hessische Landesbahn	Alstom Coradia LINT 41 (1648)
RB 97	**Daadetal-Bahn** allocated directly	Betzdorf (Sieg) – Daaden (runs exclusively in Rhineland-Palatinate)		463	Westerwaldbahn	1–2× Stadler GTW (646)
RE 97; RB 97	**Lahn-Sauerland-Express**; Nordwesthessen-Netz	Brilon Stadt – Brilon Wald – Willingen – Korbach – Frankenberg – Marburg (services that do not stop at all stations, run as RE 97)	102 km	439, 622	DB Regio	Siemens Desiro Classic (642)
RE 99	**Main-Sieg-Express**; RE 40 in Hessen	Siegen – Haiger - Dillenburg - Herborn - Wetzlar - Gießen - Friedberg - Frankfurt (Main) Hbf (hourly to Frankfurt only with change in Gießen / 1 train in the morning from Au)	139 km	445, 630	Hessische Landesbahn	Stadler Flirt (429) (Gießen–Frankfurt: 2× 429; peak: 3× 429; Sprinter 429+427)

== S-Bahn services ==
=== S-Bahn Rhein-Ruhr(/Sieg) ===
as of December 2020

- The S-Bahn Lines operate on weekdays at 20 or 30-minute intervals and on weekends at 30-minute intervals.
- Lines or sections with a frequency of more than 20 minutes, usually at 10-minute intervals, are written in **bold**.
- Lines or sections with a frequency of less than 20 minutes, usually at 60-minute intervals, are written in italics.

The DB Regio NRW is the operator of all S-Bahn Rhein-Ruhr and Cologne S-Bahn lines, with the exception of the S28, which is operated by Regiobahn GmbH and the S7 which are operated by Vias Rail.

Line	Route	KBS	Rolling stock
S1	Dortmund – Bochum – Essen – Mülheim (Ruhr) – Duisburg – Dusseldorf Airport – Dusseldorf – Hilden – Solingen	450.1	2 x 422
S2	Dortmund – Castrop Rauxel – Herne – Recklinghausen; Dortmund – Castrop Rauxel – Herne – Wanne-Eickel – Gelsenkirchen – Essen	450.2	Stadler FLIRT 3XL
S3	Oberhausen (Rhineland) – Mülheim (Ruhr) – Essen – Hattingen (Ruhr)	450.3	Stadler FLIRT 3XL
S4	Unna – Unna Königsborn – Dortmund Stadthaus – Dortmund Dorstfeld – Dortmund Lütgendortmund	450.4	422
S5	Dortmund – Witten – Wetter (Ruhr) – Hagen (Westphalia)	450.5	1440
S6	Essen – Ratingen Ost – Dusseldorf – Dusseldorf Benrath – Dusseldorf Garath – Langenfeld (Rhineland) – Leverkusen – CologneMesse/Deutz – Cologne – Cologne Nippes – Cologne Worringen	450.6	2× 422; 2× 423 (two sets)
S7	Wuppertal – Wuppertal Oberbarmen – Remscheid – Solingen	458	648
S8	Hagen (Westpahlia) – Gevelsberg – Schwelm – Wuppertal Oberbarmen – Wuppertal – Wuppertal Vohwinkel – Dusseldorf – Dusseldorf Bilk – Neuss – Mönchengladbach	450.8	1–2× 1440
S9	Recklinghausen / Haltern am See – Gladbeck - Bottrop – Essen – Velbert – Wuppertal – Schwelm – Gevelsberg – Hagen	450.9	Stadler FLIRT 3XL
S11	Dusseldorf Airport Terminal – Dusseldorf – Dusseldorf Bilk – Neuss – Dormagen – Cologne Longerich – Cologne Nippes – Cologne – Cologne Messe/Deutz – Bergisch Gladbach	450.11	2 x 423
S12	(Horrem –) Cologne – Troisdorf – Siegburg – Hennef (Sieg) – Eitorf – Au	450.12	2× 420; 2× 423
S19	Düren – Horrem – Cologne – Cologne Ehrenfeld – Cologne – Cologne/Bonn Airport station – Troisdorf – Hennef – Au	450.13	2× 423; 1x 420 (one set)
S23	Bonn – Meckenheim – Euskirchen – Bad Münstereifel	450.23	620, in the summer, partly 620 + 622 occasionally 2 x 620
S28	Mettmann Stadtwald – Dusseldorf – Neuss – Kaarster See	450.28	1 x Integral
S68	Wuppertal-Vohwinkel – Dusseldorf – Dusseldorf Benrath – Langenfeld (Rhineland) ^{[3]}	450.68	1–2× 420; 143 + 4 x-Wagen

S2^{[1]} One train per hour to Recklinghausen and Essen.
S6^{[2]} Extended to Köln-Worringen during the peak.
S68^{[3]} Only during peak times, Wuppertal-Vohwinkel–Düsseldorf in direction of load.

=== Hanover S-Bahn in North Rhine-Westphalia ===
The Hanover S-Bahn is operated by Transdev Hannover. This list only includes lines that travel in North Rhine-Westphalia.

Line	Route	KBS	Rolling stock
S 1	Minden (Westf) – Haste – Wunstorf – Hannover – Weetzen – Barsinghausen – Haste	363.1	2 x 424
S 5	Paderborn – Altenbeken – Steinheim (Westfalen) – Bad Pyrmont – Hamelin – Weetzen – Hannover – Langenhagen – Hannover Flughafen	363.5	1 x 425, starting Hameln 1 x 425 + 1 x 424

=== Liege S-Bahn in North Rhine-Westphalia ===
Line	Route	KBS	Operator	Rolling stock
S 41	Aachen – Welkenraedt – Verviers – Liege Guillemins – Liege Saint Lambert	480a / L 37	NMBS/SNCB	i10/i11 Coaches or MS80

== Stadtbahn Lines on the tracks of the HGK ==
Select Stadtbahn Lines of the Cologne Stadtbahn and the Bonn Stadtbahn use sections of the rail lines of the Häfen und Güterverkehr Köln railway. Within the cities of Cologne and Bonn these Lines are integrated in the Stadtbahn Rhein-Sieg.

- Lines sections with a frequency of more than 10 minutes, usually in 5-minute intervals, are written in **bold**.
- Lines sections with a frequency of less than 10 minutes, usually in 20-minute intervals, are written in italics.
- Sections that operate as a tram, are written smaller.

Line	Route	KBS	Operator	Rolling stock
7 (KVB line)	Köln-Zündorf – Köln Neumarkt – Aachener Str./Gürtel – Köln Stüttgenhof – Frechen – Frechen-Benzelrath	-	KVB	2 K4000
16 (KVB line)	Köln-Niehl – Köln Dom/Hbf – Köln Heinrich-Lübke-Ufer – Köln-Sürth – Wesseling – Bornheim-Hersel – Bonn-Tannenbusch – Bonn Hbf – Bonn-Bad Godesberg	473.1	KVB und SWB (3 Kurse)	2 B-Wagen (KVB); 2 K5000 (SWB)
18 (KVB line)	Köln-Thielenbruch – **Köln-Buchheim – Köln Dom/Hbf – Köln-Klettenbergpark** – Hürth-Efferen – Brühl Mitte – Bornheim – Alfter – Bonn-Dransdorf – Bonn Hbf	473.2	KVB und SWB (3 Kurse)	2 B-Wagen
Bonn Stadtbahn	Bornheim – Alfter – Bonn-Dransdorf – Bonn Hbf – Bonn-Ramersdorf	473.2	SWB	2 B-Wagen

== See also ==
- List of scheduled railway routes in Germany
- List of German transport associations
