= Löhne–Rheine railway =

Railway line in Germany

Löhne–Rheine
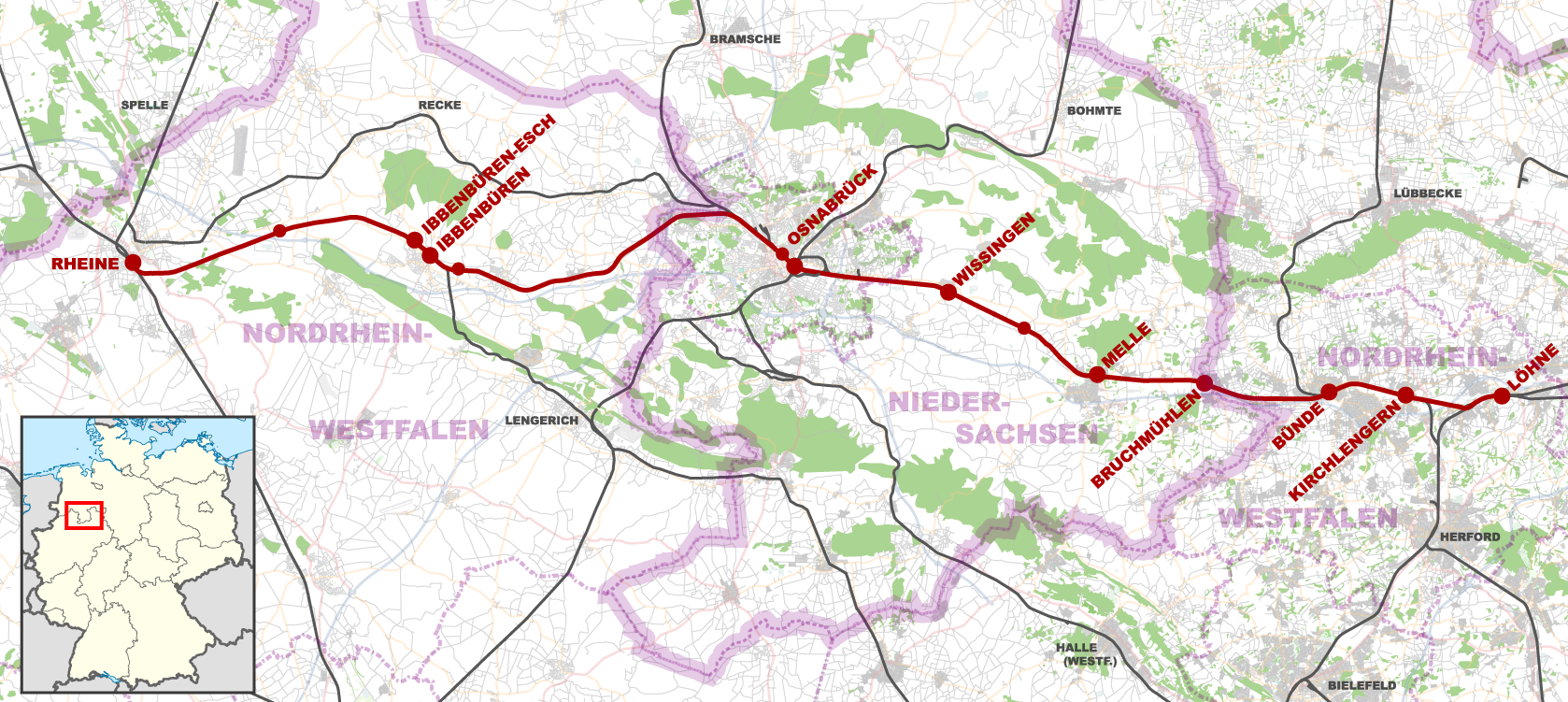

Overview
- Line number: 2992
- Locale: North Rhine-Westphalia and Lower Saxony

Service
- Route number: 375

Technical
- Line length: 124 km (77 mi)
- Track gauge: 1,435 mm (4 ft 8 1/2 in) standard gauge
- Electrification: 15 kV/16.7 Hz AC overhead catenary
- Operating speed: 140 km/h (87 mph) (max)

The Löhne–Rheine railway is a two-track, continuously electrified railway main line from Löhne in the German state of North Rhine-Westphalia via Osnabrück in Lower Saxony to Rheine in North Rhine-Westphalia. It runs parallel to the Wiehen Hills to the north and to the Teutoburg Forest to the south. The line opened in 1855 and 1856 and was one of the oldest railways in Germany.

== History ==
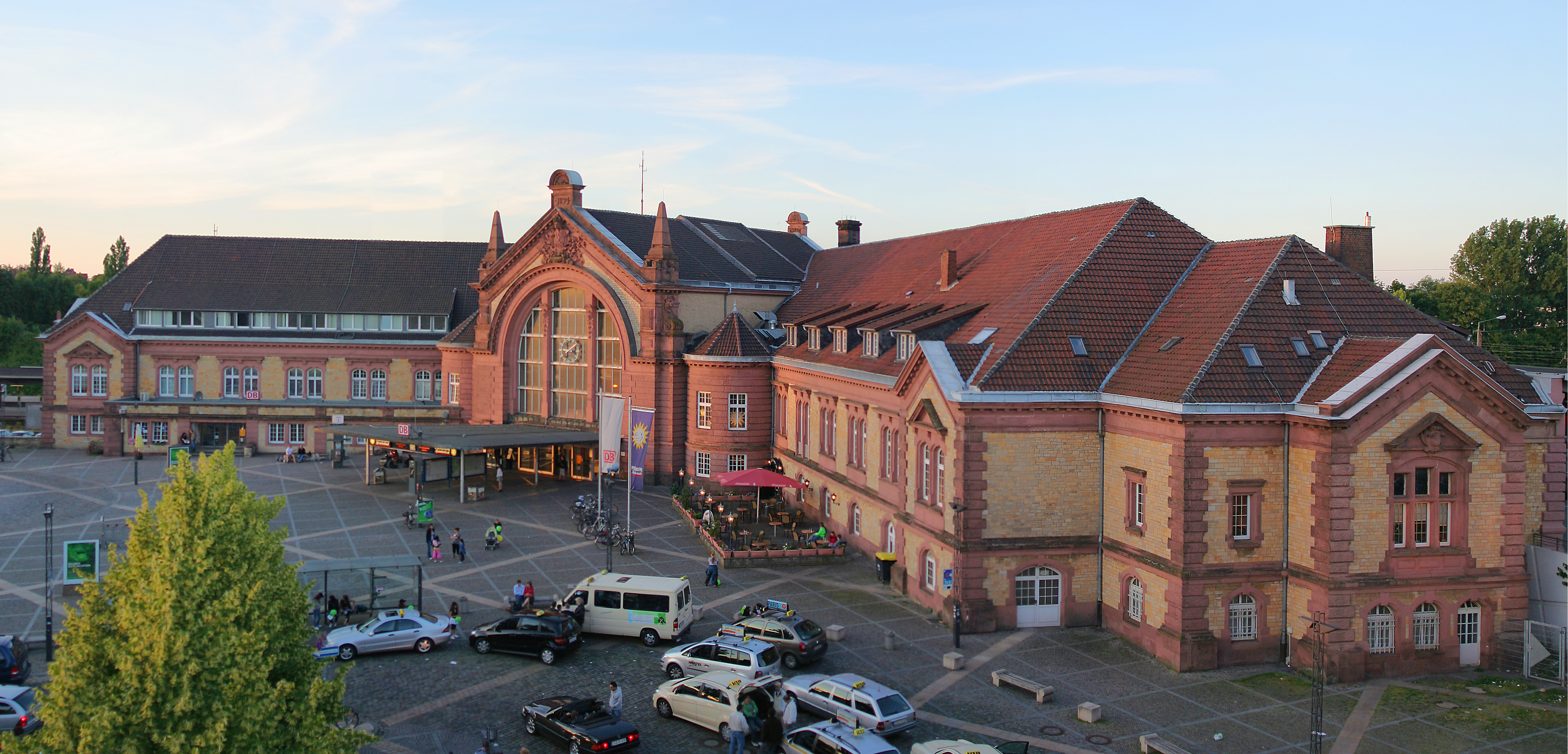
Entrance hall of Osnabrück Hauptbahnhof

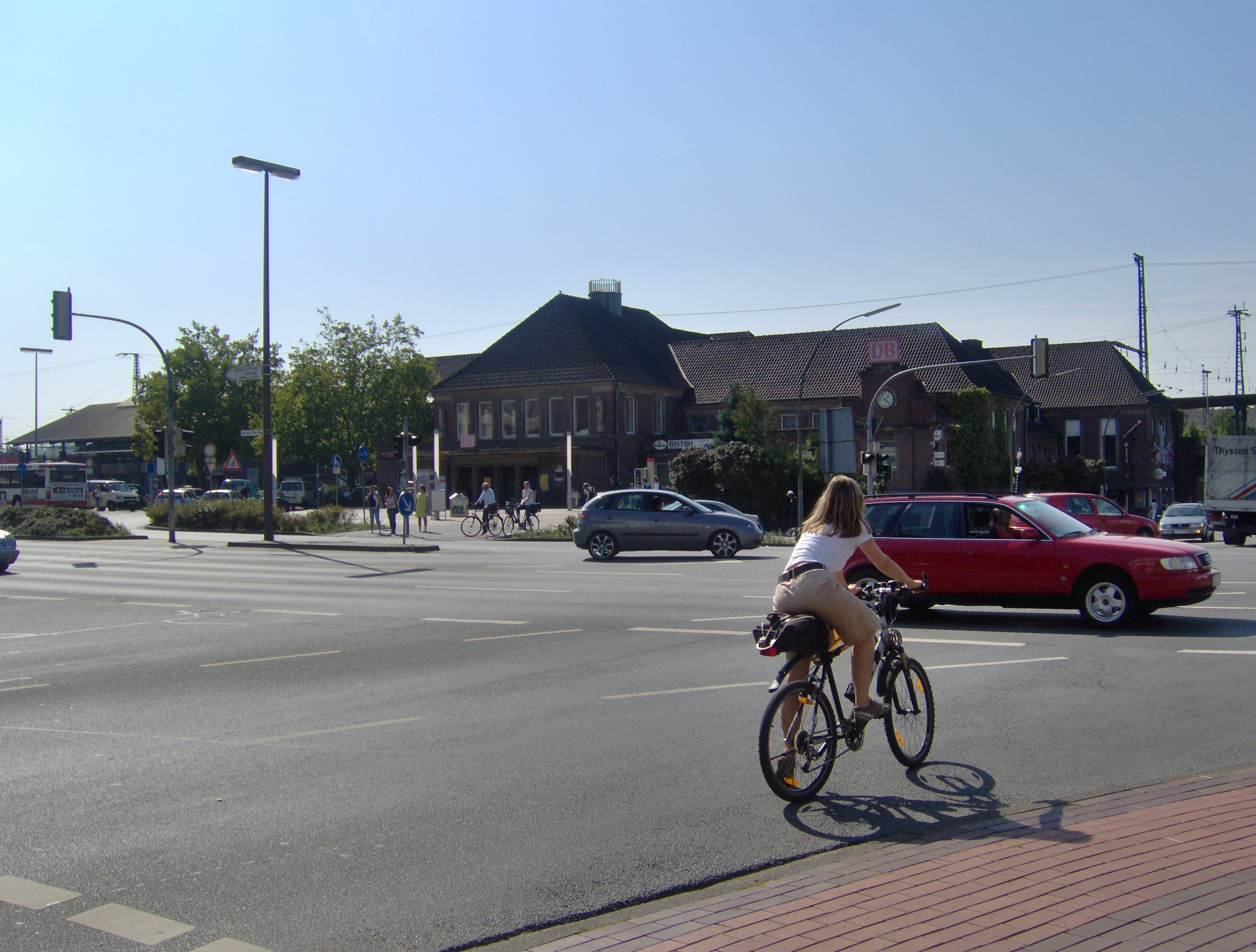
Entrance hall of Rheine station

The Löhne–Rheine line is part of the Hanoverian Western Railway, which was built by the Royal Hanoverian State Railways in the 1850s to develop the western parts of the former Kingdom of Hanover. The first section of this line, part of the Emsland Railway, was opened on 24 November 1854, between Emden and Papenburg, but it had no connection with the existing rail network.

To avoid repeated crossing of the Wiehen Hills, rather than build its own line from the Hanover–Minden line in Minden, the southern section of the Western Railway branched off from the Hamm–Minden line of the Cologne-Minden Railway Company (Köln-Mindener Eisenbahn-Gesellschaft) in Löhne.

On 21 November 1855 passenger operations started on the section between Löhne and Osnabrück. The former Hannöversche Bahnhof ("Hanoverian station") is now the lower part of the Osnabrück Hauptbahnhof, the upper part of which was built only fifteen years later during the construction of the Cologne-Minden Railway's Hamburg-Venlo railway (Hamburg-Venloer Bahn), which is now mostly incorporated in the Wanne-Eickel–Hamburg railway.

Just six months later the next section was put into operation, closing the gap from Osnabrück to Papenburg via Rheine and Salzbergen. On 23 June 1856 passenger trains ran for the first time between Minden and Emden.

=== Connecting lines ===
The importance of the line and its stations increased with the opening of a number of connecting lines, particularly to Rheine station; which connected with the line to Munster of the Royal Westphalian Railway Company (Königlich-Westfälischen Eisenbahn-Gesellschaft), opened in 1856, the Duisburg–Quakenbrück line of the Rhenish Railway Company (Rheinischen Eisenbahn-Gesellschaft), opened in 1879, and the former line to Ochtrup of the Prussian State Railways (Preußischen Staatseisenbahnen), opened in 1905.

Two lines connected at Eversburg station, the Tecklenburg Northern Railway to Altenrheine and the Oldenburg Southern Railway to Oldenburg Hbf.

In addition, there are other links, such as that of the Teutoburg Forest Railway to Gütersloh, connecting in Ibbenbüren station, and the Ravensberg Railway to Rahden, connecting at Bünde station, or in Kirchlengern to Herford station on the Hamm–Minden line.

=== Development of the line ===
The line was gradually duplicated between 1902 and 1916. On 29 September 1974, the first section of overhead wiring was erected between Osnabrück and Rheine and on 30 May 1976 this was followed by the electrification of the section between Osnabrück and Löhne.

== Rail services ==
A two-hour InterCity service operates on the line from Berlin (some to/from Szczecin) via Hanover, Minden and Rheine to Amsterdam Schiphol Airport, and there are individual services from Osnabrück to Münster.

In addition, there are several regional transport services:

- on the whole line, Regional-Express services are operated by DB Regio Niedersachsen every two hours on route RE 60 (Ems-Leine-Express) between Rheine and Brunswick,
- on almost the whole line, Regionalbahn services are operated hourly by Westfalenbahn from Rheine to Kirchlengern on route RB 61 (Wiehengebirgs-Bahn), continuing to Bielefeld
- on the section of Bünde–Kirchlengern, the hourly Ravensberger Bahn service is operated by EuroBahn (Keolis) on the Ravensberg Railway from Bielefeld Hbf via Bünde to Rahden,
- and on the short stretch between the Bünde and Löhne, a generally hourly Regionalbahn service is operated from Monday to Friday by EuroBahn on route RB 77 (Weser-Bahn), continuing to Hildesheim.
