= Oelde station =

Railway station in Germany

Oelde
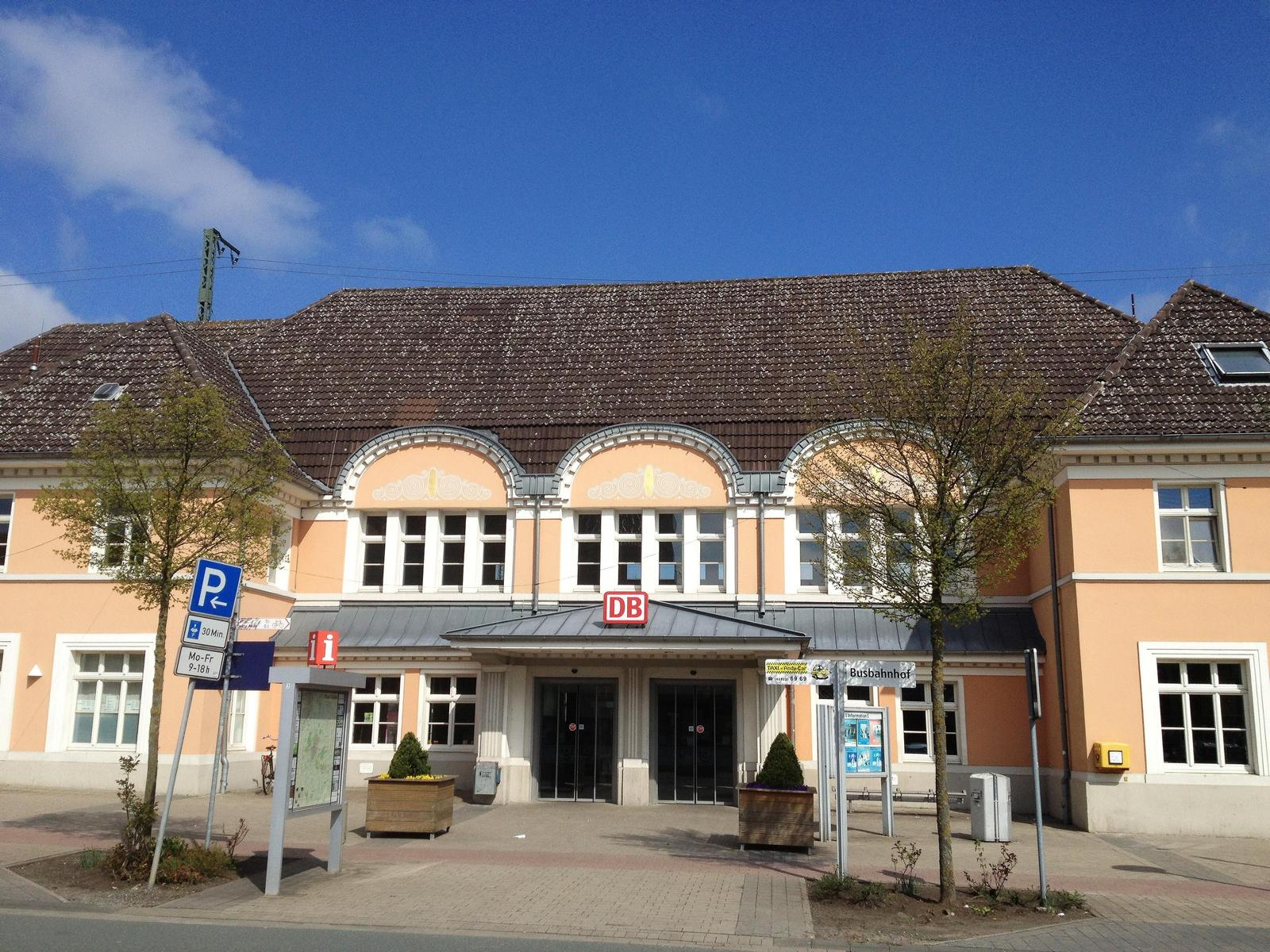

General information
- Location: Am Bahnhof 2, Oelde, NRW; Germany
- Coordinates: 51°49′44″N 8°08′36″E
- Line: Hamm–Minden
- Platforms: 3

Construction
- Accessible: Yes

Other information
- Station code: 4731
- DS100 code: EOEL
- IBNR: 8004626
- Category: 4
- Fare zone: Westfalentarif: 53351
- Website: www.bahnhof.de

History
- Opened: 15 October 1847

Services
Preceding station	National Express Germany	Following station
Neubeckum towards Cologne/Bonn Airport	RE 6 (Rhein-Weser-Express)	Rheda-Wiedenbrück towards Minden
Preceding station		Following station
Neubeckum towards Münster Hbf	RB 69	Rheda-Wiedenbrück towards Bielefeld Hbf
Location

Oelde station is a passenger station in the Westphalian town of Oelde in the German state of North Rhine-Westphalia. It lies on the Hamm–Minden railway, one of the most heavily trafficked lines in Germany. The station is served by an hourly Regional-Express service, the Rhein-Weser-Express (RE 6) on the Cologne–Düsseldorf–Dortmund–Bielefeld–Minden route and an hourly Regionalbahn service, the Ems-Börde-Bahn (RB 69) on the Münster–Hamm–Bielefeld route, meaning that trains run approximately every 30 minutes in both directions. Both lines were previously operated by DB Regio NRW. As of December 2008 the RB 69 service has been operated by the Hamm-based eurobahn.

== Services ==
In passenger transport the station is served by several Regional-Express and Regionalbahn services:

Line	Name	Route	Frequency	Operator
RE 6	Rhein-Weser-Express	Minden – Bielefeld – Oelde – Hamm (Westf) – Dortmund – Essen – Duisburg – Düsseldorf – Neuss – Cologne – Cologne/Bonn Airport	60 min	National Express
RB 69	Ems-Börde-Bahn	Bielefeld – Oelde – Hamm – Münster (Westf)	60 min	eurobahn
See also List of regional rail lines in North Rhine-Westphalia
