= Rheda-Wiedenbrück station =

Railway station in Rheda-Wiedenbrück, Germany

Rheda-Wiedenbrück
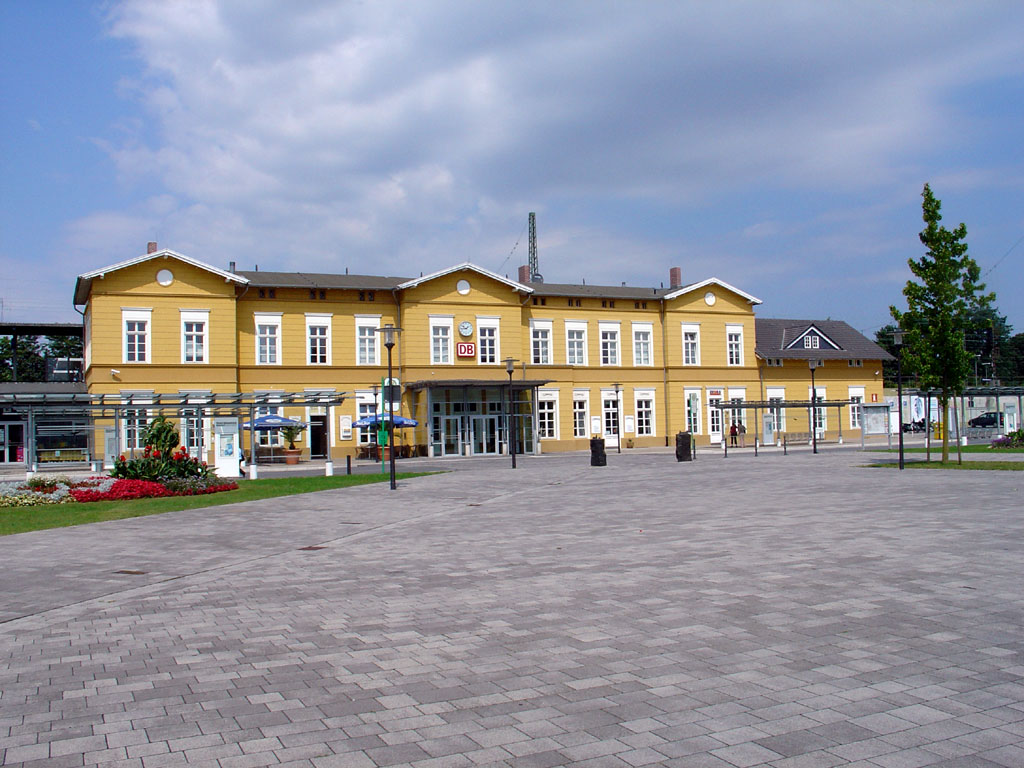
- Main building

General information
- Location: Bahnhofsplatz 18, Rheda-Wiedenbrück, NRW; Germany
- Coordinates: 51°51′26″N 8°17′18″E
- Lines: Hamm–Minden; Warendorf Railway
- Platforms: 6

Construction
- Accessible: Yes

Other information
- Station code: 5247
- DS100 code: ERDW
- IBNR: 8000315
- Category: 4
- Fare zone: Westfalentarif: 61111
- Website: www.bahnhof.de

History
- Opened: 15 October 1847

Services
Preceding station	National Express Germany	Following station
Oelde towards Cologne/Bonn Airport	RE 6 (Rhein-Weser-Express)	Gütersloh Hbf towards Minden
Preceding station		Following station
Herzebrock towards Münster Hbf	RB 67	Gütersloh Hbf towards Bielefeld Hbf
Oelde towards Münster Hbf	RB 69	Gütersloh Hbf towards Bielefeld Hbf
Location

Rheda-Wiedenbrück station is a passenger station in the Westphalian town of Rheda-Wiedenbrück in the German state of North Rhine-Westphalia. It lies on the Hamm–Minden railway, one of the most heavily trafficked lines in Germany. The Warendorf Railway branches off to the west to Münster. The section of the Warendorf Railway running east to Lippstadt is now closed. The station is located north of central Rheda.

== History ==
As part of the construction of its trunk line from Cologne via the Ruhr valley to Minden, the Cologne-Minden Railway Company (German, old spelling: Cöln-Mindener Eisenbahn-Gesellschaft, CME) opened the Hamm–Minden line on 15 October 1847, including the Rheda-Wiedenbrück station, originally called Rheda in Westfalen.

After the nationalisation of the nominally private railway companies, the section from Warendorf via Rheda to Lippstadt of the Warendorf Railway was completed on 25 June 1887, originally crossing the railway station and the existing line at an acute angle. The northern section of the line between Munster and Rheda was controlled by the Royal Railway Division of Cologne Right Bank (Königlichen Eisenbahndirection Cöln rechtsrheinisch), the southern section to Lippstadt, however, was controlled by the Royal Railway Division of Hanover (Königlichen Eisenbahndirection Hannover).

In the following years there were several changes to the competent Railway Division. At the end of the 19th century, the station's name changed to Rheda (Bezirk Minden). Even before the First World War the station was again renamed as Rheda (Westfalen).

In the early 1920s there was an extensive renovation of the station, during which the Warendorf line was changed significantly. The Warendorf line to the west from Munster was diverted around Rheda to run parallel to the railway line from Hamm to run into the station. East of the station the Warendorf line ran parallel to the line to Bielefeld out of the station and returned to the old route between the towns of Rheda and Wiedenbrück. This converted the station into a railway junction.

As part of the North Rhine-Westphalia municipal reform in 1970 the towns of Rheda and Wiedenbrück were merged, but it took a full ten years before Deutsche Bundesbahn changed to the new name. Since 28 September 1980 the station has been called Rheda-Wiedenbrück.

On 1 May 2001, the last part of the southern section of the Warendorf line from Rheda to Lippstadt was closed. Two years later, on 14 December 2003, the freight yard was closed.

== Services ==
In passenger transport the station is served by several Regional-Express and Regionalbahn services:

Line	Name	Route	Frequency	Operator
RE 6	Rhein-Weser-Express	Minden – Bielefeld – Rheda-Wiedenbrück – Hamm (Westf) – Dortmund – Essen – Duisburg – Düsseldorf – Neuss – Cologne – Cologne/Bonn Airport	60 min	National Express
RB 69	Ems-Börde-Bahn	Bielefeld – Rheda-Wiedenbrück – Hamm (Westf) – Münster (Westf)	60 min	eurobahn
RB 67	Der Warendorfer	(Altenbeken – Detmold –) Bielefeld – Rheda-Wiedenbrück – Warendorf – Münster (Westf)	60 min	eurobahn
See also List of regional rail lines in North Rhine-Westphalia
