= Neubeckum station =

Railway station in Germany

Neubeckum

General information
- Location: Bahnhofstr. 16, Neubeckum, NRW; Germany
- Coordinates: 51°48′06″N 8°01′19″E
- Lines: Hamm–Minden; Münster–Warstein railway
- Platforms: 5

Construction
- Accessible: Yes

Other information
- Station code: 4361
- DS100 code: ENBM
- IBNR: 8004251
- Category: 4
- Fare zone: Westfalentarif: 53333
- Website: www.bahnhof.de

History
- Opened: 15 October 1847

Services
Preceding station	National Express Germany	Following station
Ahlen (Westfalen) towards Cologne/Bonn Airport	RE 6 (Rhein-Weser-Express)	Oelde towards Minden
Preceding station		Following station
Ahlen (Westfalen) towards Münster Hbf	RB 69	Oelde towards Bielefeld Hbf
Location

Neubeckum station is a passenger station in the district of Neubeckum, part the Westphalian town of Beckum in the German state of North Rhine-Westphalia. The station was established in 1847. The village of Neubeckum (literally "new Beckum") was established in 1847 at the railway station, six km from Beckum. It lies on the Hamm–Minden railway, one of the most heavily trafficked lines in Germany. It has an hourly Regional-Express service, the Rhein-Weser-Express (RE 6) on the Düsseldorf–Dortmund–Bielefeld–Minden route as well as an hourly Regionalbahn service, the Ems-Börde-Bahn (RB 69) on the Münster)–Hamm–Bielefeld route, so there is a service about every half an hour. Both lines were previously operated by DB Regio NRW. In December 2008, eurobahn, based in Hamm, took over the operation of RB 69.

Neubeckum is still a railway junction. At Neubeckum station the Münster–Warstein railway of the Westfälische Landes-Eisenbahn (Westphalian State Railway) crosses the Hamm–Minden railway. Its purpose is mainly to bring high-purity limestone from the Warstein limestone quarries to the cement plants to the north at Ennigerloh. Neubeckum's former cement plants have closed. Until 1975, the Westfälische Landes-Eisenbahn operated passenger services, including to Münster, Warendorf and Lippstadt. The line is still used for the operation of steam-hauled museum trains from Münster via Neubeckum to Lippstadt, Erwitte, Anröchte and Warstein.

== Services ==
In passenger transport the station is served by several Regional-Express and Regionalbahn services:

Line	Name	Route	Frequency	Operator
RE 6	Rhein-Weser-Express	Minden – Bielefeld – Neubeckum – Hamm (Westf) – Dortmund – Essen – Duisburg – Düsseldorf – Neuss – Cologne – Cologne/Bonn Airport	60 min	National Express
RB 69	Ems-Börde-Bahn	Bielefeld – Neubeckum – Hamm – Münster (Westf)	60 min	eurobahn
See also List of regional rail lines in North Rhine-Westphalia
