= Gütersloh Hauptbahnhof =

Railway station in North Rhine-Westphalia, Germany

Gütersloh Hbf
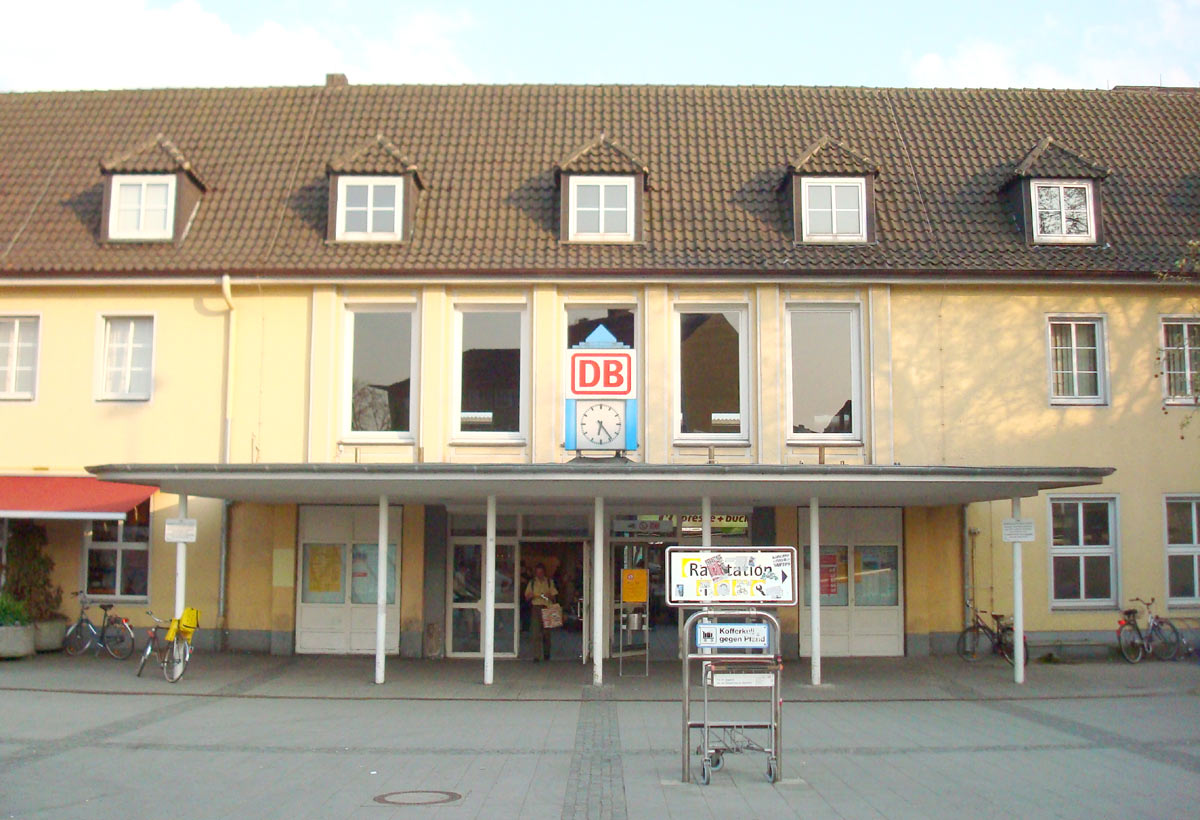
- Entrance to the station hall

General information
- Location: Willy-Brandt-Platz 2, Gütersloh, North Rhine-Westphalia; Germany
- Coordinates: 51°54′25″N 8°23′5″E
- Owner: DB Netz
- Operator: DB Station&Service
- Lines: Hamm–Minden (KBS 400); Bielefeld–Münster line (KBS 406)
- Platforms: 4
- Train operators: DB Fernverkehr; DB Regio NRW; Eurobahn; National Express Germany

Construction
- Accessible: Yes

Other information
- Station code: 2438
- DS100 code: EGLO
- Category: 3
- Fare zone: Westfalentarif: 60511
- Website: www.bahnhof.de

History
- Opened: 1847
Services
Preceding station	DB Fernverkehr	Following station
Hamm (Westf) Hbf towards Köln Hbf	ICE 10	Bielefeld Hbf towards Berlin Ostbahnhof
Hamm (Westf) Hbf towards Aachen Hbf	ICE 14	Bielefeld Hbf towards Berlin Ostbahnhof
Hamm (Westf) Hbf towards Stuttgart Hbf	IC 55	Bielefeld Hbf towards Dresden Hbf
Preceding station	National Express Germany	Following station
Rheda-Wiedenbrück towards Cologne/Bonn Airport	RE 6 (Rhein-Weser-Express)	Bielefeld Hbf towards Minden
Preceding station		Following station
Rheda-Wiedenbrück towards Münster Hbf	RB 67	Isselhorst-Avenwedde towards Bielefeld Hbf
Rheda-Wiedenbrück towards Münster Hbf	RB 69	Isselhorst-Avenwedde towards Bielefeld Hbf
Location
- Location within North Rhine-Westphalia

Gütersloh Hauptbahnhof is the main railway station in Gütersloh in the German state of North Rhine-Westphalia. It is on the electrified, four-track main line from the Ruhr to Hanover, opened in 1847 as part of the trunk line of the former Cologne-Minden Railway Company. Services of the Warendorf Railway also run from Münster via Rheda-Wiedenbrück and the Hamm–Minden line to Gütersloh.

Gütersloh Hauptbahnhof (Hbf) is classified by Deutsche Bahn as a category 4 station. In the station building there is a tourist bureau, where tickets can be purchased. There is also has a restaurant/bistro, a bakery, a mini-supermarket and a station bookshop.

== History ==
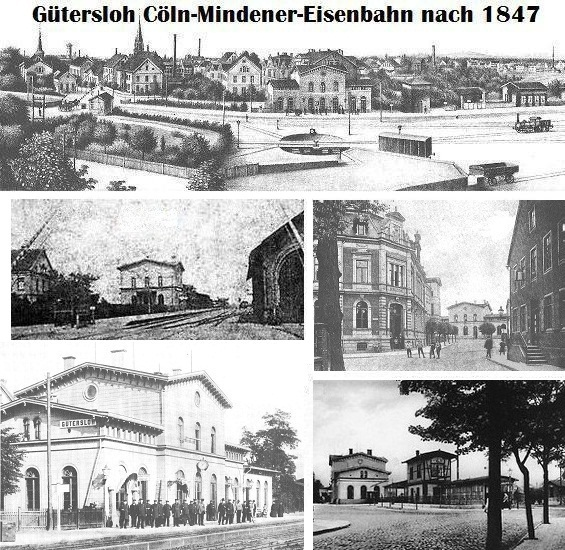
Gütersloh's first station building opened by the Cologne-Minden Railway Company in 1847

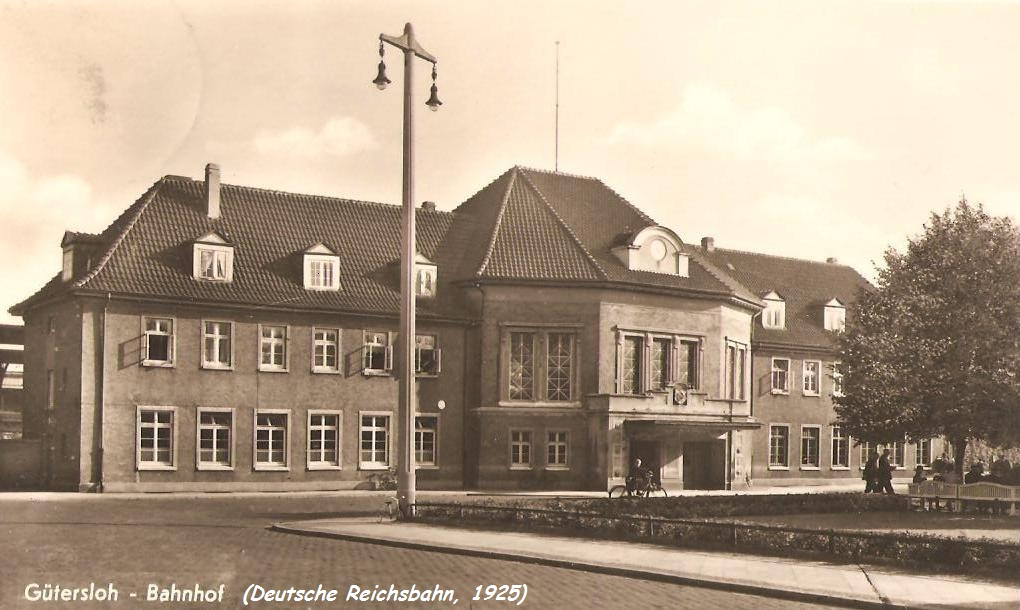
The station building opened in 1925, the "Gütersloh Reichsbahn" station existed in this form for only 20 years: the lobby and the right wings were destroyed in 1945.

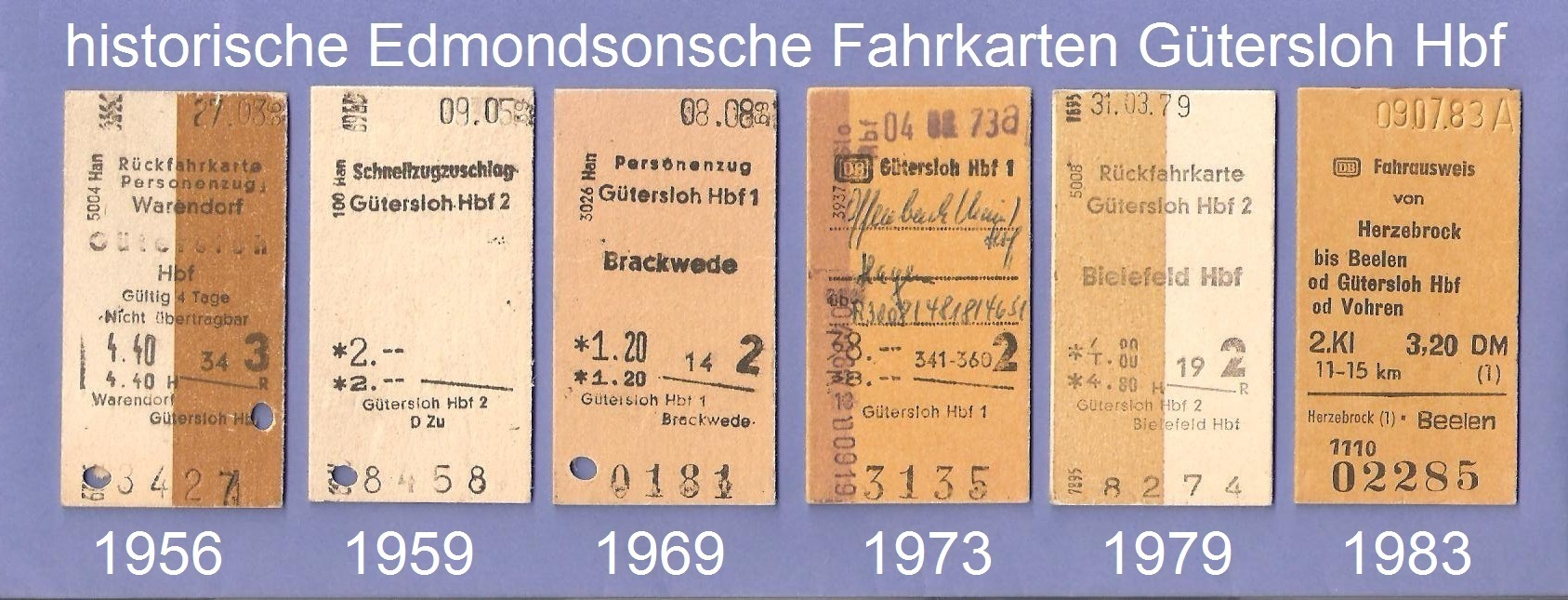
3rd and 2nd class Edmondson tickets issued between 1956 and 1983 at Gütersloh Hbf

Gütersloh‘s original station building was built between 1845 and 1847 by the Cologne-Minden Railway Company at the end of today's Kökerstraße. Two side wings were added in 1876/77 and the Königliche Eisenbahndirektion Hannover (railway division of the Prussian state railways of Hanover) built another extension at the turn of the century. After the neo-classical entrance building was demolished for the quadruplication of the Hamm–Minden line, Deutsche Reichsbahn-Gesellschaft (DRG) opened a new monumental station building at its present location on the street then called Queckwinkel on 21 December 1925. The extensive rebuilding of the extensive rail facilities, which replaced all the level crossings with underpasses, was completed in 1930 with the opening of the new freight yard beyond the freight tracks on Langer Weg. The ticket hall and the south wing (with the ticket office, express freight and baggage handling facilities) were damaged by air raids on 14 March 1945 and blown up by American troops in April 1945. For about six years it was necessary to buy tickets and to despatch baggage a temporarily constructed shed on the station forecourt. Deutsche Bundesbahn (DB) incorporated the north wing, which was still-standing and included a station restaurant and waiting room, in the reconstruction. The new south wing was built on the foundations of the previous building as an extended building and reinaugurated on 3 October 1951. With the completion of the new entrance hall in a simpler form in 1953, today's station had taken form adjoining the eastern end of inner city.

The first test train, hauled by electric locomotive E10 438, ran on 25 September 1968, and official services commenced in Gütersloh Hbf with a special train hauled by 112498-1 on 29 September 1968. Since that day, the section between Hamm and Wunstorf has been electrified and the important link between the Ruhr and Hanover has been open for continuous electrical operations.

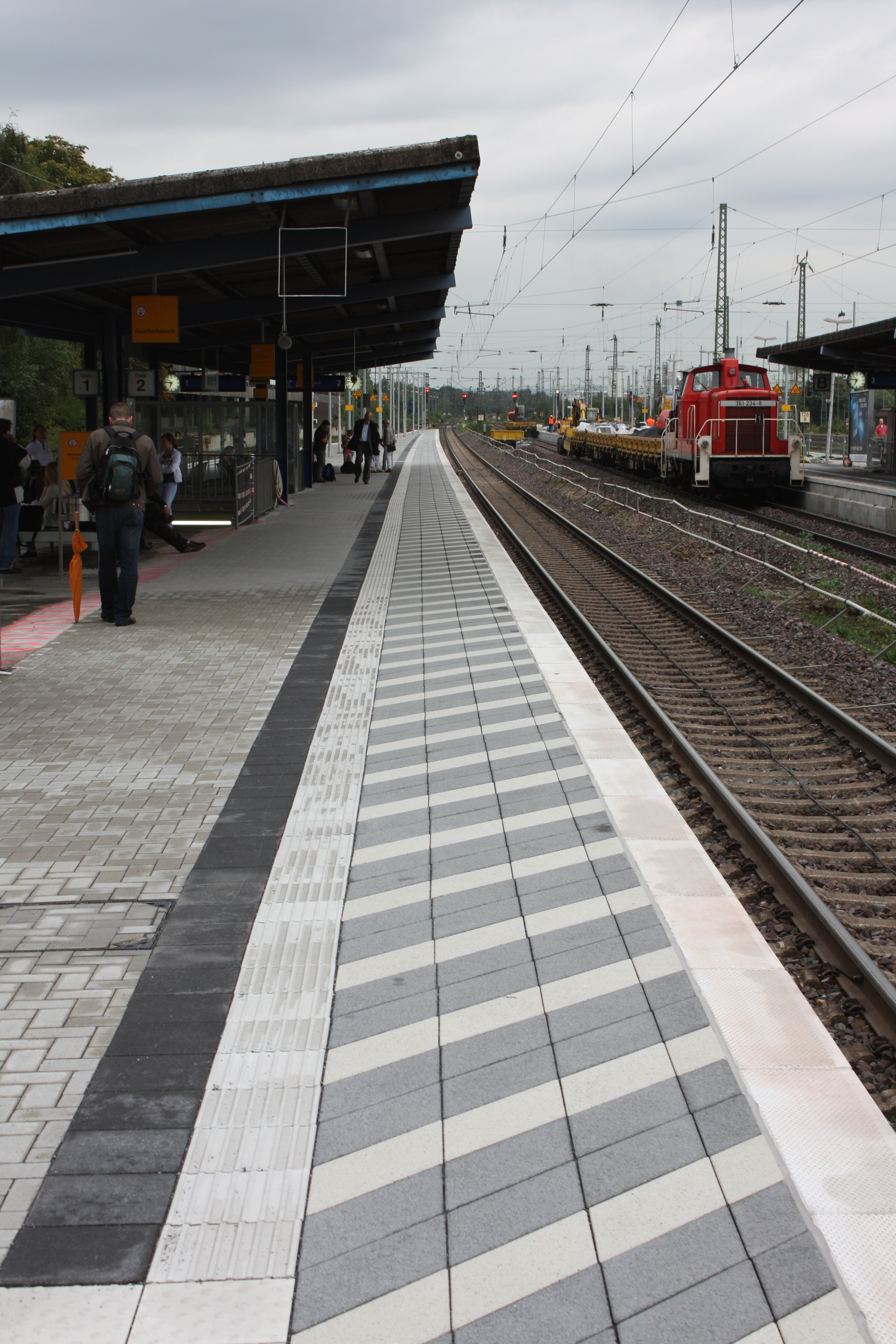
New platform edge on track 2 completed in August 2010: the shaded edge draws attention to the danger of ICE trains passing at 200 km/h.

Since 1973, Gütersloh Hbf has always served as a starting point for testing high-speed train operations by the Bundesbahn Central Offices (BZA) in Minden. In September 1973 an electric locomotive of class 103 reached a speed of 252.9 km/h on a test section between Gütersloh and Neubeckum. The 58.0 km-long section between Brackwede and Hamm became one of the first lines in Germany to be upgraded for scheduled services at 200 km/h in 1979 and, since then, the two platforms on the main tracks 2 and 3 runs are regularly passed at the 200 km/h maximum speed. On 26 November 1985, at 11:29, an InterCityExperimental train fully occupied with passengers on the line between Gutersloh and Hamm reached a speed of 317 km/h. This was a new German record for rail vehicles and a world record for rail vehicles using three-phase power.

The display boards on the platforms had been defective since December 2005 and were repaired by Deutsche Bahn in October 2008. Since February 2010, extensive refurbishment has been carried out at the station. Deutsche Bahn was funded by about €3 million from an economic stimulus package. The work was initially scheduled to be completed by the end of March 2011. All four platform edges of the two island platforms have been raised and adapted for the visually impaired. Comprehensive lighting and new equipment was also installed at the station. In addition, passenger lifts were put into operation on the platforms on 23 December 2011. The temporary lifts that were previously used have now been removed.

The Zweckverband Verkehrsverbund OWL (Ostwestfalen-Lippe transport association) is seeking the resumption of passenger services on the Teutoburg Forest Railway (Teutoburger Wald-Eisenbahn) line to Harsewinkel and Verl in December 2016. If this is realized trains would run via a new rail connection to the TWE and stop on platform 1.

== Rail services ==
In long-distance traffic, the station is served every two hours by an Intercity service on line IC 55 between Stuttgart and Dresden. During early or late hours some Intercity-Express services also stop in Gütersloh. The station was served by the following long-distance services in 2026:

Line	Route	Frequency
ICE 10	Cologne – Düsseldorf – Düsseldorf Airport – Duisburg – Essen – Dortmund – Hamm – Gütersloh – Bielefeld – Hanover – Berlin Hbf – Berlin Ostbahnhof	1-2 train pairs daily
ICE 14	Berlin East – Berlin Hbf – Wolfsburg – Hannover – Minden – Herford – Bielefeld – Gütersloh – Hamm – Dortmund – Essen – Duisburg – Krefeld – Mönchengladbach – Aachen	4 train pairs daily
IC 55; ICE 55	Dresden – Leipzig – Magdeburg – Braunschweig – Hanover – Minden – Bad Oeynhausen – Herford – Bielefeld – Gütersloh – Hamm – Wuppertal – Cologne – Bonn – Koblenz – Mainz – Mannheim – Heidelberg – Stuttgart	Every 2 hours

There is a regional service at 30-minute intervals between Gütersloh and Hamm. There have been three services per hour to Bielefeld since December 2006. The station was served by the following regional services in 2026:

Line	Name	Route	Operator
RE 6	Rhein-Weser-Express	Minden (Westf) – Bielefeld – Gütersloh – Hamm (Westf) – Dortmund – Bochum – Essen – Duisburg – Düsseldorf – Neuss – Cologne – Cologne/Bonn Airport	National Express
RB 67	Der Warendorfer	Bielefeld – Gütersloh – Warendorf – Münster (Westf)	Eurobahn
RB 69	Ems-Börde-Bahn	Bielefeld – Gütersloh – Hamm (Westf) – Münster (Westf)	Eurobahn

=== Fares ===
The station is covered by Der Sechser (“the six”) fares of the Zweckverband Verkehrsverbund OWL (Ostwestfalen-Lippe transport association). In addition, transitional fares of the Münsterland-Tarif (Verkehrsgemeinschaft Münsterland, Munsterland Transport Community) apply to Warendorf or Ahlen and the whole area is covered by the state-wide NRW-tariff fares.

== Station connections ==
Directly opposite the entrance to the station is a central bus station. From here, the Gütersloh urban area is served by the star-shaped city bus network of Stadtwerke Gütersloh. There are also regional bus services to neighbouring towns.

At walking distance beyond the main post office and Friedrich-Ebert-Straße is the Gütersloh Nord station of the Teutoburg Forest Railway (Teutoburger Wald-Eisenbahn, TWE), which formerly ran passenger services towards Hövelhof and Ibbenbüren. This terminus is still used occasionally for museum services operating as the Teuto-Express.
