= RE6 (disambiguation) =

RE6 or RE 6 could refer to:

- Resident Evil 6, a video game
- the Rhein-Weser-Express (RE 6), a rail service in Germany
- the RE6, a rail service in the cantons of Aargau and Schwyz, Switzerland
- the RE6, a rail service in the canton of Neuchâtel, Switzerland
