= Lemgo-Lüttfeld station =

Railway station in Germany

Coordinates: 52°01′15″N 8°54′38″E

Lemgo-Lüttfeld
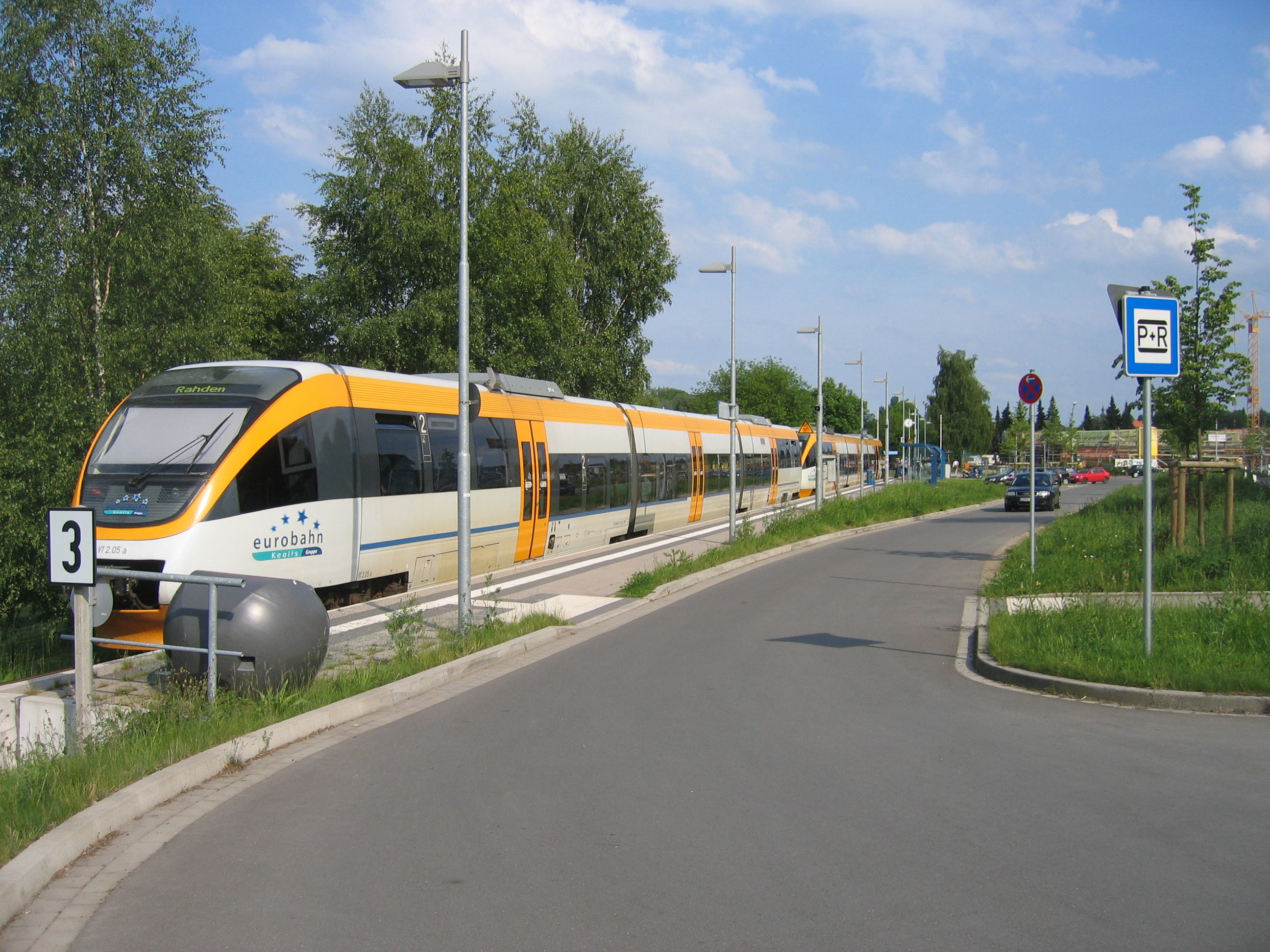
- Lemgo-Lüttfeld railway station

General information
- Location: Lemgo, North Rhine-Westphalia; Germany
- Line: Bielefeld-Hameln railway

Other information
- Station code: ?
- DS100 code: ELGL
- Category: 5
- Fare zone: Westfalentarif: 66011

Services
Preceding station		Following station
Lemgo towards Bielefeld Hbf	RB 73	Terminus
Location

Lemgo-Lüttfeld is a railway station located in Lemgo, Germany. The station was opened on 28 July 2007 is located on the Bielefeld-Hameln railway. The train services are operated by Eurobahn.

== Train services ==
In 2013, the following services called at Lemgo-Lüttfeld:

- RB73 Der Lipperländer Rahden - Bünde - Herford - Bielefeld - Lage - Lemgo
