= Hellweg Net =

Rail network in North Rhine-Westphalia

The Hellweg net consists of the four Regionalbahn lines in the German state of North Rhine-Westphalia: RB 50 (Münster – Lünen – Dortmund), RB 59 (Dortmund – Unna – Soest), RB 69 (Münster – Hamm – Bielefeld) and RB 89 (Münster – Hamm – Paderborn – Warburg). It has a length of about 370 km. The RB 50 is referred to as Der Lüner, the RB 59 as Die Hellweg-Bahn and the RB 69 and RB 89 together as Die Ems-Börde-Bahn. On 14 December 2008 operations were taken over by eurobahn (own capitalisation). Previously these four Regionalbahn services were operated by DB Regio NRW.

== Tender ==
The Hellweg network was announced in March 2006. This was one of the largest rail networks to be put to tender in Germany. Tenders were submitted by Abellio Rail NRW, DB Regio NRW, Arriva Deutschland (now Netinera), Rhenus Keolis and the Hamburger Hochbahn together with moBiel (the Bielefeld municipal transport company). The winner of the tender was the then Rhenus Keolis GmbH & Co. KG, a joint venture, which on 1 January 2007 was divided between the two partners. It was put into operation by Keolis Deutschland GmbH & Co. KG under the brand name of eurobahn.

== General ==
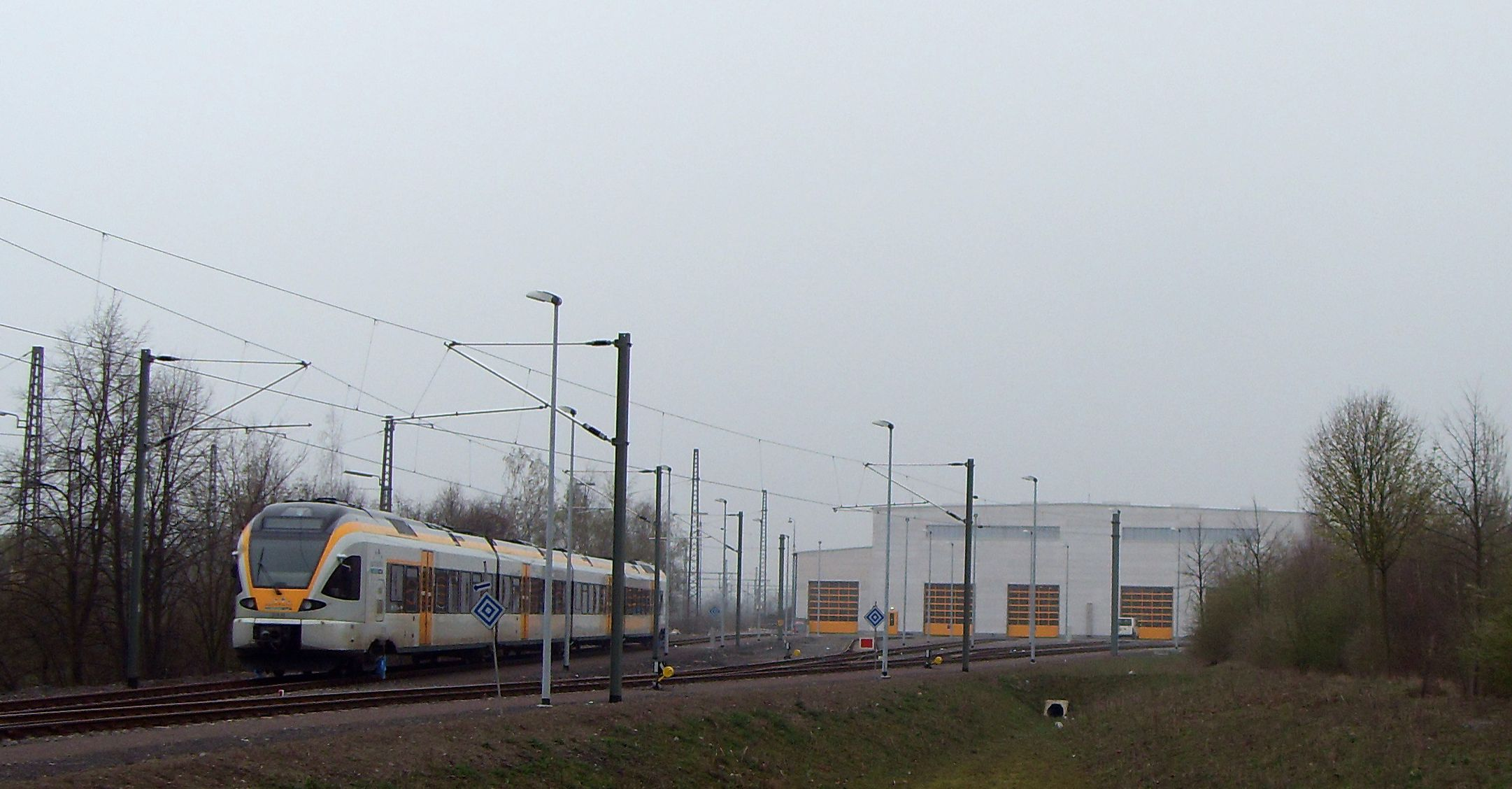
Workshop in Hamm-Heesen and Stadler Flirt of the Eurobahn

The contract for the operation of the Hellweg network was closed on 14 July 2008. It covers a volume of 5.6 million train-km per year and is valid for ten years. The contractors are Nahverkehrsverbund Paderborn-Höxter (Paderborn-Höxter local transport, nph), Verkehrsverbund Rhein-Ruhr (Rhine-Ruhr transport association, VRR), VerkehrsVerbund OstWestfalenLippe (Ostwestfalen-Lippe transport association, VVOWL), Zweckverband Ruhr-Lippe (Ruhr-Lippe purpose association, ZRL) and Zweckverband SPNV Münsterland (Münsterland public transport association, ZVM) as public transport authorities and Eurobahn as operator.

The existing timetable was maintained. The Eurobahn bought 25 new four-part Stadler FLIRT railcars for operation on the Hellweg network. These replaced older Deutsche Bahn vehicles. The increased comfort of the new train sets as well as the fully functioning ticket machine in the train were well received by passengers.

A workshop was built in Hamm-Heessen for servicing Eurobahn's Flirt railcars with a capacity of 43 vehicles. It was taken into full operation in the summer of 2009. The company plans to employ 200 people there.

== RB 50: Der Lüner ==
RB 50: Der Lüner

Overview
- Locale: North Rhine-Westphalia, Germany

Service
- Route number: 411
- Operator: Eurobahn

Technical
- Operating speed: 160 km/h (99.4 mph) (maximum)

Der Lüner (meaning the person/thing from Lünen) connects Dortmund via Lünen with Munster.

Services run from Dortmund Hauptbahnhof via Münster Hauptbahnhof initially over a section of the Dortmund–Gronau railway. From Lünen they run on the Preußen–Münster railway.

=== Development ===
The RB 50 had a difficult start. Because the workshop in Hamm-Heessen had not yet been completed, the maintenance of all new railcars was carried out in the WestfalenBahn workshop in Rheine. Hence, bottlenecks often occurred that initially forced to use of one-part train sets. In the winter of 2008/2009 the entire Hellweg network was affected, but RB 50 was most frequently operated with one-part trains, which reduced the space available for passengers and caused crowded trains.

The state of a platform in Preußen station, which serves the districts of Lünen-Horstmar and Lünen-South, prompted the Federal Railway Authority in early May 2009 to ban the trains stopping at a curved part of the platform there. As a first response, Eurobahn again ran one-part trains that did not have to stop on the curved part of the platform. In mid-May the originally planned two-part trains ran again, but with trains running from Dortmund to Preußen not stopping, which also solved the problem. Preußen station was only served by trains from Dortmund by the parallel service, the RB 51 (Westmünsterland-Bahn). Eurobahn put additional assisting staff in Preußen station at the beginning of 20 May 2009, so that the operation of the full timetable was possible. Eurobahn called on DB Station&Service as the owner of the railway facilities to remedy the situation. The platform was rebuilt in September 2009.

=== Service ===
The RB 50 runs every hour seven days a week. The service is reinforced between Lünen and Dortmund by the RB 51, which continues from Lünen via Gronau to Enschede.

== RB 59: Hellweg-Bahn ==
RB 59: Hellweg-Bahn

Overview
- Locale: North Rhine-Westphalia, Germany

Service
- Route number: 431
- Operator: Eurobahn

Technical
- Operating speed: 160 km/h (99.4 mph) (maximum)

The Hellweg-Bahn follows the Dortmund–Soest railway. Its name refers to the Westphalian Hellweg, a medieval road that followed a similar route.

=== Development ===
Eurobahn took over from three-part push–pull trains operated by DB Regio NRW. Its trains consisted of modernised, red Silberling carriages hauled by class 110 locomotives, veteran rollingstock from the days of Deutsche Bundesbahn. At the end of 2007 these trains were so often affected by dirt and technical defects that the Zweckverband Ruhr-Lippe sought an early takeover of the operation by Eurobahn in November 2007. However, this could not be realized.

=== Service ===
The service runs every half hour during the week and every hour on the weekend. In Soest, there is a guaranteed connection to the RB 69/RB 89 towards Paderborn.

== RB 69/89: Ems-Börde-Bahn ==
RB 69, RB 89: Ems-Börde-Bahn

Overview
- Locale: North Rhine-Westphalia, Germany

Service
- Route number: 400, 410, 430
- Operator: Eurobahn

Technical
- Operating speed: 160 km/h (99.4 mph) (maximum)

The Ems-Börde-Bahn consists of the two services, the RB 69 and the RB 89, connecting Bielefeld and Paderborn hourly with Hamm and Munster. Its name refers to the Ems river and the Hellweg Börde (a fertile plain). Services start in Munster and run over the Münster–Hamm railway to Hamm. From there the RB 69 runs over the Hamm–Minden railway to Bielefeld and the RB 89 runs over the Hamm–Warburg railway to Warburg.

=== Development ===
The predecessors of the services were the DB Regio NRW-operated Westfalenbahn from Bielefeld/Paderborn via Hamm and Münster to Rheine. Because of the similarity of the name with the WestfalenBahn GmbH company, which was established in 2005, it was renamed the Ems-Börde-Bahn, referring to the Ems river and the county of Börde.

=== Service ===
The RB 89 service runs between Münster and Paderborn every half hour from Monday to Friday and every hour on weekends. The RB 69 runs between Münster and Bielefeld hourly each day, this service route connects with the RB 89 in Hamm, where trains on the two routes are coupled (or uncoupled if running in the opposite direction).

The section of the train running as RB 89 continues from Hamm via Soest and Lippstadt to Paderborn, continuing every two hours to Warburg. Individual services in the morning and evening hours since December 2010 have operated to/from Kassel-Wilhelmshöhe. Especially on weekends there are additional services to/from Warburg, providing an hourly service during parts of the day on this section. Some trains running to/from Warburg do not stop on weekends at the stations of Borgeln, Dedinghausen, Ehringhausen and Scharmede. In Hamm there are also connections with Intercity-Express (ICE), Intercity (IC) and Regional-Express (RE) services on line RE 1 (NRW-Express, Aachen–Düsseldorf–Hamm). In Warburg it connects with the RE 17 (Sauerland-Express) to Kassel-Wilhelmshöhe. Once a day, in both directions, the RB 89 runs directly to Kassel-Wilhelmshöhe.

The section of the train running as RB 69 continues from Hamm via Ahlen and Gutersloh to Bielefeld. This service together with the Rhein-Weser-Express (RE 6, Düsseldorf–Minden) produce a service every half hour. This service is complemented by the RB 67 (Der Warendorfer) service, which also runs between Münster and Bielefeld (operated until December 2013 by NordWestBahn, but now operated by Eurobahn), but uses the Warendorf Railway. Although the Warendorf line between Rheda-Wiedenbrück and Münster is shorter, Ems-Börde-Bahn services running via Hamm are about 10 minutes faster because of their higher average speed. The Ems-Börde-Bahn and Warendorfer operate to the same endpoints in both Rheda-Wiedenbrück and Gütersloh. There are also ICE and IC services between Hamm and Bielefeld.

== Fares ==
The following regional fares apply to the Hellweg network: Verkehrsverbund Rhein-Ruhr (Rhine-Ruhr transport association, based in Dortmund), Verkehrsgemeinschaft Münsterland (transport community of Münsterland, based in Münster; the fare is called the Münsterlandtarif), Verkehrsgemeinschaft Ruhr-Lippe (transport community of Ruhr-Lippe, based in Hamm and Soest; the fare is called the Ruhr-Lippe-Tarif), Nahverkehrsverbund Paderborn-Höxter (local transport association of Paderborn-Höxter; the fare is called the Hochstifttarif, referring to the Hochstift of Paderborn), and Verkehrsverbund OstWestfalenLippe (transport association of OstWestfalenLippe, based in Bielefeld; the fare is called Der Sechser, meaning “the six”, referring to cooperation zone (Kooperationsraum) 6 of the state) and the statewide NRW-tariff (fare).

== See also ==
- List of regional railway lines in North Rhine-Westphalia
