= Bielefeld Hauptbahnhof =

Railway station in North Rhine-Westphalia, Germany

Bielefeld Hbf
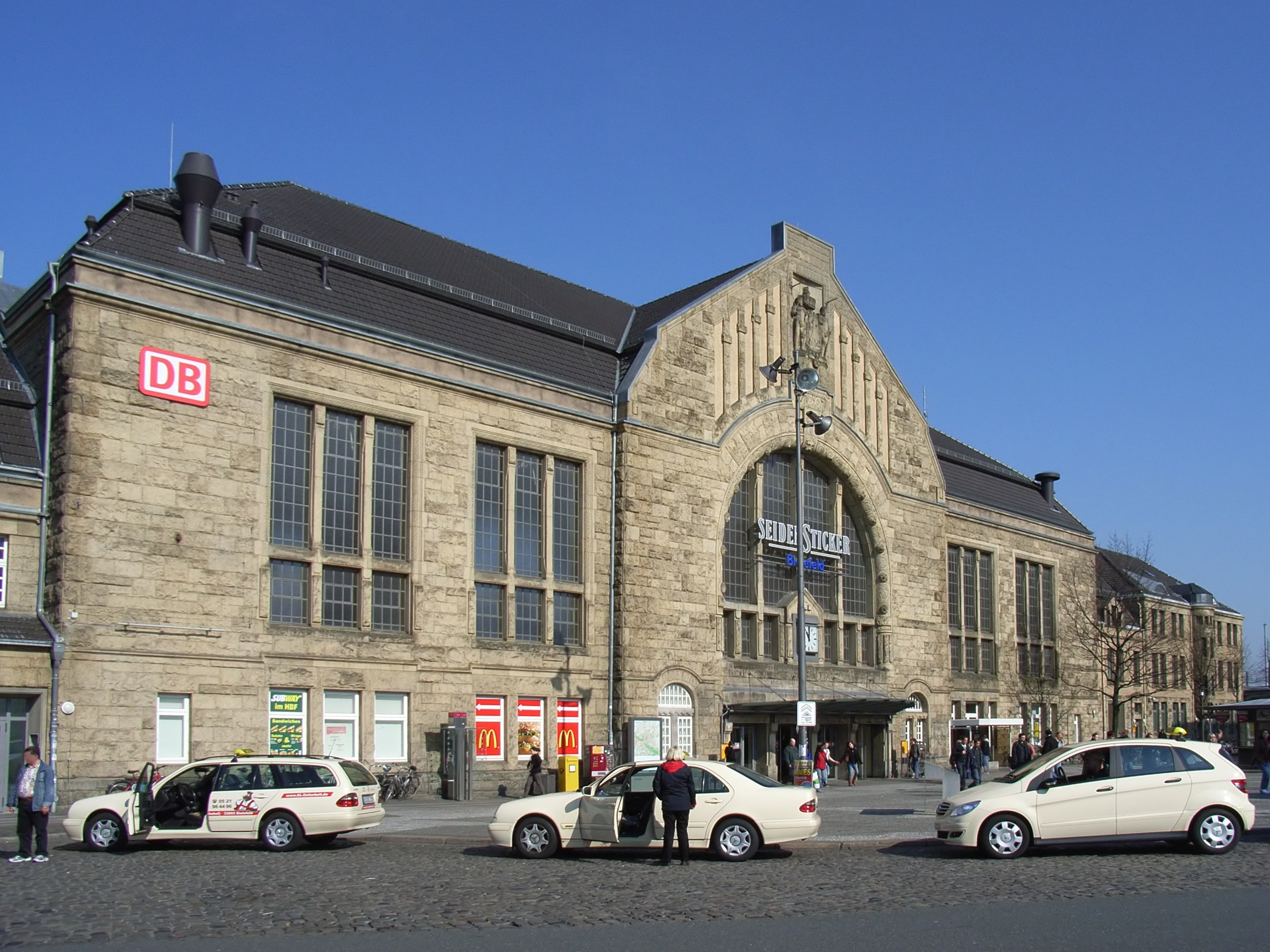
- Station building and forecourt in April 2008

General information
- Location: Am Bahnhof 1b, Bielefeld, NRW; Germany
- Coordinates: 52°01′42″N 8°31′54″E
- Lines: Hamm–Minden (KBS 400); Bielefeld–Rahden (KBS 386); Osnabrück–Bielefeld (KBS 402); Bielefeld–Paderborn (KBS 403); Bielefeld–Hamelin (KBS 404)
- Platforms: 8

Construction
- Accessible: Yes
- Architectural style: Art Nouveau

Other information
- Station code: 622
- DS100 code: EBIL
- Category: 2
- Fare zone: Westfalentarif: 60011; VOS: Der Sechser (Westfalentarif transitional tariff)
- Website: www.bahnhof.de

History
- Opened: 1847

Passengers
- 50,000 daily
Services
Preceding station	DB Fernverkehr	Following station
Gütersloh Hbf towards Köln Hbf	ICE 10	Herford towards Berlin Ostbahnhof
Gütersloh Hbf towards Aachen Hbf	ICE 14	Herford towards Berlin Ostbahnhof
Hamm (Westf) Hbf One-way operation	ICE 19	Hannover Hbf towards Berlin Ostbahnhof
Gütersloh Hbf towards Stuttgart Hbf or Tübingen Hbf	IC 55	Herford towards Dresden Hbf
Preceding station		Following station
Dortmund Hbf towards Aachen Hbf	FLX 30	Hannover Hbf towards Leipzig Hbf
Preceding station	National Express Germany	Following station
Gütersloh Hbf towards Cologne/Bonn Airport	RE 6 (Rhein-Weser-Express)	Herford towards Minden
Preceding station		Following station
Terminus	RE 78	Herford towards Nienburg (Weser)
Terminus	RE 82	Oerlinghausen towards Altenbeken
Brake bei Bielefeld towards Hengelo	RB 61	Terminus
Brackwede towards Münster Hbf	RB 67	Terminus
Brackwede towards Münster Hbf	RB 69	Terminus
Terminus	RB 71	Bielefeld Ost towards Rahden
Terminus	RB 73	Herford towards Lemgo-Lüttfeld
Preceding station		Following station
Terminus	RE 70	Herford towards Braunschweig Hbf
Preceding station	NordWestBahn	Following station
Brackwede towards Paderborn Hbf	RB 74	Terminus
Brackwede towards Osnabrück Hbf	RB 75	Terminus
Location

Bielefeld Hauptbahnhof is the main station in the region of Ostwestfalen-Lippe, in the German state of North Rhine-Westphalia. It is an important station because of the size of the city of Bielefeld and its location at the Bielefeld Pass, which makes it a node for long-distance and regional traffic. It was opened in 1847 with the opening of the Cologne-Minden trunk line. It is classified by Deutsche Bahn as a category 2 station.

== Station environment ==
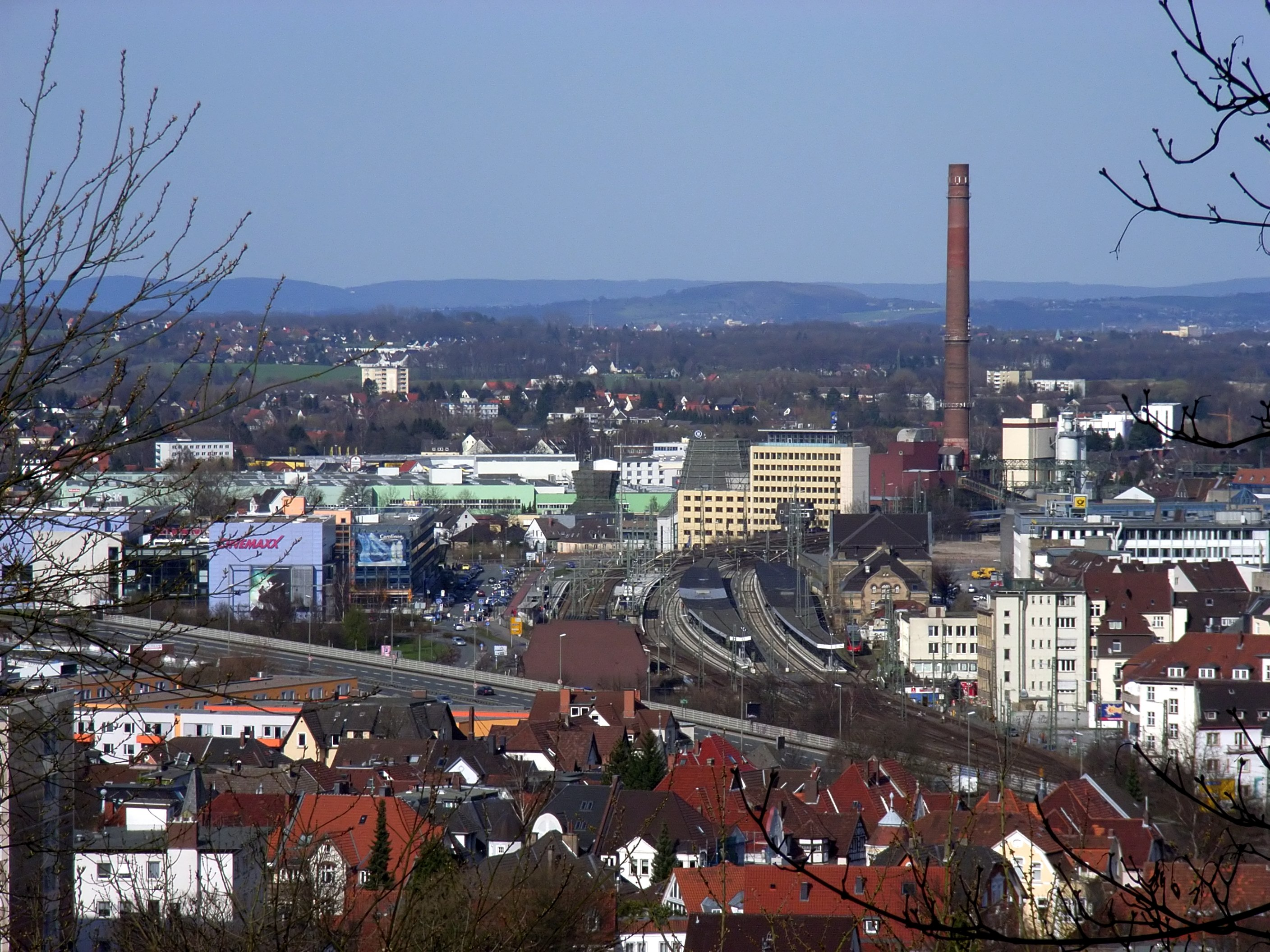
Station (centre), central post office (right), new station district (left), municipal utility (including power station) and Miele company (behind), Ostwestfalendamm expressway (in front)

Bielefeld Hauptbahnhof is located in the north-west of Bielefeld between the Neue Bahnhofsviertel (new station district) and the city centre. Not far from the station building is the entrance to the underground station on the Stadtbahn line running through the inner city. Opposite is the Stadthalle Bielefeld conference centre, which includes a hotel.

It is a through station on the Hamm–Minden railway, which runs through the city from the north-east to the south-west. Since it has no train shed, the platforms have individual canopies.

== History ==
At the opening of the Hamm–Minden railway section of the Cologne-Minden Railway Company’s trunk line on 15 October 1847, Bielefeld station had only a temporary wooden building. The first stone station building was completed in 1849. It was rebuilt and enlarged in 1885. The station at the time was far to the north of the city, because enough flat land was available there. Southwest of the station, the line passes close to the old town, but is already rising to cross the Bielefeld Pass. The almost one km between the old town and the station stimulated the development of public transport in Bielefeld. In the coming decades, the residential and industrial development of the city extended to the station and eventually beyond.

In the first decades not all express train stopped in Bielefeld. Minden as a seat of the provincial government and a fortress with a large garrison was more important to the government of Prussia than the industrial town of Bielefeld.

The number of passengers rose sharply, so that a new station building was required in Bielefeld. The construction of today's entrance building began in 1907. The Art Nouveau building with natural stone facades was opened on 1 May 1910. In the west wing there was a waiting room for first and second class passengers and a waiting room for third and fourth class passengers, in the east wing rail offices and apartments for rail staff. In the entrance hall there were a ticket office and a baggage counter. The entrance building originally had an adjoining platform. During the reconstruction of the Hamm–Minden line to four tracks between 1911 and 1917, six platform tracks were built on three platforms connected to the station building by passenger and baggage tunnels. Until the beginning of the 21st century the platforms were hardly changed. This means that track 1 runs directly alongside the station building and all the platforms are only accessible through the tunnel. A freight terminal building, which was stylistically matched to the entrance building, but without its natural stone facades, was built on the north side of the station's tracks.

The heavy air raids on Bielefeld in September 1944 left the station almost undamaged so that the façade is virtually unchanged despite several modernisations of the building. There is a memorial on the station forecourt in remembrance of the deportation of Jews to the extermination camps from Bielefeld station during the Nazi dictatorship.

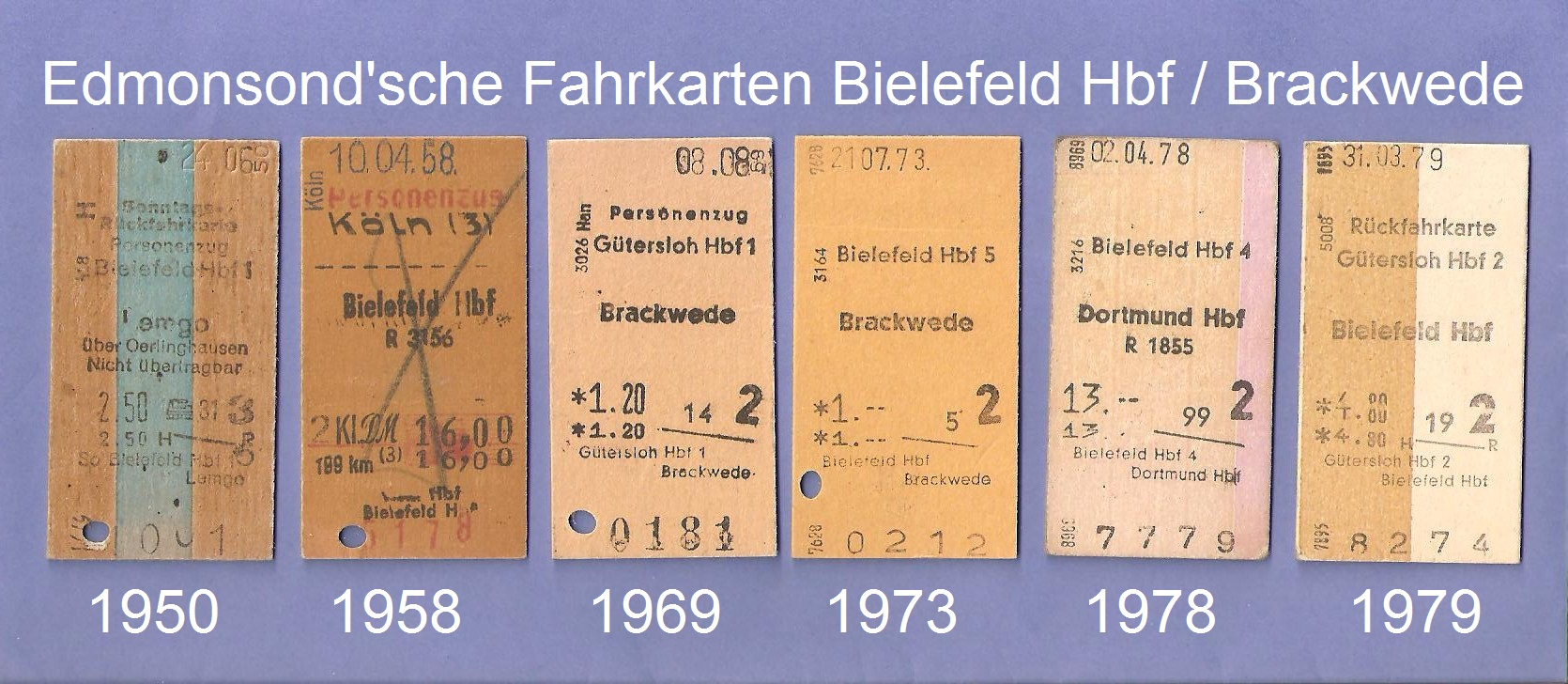
During the time of the Deutsche Bundesbahn 1950-1979, it issued Edmondson railway tickets for the local services to Brackwede, Gütersloh and Lemgo, as well as long-distance services to Cologne

In 1946 and 1947 Bielefeld station was the headquarters of the railways of the American and British occupation zone (Hauptverwaltung der Eisenbahnen des amerikanischen und britischen Besatzungsgebiets), from which Deutsche Bundesbahn emerged in 1949. The last act of the Deutsche Bundesbahn, Generalbetriebsleitung (general management) West, Bielefeld was to publish the official winter timetable for the period from 2 October 1949 to 13 May 1950.

The importance of the station in the railway network was consolidated with the electrification of the Hamm–Hanover main line on 29 September 1968 and the introduction of the Intercity-Express connection between Cologne and Berlin in the 1990s, stopping in Bielefeld, with connections at regular-intervals with regional services.

=== Recent reconstruction ===
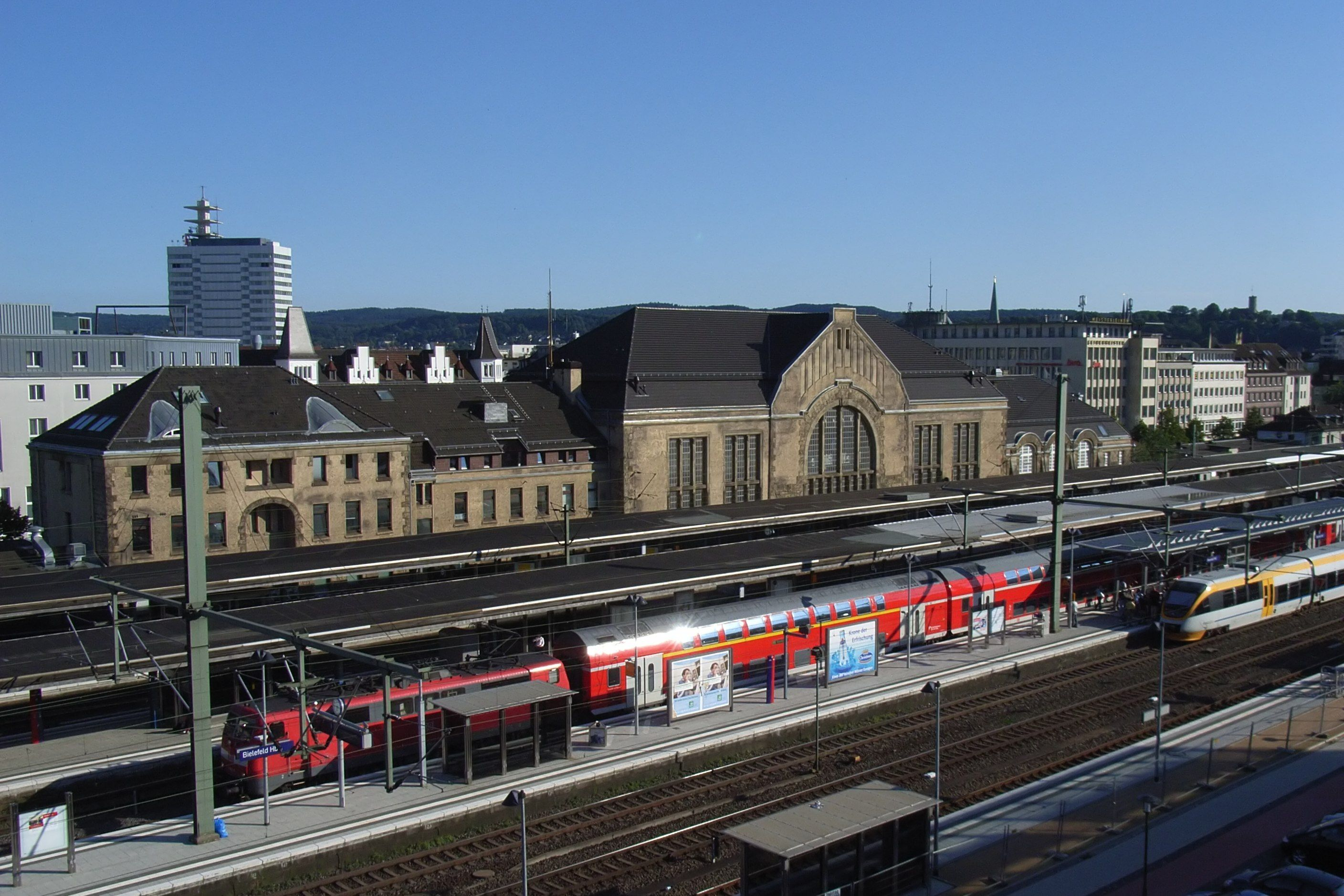
Bielefeld Hauptbahnhof, north-west view

During the rebuilding of the central sections of the Bielefeld tramway underground, the underground Stadtbahn station was not built under the Hauptbahnhof for cost reasons. The Hauptbahnhof Stadtbahn station was instead built 150 m to the south-east and is connected to the station forecourt by a covered travelator (popularly known as die Tüte: "the bag"). At the beginning of the 21st century the old freight yard to the north of the line was demolished to make room for an entrance and exit of the Ostwestfalendamm expressway and the Neue Bahnhofsviertel (new station district).

The construction included the widening and extension of the pedestrian tunnel to the north and the provision of barrier-free access to existing platforms and to the heritage-listed station building. Additional tracks and a new platform were built on the north side of the station. The station was expanded to seven platform tracks next to four platforms.

The expansion and modernisation of the station were intended to be completed in 2000. But after the bankruptcy of the general contractor, construction work was suspended due to unresolved financial issues for a period of 17 months. Since the reconstruction took place under traffic, this resulted in significant disruptions for passengers. Construction was finally completed in September 2006. These works cost a total of €26.2 million.

The station is now directly connected to the new station district on the north side, increasing the attractiveness of the city. The dining establishments, nightclubs, spa and leisure facilities benefit from the direct access to the station. The station district and the railway station also support each other, as for example the car park of the new district is also used by rail passengers.

== Rail services ==
Long-distance and regional services run from Bielefeld Hauptbahnhof on the Ruhr–Hanover line and regional services run within the Ostwestfalen-Lippe region. Because the station has only 7 platform tracks, individual platforms are sometimes occupied by two trains at the same time.

=== Long-distance ===
Line	Route			Frequency
ICE 10	Cologne –	Düsseldorf – Duisburg – Essen – Dortmund –	Hamm – Bielefeld – Hanover – Wolfsburg – Berlin – Berlin Ostbahnhof	Hourly
ICE 10	Cologne –	Wuppertal – Hagen –	Hamm – Bielefeld – Hanover – Wolfsburg – Berlin – Berlin Ostbahnhof	Hourly
ICE 14	Aachen – Mönchengladbach – Essen – Bochum – Dortmund – Hamm – Bielefeld – Hanover – Berlin – Berlin Ostbahnhof			Four trains a day
ICE 19	Berlin East – Berlin Hbf – Berlin-Spandau – Hanover – Bielefeld – Hagen – Wuppertal – Cologne (– Bonn – Koblenz – Mainz – Mannheim – Heidelberg – Stuttgart)			Every 2 hours
IC 55	Dresden – Leipzig – Magdeburg – Braunschweig – Hanover – Minden – Bad Oeynhausen – Herford – Bielefeld – Gütersloh – Hamm – Wuppertal – Cologne – Bonn – Koblenz – Mainz – Mannheim – Heidelberg – Stuttgart (– Tübingen)			Every 2 hours
FLX 30	Leipzig – Lutherstadt Wittenberg – Berlin Südkreuz – Berlin Hbf – Berlin-Spandau – Hannover – Bielefeld – Dortmund – Essen – Duisburg – Düsseldorf – Cologne – Aachen			1-2 train pairs daily

=== Regional services ===
Line	Name	Route	Frequency	Operator
RE 6	Rhein-Weser-Express	Minden (Westf) – Bielefeld – Hamm (Westf) – Dortmund – Essen – Duisburg – Düsseldorf – Neuss – Cologne – Cologne/Bonn Airport	Hourly	National Express
RB 61	Wiehengebirgs-Bahn	Bielefeld – Herford – Osnabrück – Rheine – Bad Bentheim	Hourly	eurobahn
RB 67	Der Warendorfer	Bielefeld – Gütersloh – Warendorf – Münster (Westf)	Hourly	eurobahn
RB 69	Ems-Börde-Bahn	Bielefeld – Hamm (Westf) – Münster (Westf)	Hourly	eurobahn
RE 70	Weser-Leine-Express	Bielefeld – Minden (Westf) – Hanover – Braunschweig	Every 2 hours	WestfalenBahn
RB 71	Ravensberger Bahn	Bielefeld – Herford – Bünde (Westf) – Rahden (Kr Lübbecke)	Hourly	eurobahn
RB 73	Der Lipperländer	Bielefeld – Lage (Lippe) – Lemgo	Hourly	eurobahn
RB 74	Senne-Bahn	Bielefeld – Sennestadt – Paderborn (continues as RB 84 to Holzminden)	Hourly	NordWestBahn
RB 75	Haller Willem	Bielefeld – Halle (Westf) – Osnabrück	Hourly	NordWestBahn
RE 78	Porta-Express	Bielefeld – Herford – Löhne (Westf) – Minden (Westf) – Nienburg (Weser) (Mo bis Fr)	Every 2 hours	eurobahn
RE 82	Der Leineweber	Bielefeld – Lage (Lippe) – Detmold (– Altenbeken)	Hourly	eurobahn

All regional trains, trams and buses can be used with Der Sechser (“the six”) fares of the Zweckverband Verkehrsverbund OWL (Ostwestfalen-Lippe transport association) and NRW-tariff fares. An exception to this rule are the night buses running between 1 AM and 5 AM. The Niedersachsen-Ticket can be used on the Regional-Express service RE 70 (Weser-Leine-Express) by buying a supplement from/to Herford.

== Stadtbahn connections ==
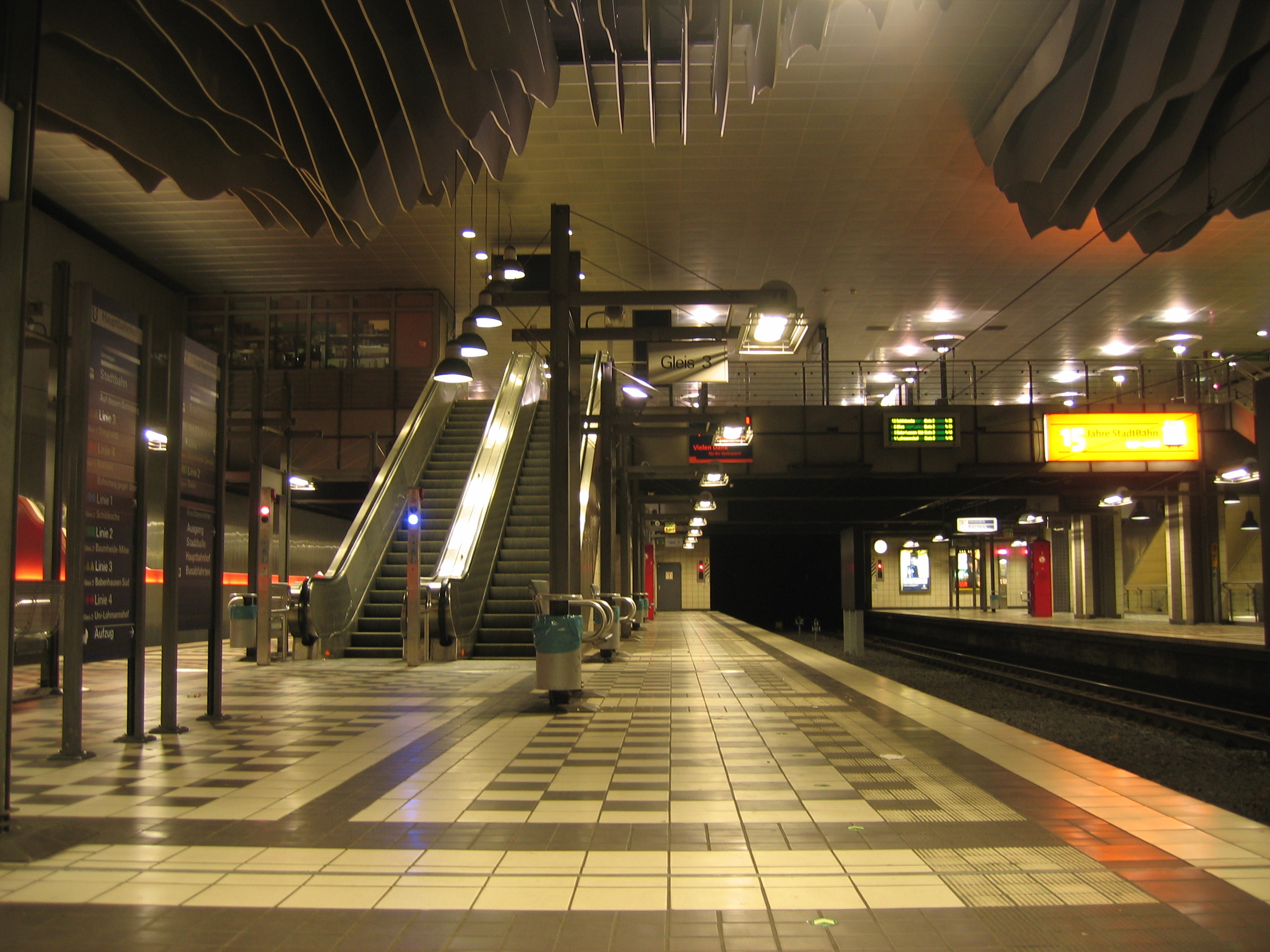
Hauptbahnhof Stadtbahn station

The underground Stadtbahn station is served by all Stadtbahn lines:

Line	Route
Line 1	Schildesche – Hauptbahnhof – Jahnplatz – Bethel – Brackwede – Senne
Line 2	Altenhagen – Milse – Baumheide – Hauptbahnhof – Jahnplatz – Sieker
Line 3	Babenhausen-Süd – Hauptbahnhof – Jahnplatz – Dürkopp Tor 6
Line 4	Lohmannshof – Universität – Hauptbahnhof – Jahnplatz – Sieker Mitte – Stieghorst Zentrum

Buses run from the station forecourt to, among other places, Bad Salzuflen, Leopoldshöhe, Borgholzhausen, Gütersloh and Steinhagen. These also serve urban destinations, such as Heepen, Dornsberg and Quelle (Bielefeld). Nevertheless, the central bus transfer point in Bielefeld is located at Jahnplatz (a stadbahn stop away), where buses run in all directions.

== Parking and cycle facilities ==
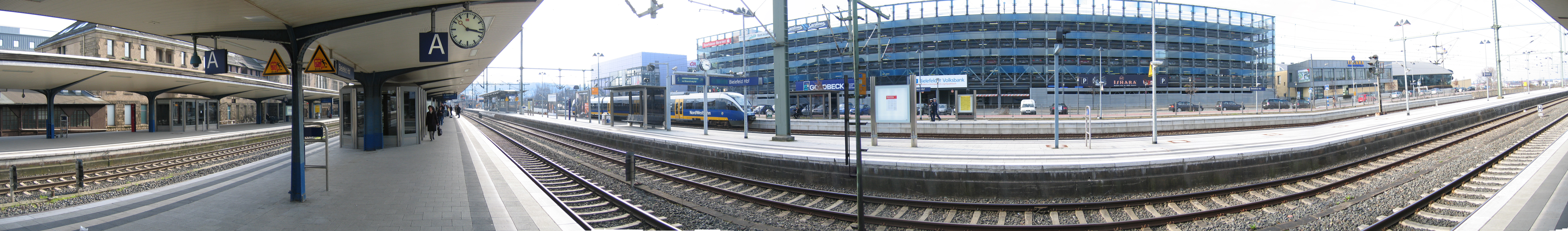
View from track 4 to track 5 and 6

There is a parking area In the new station district on the north-west side of the station. There is cycle parking right next to the station building. Alternatively, it is possible to hire bikes and electric bikes.

== Access ==
The main entrance is located in the station forecourt (Bahnhofsplatz), just 200 metres walk from the entrance to the Stadtbahn station. It is accessible by barrier-free lifts and moving walkways. Furthermore, the station is accessible from the new station district, which lies on the opposite side of the station.

Platform tracks 1 to 6 are accessible by wheelchair using lifts and the underpass. Track 8 can be reached from ground level from the new station district, which can be reached by lift and underpass from the station building.

== See also ==
- Rail transport in Germany
- Railway stations in Germany

== Bibliography ==
- Werner Menninghaus (1983). Die Cöln-Mindener Eisenbahn in Ostwestfalen. Vom Planzug 1 bis zum Intercity (in German). Lübbecke: Verlag Uhle & Kleimann. ISBN 3-922657-27-3.
- Jürgen Büschenfeld; Wolfgang Klee; Rüdiger Ufmann (1997). Bahnen in Bielefeld (in German). Nordhorn: Verlag Kenning. ISBN 3-927587-75-3.
