= Hamm (Westfalen) Hauptbahnhof =

Railway station in North Rhine-Westphalia, Germany

Hamm (Westf) Hbf
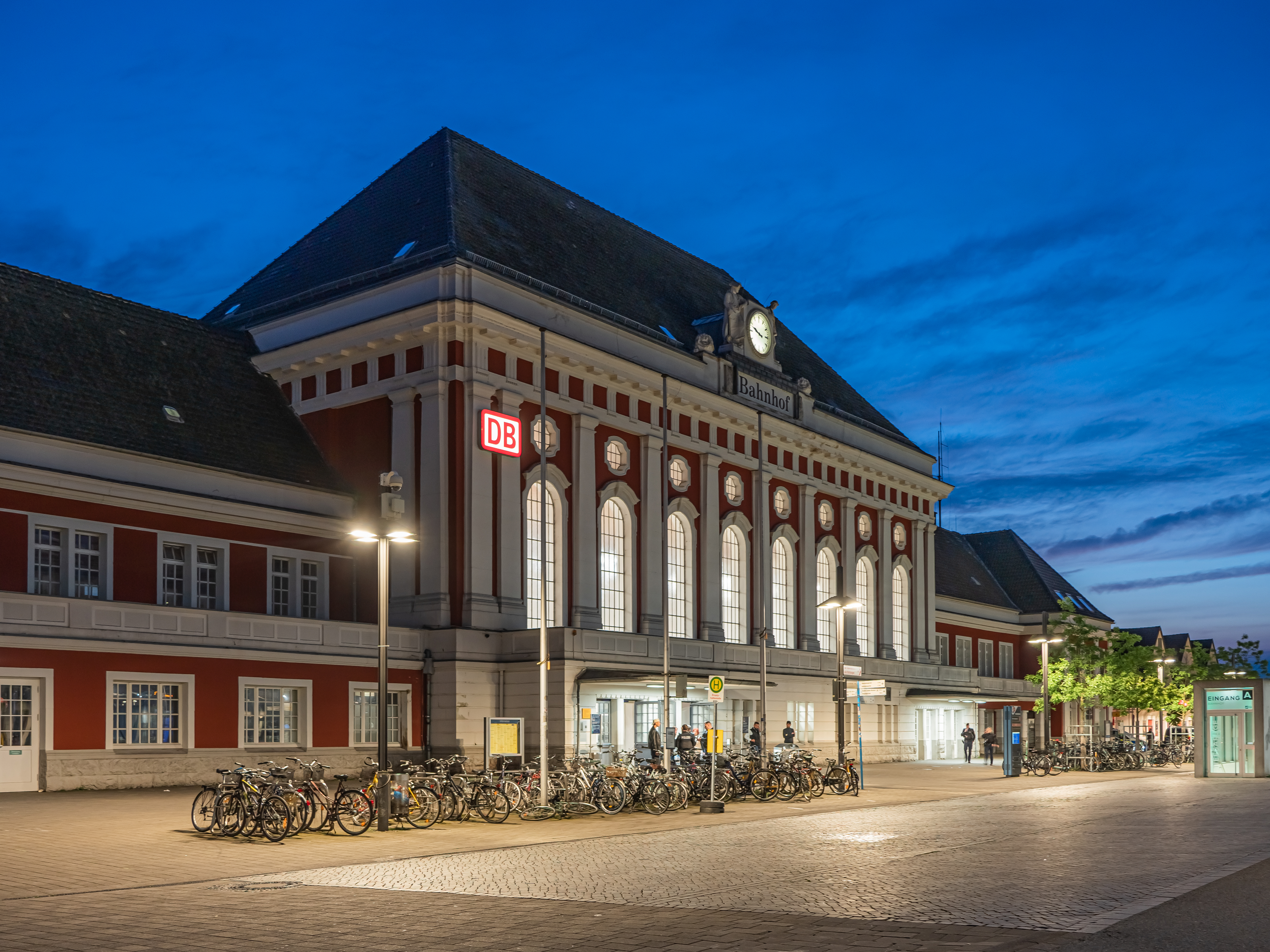
- Station hall

General information
- Location: Willy-Brandt-Platz 1b, Hamm, North Rhine-Westphalia; Germany
- Coordinates: 51°40′42″N 7°48′30″E
- Owner: Deutsche Bahn
- Operator: DB Netz; DB Station&Service
- Lines: Dortmund–Hamm (KBS 415); Hamm–Minden (KBS 400); Münster–Hamm (KBS 410, 455); Hamm–Warburg (KBS 430); Hagen–Hamm (KBS 455); Oberhausen-Osterfeld–Hamm
- Platforms: 7 island platforms
- Tracks: 20
- Train operators: DB Fernverkehr; DB Regio NRW; Eurobahn; National Express Germany

Construction
- Accessible: Yes
- Architectural style: Historicism

Other information
- Station code: 2528
- DS100 code: EHM
- IBNR: 8000149
- Category: 2
- Fare zone: Westfalentarif: 42101
- Website: www.bahnhof.de

History
- Opened: 2 May 1847; 179 years ago

Key dates
- 14 October 1920; 105 years ago: New Station building

Services
Preceding station	DB Fernverkehr	Following station
Dortmund Hbf towards Köln Hbf	ICE 10	Gütersloh Hbf towards Berlin Ostbahnhof
Hagen Hbf towards Köln Hbf	ICE 10	Gütersloh Hbf towards Berlin Ostbahnhof
Dortmund Hbf towards Aachen Hbf	ICE 14	Gütersloh Hbf towards Berlin Ostbahnhof
Hagen Hbf One-way operation	ICE 19	Bielefeld Hbf towards Berlin Ostbahnhof
Dortmund Hbf towards Frankfurt (Main) Hbf or Friedberg (Hess)	IC 34	Münster Hbf Terminus
Dortmund Hbf towards Köln Hbf	IC 51	Reverses direction
Hamm towards Gera Hbf	IC 51	Reverses direction
Dortmund Hbf towards Köln Hbf	IC 55	Gütersloh Hbf towards Dresden Hbf
Preceding station	National Express Germany	Following station
Nordbögge towards Aachen Hbf	RE 1 (NRW-Express)	Terminus
Kamen towards Cologne/Bonn Airport	RE 6 (Rhein-Weser-Express)	Heessen towards Minden
Bönen towards Krefeld Hbf	RE 7 (Rhein-Münsterland-Express)	Drensteinfurt towards Rheine
Kamen towards Düsseldorf Hbf	RE 11 (Rhein-Hellweg-Express)	Soest (Germany) towards Kassel-Wilhelmshöhe
Preceding station		Following station
Nordbögge towards Düsseldorf Hbf	RE 3	Terminus
Bönen towards Venlo	RE 13	Terminus
Bockum-Hövel towards Münster Hbf	RB 69	Heessen towards Bielefeld Hbf
Bockum-Hövel towards Münster Hbf	RB 89	Welver towards Warburg
Location

Hamm (Westfalen) Hauptbahnhof (often abbreviated Hamm (Westf) Hbf, Hamm (Westf) or simply Hamm (W)) is a railway station situated in the city of Hamm in the German state of North Rhine-Westphalia. It is notable for its station building inspired by art deco and Gründerzeit building styles. The station is one of the important InterCityExpress rail hubs in the eastern Ruhr area and is among the high-profile buildings of Hamm. Until the decline of rail freight after the Second World War, it featured one of Europe's largest marshalling yards.

== History ==
The station at Hamm was opened on 2 May 1847, when the first train of the Köln-Mindener Eisenbahn reached the city. It had been planned from the very beginning to make Hamm a railway hub, therefore the line to Münster (1848) and the line to Paderborn via Soest (1850) were opened soon thereafter. Both lines were built and operated by the Königlich-Westfälische Eisenbahn. Finally, in 1866, the Bergisch-Märkische Eisenbahn connected their line to Hagen via Unna to the growing station.

Due to the explosive increase in traffic at the height of the industrial age, the station was soon unable to cope with the growing demand. A separate marshalling yard was built in the 1880s, situated on the southern side of the passenger station. However, this did not provide real relief, and therefore the station area underwent major reconstruction starting in 1911 and finishing by 1929. The railway lines were laid on elevated embankments and the trackbed inside the station was raised, the old station building, originally built as an island platform, was torn down and replaced by the current building, the construction of which was finished by 1920.

The original marshalling yard was replaced by a new structure further south, consisting of three hump yards. The yard serving the east–west trains (operated from signal box Hvw) was one of the first to receive a mechanised hump in 1925. Two new depots were also built near the station, Hammburger P for passenger services and Hamm G for freight operations.

Over the years, Hamm prospered and grew quite notably due to its newfound role as a railway town.

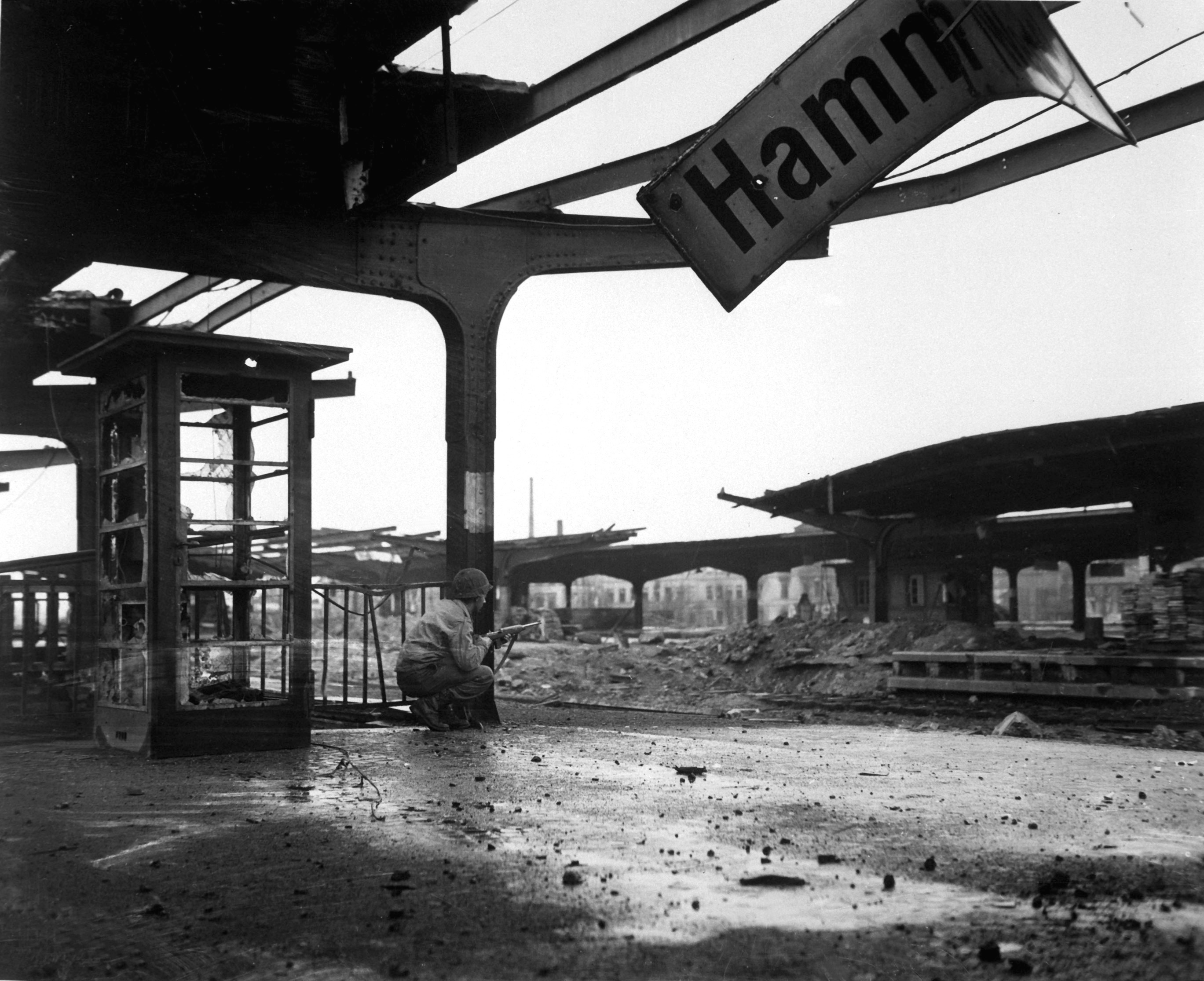
Hamm station upon capture by the United States Army, 6 April 1945

During World War II, the station was a prime target due to its strategic location and its large marshalling yard and suffered from numerous air attacks. Most of these were carried out by the British RAF Bomber Command. Over 80% of Hamm lay in ruins after the war, and the station was no exception. Passenger services resumed on 18 June 1945 on the line to Dortmund and Duisburg, and on 20 June 1945 on the lines to Bielefeld, Münster and Soest; only 6 weeks after the end of the war.

The first line to be electrified was the line from Hammburger to Düsseldorf Hbf on 10 May 1957. Electrification continued over the next decades, and was finished in December 1970 with the line to Paderborn.

In 1984, Hamm started to see InterCity services calling at the station, and since the early 1990s InterCityExpress trains call at the station as well.

The marshalling yard, despite having been renovated in the 1960s, was partly closed after Deutsche Bundesbahn became the private Deutsche Bahn. Of the three humps originally present in the yard, two of them (near signal boxes Hro and Vmo) were closed. The marshalling yard nowadays operates at only 10% of its original 10,000 wagon per day capacity. The two depots and the maintenance works are also operating at reduced capacity. The mail station, which even had its own hump, has been completely closed as mail trains were abolished soon after the privatization of the former Deutsche Bundespost in the early 1990s. The access tracks have been removed and the area was sold off to investors.

On 15 December 2019, Deutsche Bahn redesignated the station from Bahnhof "station" to Hauptbahnhof (Hbf) "central station".

== Station building ==
The current station hall was opened on 14 October 1920. It is an example of the historism building style, reminiscent of the German Gründerzeit style and incorporating Jugendstil elements, designed by an unknown architect.

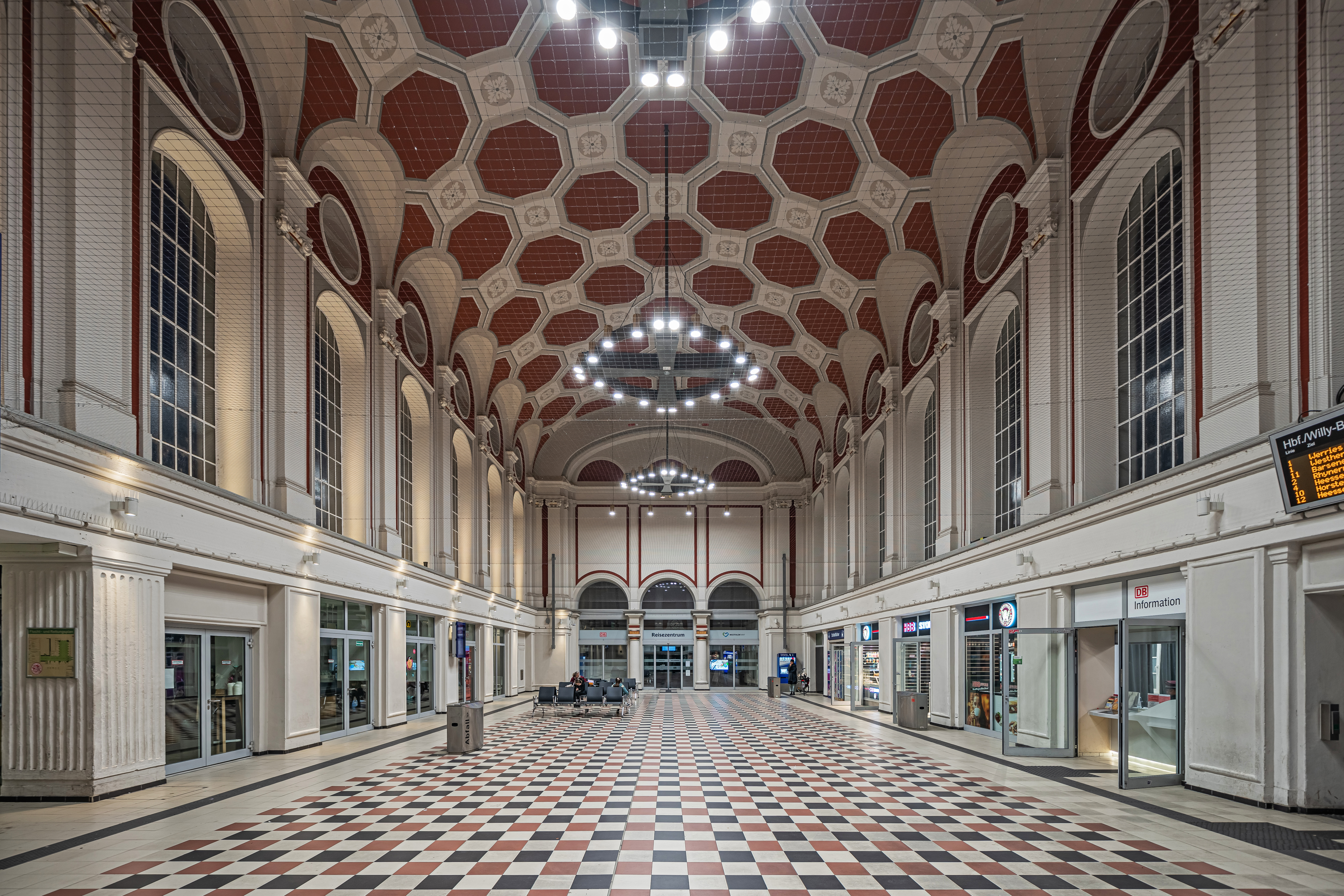
Inside the station hall

The building sustained damage to parts of the roof and the vault during World War II, but was swiftly rebuilt after the war.

In 1985, the station hall was modernised in a contemporary style, and the front walls were clad with sheet metal. A new ticket hall made of glass was also added into the main station hall. Public opinion, however, was not in favour of the typical 1980s building style, and the topic of renovation resurfaced as early as the mid-1990s. The station therefore was restored to its original state. Since the station hall had become a listed building in 1990, great attention was paid to detail. The station received the Europa Nostra Award in 2001 for the restoration effort.

== Operational usage ==
=== Services at the station ===
The station building is fully accessible to the disabled and features lifts to all platforms except to tracks 12 and 13. The ticket hall is open Mon to Fri 6:00 to 19:30, Sat 7:30 to 18:00 and Sun 9:30 to 19:00. There also is a service desk in the station hall, as well as a bistro, a bakery, a pharmacy and a bookshop. The railway mission is situated near platform 3.

With the exceptions of lines 7, and 17, all of Hamm's city buses call at the stop in front of the station. There are 220 free park and ride spaces for commuters. Local car parks have 800 bays, with another 200 to be added in a newly built car park at the western exit. There also is a guarded bicycle stand which can hold 780 bicycles.

=== Trains ===
The station is an important hub with frequent services to Bielefeld, Münster, Dortmund, Hagen and Soest. Hourly InterCityExpress services run to Berlin Ostbahnhof via Berlin Hbf, with trainsets coming from Cologne Bonn Airport (via Köln-Deutz, Düsseldorf, Duisburg, Essen Hauptbahnhof and Dortmund Hauptbahnhof) and Bonn Hbf (via Wuppertal and Hagen Hbf). The individual trainsets are then coupled together to continue their journey to Berlin via Bielefeld and Hannover.

A bi-hourly InterCity line runs from the Ruhr valley to Magdeburg Hbf via Hannover. Another IC line connects Hamm to Kassel-Wilhelmshöhe and Erfurt. Furthermore, many local services call at the station. The RE lines 1, 3 and 13 terminate at Hamm, whilst RE lines 6, 7 and 11 as well as RB line 69 and 89 call at the station. Hamm is also the terminus of the Hamm-Osterfelder Bahn, which lost its passenger traffic in 1983 but is still a notable freight railway.

In the 2026 timetable, the following services stop at the station:

Line	Route			Frequency
ICE 10	Cologne –	Düsseldorf – Duisburg – Essen – Dortmund –	Hamm – Bielefeld – Hanover – Wolfsburg – Berlin – Berlin Ostbahnhof	Hourly
ICE 10	Cologne –	Wuppertal – Hagen –	Hamm – Bielefeld – Hanover – Wolfsburg – Berlin – Berlin Ostbahnhof	Hourly
ICE 14	Aachen – Mönchengladbach – Essen – Bochum – Dortmund – Hamm – Bielefeld – Hanover – Berlin – Berlin Ostbahnhof			Four trains a day
ICE 41	Hamm – Dortmund – Essen – Duisburg – Düsseldorf – Köln Messe/Deutz – Frankfurt Airport – Frankfurt – Würzburg – Nuremberg – Munich			1 train (Sat)
ICE 41	Hamm – Dortmund – Essen – Duisburg – Düsseldorf – Köln Messe/Deutz – Frankfurt – Würzburg – Nuremberg – Munich			1 train (Sun)
ICE 41	Munich – Nuremberg – Würzburg – Fulda – Kassel-Wilhelmshöhe – Paderborn – Hamm – Dortmund – Düsseldorf (– Cologne / Köln Messe/Deutz – Wiesbaden – Frankfurt)			Some trains
IC 34	Frankfurt am Main / Friedberg – Wetzlar – Siegen – Dortmund/Unna – Hamm – Münster			2 train pairs
ICE 43	Hanover – Bielefeld – Hamm – Dortmund – Hagen – Wuppertal – Solingen – Cologne – Siegburg/Bonn – Frankfurt Airport – Mannheim – Karlsruhe – Freiburg – Basel			1 train pair
IC 51	Gera – Jena-Göschwitz – Weimar – Erfurt – Eisenach – Kassel – Hamm – Dortmund – Düsseldorf (– Cologne)			1 train pair
IC 55	Leipzig – Halle – Magdeburg – Braunschweig – Hannover – Bielefeld – Hamm – Dortmund – (Essen – Duisburg – Düsseldorf –) or (Hagen – Wuppertal – Solingen –) Cologne – Bonn – Koblenz – Mainz – Mannheim – Heidelberg – Vaihingen (Enz) – Stuttgart (– Plochingen – Reutlingen – Tübingen)			120 min

In regional passenger service, Hamm is served by several regional services (as of 2026):

Line	Route	Frequency
RE 1 NRW-Express	Aachen – Eschweiler – Düren – Horrem – Cologne – Düsseldorf – Düsseldorf Airport – Duisburg – Mülheim – Essen – Bochum – Dortmund – Hamm	60 min
RE 3 Rhein-Emscher-Express	Düsseldorf – Duisburg – Oberhausen – Essen-Altenessen – Gelsenkirchen – Wanne-Eickel – Herne – Castrop-Rauxel – Dortmund – Kamen – Hamm	60 min
RE 6 Rhein-Weser-Express	Minden – Herford – Bielefeld – Hamm – Dortmund – Essen – Mülheim – Duisburg – Düsseldorf Airport – Düsseldorf – Neuss – Cologne – Cologne/Bonn Airport	60 min
RE 7 Rhein-Münsterland-Express	Krefeld – Neuss – Cologne – Solingen – Wuppertal – Hagen – Hamm – Münster – Rheine	60 mins
RE 11; Rhein-Hellweg-Express	Düsseldorf – Düsseldorf Airport – Duisburg – Mülheim – Essen – Dortmund – Hamm – Paderborn (– Kassel-Wilhelmshöhe)	60 min
RB 69	Münster – Hamm – Gütersloh – Bielefeld	60 mins
RB 89	Münster – Hamm – Paderborn (– Warburg)	60 mins

== See also ==
- Rail transport in Germany
- Railway stations in Germany
