= Eurobahn =

German train operating company

- Formerly: Eurobahn Verkehrsgesellschaft mbH & Co KG (1998–2001) Rhenus Keolis (2001–2007) Keolis Deutschland GmbH & Co. KG (2007–2021)
- Company type: GmbH & Co. KG
- Industry: Rail transport
- Founded: 1998
- Headquarters: Düsseldorf, Germany
- Area served: North Rhine-Westphalia
- Key people: Anne Mathieu; Karsten Schulz
- Parent: Zweckverband Nahverkehr Westfalen-Lippe (NWL)
- Website: www.eurobahn.de

Eurobahn GmbH & Co. KG is a railway operator in Germany, established in 1998. It operates 15 regional train services in 4 contracts in the state of North Rhine-Westphalia, with cross-border services including Lower Saxony and the Netherlands.

It is temporarily owned by Zweckverband Nahverkehr Westfalen-Lippe, the rail authority for eastern North Rhine-Westphalia, where the majority of Eurobahn's services operate.

Initially a joint venture between Keolis and Rhenus operating bus and rail services, it became a 100% Keolis subsidiary operating rail services in 2007. From 1 January 2022 until May 2025, it was owned by the law firm Noerr.

== History ==
=== Company history ===
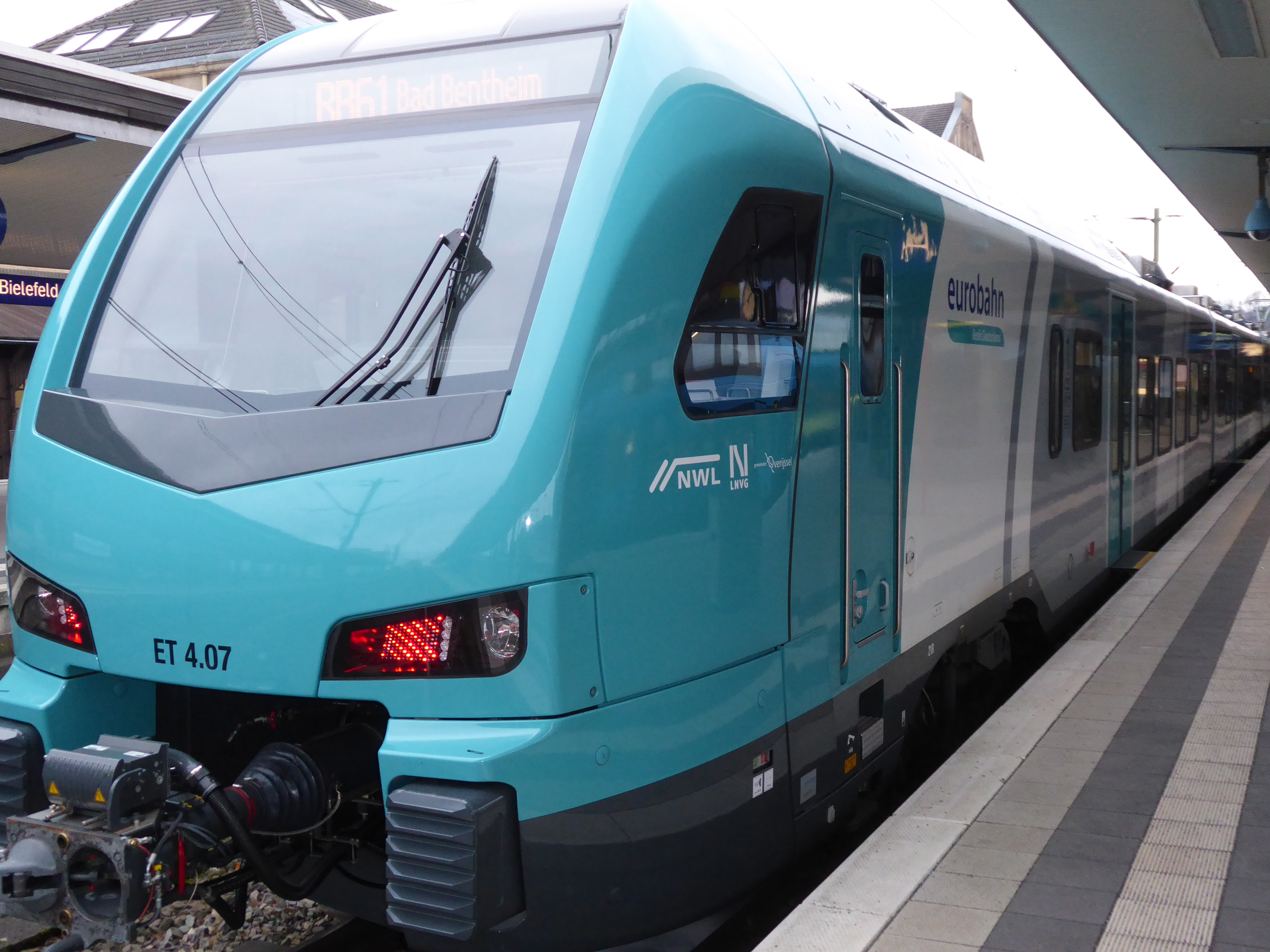
Stadler Flirt in January 2018

Eurobahn was founded as Eurobahn Verkehrsgesellschaft mbH & Co KG, later Rhenus Keolis, in 1998 as a 60/40 joint venture between Keolis (then VIA-GTI) and Rhenus.

In December 2007, the joint venture was dissolved; Rhenus taking ownership of the bus operations and two railway contracts under the name Rhenus Veniro, Keolis taking full ownership of Eurobahn, renaming the company as Keolis Deutschland GmbH & Co. KG.

In October 2021, Keolis announced its intention to sell the business and exit the German market. The business was sold to Team Treuhand, a subsidiary of Noerr law firm, effective 31 December 2021, while renaming it to its present name.

In May 2025, Eurobahn was taken over for one symbolic Euro by Zweckverband Nahverkehr Westfalen-Lippe, the rail authority for eastern North Rhine-Westphalia, where the majority of Eurobahn's services operate.

=== Regional rail services ===
Overview:

| Contract | Contract commenced | Contract finishes | Rail authorities | Lines | Rolling stock | Volume |
|---|---|---|---|---|---|---|
| Ostwestfalen-Lippe-Netz | May 2000, renewed December 2013 | December 2028 | NWL | RB71, RB73 (since 2000), RB67, RE82 (since 2013) | 24× Bombardier Talent (3-car) | 2.2 million train-km/year |
| Hellweg-Netz | December 2008, renewed December 2018 | December 2030 | NWL, VRR | RB50, RB59, RB69, RB89 | 25× Stadler Flirt 1 (4-car) 5× Stadler Flirt 3 (5-car) | 5.9 million train-km/year |
| Maas-Rhein-Lippe-Netz | December 2009 | December 2026 | VRR, NWL | RE3, RE13 | 14× Stadler Flirt 1 (5-car) 4× Stadler Flirt 1 (4-car) | 3.3 million train-km/year |
| Teutoburger-Wald-Netz | December 2017 | December 2032 | NWL, LNVG, Overijssel | RB61, RB65, RB66, RB72, RE78 | 14× Stadler Flirt 1 (3-car) 5× Stadler Flirt 1 (5-car) 8× Stadler Flirt 3 (5-car) | 5.3 million train-km/year |

In May 2000, Eurobahn commenced operating two rail services in the East Westphalia-Lippe region (OWL) in North Rhine-Westphalia. In 2013 the OWL contract was renewed until December 2028 with an additional two routes added.

From December 2003 until December 2011, Eurobahn operated the Weser-/Lammetalbahn contract.

On 14 December 2008, Eurobahn commenced operating the Hellweg Net services. In 2015, the contract was extended until 2030.

In December 2009, Eurobahn commenced operating the Maas-Rhine-Lippe network until December 2026.

In December 2017, Eurobahn commenced operating the Teutoburger Wald network until December 2032.

Eurobahn was scheduled to commence operating Rhine-Ruhr S-Bahn routes S1 and S4 under contract to Verkehrsverbund Rhein-Ruhr (VRR) in December 2019. However with Eurobahn unable to recruit enough drivers before the contract commenced, VRR cancelled the contract with incumbent DB Regio awarded a short-term contract instead.

=== Long-distance rail services ===
From December 2000, Eurobahn operated an open-access long-distance rail service between Cologne and Bielefeld, using its Bombardier Talent rail cars offering fares as low as 40 DM, a third less than its competitor DB Reise & Touristik. Due to insufficient patronage, the service was withdrawn in January 2001.

Since December 2016, Eurobahn is providing the train drivers for the Eurostar high-speed rail service (originally Thalys) for its German section between Aachen, Cologne, Düsseldorf and Dortmund.

== Services ==
Eurobahn operate services on the following lines:

=== Current ===
| Line no. | Line name | Route | Contract | Contract commenced | Contract finishes |
|---|---|---|---|---|---|
| RE 3 | Rhein-Emscher-Express | Düsseldorf – Düsseldorf Flughafen – Duisburg – Oberhausen – Gelsenkirchen – Herne – Dortmund – Hamm | Maas-Rhein-Lippe-Netz | December 2009 | December 2026 |
| RE 13 | Maas-Wupper-Express | Venlo – Viersen – Mönchengladbach – Düsseldorf – Wuppertal – Hagen – Hamm | Maas-Rhein-Lippe-Netz | December 2009 | December 2026 |
| RB 50 | Der Lüner | Dortmund – Lünen – Münster | Hellweg-Netz | December 2008 | December 2030 |
| RB 59 | Hellweg-Bahn | Dortmund – Unna – Soest | Hellweg-Netz | December 2008 | December 2030 |
| RB 61 | Wiehengebirgsbahn | Bielefeld – Osnabrück – Rheine – Bad Bentheim – Hengelo | Teutoburger Wald-Netz | December 2017 | December 2032 |
| RB 65 | Ems-Bahn | Münster – Rheine | Teutoburger Wald-Netz | December 2017 | December 2032 |
| RB 66 | Teuto-Bahn | Münster – Osnabrück | Teutoburger Wald-Netz | December 2017 | December 2032 |
| RB 67 | Der Warendorfer | Münster – Warendorf – Gütersloh – Bielefeld | Ostwestfalen-Lippe-Netz | December 2013 | December 2028 |
| RB 69 | Ems-Börde-Bahn | Münster – Hamm – Bielefeld | Hellweg-Netz | December 2008 | December 2030 |
| RB 71 | Ravensberger Bahn | Bielefeld – Herford – Bünde – Rahden | Ostwestfalen-Lippe-Netz | December 2000 | December 2028 |
| RB 72 | Ostwestfalen-Bahn | Herford – Detmold – Altenbeken – Paderborn | Teutoburger Wald-Netz | December 2017 | December 2032 |
| RB 73 | Der Lipperländer | Bielefeld – Lage – Lemgo | Ostwestfalen-Lippe-Netz | December 2000 | December 2028 |
| RE 78 | Porta-Express | Nienburg – Minden – Bielefeld | Teutoburger Wald-Netz | December 2017 | December 2032 |
| RE 82 | Der Leineweber | Bielefeld – Lage – Detmold – Altenbeken | Ostwestfalen-Lippe-Netz | December 2013 | December 2028 |
| RB 89 | Ems-Börde-Bahn | Münster – Hamm – Paderborn – Warburg | Hellweg-Netz | December 2008 | December 2030 |
| Eurostar | | (Paris – Brussels –) Aachen – Cologne – Düsseldorf – Essen – Dortmund | – | December 2016 | – |

=== Former ===
Eurobahn formerly operated the following services:

| Line | Route | Network | Contract commenced | Contract finished | Successor operator |
|---|---|---|---|---|---|
| RB 77 | Hildesheim – Hameln – Löhne – Bünde | Weser-/Lammetalbahn | December 2003 | December 2011 | NordWestBahn |
| RB 79 | Hildesheim – Bodenburg | Weser-/Lammetalbahn | December 2003 | December 2011 | NordWestBahn |

== Rolling stock ==
The Eurobahn fleet consists of Bombardier Talents and Stadler Flirts.
