= Rhein-Weser-Express =

Passenger train

RE 6 Rhein-Weser-Express
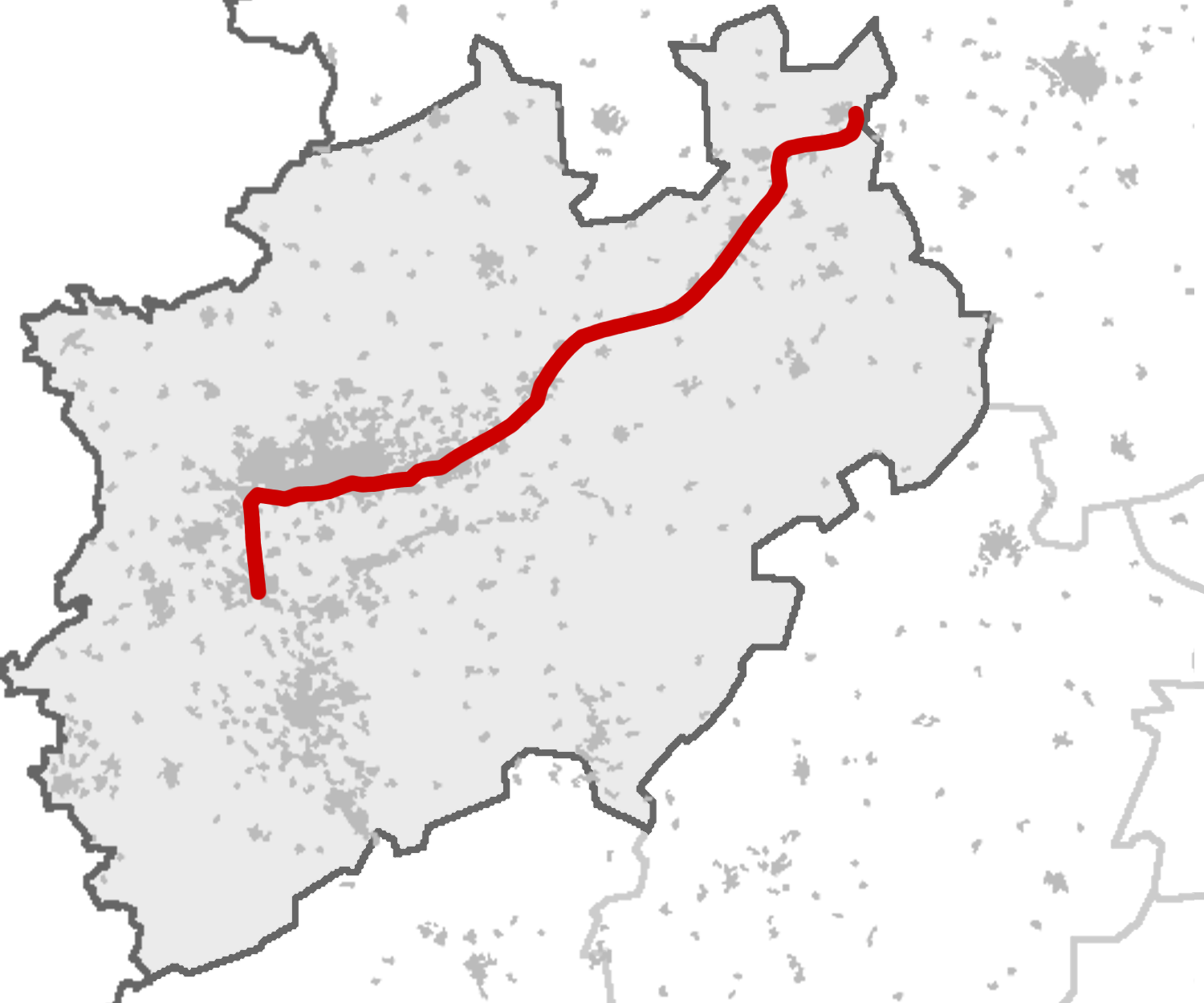

Overview
- Locale: North Rhine-Westphalia, Germany

Service
- Route number: 370 (Minden–Bielefeld); 400 (Bielefeld–Hamm); 415.1/2 (Hamm–Düsseldorf); 485 (Düsseldorf–Neuss); 495 (Neuss–Cologne); 465 (Cologne–Cologne/Bonn Airport)

Technical
- Line length: 280 km (170 mi)
- Operating speed: 160 km/h (99 mph) (maximum)

The Rhein Weser Express (RE 6) is a Regional-Express service route in the German state of North Rhine-Westphalia, connecting cities in Northeast Westphalia (among others Minden, Bielefeld and Hamm) with the Ruhr (especially Dortmund, Bochum, Essen, Duisburg, Düsseldorf, Neuss and Cologne). Cologne, Neuss, Düsseldorf and Duisburg lie on the Rhine while Minden lies on the Weser.

Until the timetable change in December 2016, this service was called the Westfalen-Express and ended in Düsseldorf Hauptbahnhof. The line is part of the Rhine-Ruhr Express (RRX) network and is operated by National Express.

== History ==
Until the timetable revision of 2002, the NRW-Express (RE 1) operated with five, and sometimes up to eight, double-deck carriages from Aachen to Bielefeld. In 2002 services were extended to Minden and at the same time the service was split into two routes. The Westfalen-Express was established, taking over the Hamm–Bielefeld–Minden section and extending to Düsseldorf. This change was intended in particular to improve the timeliness of the entire service.

A service called line RE 6a was put into operation as a pre-operation for the Rhein-Ruhr-Express on 13 December 2015. For the first time, Düsseldorf Hauptbahnhof was regularly connected with Cologne/Bonn Airport, serving on the way Neuss Hauptbahnhof, Dormagen, Cologne Hauptbahnhof, with some services also stopping in Köln Messe/Deutz in the peak.

This interim line was scheduled to be operated with double sets of class 425 EMUs. The reason for the temporary separation of RE 6 and RE 6a was the lack of emergency brake connections between the double-deck cars used on line RE 6 (Minden–Düsseldorf), which were not allowed to run through the Cologne Airport loop.

At the change of timetable in December 2016, the rolling stock was replaced by retrofitted double-decker trains, the RE 6 was extended to Cologne/Bonn Airport and the line RE 6a service was discontinued. The RE 6 services has been named the Rhein-Weser-Express since its extension. Since the timetable change in December 2019, the Rhein-Weser-Express has been operated by National Express with Siemens Desiro HC EMUs.

== Route ==
The Rhein-Weser-Express runs on a total of four railway lines:

- all of the Hamm–Minden line (which carries all forms of regional and long-distance passenger services and freight traffic over a four-track route.)
- all of the Dortmund–Hamm (which carries all forms of regional and long-distance passenger services)
- all of the Dortmund-Duisburg line (on the long-distance tracks, which carry all regional and long-distance services),
- the Cologne–Duisburg line between Duisburg and Düsseldorf. In this four to six track section the Rhein-Weser-Express uses the S-Bahn tracks or the so-called local tracks where they exist, along with the Rhein-Haard-Express (RE 2) and the Rhein-Emscher-Express (RE 3), the Rhein-Hellweg-Express (RE 11) and the Rhein-IJssel-Express (RE 19). Only the NRW-Express (RE 1) and the Rhein-Express (RE 5) use the long-distance tracks.
- the Mönchengladbach–Düsseldorf railway between Düsseldorf and Neuss (together with other regional services),
- the Lower Left Rhine Railway between Neuss and Cologne (together with other regional and S-Bahn services and freight trains).
- the Hohenzollern Bridge between Cologne Hbf and Köln Messe/Deutz (together with all regional and long-distance trains),
- the Sieg Railway between Köln Messe/Deutz and the Cologne Airport Northwest junction (together with all regional and long-distance trains),
- the Cologne Airport loop to Cologne/Bonn Airport (together with all S-Bahn, regional and long-distance trains).

Like the Rhein-Emscher-Express, the Rhein-Weser-Express runs for a large part of its route of the trunk line of the Cologne-Minden Railway Company (German: Cöln-Mindener Eisenbahn-Gesellschaft, CME). Between Dortmund and Duisburg, however, it uses the more developed and more centrally located route through the Ruhr built by the Bergisch-Märkische Railway Company (Bergisch-Märkische Eisenbahn-Gesellschaft, BME).

== Rail services ==
Since the timetable change in December 2010, the Rhein-Weser-Express has run during the day at hourly intervals from Minden to Düsseldorf (extending to Cologne/Bonn Airport since December 2016), over the whole route between 0700 and 2200. Until the timetable change in December 2010 some services in the off-peak lengths turned around in Dortmund, Bielefeld or Hamm.

Frequencies are increased by other services: the NRW-Express also runs between Hamm and Cologne and the Rhein-Hellweg-Express (RE 11) runs between Hamm and Düsseldorf, the Ems-Börde-Bahn (RB 69) runs between Bielefeld and Hamm, the Weser-Leine-Express (RE 70) and the Porta-Express (RE 78) run between Bielefeld and Minden.

Large sections of the RE 6 proceeds parallel with S-Bahn lines and it has some of the character of a fast S-Bahn service and is perceived by passengers accordingly.

Until 2016, the service was operated by DB Regio NRW, using push–pull trains of five double-deck carriages, mostly hauled by class 146.0 locomotives. Class 111 electric locomotives were regularly substituted on the route. The maximum speed of 160 km/h can be reached on long sections. The average speed is 84.5 km/h. Since the timetable change in December 2019, the Rhein-Weser-Express has been operated by National Express with Siemens Desiro HC EMUs.

The Rhein-Weser-Express is linked with the rest of the transport network in North Rhine-Westphalia and Lower Saxony in Cologne, Düsseldorf, Duisburg, Essen, Dortmund, Hamm, Bielefeld, Herford, Löhne and Minden.

== Tenders of the route ==
Four public transport associations are involved in the operation of the Rhein-Weser-Express: the Verkehrsverbund Rhein-Ruhr (transport association of the Rhine-Ruhr, VRR, the Verkehrsgemeinschaft Ruhr-Lippe (transport community of Westphalia-Lippe), Zweckverband SPNV Münsterland (regional rail transport association of Münsterland, ZVM) and Verkehrsverbund OstWestfalenLippe (transport association of East Westphalia-Lippe, VVOWL).

The "large traffic" contract (große Verkehrsvertrag) that covers the route between Dortmund and Düsseldorf was terminated by the VRR on 12 June 2008 without notice, since then DB has operated this branch under direction. On 19 December 2008 the Administrative Court of Gelsenkirchen ruled that the termination of the "large traffic" contract had been unlawful. The North Rhine-Westphalian authorities submitted a joint tendering schedule, according to which the RE 6 line was to be tendered together with the RE 5 Rhein-Express. Operation for the RE 6 was to commence on 11 December 2016.

Within the framework of the so-called "Rhein-Ruhr-Express" interim contract, services were provided by DB Regio from December 2016 until the start-up of the Rhine-Ruhr Express services. Since the timetable change in December 2019, the Rhein-Weser-Express has been operated by National Express with Desiro HC rolling stock.

== See also ==
- List of regional rail lines in North Rhine-Westphalia
- List of scheduled railway routes in Germany
