= Hamm–Minden railway =

Railway line in Germany

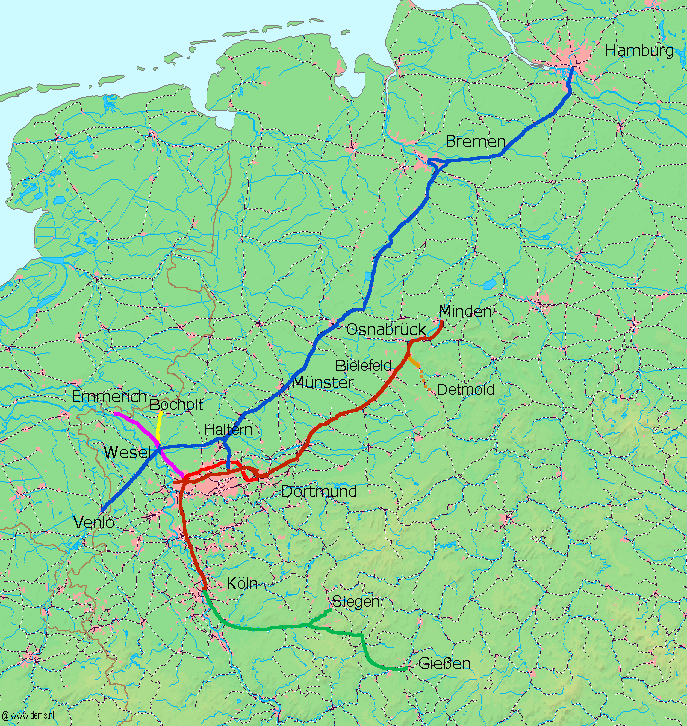
- Cologne-Minden trunk line in dark red

Overview
- Line number: 1700, 2990
- Locale: North Rhine-Westphalia, Germany

Service
- Route number: 400 (Hamm–Bielefeld); 370 (Bielefeld–Minden)

Technical
- Line length: 112 km (70 mi)
- Track gauge: 1,435 mm (4 ft 8 1/2 in) standard gauge
- Electrification: 15 kV/16.7 Hz AC overhead catenary
- Operating speed: 200 km/h (120 mph) (max); 120 km/h (75 mph) (max)

The Hamm–Minden Railway is an important and historically significant railway in Germany. It is completely quadruple track. It is a major axis for long distance passenger and freight trains between the Ruhr and the north and east of Germany. It is the part of the trunk line built by the Cologne-Minden Railway Company (German, old spelling: Cöln-Mindener Eisenbahn-Gesellschaft, CME) from Köln Deutz to Minden. It was opened in 1847 and has been modernized and developed several times since then.

== History ==
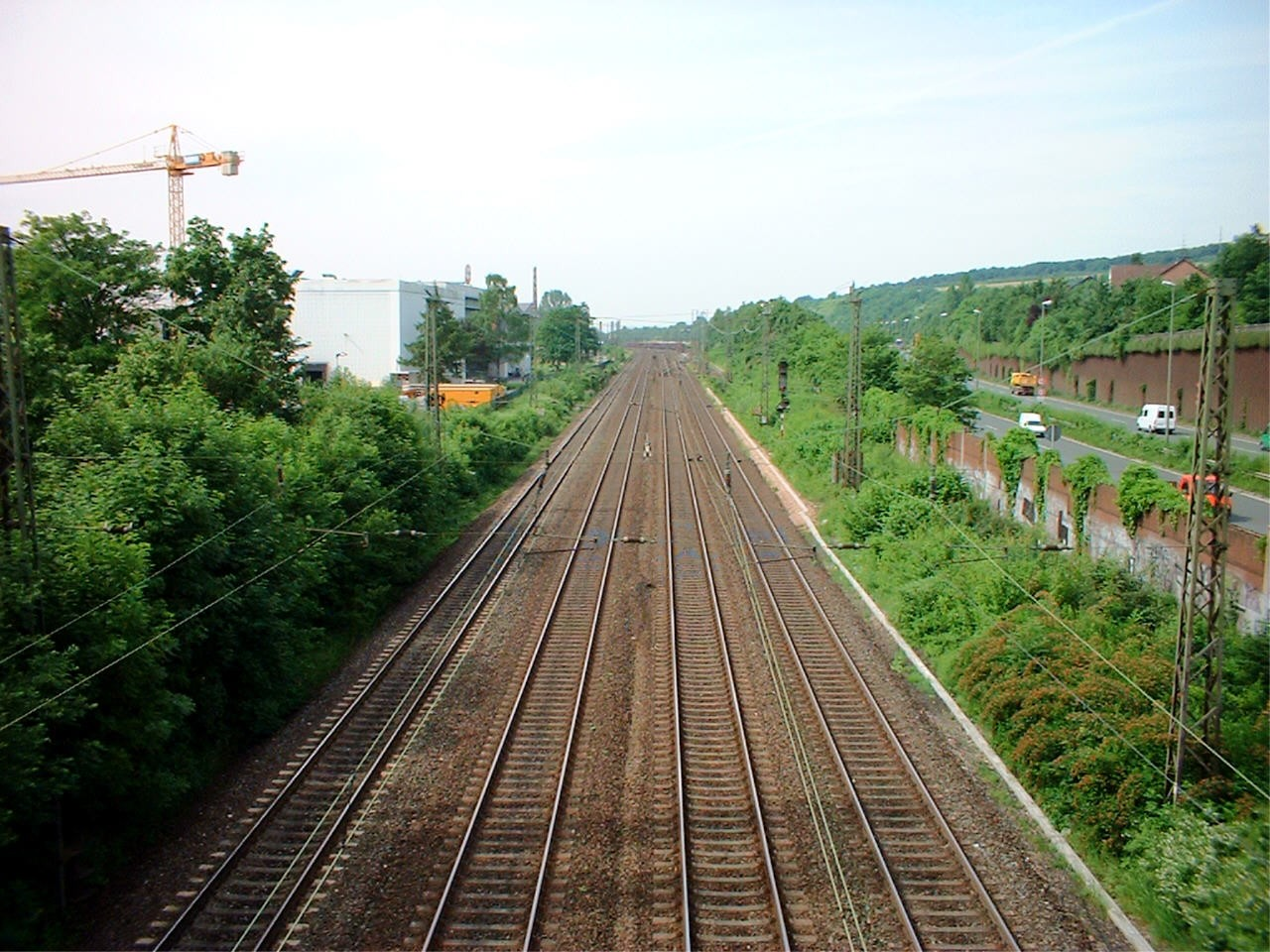
Trunk line in Bielefeld

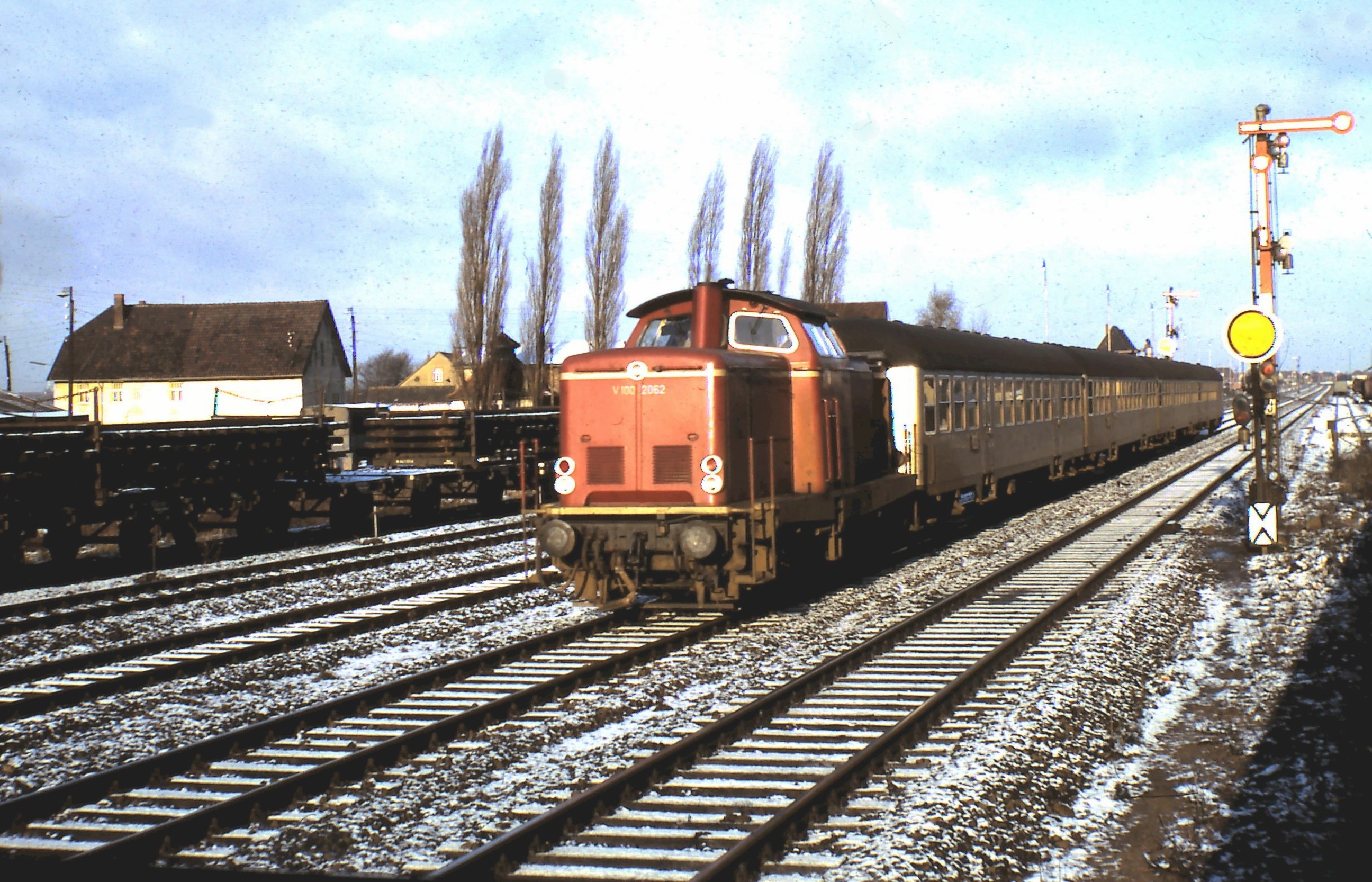
Line in Porta Westfalica in 1967 prior to the electrification

The route was opened on 15 October 1847 by the Cologne-Minden Railway Company (CME) as the last part of its trunk line, extending the line previously completed from Deutz (near Cologne) to Düsseldorf, Duisburg, Dortmund and Hamm. It connected with the Royal Hanoverian State Railways’ Hanover–Minden line, which was opened the same day. The CME's line was originally laid with two tracks, although some sections were put into operation before the second track was finished. Because of its importance for Prussia’s east–west transport and for international transport at the beginning of the 20th century, the line was made a four-track line. Many crossings were replaced with underpasses, and railway stations were rebuilt in order to provide space for the route.

Operationally, the line is run as two separate two track routes, the one having the VzG number 1700, being built and maintained for passenger services and allowing speeds up to 200 km/h, whilst the route with the VzG number of 2990 is used mainly for freight and has a maximum speed of 120 km/h. Between Ahlen until shortly east of Gütersloh route 2990 uses the two southernmost tracks, whilst 1700 comprise the northernmost pair; west of Ahlen and east of Gütersloh route 1700 uses the southernmost pair of tracks. The lines were electrified in the mid-1960s.

=== High-speed test track ===
The first Federal Transport Infrastructure Plan (1973) identified the Dortmund–Hannover–Brunswick line as one of eight railway development projects. Already in the same year a 28 km long section of track between Gütersloh and Neubeckum was made available for high-speed trials for speeds up to 250 km/h. Locomotive 103 118 with special gear ratios achieved a maximum speed of 252.9 km/h in September 1973. Vehicles were also built to test catenary for high-speed operations. The minimum curve radius was 3,300 metres and maximum cant was 120 mm. Experiments were carried out on different types of track (including slab track), catenary and turnouts.

=== Upgrading for high-speed ===
In 1980, it became one of the first lines in Germany upgraded for high speeds lines when a 58.0 kilometre long section between Hamm and Brackwede (near Bielefeld) was upgraded for scheduled services at 200 km/h.

In mid-1985, a test train hauled by locomotive103 003 with special gear ratios between Brackwede and Neubeckum reached a speed of 283 km/h, a rail speed record in Germany. On 26 November 1985, at 11:29, an InterCityExperimental train fully occupied with passengers on the line between Gutersloh and Hamm reached a speed of 317 km/h. This was a new German record for rail vehicles and a world record for rail vehicles using three-phase power.

== Bridges ==
=== Schildesche viaduct ===
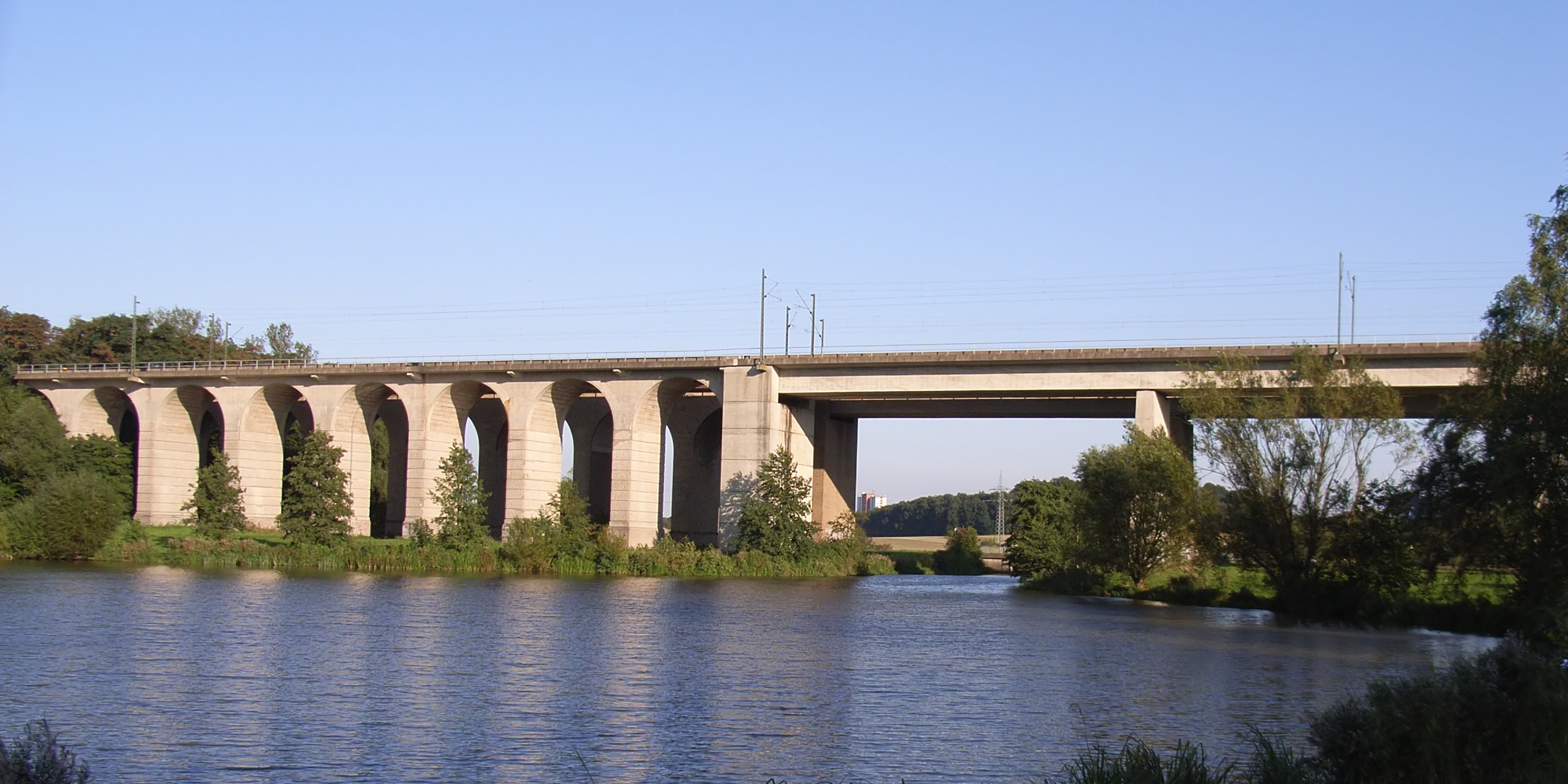
Schildesche Viaduct

A remarkable bridge on the trunk line is the viaduct in the Bielefeld suburb of Schildesche. The original viaduct as completed in 1847 was double track with 28 spans, and in 1917 a largely identical viaduct was built next to it. During World War II it was badly damaged on 14 March 1945 by a Grand Slam bomb dropped by an Avro Lancaster of No. 617 Squadron RAF, after 54 attacks using smaller bombs failed to destroy it. After the war, one line was reopened with a temporary steel strut for freight traffic, while passenger trains used a winding bypass built as a diversionary route prior to the bombing, known as the "rubber railway". In 1965 the viaduct was reopened, the two-track viaduct for the “passenger route” having been repaired with concrete spans replacing the destroyed masonry spans, and the other using a provisional steel-frame construction built from old Wehrmacht pioneer materials. In 1983, the “freight route” viaduct was fully repaired, featuring the same concrete architecture used for the passenger route’s bridge.

=== Weser bridge ===
The Weser bridge in Rehme (Bad Oeynhausen) suburb was destroyed by an air raid on 23 March 1945. The bridge was rebuilt after the war with only two tracks, creating a two-track bottleneck between Bad Oeynhausen station and the Neesen yard (in Porta Westfalica). This situation ended only with the construction of a new Weser bridge in December 1984.

== Services ==
There is an hourly Intercity-Express trains service on line 10 from Berlin, via Hannover to Hamm, where trains are split (or are combined, in the reverse direction). Services continue to Dortmund, Essen, Duisburg, Köln Messe/Deutz and Cologne/Bonn Airport or Hagen, Wuppertal and Cologne (some continue to Koblenz and Trier). Other InterCity and ICE trains also run. Regional-Express trains run on line RE6 (Rhein-Weser-Express, Minden–Cologne/Bonn Airport) every hour and other services operate on sections of the route.
