= Meerbusch-Osterath station =

Railway station in Germany

Meerbusch-Osterath
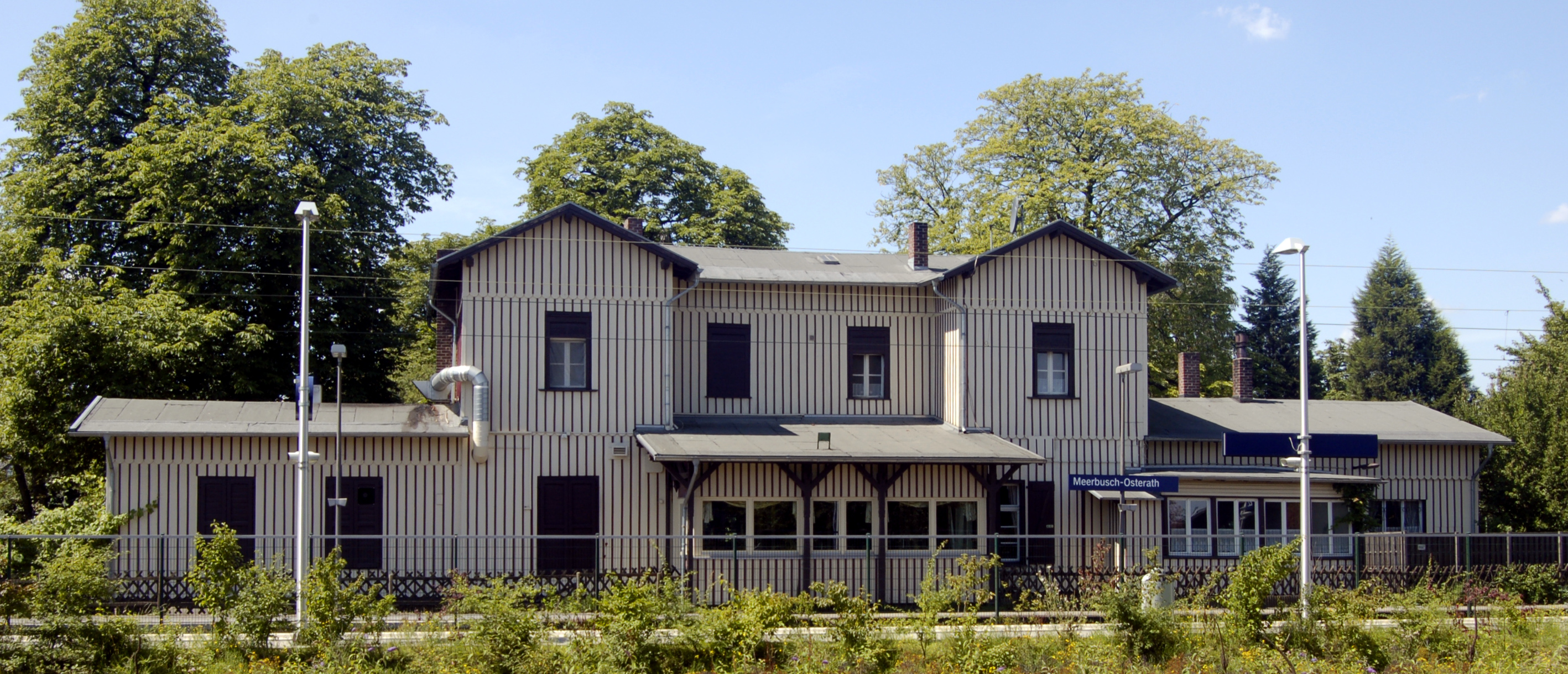
- Former entrance building, platforms in the foreground

General information
- Location: Bahnhofsweg 31, Osterath, Meerbusch, NRW; Germany
- Coordinates: 51°16′08″N 6°37′33″E
- Lines: Lower Left Rhine Railway (km 43.2); Osterath–Dortmund Süd (km 43.2)
- Platforms: 2

Construction
- Accessible: Yes

Other information
- Station code: 4023
- DS100 code: KMBO
- IBNR: 8004694
- Category: 5
- Fare zone: VRR: 422
- Website: www.bahnhof.de

History
- Opened: 26 January 1856
- Former names: Meerbusch (until 1980)

Services
Preceding station	National Express Germany	Following station
Krefeld-Oppum towards Krefeld Hbf	RE 7 (Rhein-Münsterland-Express)	Neuss Hbf towards Rheine
Preceding station	NordWestBahn	Following station
Krefeld-Oppum towards Kleve	RE 10	Düsseldorf Hbf Terminus
Location

Meerbusch-Osterath is the only station in Meerbusch in the German state of North Rhine-Westphalia. It is located in the district of Osterath and lies at the Lower Left Rhine Railway (Linksniederrheinische Strecke) and on the Osterath–Dortmund Süd railway.

== History ==
Meerbusch-Osterath station was opened on 26 January 1856 on the Lower Left Rhine Railway as Osterath station. From 1866, it was also the starting point of the Osterath–Dortmund Süd railway. In 1980, it was renamed Meerbusch-Osterath as a result of the foundation of the city of Meerbusch.

== Accidents and incidents ==
On 5 December 2017, a passenger train ran into the rear of a freight train near Meerbusch. Forty-seven people were injured.

== Location and structure ==
The station is located on the eastern edge of Osterath on the road connecting Meerbusch and Willich. The entrance building Is now used as a restaurant.

== Services ==
Osterath is served by two Regional-Express services. The RE 7 connects with Krefeld, Neuss and Cologne and the RE 10 with Kleve, Krefeld and Düsseldorf.

Line	Route	Interval	Railway
RE 7	Rhein-Münsterland-Express: Rheine – Emsdetten – Greven – Münster Hbf – Münster-Hiltrup – Drensteinfurt – Hamm (Westf) – Bönen – Unna – Holzwickede – Schwerte – Hagen Hbf – Ennepetal (Gevelsberg) – Schwelm – Wuppertal-Oberbarmen – Wuppertal Hbf – Solingen Hbf – Opladen – Köln Messe/Deutz – Cologne Hbf – Dormagen – Neuss Hbf – Meerbusch-Osterath – Krefeld-Oppum – Krefeld Hbf; Status: December 2015 timetable	60 min	Lower Left Rhine Railway
RE 10	Niers-Express: Kleve – Bedburg-Hau – Goch – Weeze – Kevelaer – Geldern – Nieukerk – Aldekerk – Kempen (Niederrhein) – Krefeld Hbf – Krefeld-Oppum – Meerbusch-Osterath – Düsseldorf Hbf; Status: December 2015 timetable	30 min	Lower Left Rhine Railway

=== Bus services ===
The station is accessible by bus at the Osterath Bf. and the Osterath, Bahnhofsweg stops. These two bus stops are served by two bus routes, 071 and 832. Route 071 is a regional route and connects the station with Viersen and Willich in the west and with Haus Meer U-Bahn station in the east, where there is a connection to the Düsseldorf Stadtbahn line U76. Route 832 is a local route and connects the station with Meerbusch-Strümp and Meerbusch-Lank-Latum.

Line	Route
071	Meerbusch Haus Meer – Osterath, Bahnhofsweg – Willich-Anrath Kirche – Viersen ZOB
832	Osterath, Viersener Straße ← Osterath Bf – Osterath, Bahnhofsweg – Hoterheide – Strümp – Lank, Kirche
