= Munster station =

Munster station or Münster station may refer to:

== Germany ==
- Münster Hauptbahnhof, the main railway station in Münster
- Münster-Hiltrup station
- Münster-Sprakel station
- Münster-Zentrum Nord station

== United States ==
- Munster Ridge station
- Munster/Dyer station
