= Reckenfeld station =

Railway station in Greven, Germany

Reckenfeld
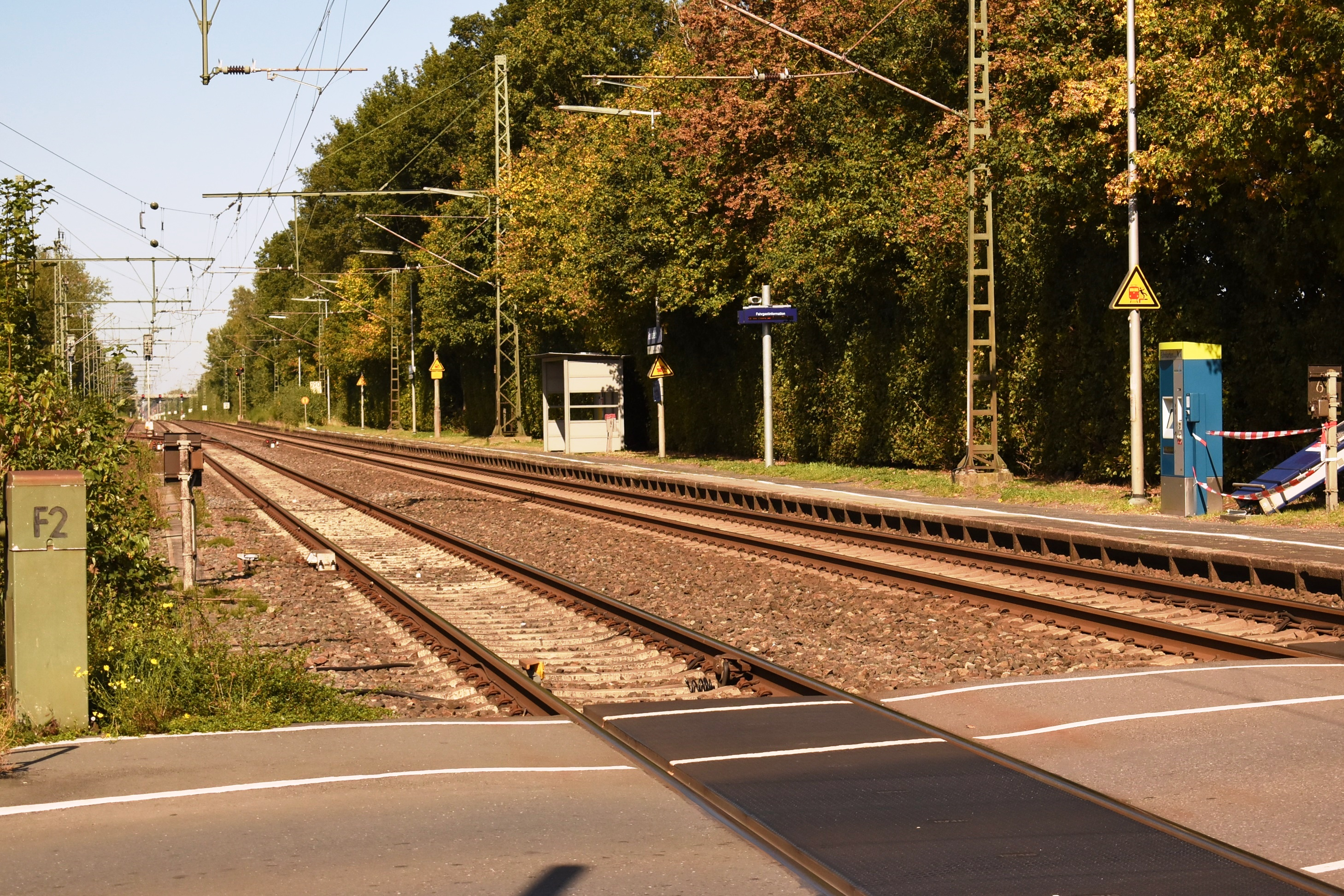
- Reckenfeld station

General information
- Location: Bahnhofstr. 67, Greven-Reckenfeld, NRW; Germany
- Coordinates: 52°08′02″N 7°33′54″E
- Line: Münster–Rheine railway
- Platforms: 1

Construction
- Accessible: Yes

Other information
- Station code: 5159
- DS100 code: ERFE
- IBNR: 8004972
- Category: 5
- Website: www.bahnhof.de

History
- Opened: 1918
- Former names: Hembergen

Services
Preceding station		Following station
Emsdetten towards Rheine	RB 65	Greven towards Münster Hbf
Location
- Location within North Rhine-Westphalia

Reckenfeld is a railway station located in Reckenfeld, Greven, Germany.

== History ==
The station is located on the Münster–Rheine line. The train services are operated by Eurobahn.

== Rail services ==
The following service currently call at Reckenfeld:

Series	Train Type	Route	Frequency
RB 65	Eurobahn	Rheine - Rheine-Mesum - Emsdetten - Reckenfeld - Greven - Münster-Sprakel - Münster-Zentrum Nord – Münster Hbf	Hourly, about every 30 mins in peak
