= Münster-Zentrum Nord station =

Railway station in Münster, Germany

Münster Zentrum Nord
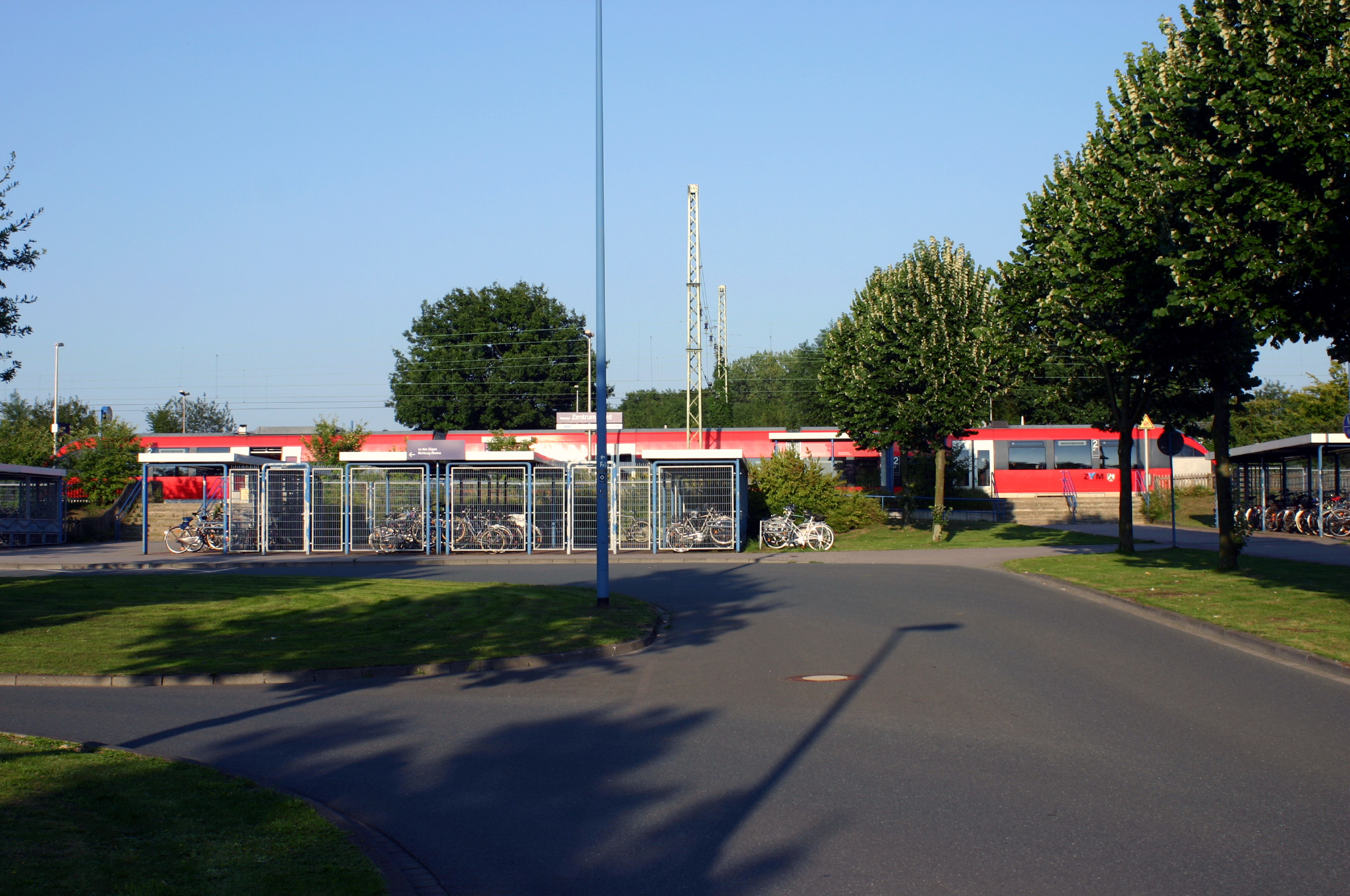

General information
- Location: Münster, NRW; Germany
- Coordinates: 51°59′03″N 7°38′19″E
- Lines: Münster–Enschede (KBS 407); Dorsten–Rheine (KBS 410)
- Platforms: 2

Construction
- Accessible: Yes

Other information
- Station code: 7655
- DS100 code: ENHF
- Category: 5
- Fare zone: Westfalentarif: 55027
- Website: www.bahnhof.de

History
- Opened: 28 May 1995

Services
Preceding station	DB Regio NRW	Following station
Terminus	RB 63	Münster Hbf towards Coesfeld
Münster-Häger towards Enschede	RB 64	Münster Hbf Terminus
Preceding station		Following station
Münster-Sprakel towards Münster Hbf	RB 65	Münster Hbf Terminus
Location

Münster Zentrum Nord is a railway station located in Münster, Germany.

== History ==
The station is located on the Münster–Rheine line and the Münster–Enschede railway. The train services are operated by Deutsche Bahn and the Westfalenbahn.

== Train services ==
The following services currently call at Münster Zentrum Nord:

Series	Route	Frequency
RB 63	Münster-Zentum Nord - Münster Hbf - Havixbeck- Billerbeck - Coesfeld	Hourly
RB 64	Enschede - Enschede De Eschmarke - Glanerbrug - Gronau - Ochtrup - Metelen Land - Burgsteinfurt - Borghorst - Nordwalde - Altenberge - Münster-Häger - Münster-Zentrum Nord - Münster Hbf	Hourly
RB 65	Rheine - Rheine-Mesum - Emsdetten - Reckenfeld - Greven - Münster-Sprakel - Münster-Zentrum Nord – Münster Hbf	Hourly

The station is located in the area of the fare association Westfalen-Tarif
