= Rheine-Mesum station =

Railway station in Rheine, Germany

Rheine-Mesum

General information
- Location: Industriestr. 22, Rheine-Mesum, North Rhine-Westphalia; Germany
- Coordinates: 52°13′25″N 7°29′07″E
- System: Through station
- Line: Münster–Rheine railway
- Platforms: 1

Other information
- Station code: 4080
- DS100 code: HMSU
- IBNR: 8004000
- Category: 6
- Website: www.bahnhof.de

History
- Opened: 23 June 1856
- Former names: Mesum

Services
| Preceding station | | Following station |
|---|---|---|
| Rheine Terminus | RB 65 | Emsdetten towards Münster Hbf |
Location
- Location within North Rhine-Westphalia

Rheine-Mesum is a railway station located in Mesum, Germany.

== History ==
The station is located on the Münster–Rheine line. The train services are operated by WestfalenBahn.

== Rail services ==
The following service currently call at Rheine-Mesum:

| Series | Operator | Route | Frequency |
|---|---|---|---|
| RB 65 | WestfalenBahn | Rheine – Rheine-Mesum – Emsdetten – Reckenfeld – Greven – Münster-Sprakel – Münster-Zentrum Nord – Münster Hbf | Hourly, about every 30 mins in peak |
