= Greven station =

Railway station in Greven, Germany

Greven
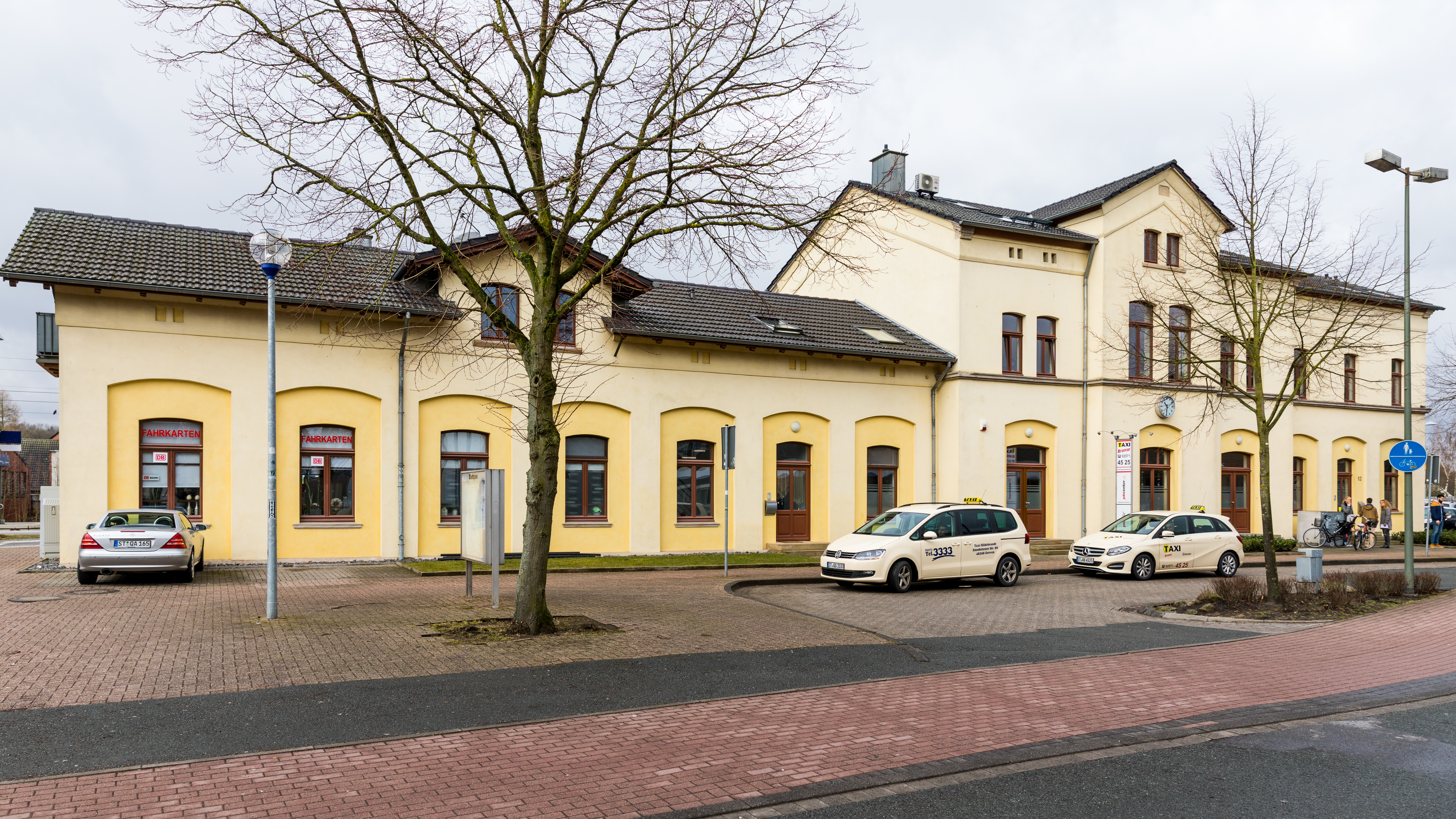
- Greven station

General information
- Location: Biederlackstr. 6, Greven, NRW; Germany
- Coordinates: 52°05′23″N 7°35′58″E
- Line: Münster–Rheine railway
- Platforms: 1

Construction
- Accessible: Yes

Other information
- Station code: 2262
- DS100 code: EGRV
- IBNR: 8002369
- Category: 3
- Website: www.bahnhof.de

History
- Opened: 1856

Services
Preceding station	National Express Germany	Following station
Emsdetten towards Rheine	RE 7 (Rhein-Münsterland-Express)	Münster Hbf towards Krefeld Hbf
Preceding station		Following station
Emsdetten towards Emden Hbf	RE 15	Münster Hbf Terminus
Preceding station		Following station
Reckenfeld towards Rheine	RB 65	Münster-Sprakel towards Münster Hbf
Location
- Location within North Rhine-Westphalia

Greven is a railway station located in Greven, Germany. The station is located on the Münster–Rheine line. The train services are operated by Deutsche Bahn and the WestfalenBahn. The station is 10 minutes walk from the centre of Greven.

== Train services ==
The following services currently call at Greven:

Series	Route	Frequency
RE 7	Münster Hbf – Greven – Emsdetten – Rheine – Salzbergen – Leschede – Lingen (Ems) – Geeste – Meppen – Haren (Ems) – Lathen – Dörpen –Aschendorf – Papenburg – Leer – Emden Hbf	Hourly
RE 15	Münster – Greven – Rheine – Lingen – Leer – Emden – Emden Außenhafen	Hourly
RB 65	Rheine – Rheine-Mesum – Emsdetten – Reckenfeld – Greven – Münster-Sprakel – Münster-Zentrum Nord – Münster Hbf	Hourly
