= Münster-Sprakel station =

Railway station in Münster, Germany

Münster Sprakel

General information
- Location: Sprakelerstr. 3, Münster-Sprakel, NRW; Germany
- Coordinates: 52°02′29″N 7°37′12″E
- Line: Münster–Rheine railway
- Platforms: 1

Construction
- Accessible: Yes

Other information
- Station code: 5928
- DS100 code: ESPR
- IBNR: 8005635
- Category: 5
- Website: www.bahnhof.de

History
- Opened: 1856

Services
Preceding station		Following station
Greven towards Rheine	RB 65	Münster Hbf Terminus
Location
- Location within North Rhine-Westphalia

Münster-Sprakel is a railway station located in Sprakel near Münster, Germany.

== History ==
The station is located on the Münster–Rheine line. The train services are operated by Eurobahn.

== Train services ==
The following services currently call at Münster-Sprakel:

Series	Operator	Route	Frequency
RB 65	Eurobahn	Rheine – Rheine-Mesum – Emsdetten – Reckenfeld – Greven – Münster-Sprakel – Münster-Zentrum Nord – Münster Hbf	Hourly
