= Isselhorst-Avenwedde station =

Railway station in Germany

Isselhorst-Avenwedde
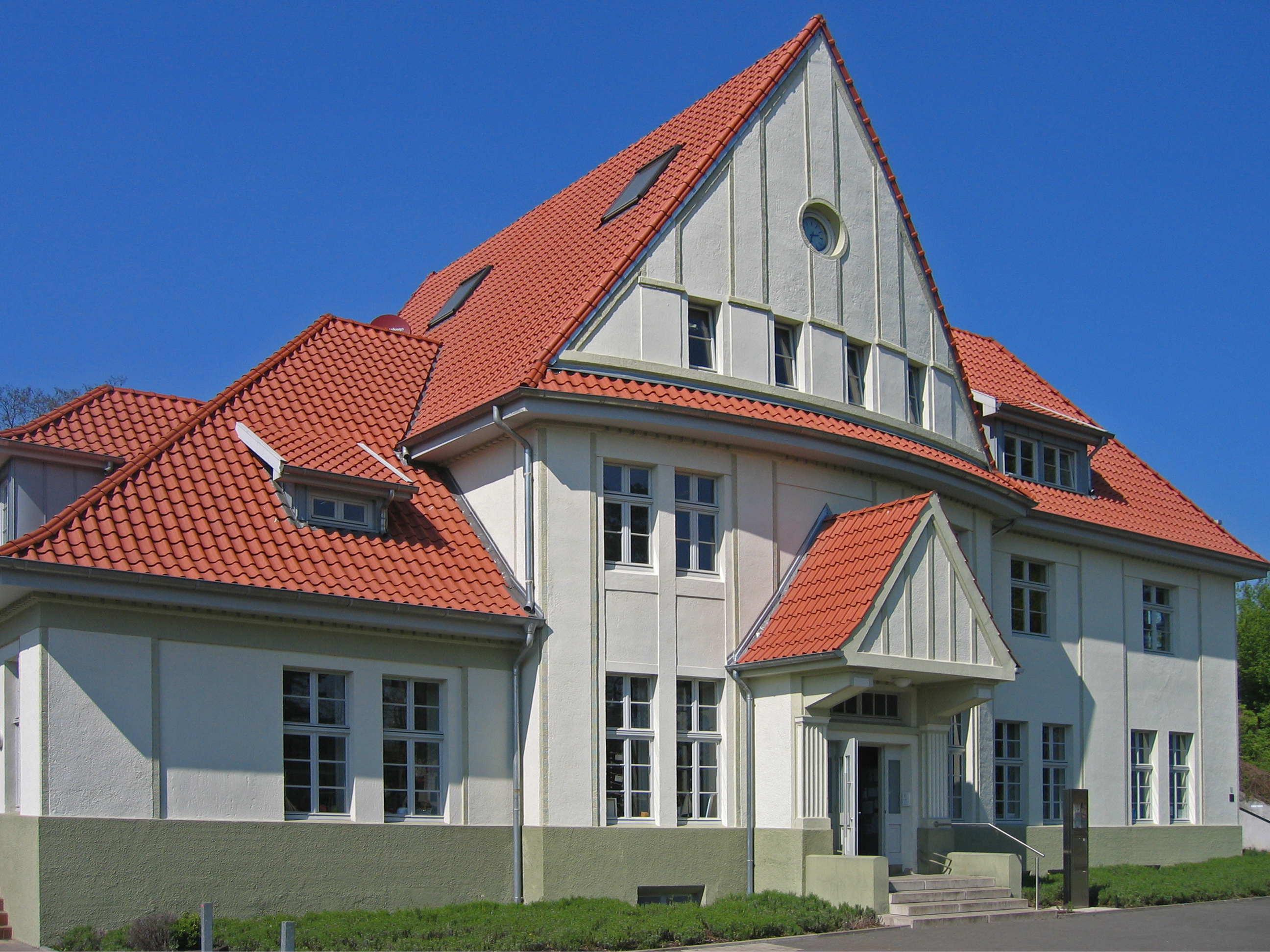
- 2009

General information
- Location: Isselhorsterstraße 248; 33335 Gütersloh; North Rhine-Westphalia; Germany
- Coordinates: 51°56′25″N 8°26′21″E
- Owner: DB Netz
- Operator: DB Station&Service
- Line: Hamm–Minden railway
- Platforms: 2 side platforms
- Tracks: 4
- Train operators: eurobahn

Other information
- Station code: 3012
- DS100 code: EIAV
- IBNR: 8003096
- Category: 6
- Fare zone: Westfalentarif: 60531
- Website: www.bahnhof.de

History
- Opened: 1880/97

Services
| Preceding station | | Following station |
|---|---|---|
| Gütersloh Hbf towards Münster Hbf | RB 69 | Brackwede towards Bielefeld Hbf |
Location
- Location within North Rhine-Westphalia

Isselhorst-Avenwedde station is a railway station in the Isselhorst-Avenwedde district of the town of Gütersloh, located in North Rhine-Westphalia, Germany.

== Rail services ==
| Line | Name | Route |
|---|---|---|
| RB 69 | Ems-Börde-Bahn | Münster Hauptbahnhof – Hamm Hauptbahnhof – Gütersloh Hauptbahnhof – Isselhorst-Avenwedde – Bielefeld Hauptbahnhof |
