= Kerstin Stegemann =

German footballer (born 1977)

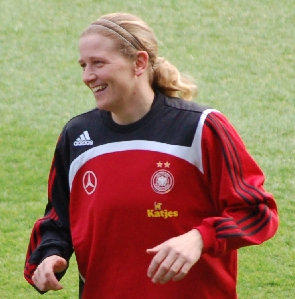
- Stegemann in 2008

Personal information
- Full name: Kerstin Stegemann
- Date of birth: 29 September 1977 (age 49)
- Place of birth: Mesum, Rheine, West Germany
- Height: 1.71 m (5 ft 7 in)
- Positions: Defender; midfielder

Youth career
- SV Germania Hauenhorst

Senior career*
Years	Team	Apps	(Gls)
1993–1998	FFC Heike Rheine		
1998–2000	FCR 2001 Duisburg		
2000–2001	FFC Flaesheim-Hillen		
2001–2007	FFC Heike Rheine		
2007–2008	SG Wattenscheid 09		
2008–2009	Herforder SV		
2009–2010	FSV Gütersloh		

International career
1995–2009	Germany	191	(8)
Medal record
Women's football
Representing Germany
FIFA Women's World Cup
Gold medal – first place	2003 United States	Team
Gold medal – first place	2007 China	Team
Olympic Games
Bronze medal – third place	2000 Sydney	Team
Bronze medal – third place	2004 Athens	Team
Bronze medal – third place	2008 Beijing	Team
UEFA Women's Championship
Gold medal – first place	1997 Norway/Sweden	Team
Gold medal – first place	2001 Germany	Team
Gold medal – first place	2005 England	Team
Gold medal – first place	2009 Finland	Team
- * Club domestic league appearances and goals

Kerstin Stegemann (born 29 September 1977) is a German former footballer who played as a defender or midfielder.

== Career ==
Born in Rheine-Mesum, she made her football debut at age 15 in 1993, playing for FFC Heike Rheine in the Frauen-Bundesliga. Within two years, she made her first appearance for the Germany national team, playing in a 13 April 1995 match against Poland. She went on to become a mainstay of the national team, playing on Germany's bronze medal-winning squads in the 2000 and 2004 Summer Olympics, as well as their 2003 Women's World Cup championship team.

Along with Birgit Prinz and Bettina Wiegmann, she is one of only three German women with more than 150 caps, having reached that mark in a 23 November 2006 match against Japan. She also holds a team record with 61 consecutive international matches played.

Stegemann retired in 2009 with 191 international appearances and eight goals to her credit.

== Style of play ==
A right-back, Stegemann has been cited as one of the first overlapping full-backs in women’s football.

== Honours ==
Germany

- FIFA Women's World Cup: 2003, 2007
- Football at the Summer Olympics: bronze medal 2000, 2004, 2008
- UEFA Women's Championship: 1997, 2001, 2005, 2009

Individual

- FIFA Women's World Cup All Star Team: 2007

== International goals ==
Scores and results list Germany's goal tally first.

No.	Date	Venue	Opponent	Score	Opponent	Competition
5.	20 October 2005	Bayreuth, Germany	Scotland	2–0	4–0	2007 FIFA Women's World Cup qualification
6.	10 May 2007	Haverfordwest, Wales	Wales	3–0	6–0	UEFA Women's Euro 2009 qualifying
7.	26 September 2007	Tianjin, China	Norway	2–0	3–0	2007 FIFA Women's World Cup
8.	9 August 2008	Shenyang, China	Nigeria	1–0	1–0	2008 Summer Olympics
