= Meerbusch train crash =

2017 train crash in Meerbusch, Germany

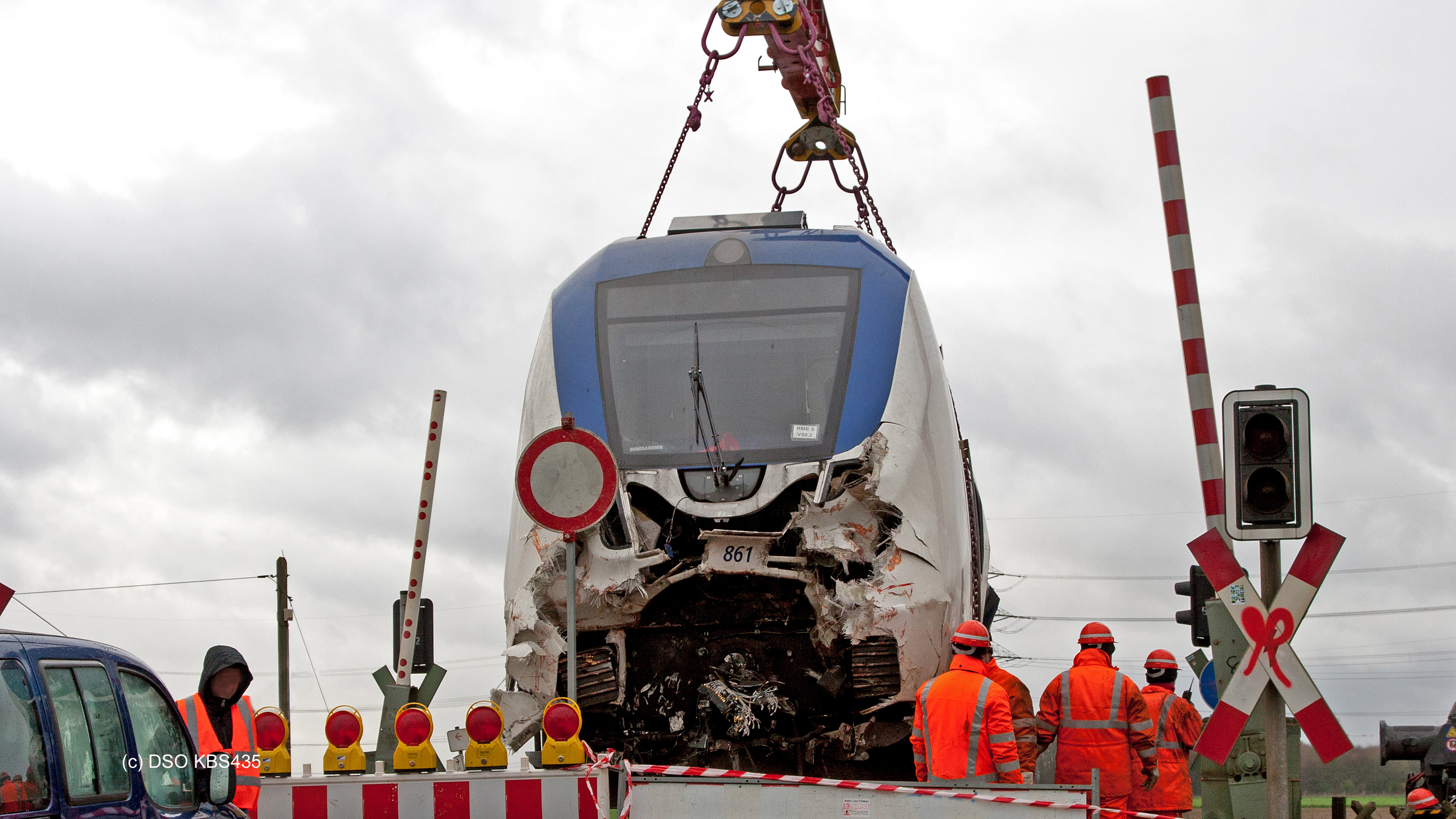
- The wrecked passenger train at train accident site near Meerbusch on 8 Dec 2017

Details
- Date: 5 December 2017; 19:30 CET (18:30 UTC)
- Location: Meerbusch, North Rhine-Westphalia
- Country: Germany
- Line: Krefeld - Neuss line
- Operator: DB Cargo; National Express Germany
- Incident type: Rear-end collision
- Cause: Under investigation

Statistics
- Trains: 2
- Passengers: 155
- Injured: 50

The Meerbusch train crash occurred on 5 December 2017 when a passenger train ran into the rear of a freight train near Meerbusch, North Rhine-Westphalia, Germany. Fifty people were injured, nine seriously.

== Accident ==
At about 19:30 CET (18:30 UTC), a passenger train operated by National Express Germany ran into the rear of a freight train operated by DB Cargo near Meerbusch-Osterath station, North Rhine-Westphalia, Germany. The driver of the passenger train was able to give a warning before the collision occurred. Fifty people were injured, nine seriously and three with moderate injuries. The train was carrying 155 passengers. The passenger train was travelling from Krefeld to Neuss. The freight train was travelling from Dillingen, Saarland to Rotterdam, South Holland, Netherlands. The rear three wagons of the freight train were derailed. The leading carriage of the Bombardier Talent 2 electric multiple unit which formed the passenger train was severely damaged. The rescue of passengers was hampered by fallen power cables, which were made safe by Deutsche Bahn. More than 200 firefighters assisted in the rescue efforts. The line between Düsseldorf and Krefeld was closed.

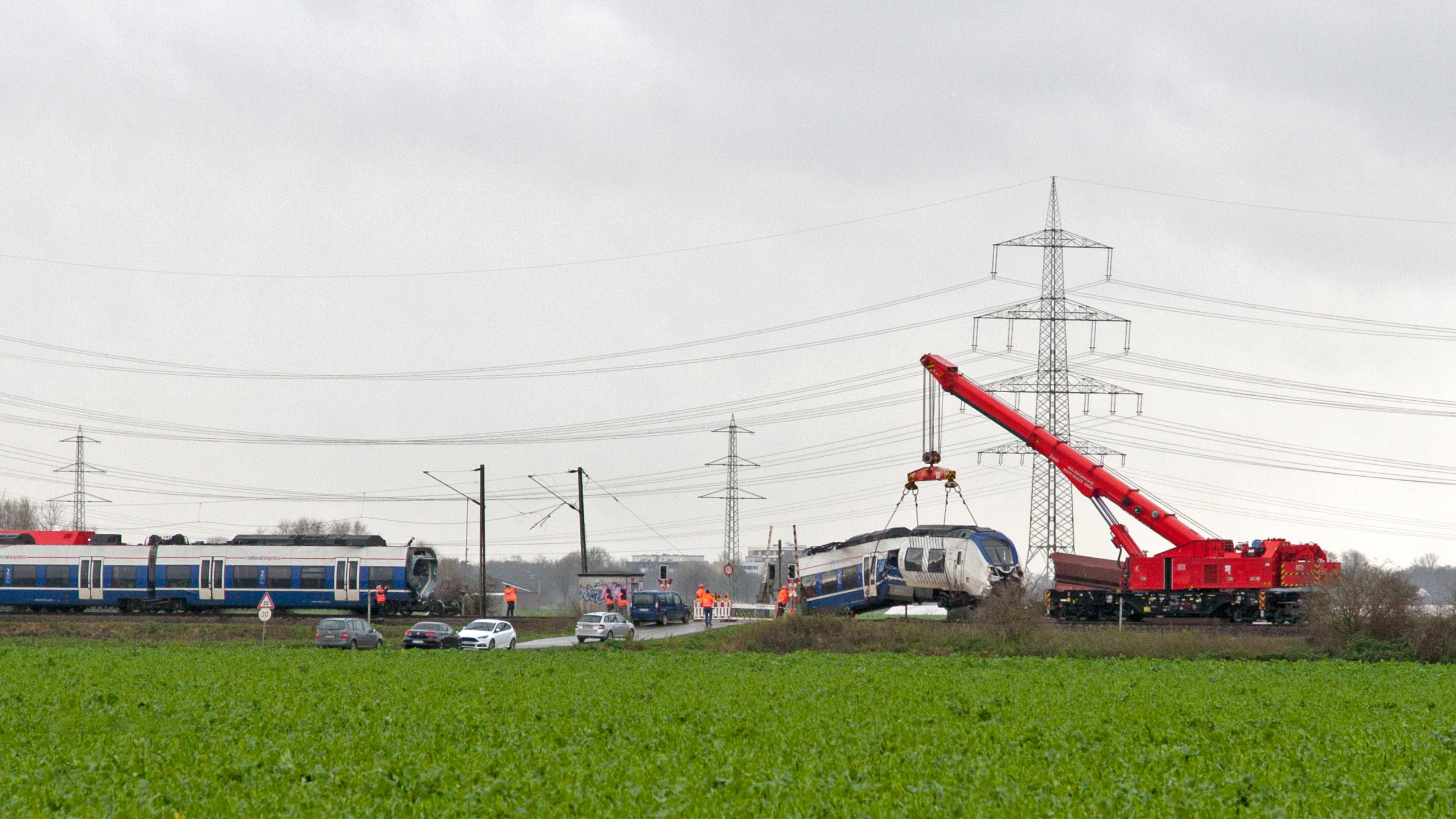
Cleanup of the accident aftermath

== Investigation ==
The Eisenbahn-Unfalluntersuchungsstelle des Bundes (EUB) opened an investigation into the accident. It was reported that the passenger train may have incorrectly been given permission to pass a signal indicating “stop”.
