= Ibbenbüren-Esch station =

Railway station in Ibbenbüren, Germany

Ibbenbüren-Esch
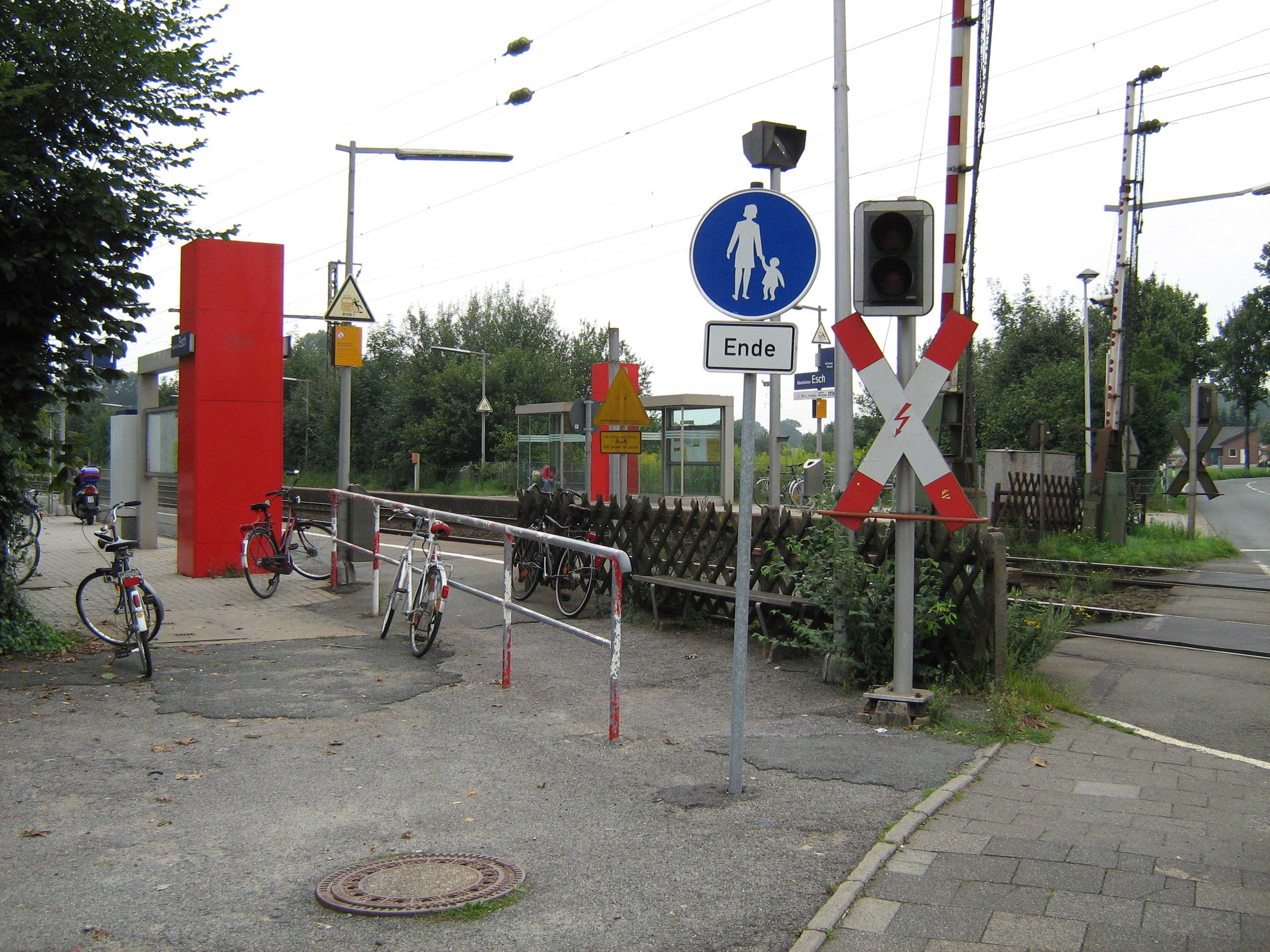
- Ibbenbüren-Esch railway station

General information
- Location: Püsselbüren, North Rhine-Westphalia; Germany
- Coordinates: 52°17′59″N 7°39′23″E
- System: Through station
- Line: Löhne–Rheine railway
- Platforms: 2

Other information
- Station code: n/a
- Category: 5
- Fare zone: Westfalentarif: 51037
- Website: www.bahnhof.de

History
- Opened: 1889

Services
Preceding station		Following station
Hörstel towards Rheine	RE 60	Ibbenbüren towards Braunschweig Hbf
Preceding station		Following station
Hörstel towards Hengelo	RB 61	Ibbenbüren towards Bielefeld Hbf
Location

Ibbenbüren-Esch (German: Bahnhof Ibbenbüren-Esch) is a railway station located in Püsselbüren, a village of Ibbenbüren, Germany. The station was opened on 1 August 1889 is located on the Löhne–Rheine line. The train services are operated by WestfalenBahn. Until 2004 the station was known as Esch (Westf).

== Train services ==
The station is served by the following service(s):

- Regional services RE 60 Rheine - Osnabrück - Minden - Hanover - Braunschweig
- Regional services RB 61 Bad Bentheim - Rheine - Osnabrück - Herford - Bielefeld

== Gallery ==
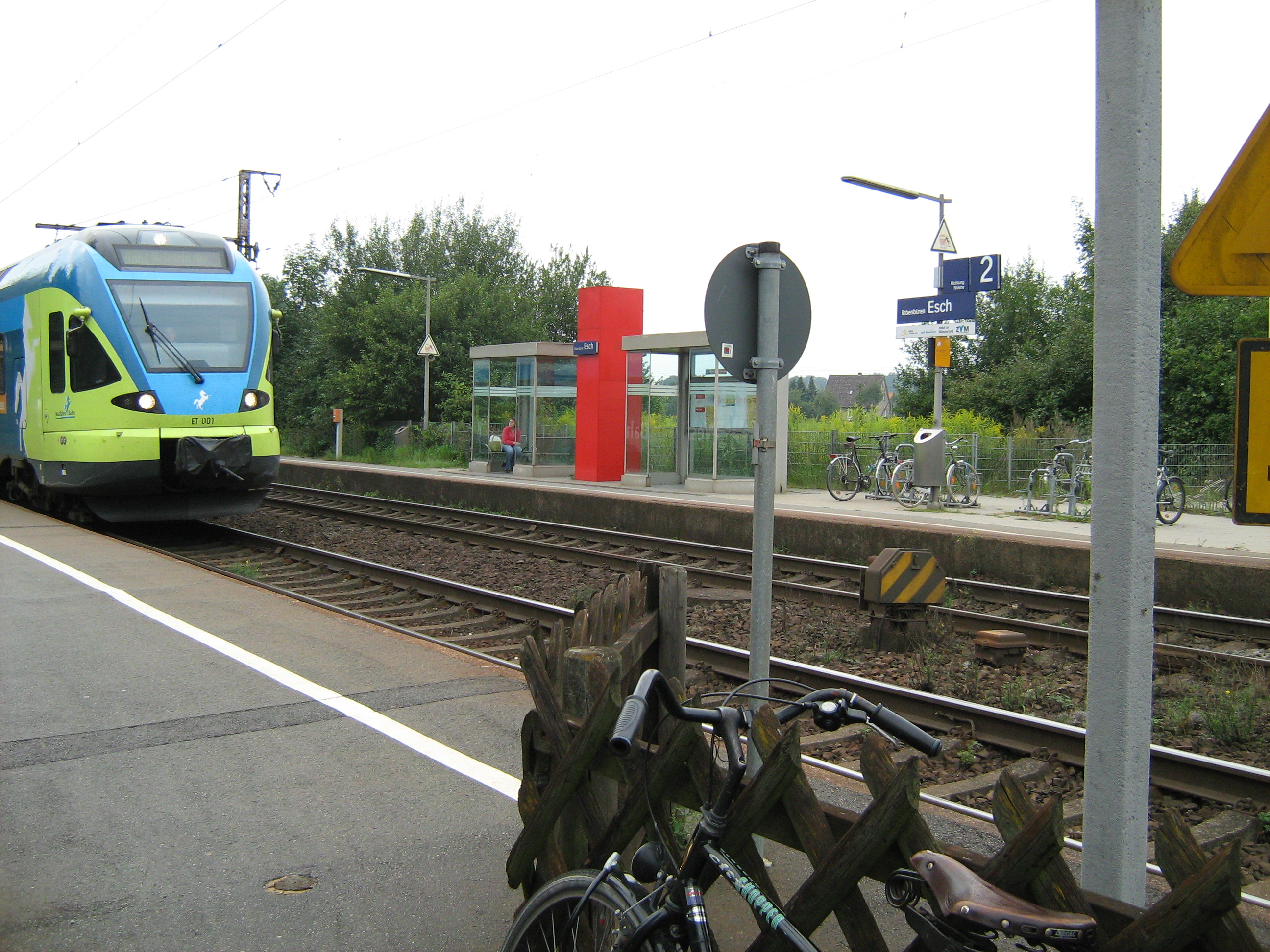
A Westfalenbahn train at the station.

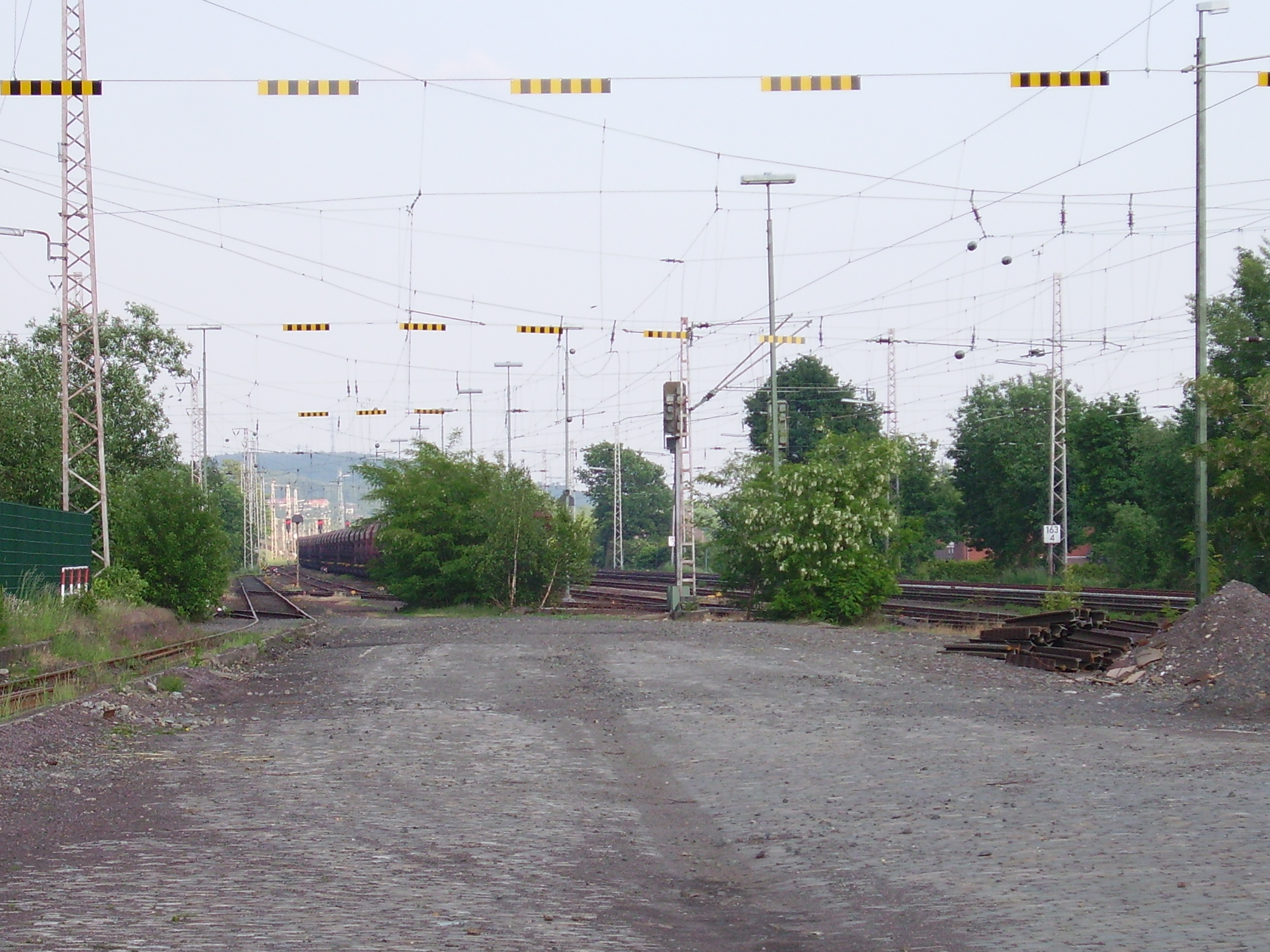
The goods yards of Esch.

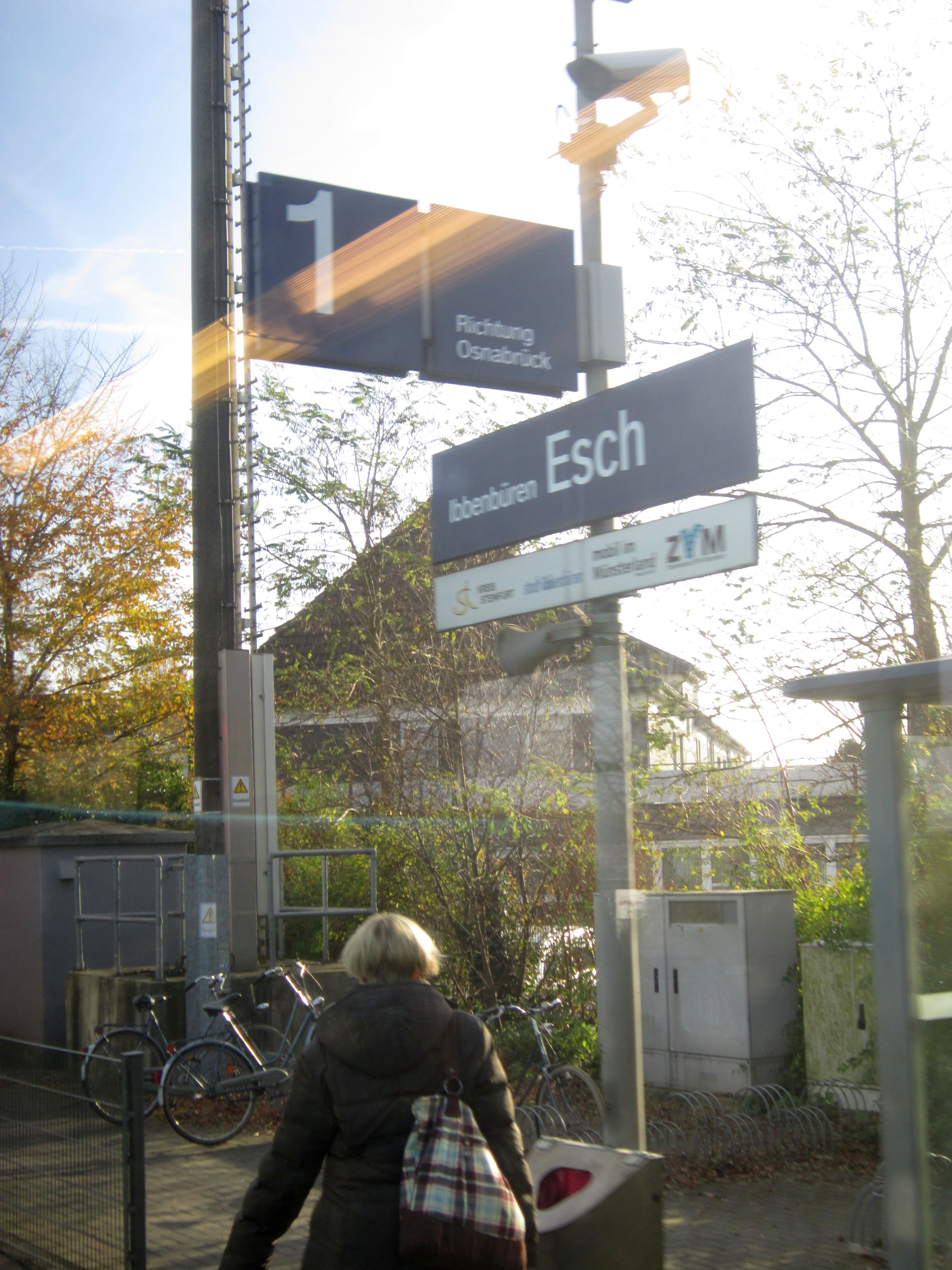
Ibbenbüren-Esch station sign
