= Münster freight bypass railway =

Münster freight bypass railway Güterumgehungsbahn Münster
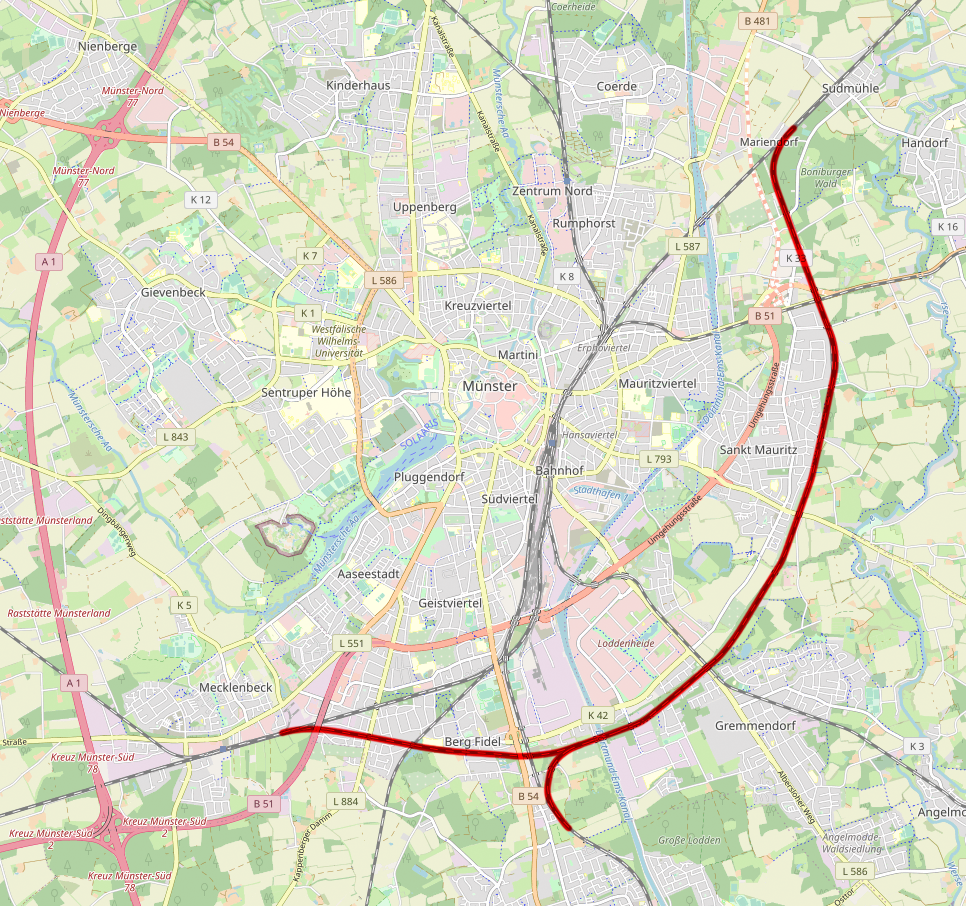

Overview
- Line number: 2010 (Sudmühle–Mecklenbeck); 2011 (Kanal–Lechtenberg)
- Locale: North Rhine-Westphalia, Germany

Technical
- Line length: 13 km (8.1 mi)
- Track gauge: 1,435 mm (4 ft 8 1/2 in) standard gauge
- Electrification: 15 kV/16.7 Hz AC overhead catenary
- Operating speed: 80 km/h (50 mph)

The Münster freight bypass railway (German: Güterumgehungsbahn Münster) is an electrified and mostly single track bypass railway in Münster in the German state of North Rhine-Westphalia. It is only regularly used by freight to avoid Münster Hauptbahnhof.

== History ==
The bypass was opened on 5 October 1930 and is the most recent major railway construction project in Münster. The reason for its construction was that after the First World War there was a great increase freight traffic on the line while Münster Hauptbahnhof had no through tracks dedicated to freight and such tracks could not be built due to lack of space.

Originally, the plan was also to build a two-sided marshalling yard (approximately in the area between the Dortmund–Ems Canal and Kaldenhofer Weg), which would be connected via the bypass to all major routes to Münster. However, this was not implemented for cost reasons.

Electrification of the line was completed on 25 May 1968.

The bypass is proposed to be closed under the Netz (network) 21 project, which would relocate freight traffic on the routes between the North Sea ports and the Ruhr to other lines via Minden, but, because some of the required upgrades have still not been completed, it is still open.

== Route ==
The bypass begins at Bbf (Betriebsbahnhof, “operations” station, which mainly consists of passing loops) Mecklenbeck on the Wanne-Eickel–Münster line. It runs east around the city and ends at Bbf Sudmühle on the Münster–Osnabrück line. In addition, there is also possible to connect to Lechtenberg junction on the Münster–Hamm railway to run over the bypass towards Sudmühle (or vice versa).

Most of the line is built as single track. Only the connection curve to the Hamm line and the section from Pleister crossover to Bbf Sudmühle are duplicated. It has three tracks at Bbf Kanal. The track is built mainly on an embankment and has no level crossings. The Bbf Mecklenbeck–Bbf Kanal section it partially built in a cutting. Along the way there are many bridges, the largest of which crosses the Dortmund–Ems Canal.
