= Westbahn =

Westbahn may refer to:

- Westbahn (Austria), a railway line linking Vienna and Salzburg in Austria
- Westbahn (Hanover), a railway line in the German states of Lower Saxony and North Rhine-Westphalia
- Westbahn (Württemberg), a railway line in the German state of Württemberg
- Westbahn (company), an Austrian railway train operating company
