= Mesum =

Village in Germany

Coordinates: 52°14′N 7°30′E

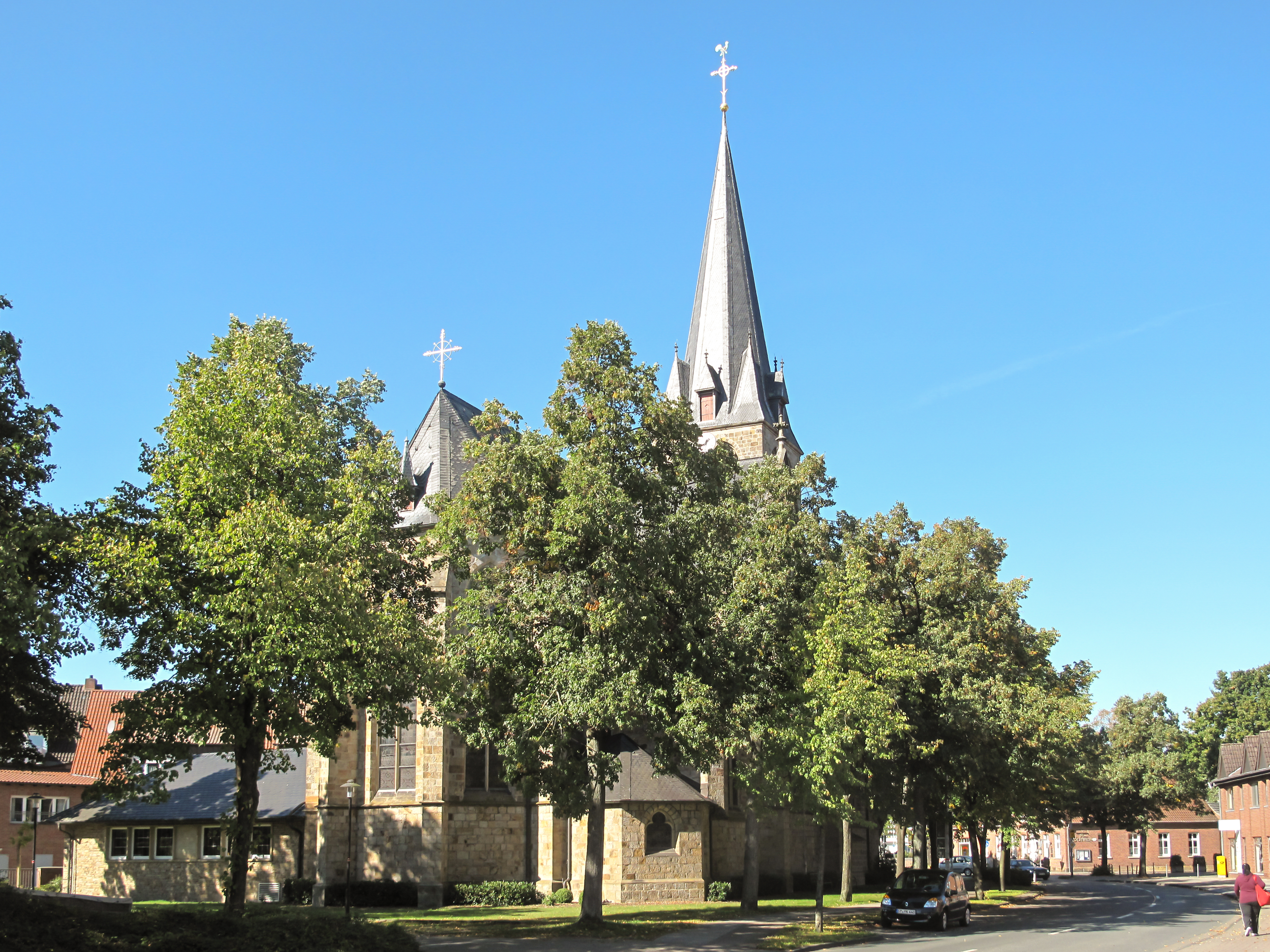
Mesum, church: katholische Pfarrkirche Sankt Johannes Baptist

Mesum is a village south of Rheine, located in the district Steinfurt, part of North Rhine-Westphalia. The current population in 2004 is about 8500. Mesum was first mentioned in 1373 in a document listing the church. That old church still exists as the oldest building of the village.

The village grew in the 19th century with the textile industry. At that time, it was part of the Prussian Kingdom.

== Railway station ==
The village has a railway station Rheine-Mesum, however Rheine has more services.

Link to city-homepage (German)
