= Hörstel station =

Railway station in Hörstel, Germany

Hörstel
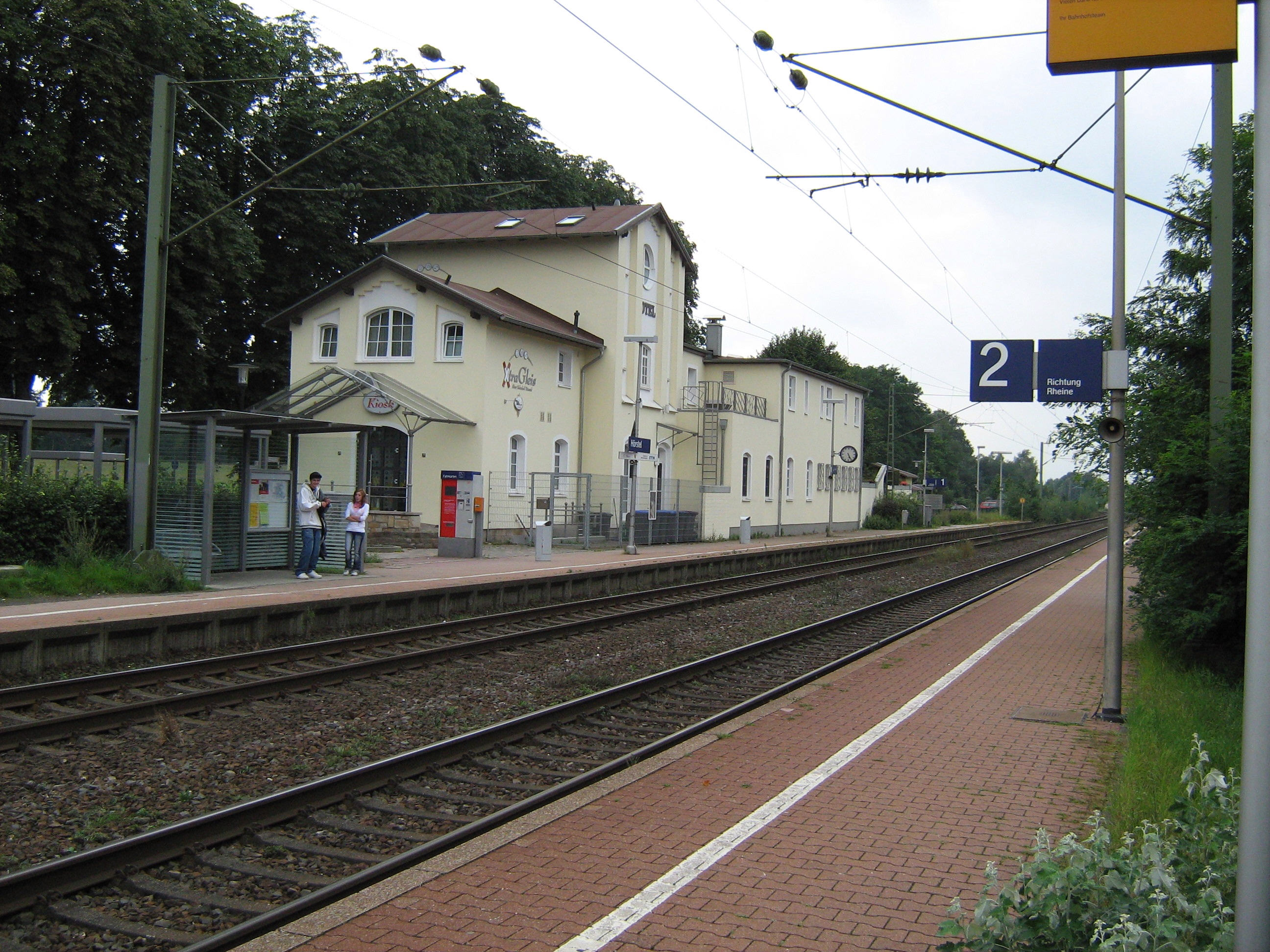
- Hörstel railway station

General information
- Location: Hörstel, North Rhine-Westphalia; Germany
- Coordinates: 52°17′45″N 7°35′32″E
- System: Through station
- Line: Löhne–Rheine railway
- Platforms: 2

Other information
- Station code: n/a
- Category: 5
- Fare zone: Westfalentarif: 51791
- Website: www.bahnhof.de

Services
Preceding station		Following station
Rheine Terminus	RE 60	Ibbenbüren-Esch towards Braunschweig Hbf
Preceding station		Following station
Rheine towards Hengelo	RB 61	Ibbenbüren-Esch towards Bielefeld Hbf
Location

Hörstel is a railway station located in Hörstel, Germany. The station is located on the Löhne–Rheine line. The train services are operated by WestfalenBahn.

== Train services ==
The station is served by the following service(s):

- Regional services RE 60 Rheine - Osnabrück - Minden - Hanover - Braunschweig
- Regional services RB 61 Bad Bentheim - Rheine - Osnabrück - Herford - Bielefeld
