= Münster-Hiltrup station =

Railway station in Münster, Germany

Münster Hiltrup
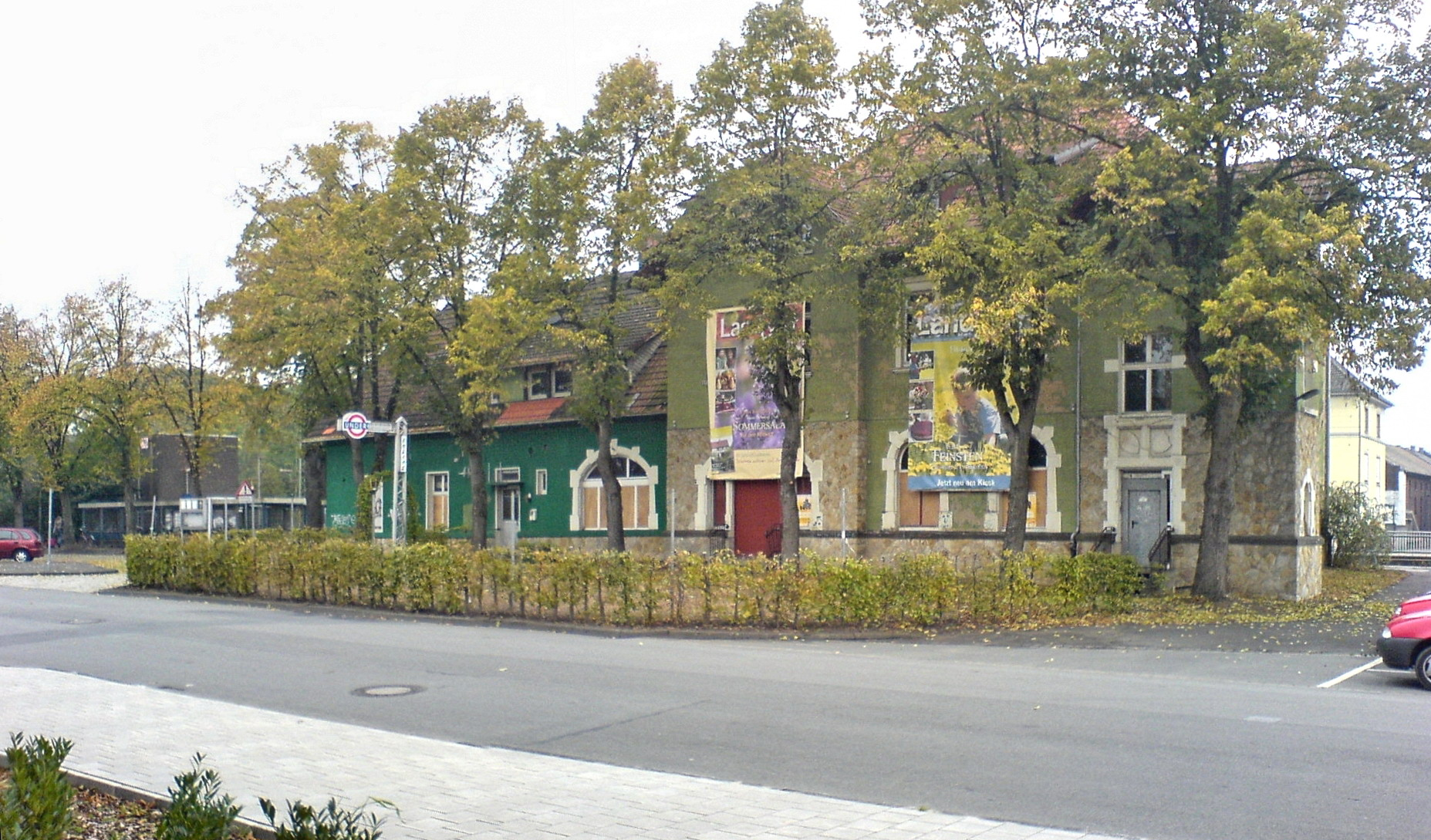

General information
- Location: Bergiusstr. 5, Münster-Hiltrup, NRW; Germany
- Coordinates: 51°54′17″N 7°39′17″E
- Line: Münster–Hamm
- Platforms: 3

Construction
- Accessible: Yes

Other information
- Station code: 2771
- DS100 code: EUN
- IBNR: 8002841
- Category: 5
- Fare zone: Westfalentarif: 55033
- Website: www.bahnhof.de

History
- Opened: 1907 (original station in 1868)

Passengers
- about 2,500

Services
Preceding station	National Express Germany	Following station
Drensteinfurt towards Krefeld Hbf	RE 7 (Rhein-Münsterland-Express)	Münster Hbf towards Rheine
Preceding station		Following station
Münster Hbf Terminus	RB 69	Rinkerode towards Bielefeld Hbf
Münster Hbf Terminus	RB 89	Rinkerode towards Warburg
Location
- Location within North Rhine-Westphalia Location within Germany Location within Europe

Münster-Hiltrup station is a suburban station in the district of Münster-Hiltrup in the city of Münster in the German state of North Rhine-Westphalia. It is served by regional trains between Munster and Hamm and is an important station for commuters and students. The station is conveniently located between central Hiltrup and Hiltrup Ost. In addition, the station is served by several city bus lines.

== History ==
In 1848, the Munster Hamm Railway Company (German: Münster-Hammer Eisenbahn-Gesellschaft) finished the Münster–Hamm railway. On 28 May of the same year it opened Diecke Wief station on the route. Due to its poor situation on the northern edge of the Hohe Ward forest and the long walk to the old village (now Hiltrup Mitte) the station was moved on 1 August 1868 to its present location.

In October 1879 a separate freight yard was added. It was particularly important after the opening the Glasurit factory (which manufactured varnish) in 1903. The plant had its own siding, as did the Rockwool factory (a manufacturer of insulating material), which was built later.

As a result of increasing passenger and freight traffic, a new larger station building was opened in 1907. The station building, which still stands, possessed, among other things, a waiting room and ticket office.

The station, which survived the Second World War unscathed, lost importance in the decades that followed. BASF Coatings (which had taken over the Glasurit company) closed its own rail siding in favour of truck freight, leading to the closure of the freight yard. A new station building with a small ticket office and automated signalling was built next to the old station building, which was eventually closed.

== Current operations ==
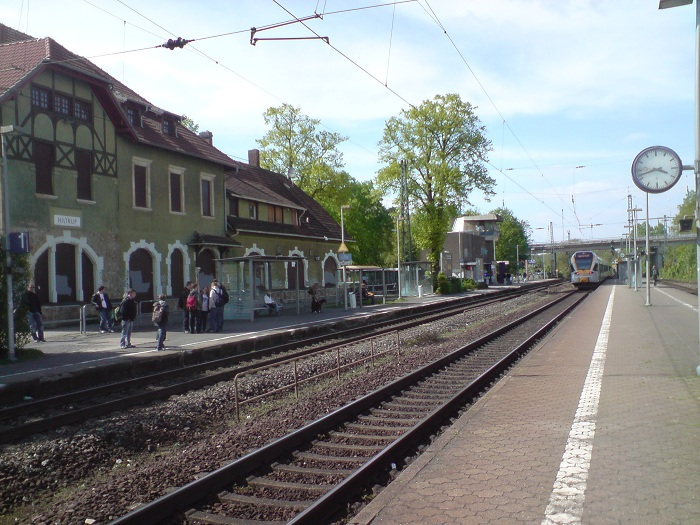
Platforms

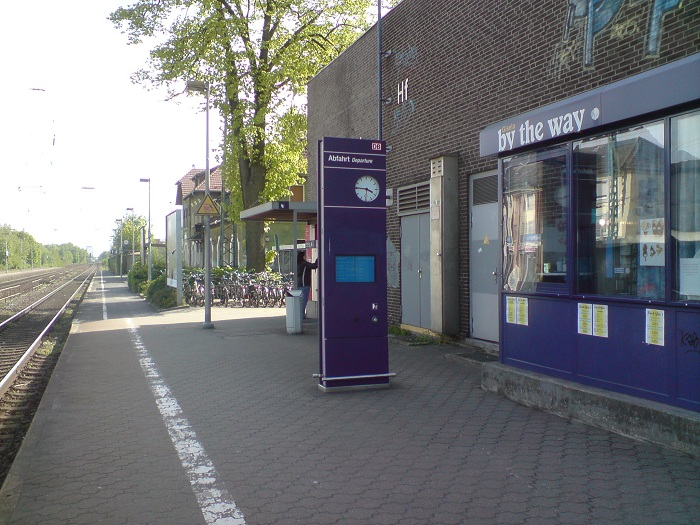
Platform 1 with timetable information, ticket machine and By the way kiosk

Today about 100 train stop at Hiltrup station, which is used daily by about 2,500 passengers. It has four tracks in the station area, three of which are accessible from platforms. The fourth belonged to the former freight yard and is not used anymore. Through traffic currently runs mainly on tracks 1 (towards Hamm) and 2 (towards Munster). Track 3 is only used as required. The station has two ticket machines for regional transport and one for long distance services. Since late 2009, both platforms have an electronic passenger information display.

Münster-Hiltrup station is served by three regional services: an hourly service of the Rhein-Münsterland-Express (RE 7) and a half-hourly service of the combined RB 69/RB 89 Ems-Börde-Bahn Regionalbahn service, which is uncoupled in Hamm.
