= Emsdetten station =

Railway station in Emsdetten, Germany

Emsdetten
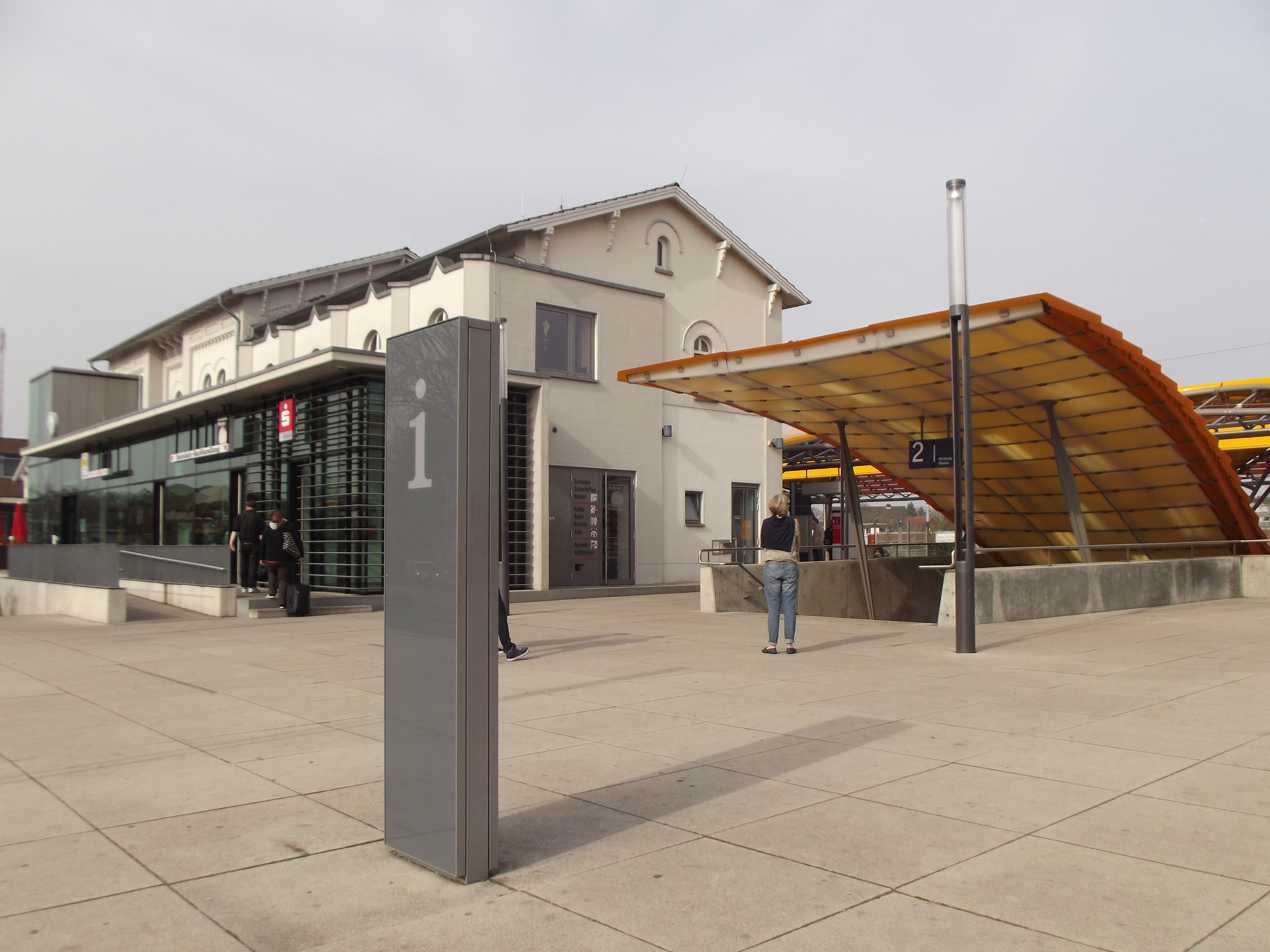
- Emsdetten station

General information
- Location: Hengeloplatz 9, 48282 Emsdetten, NRW; Germany
- Coordinates: 52°10′38″N 7°31′53″E
- Line: Münster–Rheine railway

Construction
- Accessible: Yes

Other information
- Station code: 1590
- DS100 code: EEDT
- IBNR: 8001782
- Category: 4
- Website: www.bahnhof.de

History
- Opened: c. 1854

Services
Preceding station	National Express Germany	Following station
Rheine Terminus	RE 7 (Rhein-Münsterland-Express)	Greven towards Krefeld Hbf
Preceding station		Following station
Rheine towards Emden Hbf	RE 15	Greven towards Münster Hbf
Preceding station		Following station
Rheine-Mesum towards Rheine	RB 65	Reckenfeld towards Münster Hbf
Location
- Location within North Rhine-Westphalia

Emsdetten is a railway station located in Emsdetten, Germany.

The station is located on the Münster–Rheine railway. The train services are operated by Deutsche Bahn and the WestfalenBahn.

== Rail services ==
The following services called at Emsdetten in 2023:

Line	Route	Frequency
RE 7	Krefeld – Neuss – Cologne – Solingen – Wuppertal – Hagen – Hamm – Münster – Emsdetten – Rheine	60 mins
RE 15	Münster – Rheine – Lingen – Leer – Emden – Emden Außenhafen	60 mins
RB 65	Münster – Greven – Emsdetten – Rheine	60 mins 25/35 min (peak)
