= Strümp =

- Subdivision of Meerbusch
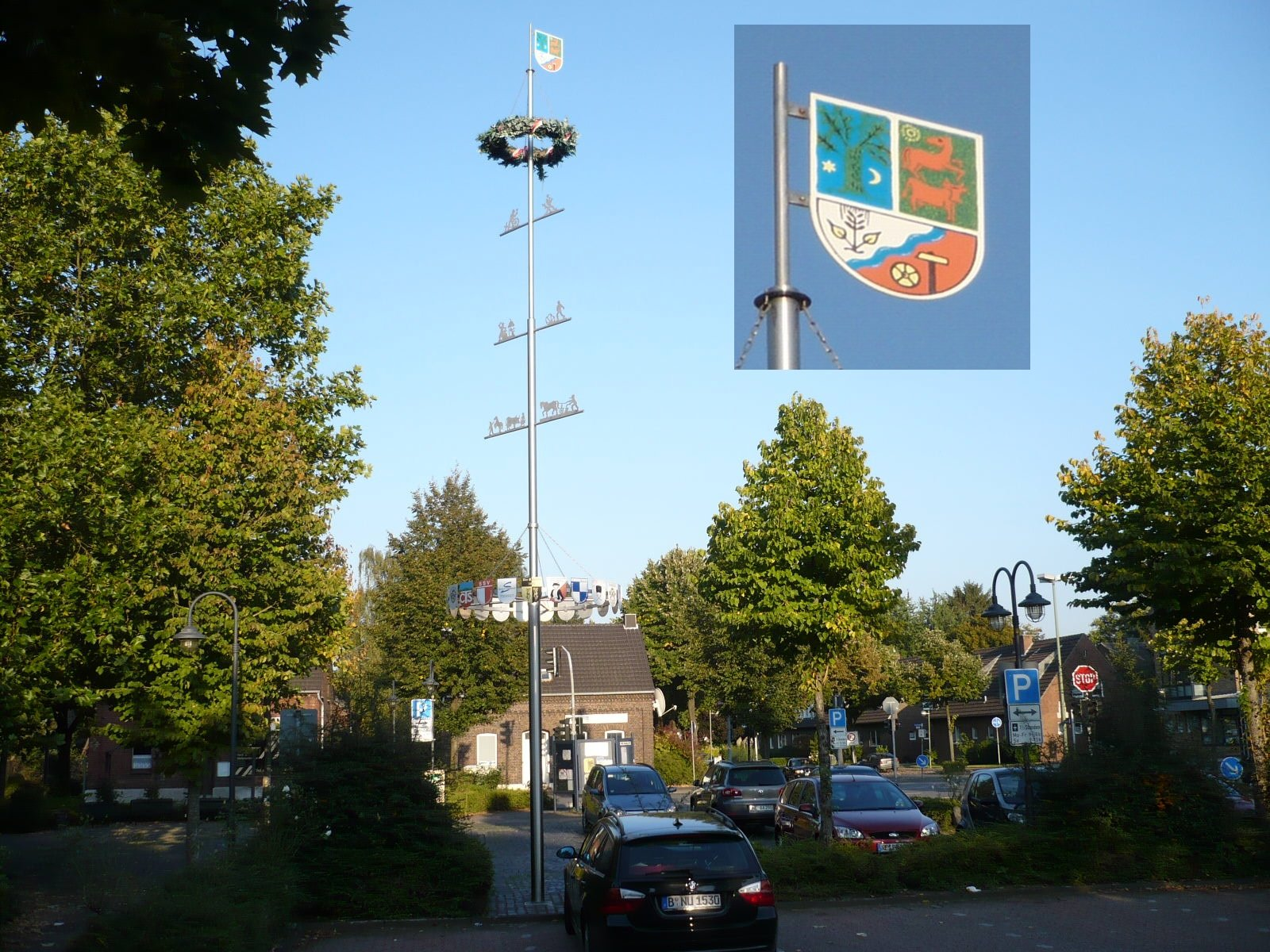
- Town center of Strümp

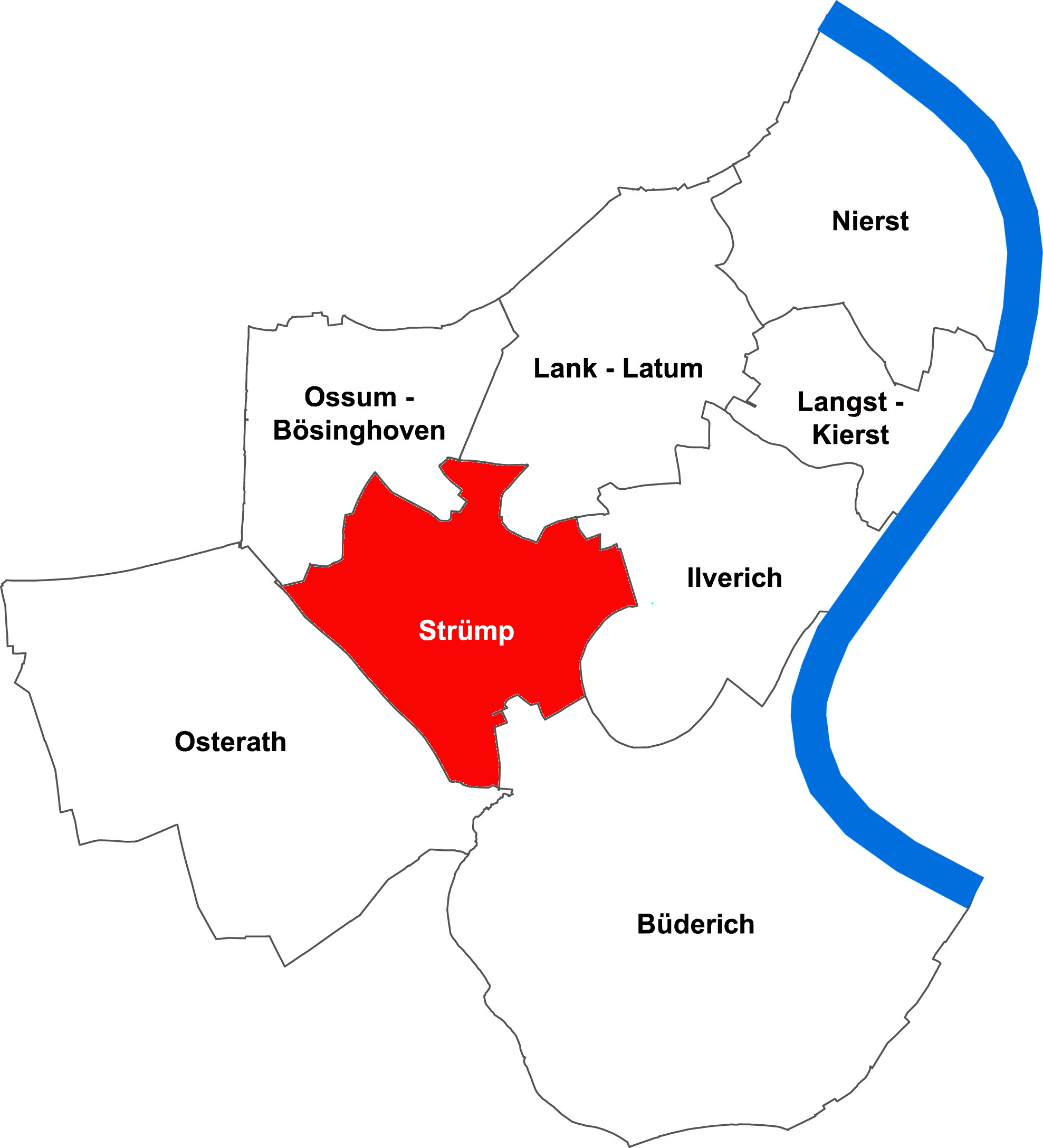
- Location in Meerbusch
- Coordinates: 51°17′2″N 6°39′35″E
- Country: Germany
- State: North Rhine-Westphalia
- County: Rhein-Kreis Neuss
- Town: Meerbusch
- Established: 1970

Area
  - Total: 2.4 sq mi (6.2 km^{2})
- Elevation: 115 ft (35 m)

Population (2007)
  - Total: 5,836
  - Density: 2,438/sq mi (941.3/km^{2})
- Time zone: UTC+1 (Central European Time (CET))
  - Summer (DST): UTC+2 (CEST)
- ZIP code: 40670
- Area code: 02159
- Website: www.meerbusch.de

Strümp is one of the eight districts of the city of Meerbusch, Germany. Its name is believed to be based on the stream Strempe that runs through the town and has its spring nearby.

== Geography ==
Strümp is located in the Center of Meerbusch surrounded by all other districts. Its entire municipal area is situated on a fluvial terrace of the Lower Rhine region and therefore very flat. The so-called Strümper Berg rises barely higher than the surrounding area.

The village of Strümp consists of the town center (at Xantener Straße), two settlements (Schürkesfeld and Rottfeld/Strümper Busch) and a few farms.
