= Münster–Hamm railway =

Railway line in Germany

Overview
- Line number: 2931
- Locale: North Rhine-Westphalia, Germany

Service
- Route number: 410, 455 (long distance)

Technical
- Line length: 36 km (22 mi)
- Track gauge: 1,435 mm (4 ft 8 1/2 in) standard gauge
- Electrification: 15 kV/16.7 Hz AC overhead catenary
- Operating speed: 160 km/h (99.4 mph) (maximum)

The Münster–Hamm railway is an almost 36 kilometre-long, continuous double-track and electrified main line railway from Münster to Hamm in the German state of North Rhine-Westphalia. It was one of Germany's oldest railways, built by the Munster Hamm Railway Company, which was established for this purpose, and opened on 26 May 1848.

== History ==
The Cologne-Minden Railway Company (German: Cöln-Mindener Eisenbahn-Gesellschaft, CME) built its trunk line directly across Westphalia, bypassing the region around the town of Münster. The Munster Hamm Railway Company (Münster-Hammer Eisenbahn-Gesellschaft, MHE) was established to build a branch line to connect with the CME line. This line was opened on 26 May 1848 for passengers and on 8 July 1848 for freight traffic.

The company and line were taken over in 1855 by the Prussian government-funded Royal Westphalian Railway Company (KWE). The line was extended in the following year to Rheine as the Münster–Rheine line.

== Operations ==
Although, formerly individual InterCity services ran on the line, it is now mainly used by regional (Regional-Express and regionalbahn) services running through western Westphalia and southern Münsterland. It is served by:

- the hourly Rhein-Münsterland-Express (RE7) with stops in Hamm, Drensteinfurt, Münster-Hiltrup and Münster Hauptbahnhof.
- every half-hour during the day Monday to Friday, otherwise hourly, the Ems-Börde-Bahn (RB69/89) with stops at all stations.

== Fares ==
Westfalentarif

The line is located in the fare association Westfalentarif.
