= Hanoverian Western Railway =

German railway line

The Hanoverian Western Railway (German: Hannoversche Westbahn) was a line from the Löhne to Emden, built by the Royal Hanoverian State Railways in the mid-19th century in the west of the Kingdom of Hanover in the modern German states of Lower Saxony and North Rhine-Westphalia.

== Route and construction ==
The development of Hanover's western railways began in 1847 with the construction of the Hanover–Minden line. This line connected to the trunk line of the Cologne-Minden Railway Company from Cologne via Hamm.

The Hanoverian Western Railway branches off the Hamm–Minden line at Löhne station and runs along the valleys of the Else and the Hase south of the Wiehen Hills via Bünde and Melle to Osnabrück. As the next section from Osnabrück via Ibbenbüren to Rheine was located in the Prussian Province of Westphalia, it was built by the Prussian government and leased by the Royal Hanoverian State Railways. From Rheine, the line then runs along the Ems river to the north and through Salzbergen, Lingen, Meppen and Papenburg to Emden.

The line was opened in stages between 1854 and 1856. First, the Emden–Papenburg section was completed on 24 November 1854, without any connection to other lines. The Löhne–Osnabrück section was opened on 21 November 1855 to a temporary terminus at the Hannöversche Bahnhof ("Hanoverian station"). The Lingen–Papenburg section was opened on 2 May 1856 and the remaining Osnabrück–Lingen section was put into operation on 23 June 1856. At the same time the central workshops for the entire route were established in Lingen.

In the following years, Rheine developed as a railway junction. On 27 June 1856, the Münster–Rheine line was opened and in 1865 the Almelo–Salzbergen line was opened, connecting to the Dutch network.

== Transfer to Prussia ==
After the Austro-Prussian War, the Kingdom of Hanover was annexed by Prussia. The Royal Hanoverian State Railways became Prussian property and on 15 December 1866, it became a division of the Prussian state railways, based in Hanover.

The section of line between Emden and Rheine was acquired by the Royal Westphalian Railway Company on 1 January 1868.
