= Rhein-Münsterland-Express =

RE 7 Rhein-Münsterland-Express
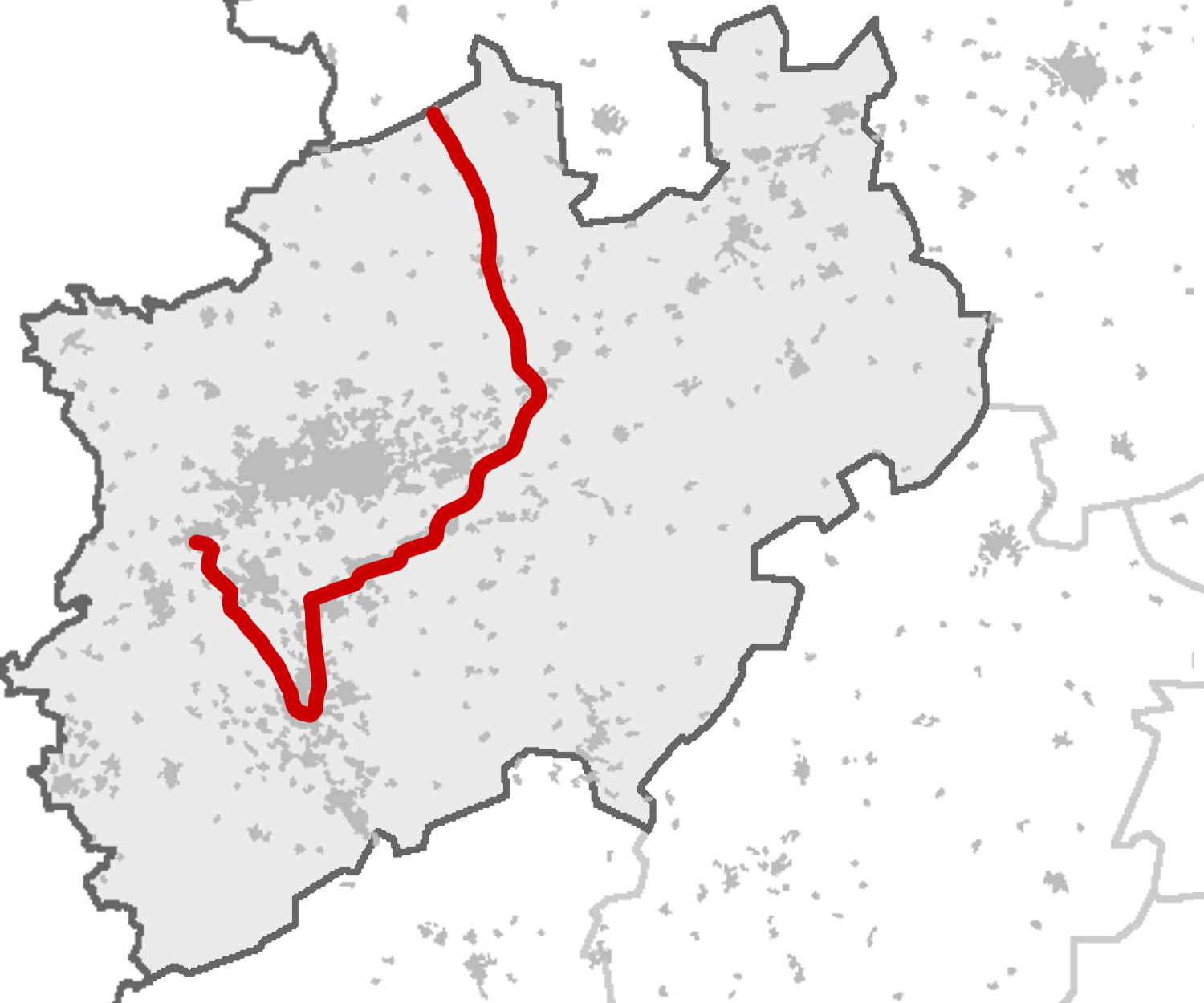
- Route within North Rhine-Westphalia

Overview
- Locale: North Rhine-Westphalia, Germany

Service
- Route number: 495 (Krefeld–Cologne); 455 (Cologne–Hamm); 410 (Hamm–Rheine)

Technical
- Line length: 248 km (154 mi)
- Operating speed: 140 km/h (87 mph) (maximum)

The Rhein-Münsterland-Express (RE 7) is a Regional-Express service in the German state of North Rhine-Westphalia (NRW). The hourly service initially runs to the south east from Krefeld via Neuss to Cologne and then turns to run to the northeast via Solingen, Wuppertal, Hagen to Münster. Every two hours it continues to Rheine.

== History ==
Today's RE 7 is the successor to the former StädteExpress line SE from Aachen via Cologne and Wuppertal to Munster.

From 1998, under the original version of North Rhine-Westphalia’s integrated timetable (ITF 1), the service ran between Düren and Munster. With the introduction of ITF 2 in December 2002, the line was extended at both ends to Aachen and to Rheine. Since the Rhein-Sieg-Express (RE 9) often ran late under the new timetable, in June 2003, the RE 7 exchanged its section on the left (west) bank of the Rhine with the RE 9's left bank route and has since then run to Krefeld. This eliminates a level crossing of rail tracks in Cologne and avoids conflicts between the two services. The short turn around times available for the RE 7 in Krefeld then led to significant delays on the RE 7.

To stabilise the timetable, in 2006 locomotives on the line were changed from class 111 to class 112 and the Rhein-Münsterland-Express since then has runs every two hours to Münster. These changes eventually led to normal on-time running. The Zweckverband SPNV Münsterland (Münsterland rail transport association) is planning, however, to extend hourly services to Rheine. As part of the second stage of modernisation at Rheine station, one of the two disused platforms are to be reactivated, which would make available six platform tracks instead of four. The train could therefore operate without platform conflicts with InterCity services on the Emsland line. In return, Regionalbahn RB 68 services would be discontinued.

The line is operated every hour. Long sections of RE 7 runs parallel to Rhine-Ruhr S-Bahn lines and it has some of the character of a fast S-Bahn service and is perceived by the passengers accordingly. It was operated by DB Regio NRW until 2015. Since December 2015, it has been operated by National Express.

== Route ==
The Rhein-Münsterland-Express runs on the following railway lines:

1. Rheine–Münster line (full length)
2. Münster–Hamm line (full length)
3. Hamm–Hagen line (full length)
4. Dortmund–Wuppertal line (from Hagen Hauptbahnhof)
5. Wuppertal-Düsseldorf line (to Linden/Gruiten junction)
6. Gruiten–Köln-Deutz line (to Köln-Mülheim)
7. Duisburg– Köln-Deutz line (from Cologne-Mülheim)
8. Hohenzollern Bridge
9. Cologne–Krefeld line (entire length)

== Rail operations ==
Since December 2015, the service has been operated by National Express with Bombardier Talent 2s. It was previously operated by DB Regio NRW with push–pull trains, each composed of four double-deck carriages hauled by class 112 locomotives.

== See also ==
- List of regional rail lines in North Rhine-Westphalia
- List of scheduled railway routes in Germany
