= Münster Hauptbahnhof =

Railway station in Münster, Germany

Münster (Westf) Hbf
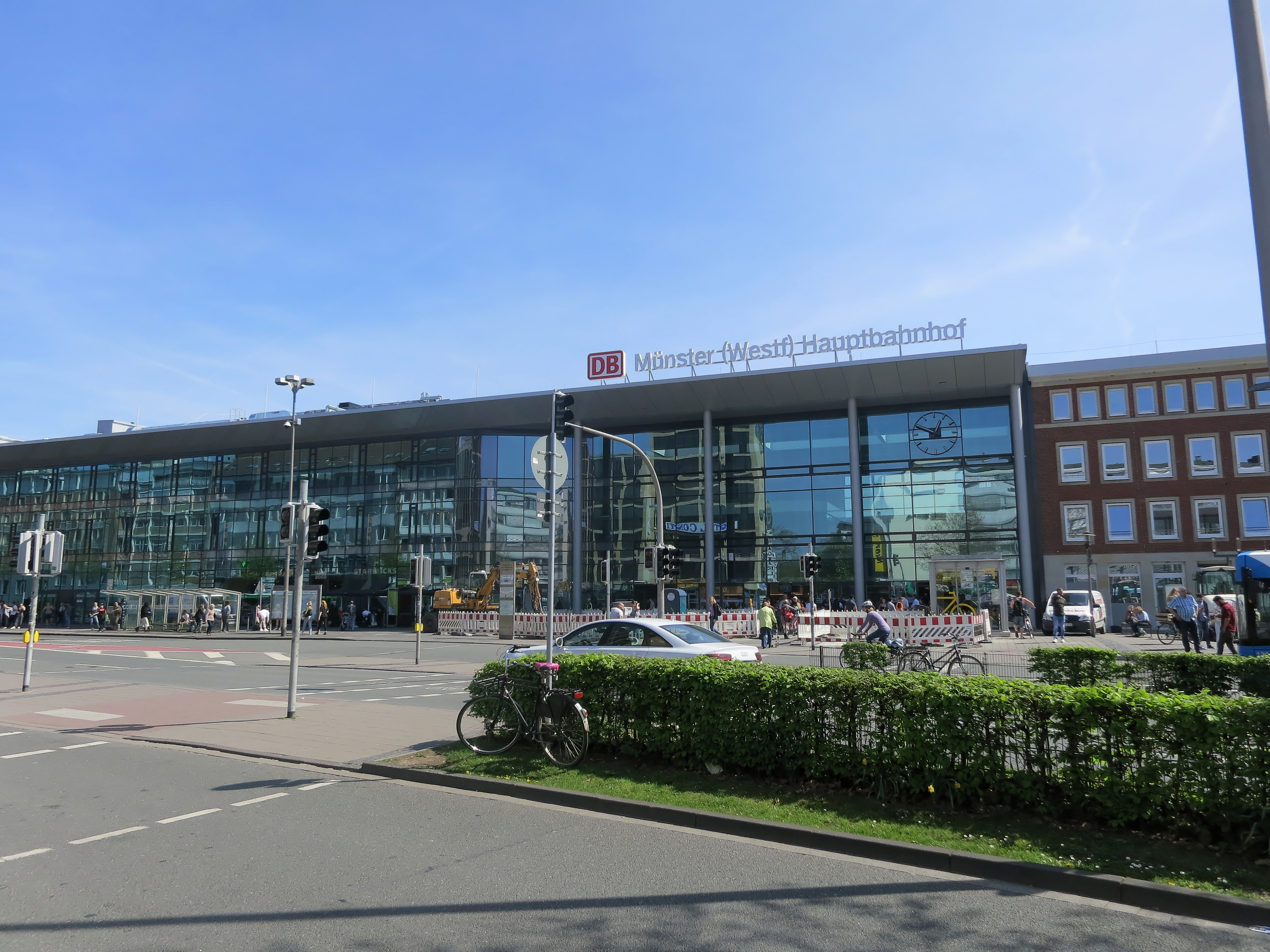
- Station hall seen from Berliner Platz

General information
- Location: Berliner Platz 8-10, Münster, NRW; Germany
- Coordinates: 51°57′24″N 7°38′6″E
- Lines: Wanne-Eickel–Hamburg (KBS 385/425); Warendorf Railway (KBS 406); Münster–Enschede (KBS 407); Münster–Coesfeld (KBS 408); Münster–Rheine (KBS 410); Münster–Hamm (KBS 410); Münster–Preußen (KBS 411); Münster-Lippstadt
- Platforms: 9 (1 closed)

Construction
- Accessible: Yes
- Architect: Professor Raschdorff (original station); Theodor Dierksmeier (new station)
- Architectural style: Dutch Neo-Renaissance (original station); Post-war (new station)

Other information
- Station code: 4280
- DS100 code: EMST
- IBNR: 8000263
- Category: 2
- Fare zone: Westfalentarif: 55011
- Website: www.bahnhof.de

History
- Opened: 1 October 1890

Key dates
- 1930: renovated
- 1945: destroyed
- 1958: rebuilt

Passengers
- 65,000

Services
| Preceding station | DB Fernverkehr | Following station |
|---|---|---|
| Recklinghausen Hbf towards Aachen Hbf | ICE 14 | Osnabrück Hbf towards Berlin Ostbahnhof |
| Recklinghausen Hbf towards Köln Hbf | ICE 33 | Osnabrück Hbf towards Westerland (Sylt) |
| Hamm (Westf) Hbf towards Frankfurt (Main) Hbf | IC 34 | Terminus |
| Recklinghausen Hbf towards Köln Hbf | IC 35 | Rheine towards Emden Außenhafen or Norddeich Mole |
| Dortmund Hbf towards München Hbf | ICE 42 | Osnabrück Hbf towards Hamburg-Altona |
| Dortmund Hbf towards Basel SBB | ICE 43 | Osnabrück Hbf towards Hamburg-Altona |
| Recklinghausen Hbf towards Graz Hbf | ICE 62 | Terminus |
| Terminus | ICE 77 | Osnabrück Hbf towards Berlin Ostbahnhof |
| Preceding station | | Following station |
| Gelsenkirchen Hbf towards Köln Hbf | FLX 20 | Osnabrück Hbf towards Hamburg Hbf |
| Preceding station | DB Regio NRW | Following station |
| Münster-Albachten towards Düsseldorf Hbf | RE 2 | Westbevern towards Osnabrück Hbf |
| Münster-Albachten towards Mönchengladbach Hbf | RE 42 | Terminus |
| Havixbeck towards Coesfeld (Westf) | RB 63 | Münster-Zentrum Nord Terminus |
| Terminus | RB 64 | Münster-Zentrum Nord towards Enschede |
| Preceding station | National Express Germany | Following station |
| Greven towards Rheine | RE 7 (Rhein-Münsterland-Express) | Münster-Hiltrup towards Krefeld Hbf |
| Preceding station | | Following station |
| Terminus | RB 50 | Münster-Amelsbüren towards Dortmund Hbf |
| Terminus | RB 65 | Münster-Sprakel towards Rheine |
| Terminus | RB 66 | Westbevern towards Osnabrück Hbf |
| Terminus | RB 67 | Telgte towards Bielefeld Hbf |
| Münster-Hiltrup towards Bielefeld Hbf | RB 69 | Terminus |
| Münster-Hiltrup towards Warburg | RB 89 | Terminus |
| Preceding station | | Following station |
| Greven towards Emden Hbf | RE 15 | Terminus |
Location

Münster Hauptbahnhof is the main railway station in the city of Münster in Germany.

== History ==
The original Münster station was opened in 1848 by the Münster-Hamm Railway Company, when it opened by the Münster–Hamm railway to the then capital of the Prussian Province of Westphalia as a terminus of its branch line from Hamm, where it connected with Cologne-Minden trunk line. The railway was opened with a ceremonial run on 25 May 1848. The station building was erected in front of the Servatii-Tor (gate) between the modern streets of Wolbecker Straße and Albersloher Weg.

About a month after the opening passenger services were added to the freight traffic on the line. However, the new means of transport was not particularly successful in the early years. On average 100 passengers per train were recorded.

=== 1855-1880 ===
In 1855, the Münster-Hamm Railway Company was taken over in 1855 by the Prussian government-funded Royal Westphalian Railway Company (Königlich-Westfälische Eisenbahn, KWE). This led to a shortening of travel times, because through trains now ran from Warburg to Munster.

In 1856 the Münster–Rheine railway was opened. This line connected at Rheine with the Hanoverian Western Railway, connecting Löhne, Rheine and Emden.

The concession for the construction of the railway connection from the Ruhr area and Venlo via Münster to Hamburg was awarded in 1866 to the Cologne-Minden Railway Company (Cöln-Mindener Eisenbahn-Gesellschaft, CME). The Wanne–Munster section of this route was opened in 1870. It was extended to Osnabrück in 1871 /and to Hamburg in 1874. So Munster now had direct access to the German North Sea ports. The CME built its Münster station east of the KWE station. This station was designed as a stopgap, so that a single station could be built for both railways.

In western Münsterland, at the beginning of the 1860s there were efforts to promote the local economy by building a railway link from Münster via Gronau to Enschede. Construction began in June 1872, but the Münster-Enschede railway company ran into financial difficulties in 1874. The KWE therefore took over its management and on 30 September 1875 it opened the line to Enschede. This line used the KWE station.`

=== 1880–1914 ===
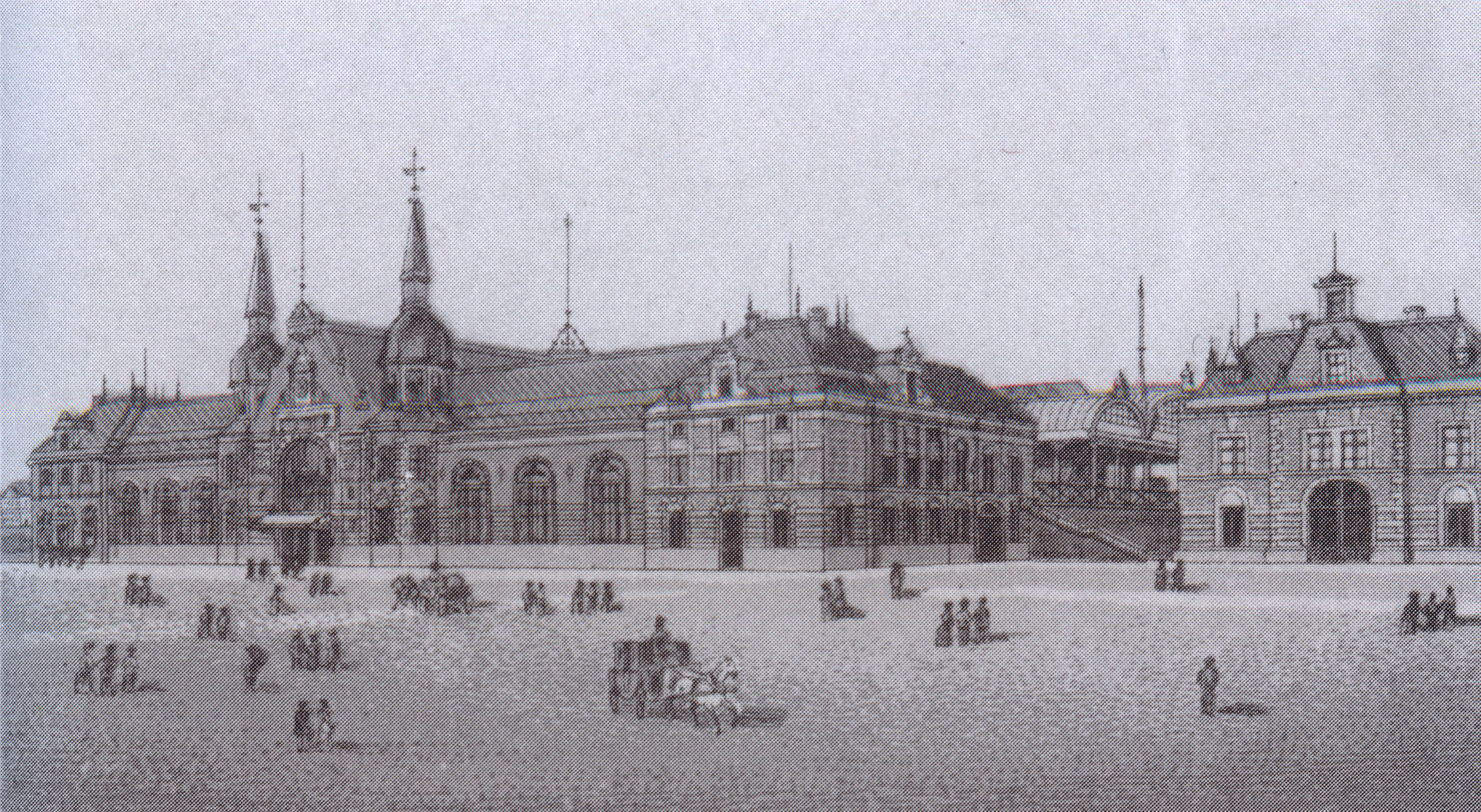
Münster Central Station 1890

After the nationalisation of the railways in 1881, all railways in Münster became part of the Prussian state railways. Already in 1875 the rural municipalities of St. Lamberti and Mauritz had been incorporated into Münster, so it now had planning authority for the station area. In 1885, the financial resources became available to build a central station. The opening of the news station took place on 1 October 1890.

Initially planned as a narrow gauge railway from Münster to Telgte, the line from Münster via Warendorf to Rheda was built as standard gauge. On 8 February 1886, the line between Munster and Warendorf. was opened.

Munster increasingly became a main railway station and the rail network was extended in 1903 over the Münster–Warstein line to Neubeckum and in 1908 over the Baumberge Railway via Coesfeld to Empel-Rees. However, the station did not reach achieve the significance the city sought, mainly because the main line connecting Cologne and the Ruhr with Hanover and Berlin bypassed Munster.

=== 1920–1933 ===
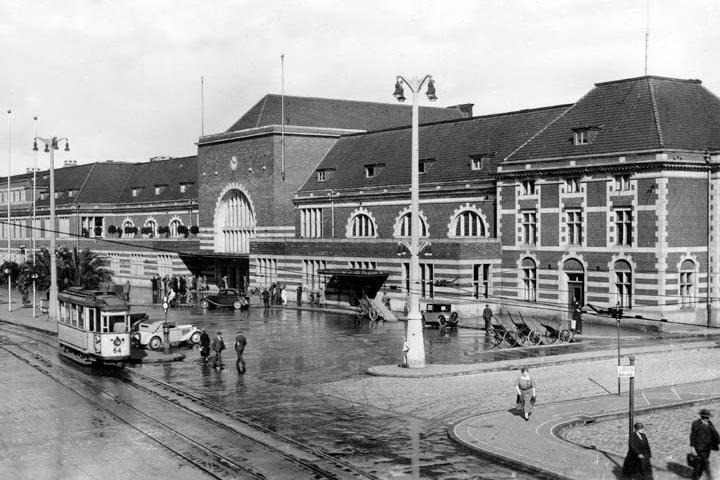
The station after the 1930 reconstruction

In 1920 the German state railways were incorporated in Deutsche Reichsbahn. The line to Lünen was opened in 1928 and the rail freight bypass was opened in 1930.

Since the traffic volume had increased further at the end of the 1920s, the construction of another station platform was necessary. In 1928/30 the station building was rebuilt as a "gateway to the modern city" and the reconstruction was completed at the end of September 1930 for Katholikentag.

=== 1933–1945 ===
Münster was included in the Blitzzug ("Lightning Train") network. From 6 October 1935, Münster was included on the Cologne–Hamburg route of this network.

The situation changed fundamentally with the start of the Second World War. Discounts for travel were abolished in January 1940 and a reduced timetable was introduced. Further reductions of services followed.

In 1941/42, an underground bunker was built at Münster station for 2,000 people. This was captured in 1945, but without injury.

There were 102 air raids on the Münster rail facilities by Allied bombers. The air attacks on the station area destroyed wagons and locomotives as well as 75 to 80% of the tracks. The station building was completely destroyed.

=== 1945–2012 ===
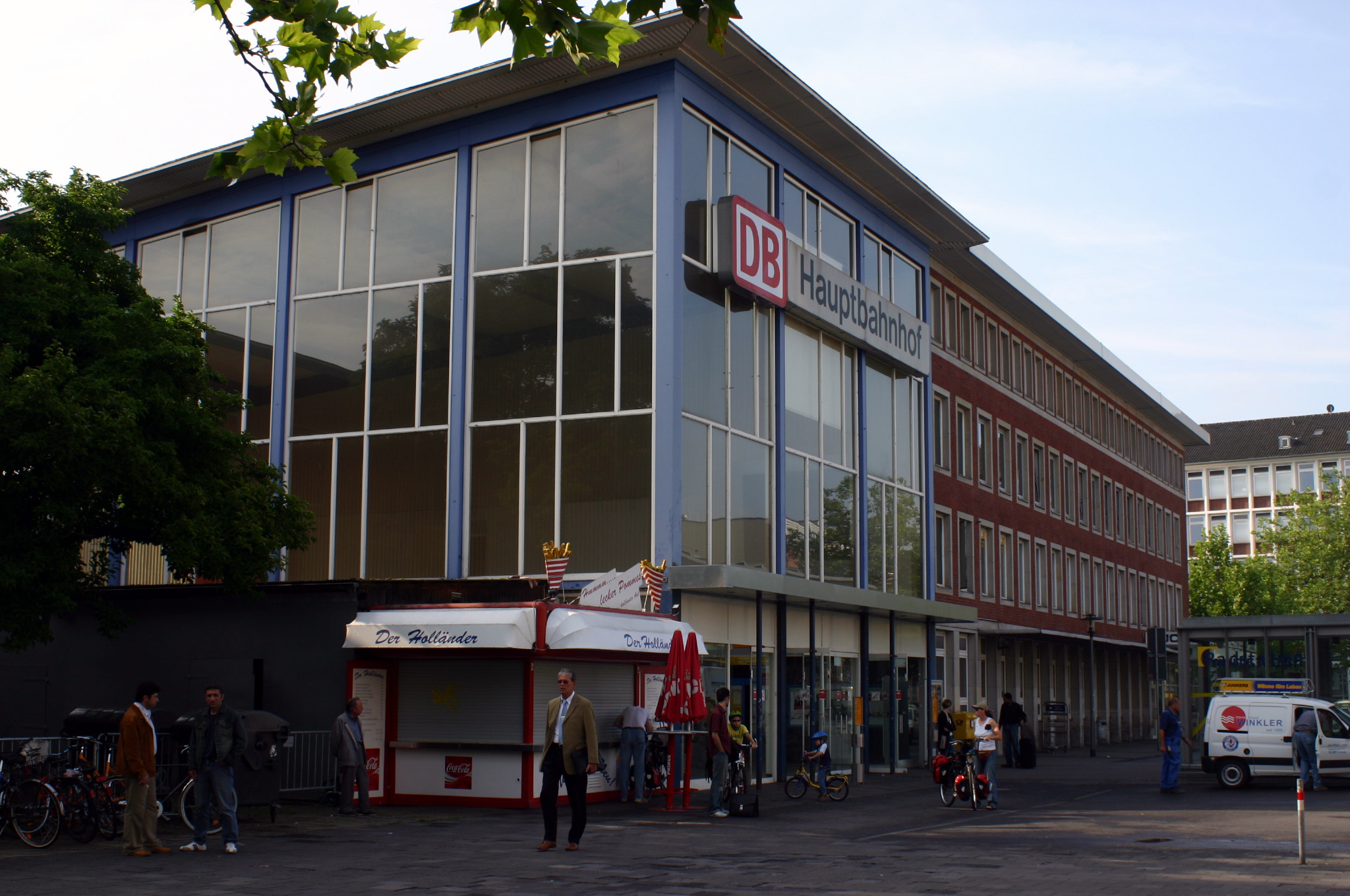
Old station hall, demolished in 2015. Photo taken in 2005.

On 2 April 1945, Allied troops marched into Münster. In late April, the lines to the west were reopened. In the summer of 1945 reconstruction began of tracks and signal boxes. After the repair of damaged bridges in the area of Schleuse Münster, trains could also run to Osnabrück again. Because in the platform area the platforms, stairs and pedestrian tunnels were unusable, they had to be hastily repaired before the commencement of passenger operations.

In 1949, a connection was built to the city's port railway which allowed the passenger trains of the Westfälische Landes-Eisenbahn (Westphalian State Railway) to approach the station from Lippstadt. For this, the Westfälische Landes-Eisenbahn built a fifth platform on the east side of station, which was used only by its own trains. This platform has been closed since the abandonment of passenger service on the line to Lippstadt in the winter timetable of 1975.

At the beginning of the 1950s, the station was rebuilt in several phases. The station hall was completed in 1958 and work at the station was completed 1960. The plans for the work at the station and adjacent areas were prepared by the Munster-born chief architect of Deutsche Bundesbahn, Theodor Dierksmeier.

From 8 June 1960 in Münster was connected to the Trans Europ Express network. The TEA Parsifal express ran from Hamburg to Paris and stopped in Münster.

In September 1968, the whole line between the Ruhr and Hamburg was electrified; the line between Münster and the Ruhr had already been electrified for two years. The line was electrified to Emden in 1981.

Starting on 23 July 2012 the private railway company Hamburg-Köln-Express provides up to three intercity train pairs daily along the route Hamburg - Münster - Cologne. The French rail company SNCF is also thinking about a new TGV lines, including a route from Strasbourg to Frankfurt, Cologne and Münster to Hamburg. A realization of these plans could take place in 2011. As of 2014, no further plans have been announced on this TGV route.

=== Since 2013 ===
From 2013 until 2017, the buildings of the Hauptbahnhof in Münster have been completely rebuilt. The re-opening was on 24 June 2017.

== Rail services ==
In the 2026 timetable, the following services stopped at the station:

=== Long distance ===
| Line | Route | Frequency |
|---|---|---|
| ICE 14 | Cologne – Düsseldorf – Duisburg – Essen – Gelsenkirchen – Recklinghausen – Münster – Osnabrück – Hannover – Wolfsburg – Berlin | 1 train pair |
| ICE 33 | Westerland – Niebüll – Itzehoe – Hamburg – Bremen – Osnabrück – Münster – Düsseldorf – Cologne | 1 train pair |
| IC 34 | (Friedberg –) Siegen – Dortmund – Hamm – Münster | 2 trains |
| IC 35 | (Norddeich Mole –) or (Emden Außenhafen –) Emden – Leer – Papenburg – Meppen – Lingen – Rheine – Münster – Recklinghausen – Wanne-Eickel – Gelsenkirchen – Oberhausen – Duisburg – Düsseldorf – Cologne | Every 2 hours |
| ICE 42 | Hamburg-Altona – Hamburg – Bremen – Osnabrück – Münster – Dortmund – Bochum – Essen – Duisburg – Düsseldorf – Cologne – Siegburg/Bonn – Frankfurt Airport – Mannheim – Stuttgart – Ulm – Augsburg – München-Pasing – Munich | Every 2 hours |
| ICE 43 | Hamburg-Altona – Hamburg – Bremen – Osnabrück – Münster – Dortmund – Bochum – Essen – Duisburg – Düsseldorf – Cologne – Frankfurt Airport – Mannheim – Karlsruhe – Freiburg – Basel | Every 2 hours |
| ICE 62 | Münster – Recklinghausen – Gelsenkirchen – Essen – Duisburg – Düsseldorf – Köln Messe/Deutz – Frankfurt Airport – Mannheim – Stuttgart – Ulm – Augsburg – Munich – Salzburg – Klagenfurt – Graz | 1 train pair |
| ICE 77 | Münster – Osnabrück – Hannover – Berlin – Berlin Ost | 1 early train towards Berlin |
| FLX 20 | Hamburg – Hamburg-Harburg – Bremen – Osnabrück – Münster – Gelsenkirchen – Essen – Duisburg – Düsseldorf – Cologne | 2–3 train pairs |

=== Regional ===
| Line | Route | Frequency |
|---|---|---|
| RE 2 | Düsseldorf – Duisburg – Essen – Gelsenkirchen – Recklinghausen – Münster – Lengerich – Osnabrück | 60 mins |
| RE 7 | Krefeld – Neuss – Cologne – Solingen – Wuppertal – Hagen – Hamm – Münster – Rheine | 60 mins |
| RE 15 | Münster – Rheine – Lingen – Leer – Emden – Emden Außenhafen | 60 mins |
| RE 42 | Münster – Haltern am See – Recklinghausen – Gelsenkirchen – Essen – (Mülheim – Duisburg – Krefeld – Viersen – Mönchengladbach) | 30 mins |
| RB 50 | Dortmund – Lünen – Münster | 60 mins |
| RB 63 | Münster – Coesfeld | 30/60 mins |
| RB 64 | Enschede – Gronau – Münster | 60 mins |
| RB 65 | Rheine – Münster | 60 mins |
| RB 67 | Münster – Gütersloh – Bielefeld | 60 mins |
| RB 69 | Münster – Hamm – Gütersloh – Bielefeld | 60 mins |
| RB 89 | Münster – Hamm – Paderborn – Warburg | 60 mins |

== Fare association ==
Westfalen-Tarif

The station is located in the fare association Westfalen-Tarif.

== See also ==
- Rail transport in Germany
- Railway stations in Germany
