= Rheine station =

Railway station in Rheine, Germany

Rheine
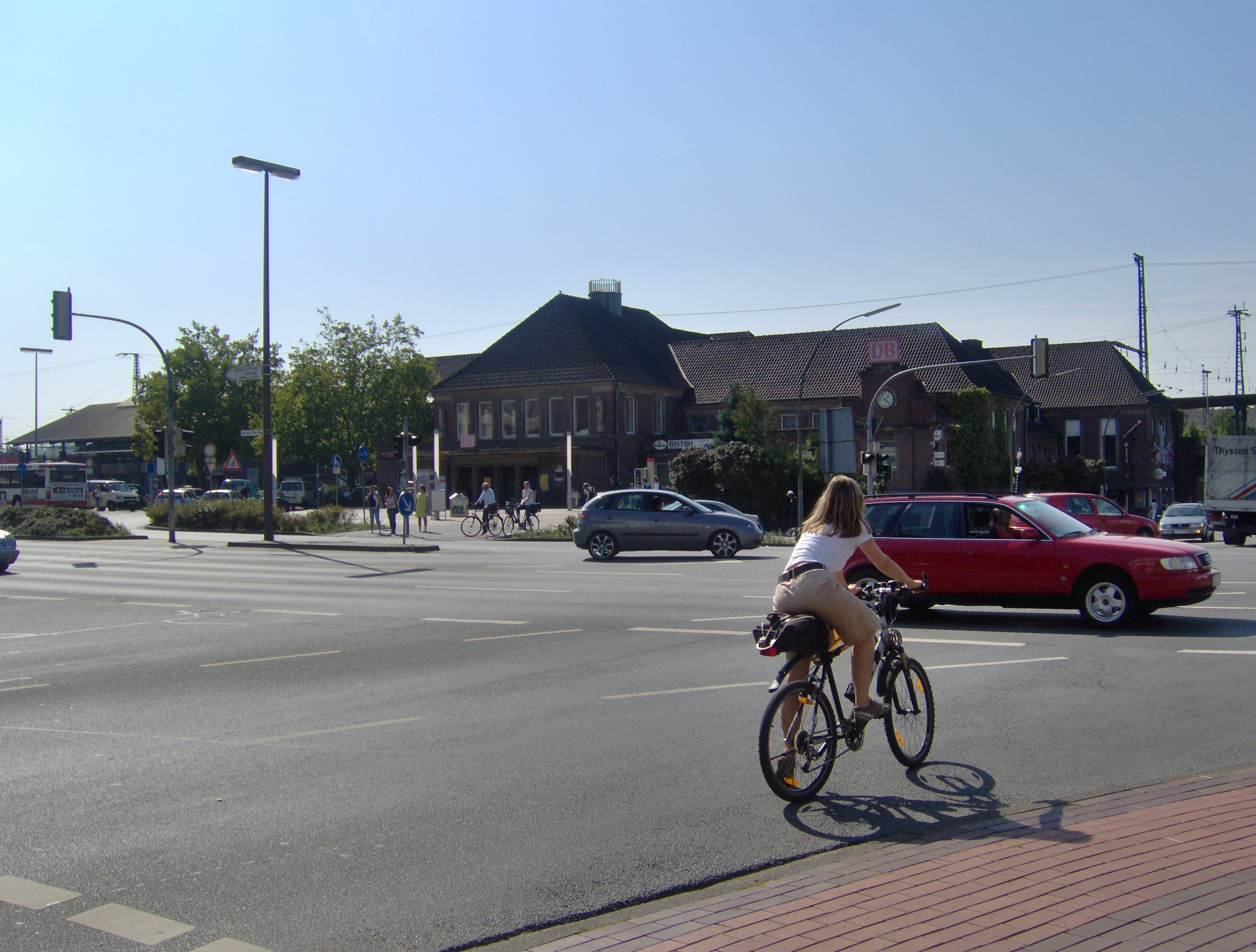
- Rheine railway station

General information
- Location: Am Hauptbahnhofe 2, Rheine, NRW; Germany
- Coordinates: 52°16′32″N 7°26′6″E
- Lines: Löhne–Rheine railway; Emsland Railway; Münster–Rheine railway

Other information
- Station code: 5251
- DS100 code: HR
- IBNR: 8000316
- Category: 2
- Fare zone: VGE: Rheine (buses only); Westfalentarif: 51781
- Website: www.bahnhof.de

History
- Opened: 1 October 1890

Passengers
- ~10,000

Services
Preceding station	DB Fernverkehr	Following station
Lingen (Ems) towards Emden Außenhafen or Norddeich Mole	IC 35	Münster Hbf towards Köln Hbf
Bad Bentheim towards Amsterdam Centraal	ICE 77	Osnabrück Hbf towards Berlin Ostbahnhof
Preceding station		Following station
Salzbergen towards Hengelo	RB 61	Hörstel towards Bielefeld Hbf
Terminus	RB 65	Rheine-Mesum towards Münster Hbf
Preceding station	National Express Germany	Following station
Terminus	RE 7 (Rhein-Münsterland-Express)	Emsdetten towards Krefeld Hbf
Preceding station		Following station
Salzbergen towards Emden Hbf	RE 15	Emsdetten towards Münster Hbf
Terminus	RE 60	Hörstel towards Braunschweig Hbf
Preceding station	DB Regio Nord	Following station
Terminus	RE 62	Ibbenbüren towards Löhne (Westfalen)
Location

Rheine is a railway station located in Rheine, Germany. The station is located on the Löhne–Rheine, Emsland Railway (Rheine-Norddeich Mole) and the Münster–Rheine lines. The train services are operated by Deutsche Bahn, WestfalenBahn and National Express.

== Rail services ==
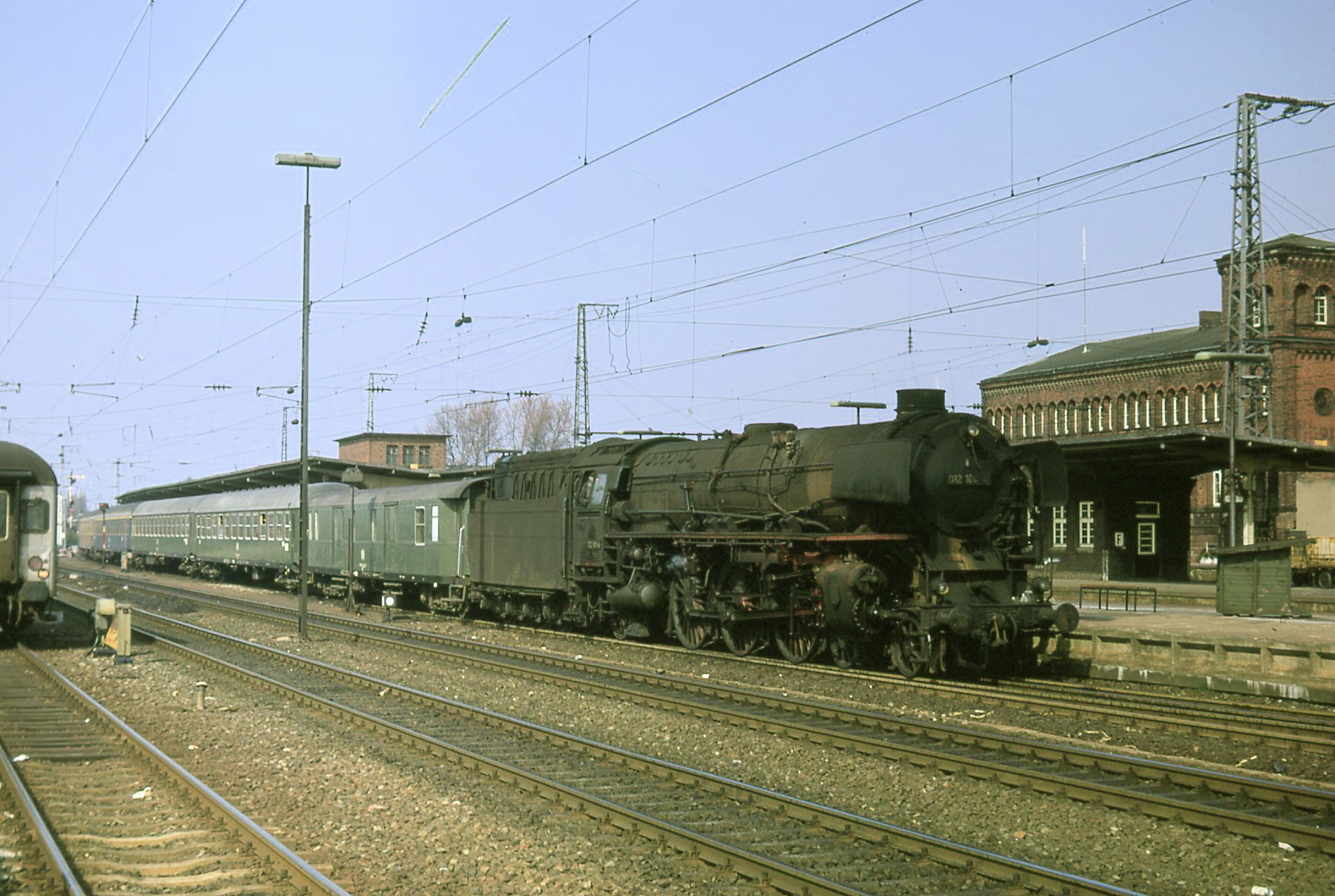
012 Class at Rheine on a train from Emden, Easter 1974

In the 2026 timetable, the following services stop at the station:

=== Long distance services ===
Line	Route		Frequency
IC 35	Norddeich Mole – Norden –	– Emden – Rheine – Münster – Düsseldorf – Cologne	120 min
IC 35	Emden Außenhafen –	– Emden – Rheine – Münster – Düsseldorf – Cologne	120 min
ICE 77	Amsterdam – Hilversum – Amersfoort – Apeldoorn – Deventer – Almelo – Rheine – Osnabrück – Bad Oeynhausen – Minden – Hannover – Wolfsburg – Stendal – Berlin-Spandau – Berlin		120 min

=== Regional ===
In the 2026 timetable, the following regional services stop at the station:

Line	Route	Frequency
RE 7	Krefeld – Neuss – Cologne – Solingen – Wuppertal – Hagen – Hamm – Münster – Rheine	60 mins
RE 15	Münster – Rheine – Lingen – Leer – Emden – Emden Außenhafen	60 mins
RE 60	Rheine – Ibbenbüren – Osnabrück – Bünde – Minden – Hannover – Braunschweig	120 mins
RE 62	Rheine – Ibbenbüren – Osnabrück – Melle – Löhne	120 mins
RB 61	Hengelo – Bad Bentheim – Rheine – Ibbenbüren – Osnabrück – Herford – Bielefeld	60 mins
RB 65	Münster – Greven – Emsdetten – Rheine	60 mins 25/35 min (peak)

== Bus services ==
Outside the station is a bus station.
