= Münster–Rheine railway =

Railway line in Germany

Overview
- Line number: 2931 (Hamm−Emden)
- Locale: North Rhine-Westphalia, Germany

Service
- Route number: 410

Technical
- Line length: 39 km (24 mi)
- Number of tracks: 2
- Track gauge: 1,435 mm (4 ft 8 1/2 in) standard gauge
- Electrification: 15 kV/16.7 Hz AC overhead catenary

The Münster–Rheine railway is a nearly 39 km long main line railway from Münster to Rheine in the German state of North Rhine-Westphalia. It is entirely double track and electrified.

It was opened by the Prussian government-funded Royal Westphalian Railway Company in 1856 and is one of the oldest railways in Germany.

== History ==
The Royal Westphalian Railway (German: Königlich-Westfälische Eisenbahn, KWE) built its main line from Hamm to Warburg in the early 1850s. In 1855, the KWE took over the Munster-Hamm Railway Company (Münster-Hammer Eisenbahn-Gesellschaft), together with its line to Munster, which it then extended further north to Rheine. It opened its line on 23 June 1856, reaching Rheine station on the same day as both of the two sections of the Hanoverian Western Railway were completed to the station: the line from Löhne and the Emsland Railway to the North Sea port of Emden.

In 1879, the Rhenish Railway Company (Rheinische Eisenbahn-Gesellschaft, RhE) opened its own North Sea route from Duisburg via Rheine to Quakenbrück and so made the station one of the major railway junctions in north-western Germany.

== Current operations ==
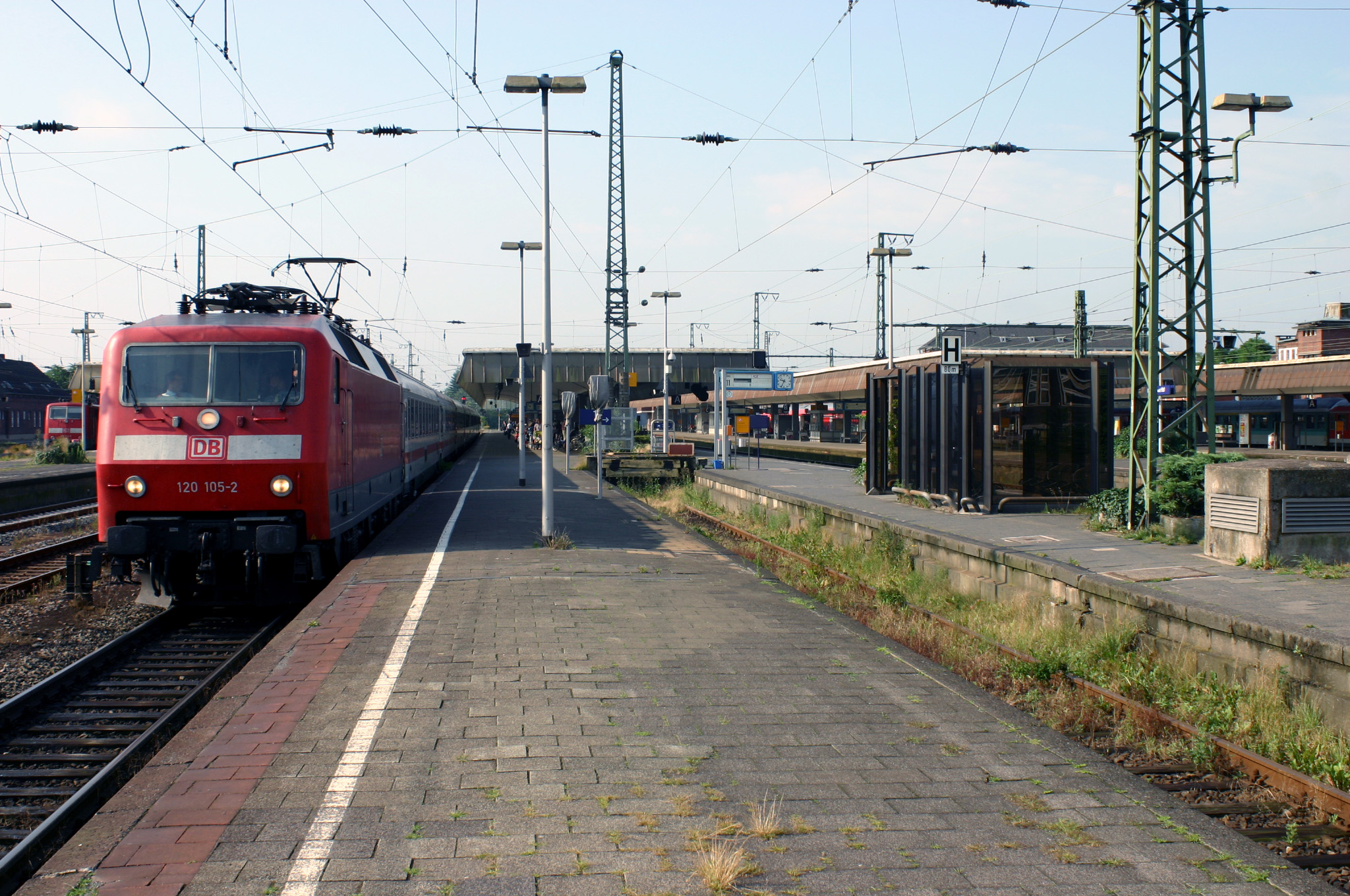
IC 2333 leaving Münster Hbf to run to Norddeich Mole via Emden Hbf

Two Regional-Express service operate on the line: the RE 15 (the Emsland-Express) and the RE 7 (Rhein-Münsterland-Express), both hourly. The RB 65 Regionalbahn service (the Ems-Bahn) runs at 30-minute intervals on the line. Every two hours InterCity services between Norddeich Mole and Luxembourg run on the line.

== Fares ==
Westfalentarif

The line is located in the area of the fare association Westfalentarif.
