= Vlotho station =

Railway station in Vlotho, Germany

Vlotho
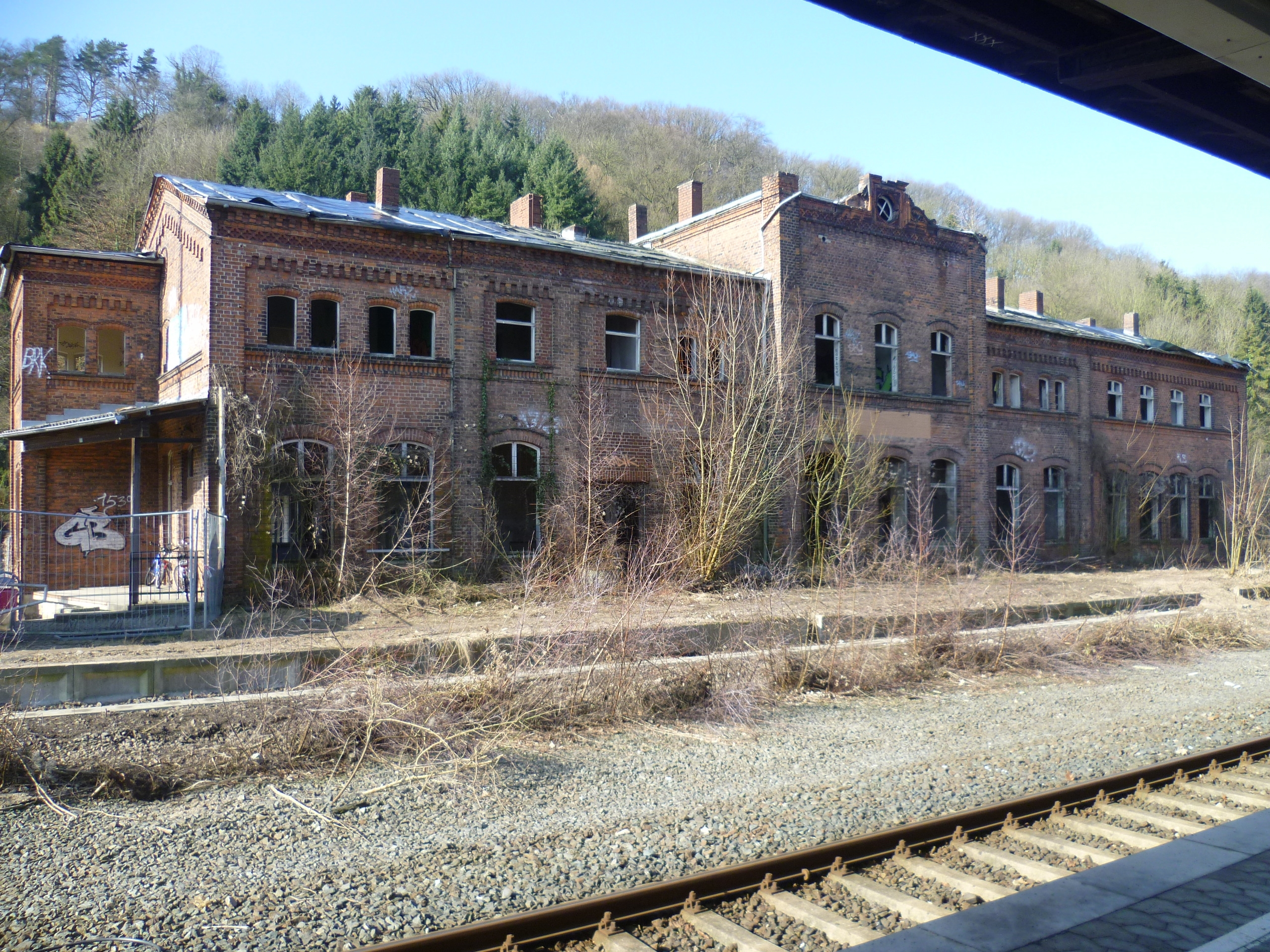
- The former station building from the island platform

General information
- Location: Vlotho, NRW; Germany
- Coordinates: 52°10′19″N 8°51′49″E
- Lines: Elze–Löhne railway (KBS 372)
- Platforms: 2

Construction
- Accessible: No
- Architect: Wilhelm Köster, Herford (1908)

Other information
- Station code: 6428
- DS100 code: HVLO
- IBNR: 8006091
- Category: 6
- Fare zone: Westfalentarif: 62911
- Website: www.bahnhof.de

History
- Opened: 1875, extended in 1908/09

Passengers
- 500 (2010)

Services
Preceding station	Start	Following station
Bad Oeynhausen Süd towards Herford	RB 77	Rinteln towards Hildesheim Hbf
Location

Vlotho station is a station on the Elze–Löhne railway in the east Westphalian town of Vlotho in the Herford district of the German state of North Rhine-Westphalia. The line connects Löhne, Hamelin and Hildesheim and is served by the Weser-Bahn service. All buildings including the entrance building have not been used for their original purposes since 1992 and they are no longer owned by Deutsche Bahn.

== Conditions ==
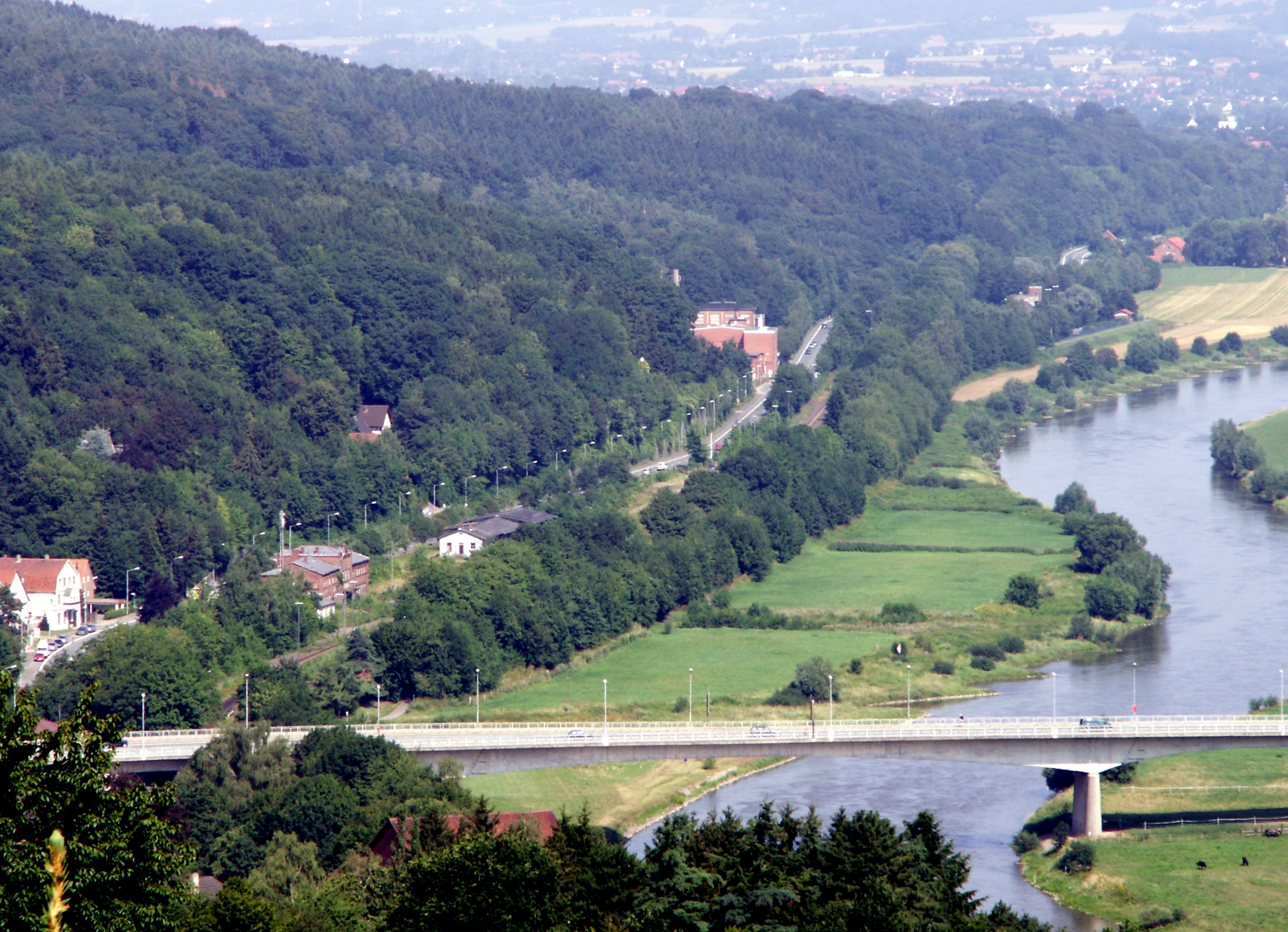
2006: Vlotho station on the slopes of Amtshausberg. The row of trees to the right of the B514 are on either side of the tracks, the former sugar factory is just above the right centre of the picture.

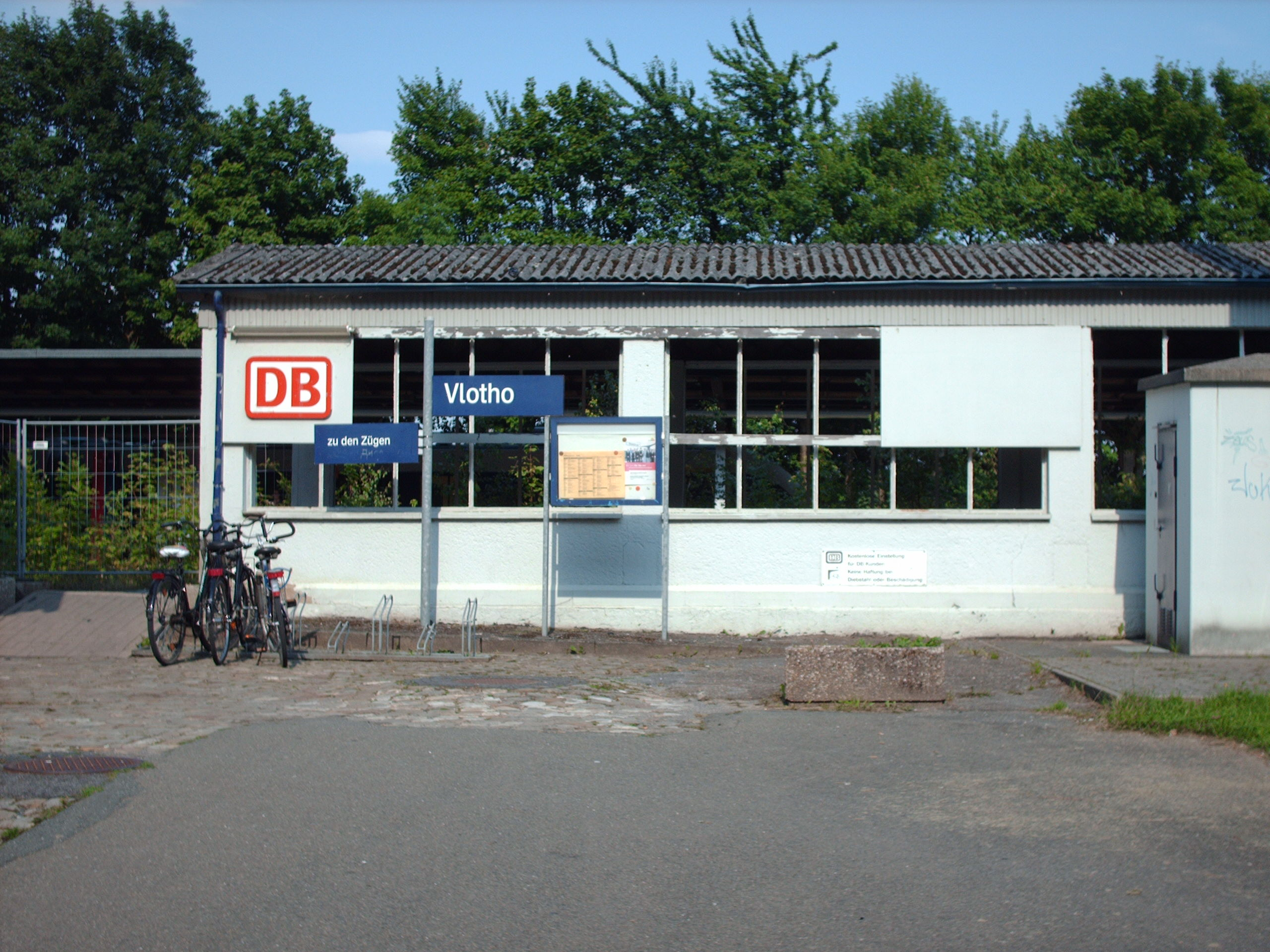
Blocked entrance to the former railway underpass

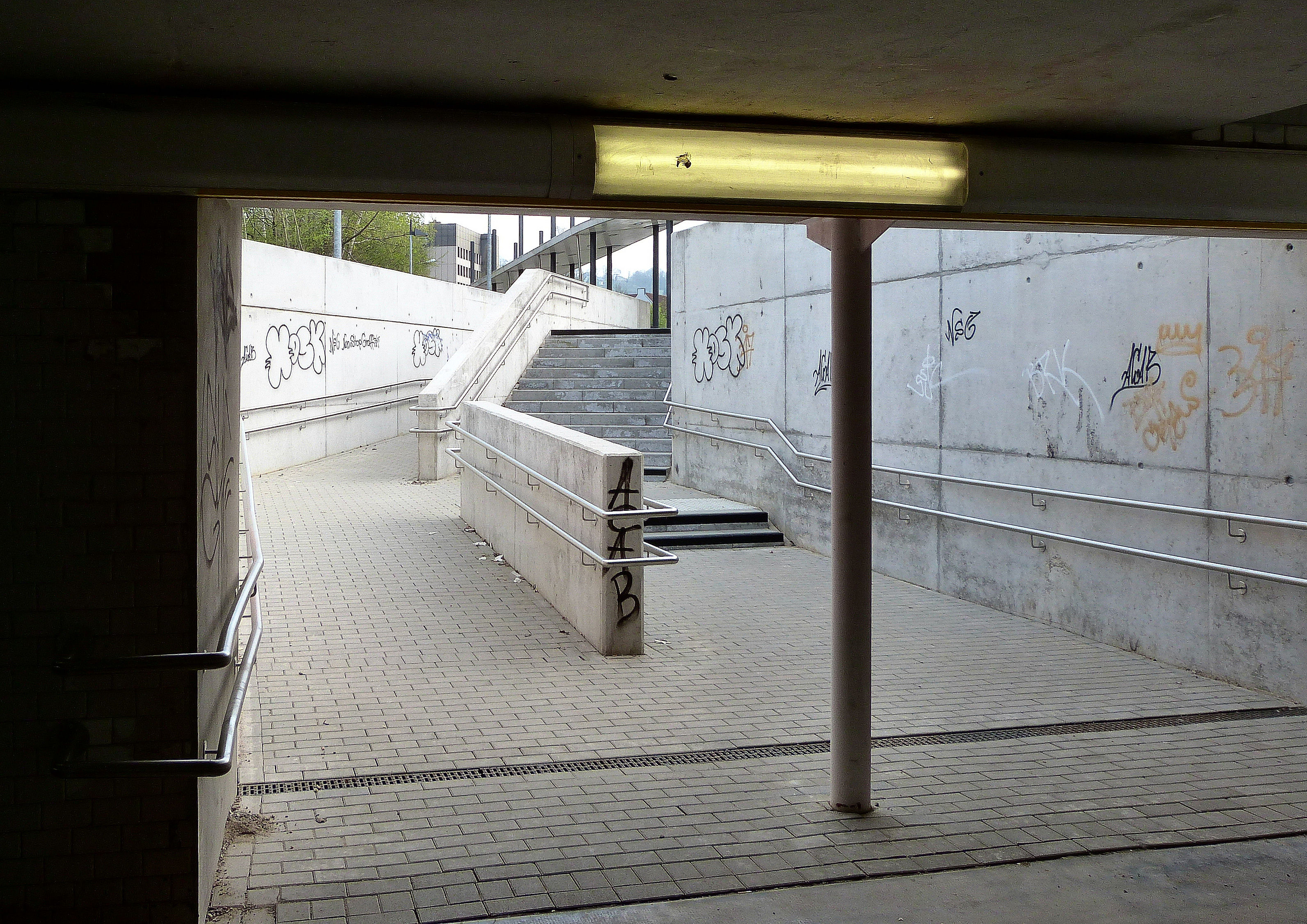
Accessible path to the railway underpass (location of the photographer) since April 2013 from the bus station, Vlotho town hall in the background

The station is classified by Deutsche Bahn as a category 6 station. It is on federal highway 514 northeast of the town centre on the west bank of the Weser. The Vlotho town hall is nearby. Barrier-free access was built to the platform via an underpass from the adjacent town bus station in 2012.

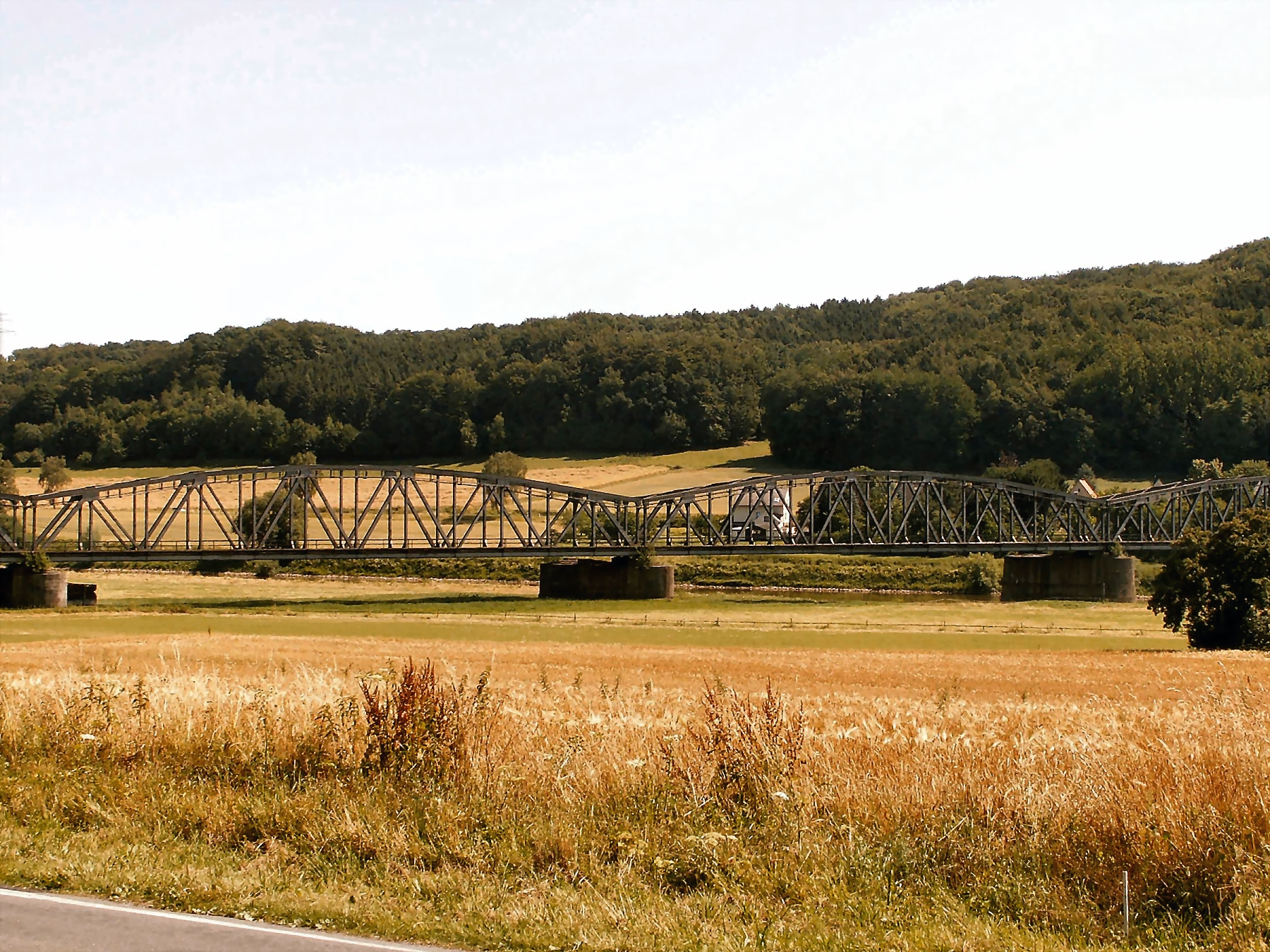
Rail bridge over the Weser to the east of the station

== Operations ==
The station is served hourly (every two hours on weekends) by Regionalbahn service RB 77, called the Weser-Bahn, (Bünde–Löhne–Rinteln–Hamelin–Hildesheim Hbf–Bodenburg). It is operated by Regionalverkehre Start Deutschland, using Alstom Coradia LINT diesel railcars.

Train class	Route	Frequency
RB 77	Weser-Bahn (Bünde (Westf) –) Löhne (Westf) – Vlotho – Hamelin – Elze – Nordstemmen – Hildesheim	Hourly

The station is covered by Der Sechser (“the six”) fares of the Zweckverband Verkehrsverbund OWL (Ostwestfalen-Lippe transport association), which are valid as far as Rinteln, which is just into Lower Saxony. The Niedersachsen-Ticket of Lower Saxony is also valid to Vlotho.

== Preservation and architectural history ==
The former station building is constructed in brick-faced masonry, has gable roofs and a central hip roof and is covered with tar paper. The facade is divided by ornamental stonework as well as encircling cornices and lesene projections. In the upper area of the central section of the building, stucco decorations are centred on a round window. On the left and right of the building there are bay-like extensions, which are also partly covered with decorative brickwork. The original flat-arched windows have been replaced with some newer ones.

The original design of the complex was the work of a departmental engineer of the Hanover-Altenbeken Railway Company (Hannover-Altenbekener Eisenbahn-Gesellschaft), which had acquired the concession for the construction of the railway between Elze and Löhne. The main building, which had two-storeys and a basement, was 22.6 m long and 11 m wide and had a 12.3 m-wide avant-corps. Harmonious extensions to the original building were built in 1908/09 to a design of the architect Wilhelm Köster, who settled in Herford in 1892. He was a specialist in the construction of tobacco factories, among other things, at home and abroad. In addition, he designed and built many prestigious villas built in the late Gründerzeit.

== History ==
After initial reservations, in 1845 most of the merchants in Vlotho supported a railway station in Vlotho on the Cologne-Minden Railway. For centuries, the Vlotho port on the Weser was a trading centre for the Ravensberger Land and for the Principality of Lippe and for freight traffic to and from Bremen and Thuringia. They feared economic disadvantages from its decline because of changes that had already occurred and the coming changes to the infrastructure (to roads and trails, as well as the increasing development of railways). Not long after, Vlotho supported the idea of a direct rail link from Minden via Vlotho to Paderborn. This would lead to Vlotho continuing to be a major gateway to northern Lippe, which up to that time had been served by cart haulage. The line that was eventually built was called the Löhne–Vienenburg line. During the construction of the Löhne–Hamelin line migrant workers from non-German speaking countries worked for the first time in the area; in Vlotho there were Poles.

Construction work in Vlotho began in 1872 with the demolition of twelve houses in lower Langen Straße. Many residents were afraid that they would lose light and air as a result of the high embankment. During the construction of the freight depot, a house was destroyed by a landslide in 1874. On 30 June 1875, the Löhne–Hamelin line was officially opened with its first passenger train. All Vlotho notables were invited as guests of honour.

The new line closed a gap between the Elze–Goslar line (opened in 1853) and the Löhne–Osnabrück line (opened in 1855) and was thus of importance for east–west traffic. Vlothor station at this time had an entrance building and a small goods shed. Interlockings were installed on the line in 1907. The line was duplicated in 1908–1911. The station building was extended in 1909 with the addition of an area of about 800 square metres. In 1934, there were alterations to an area that was already used for apartments for rail workers. In the same year toilet facilities were installed in the building; these were made accessible from the station forecourt by an external staircase in 1968.

The goods shed was extended in 1923. In the last days of the Second World War the railway bridge over the Weser river was attacked by Allied bombers, but it was not made impassable. On 3 April 1945, when a panzer division was resisting advancing American troops in the area now called Exter, German pioneers attempted to impede the crossing of the Weser by blowing up the bridge. In contrast to the nearby road bridge they only partially succeeded. During the postwar reconstruction, the rail link between the stations in Vlotho and Veltheim (Porta Westfalica) was reopened as a single track line in 1946.

Although located near the Weser port, it had no direct connection from the station. Shortly before the First World War a separate track had been built to the boundary of the former Tintelnot sugar factory. The terminus of the Herford Light Railway (Herforder Kleinbahn), which connected Vlotho and Wallenbrück via Bad Salzuflen and Herford, was located near the station of the Reichsbahn and Deutsche Bahn and existed from 1903 until 1962.

=== 1945 and thereafter ===
After the war took traffic on the Elze–Löhne railway increased strongly because of the strong economic growth. The nearby Veltheim community power station, which was established in 1959, received a large proportion of its fuel by rail. Passenger services operated directly to and from Brunswick, Aachen and Mönchengladbach.

The later gradually increasing shift of freight and passenger traffic from rail to road had consequences. An average of 55 freight and 65 passenger trains passed through Vlotho station each day in 1961, but by 1992 the average had fallen to three freight and 22 passenger trains. The three freight trains served the Veltheim community power station with coal for electricity generation. Similarly, the average daily ticket sales had fallen from 600 to 30 and baggage handled had fallen from 50 to five pieces. The station operations had become unprofitable. In the course of rationalisation, freight operations were closed in June 1975. The goods shed was sold to a private owner. The signalbox that had controlled the station points burned down in October 2011 and was demolished.

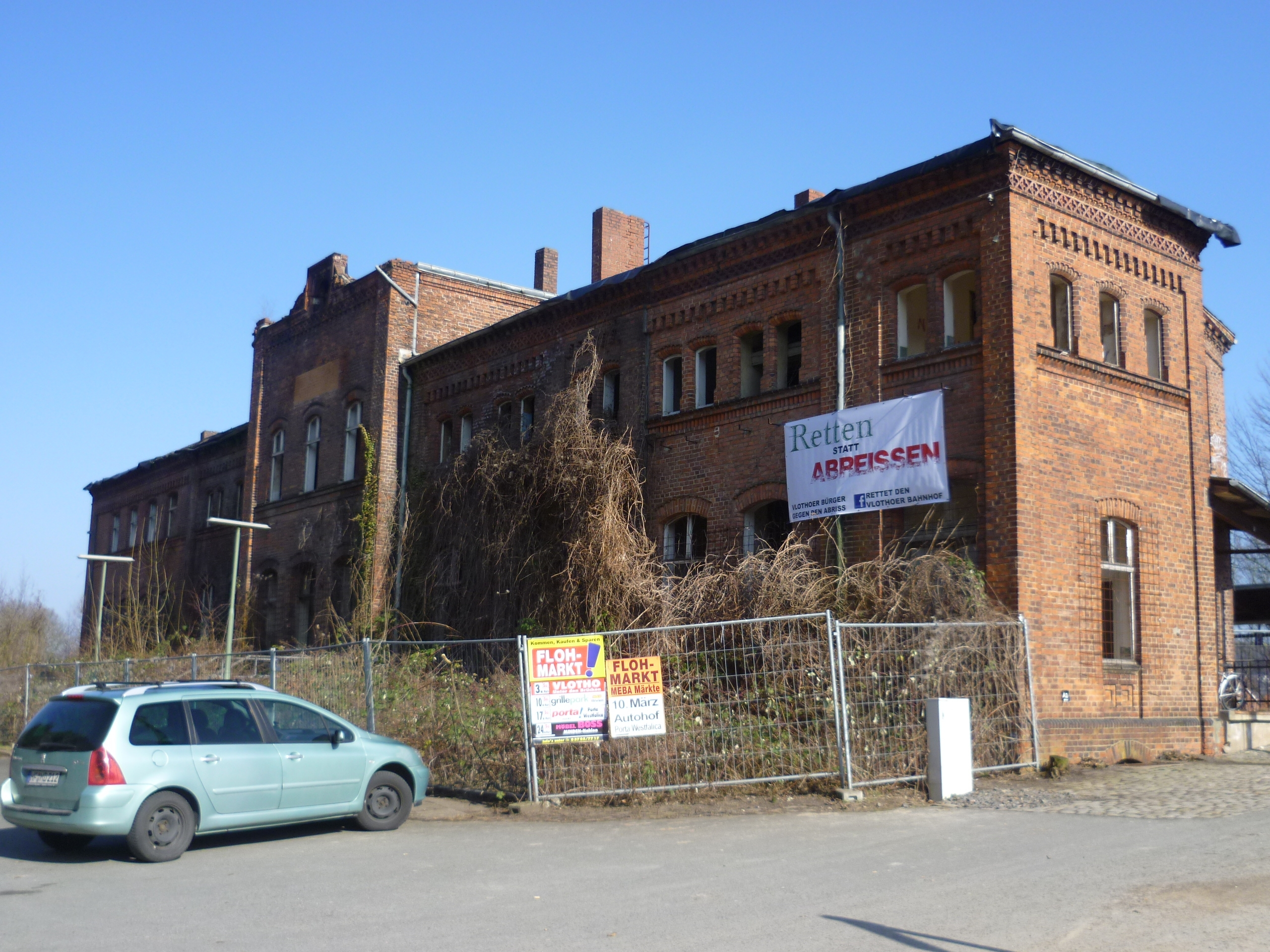
Vlotho station with the sign of the citizens group, March 2013

The former station building, which was heritage listed in 1988, was sold by Deutsche Bundesbahn to a private individual in 1992. He let the buildings stand empty, because in his opinion, a plan for its re-use could not be implemented. In 2007, the town bought the building, which had fallen into disrepair, from the heirs of the original purchaser. The station building is still empty and only makeshift repairs have prevented continuing decay. In the municipality there were considerations of removing the building from the heritage list and demolishing it. In February 2013, a new citizen group was founded to oppose the demolition of the station building and to support the use of station for community purposes.
