= Rinteln station =

Railway station in Rinteln, Germany

Rinteln
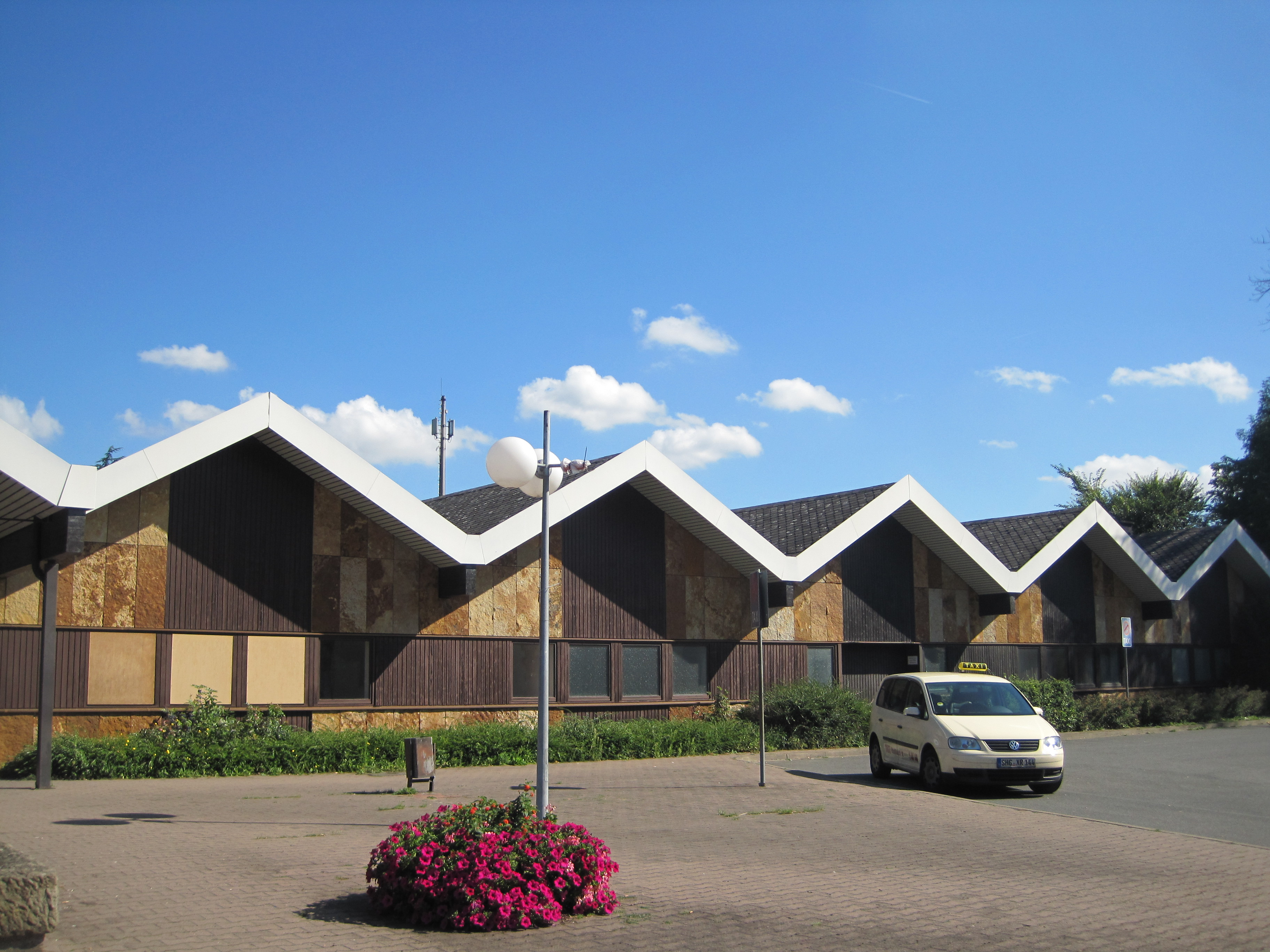

General information
- Location: Rinteln, Lower Saxony; Germany
- Coordinates: 52°11′56″N 9°04′40″E
- Lines: Elze–Löhne railway (KBS 372); Rinteln–Stadthagen railway (Heritage railway); Exter Valley Railway (closed)
- Platforms: 2

Construction
- Accessible: Yes

Other information
- Station code: 5289
- DS100 code: HRIN
- Category: 6
- Fare zone: VLS: Rinteln, Kernstadt (buses only); GVH: F (VLS transitional tariff, monthly passes only); Westfalentarif: 67590 (VLS transitional tariff)
- Website: www.bahnhof.de

History
- Opened: 1875

Passengers
- 500 (2010)

Services
Preceding station	Start	Following station
Vlotho towards Herford	RB 77	Hessisch Oldendorf towards Hildesheim Hbf
Location

Rinteln station is located on the Elze–Löhne railway in the town of Rinteln in the district of Schaumburg in the German state of Lower Saxony. The town lies on the Weser and is important for tourism. It is classified by Deutsche Bahn as a category 6 station.

It also served by heritage railway operations on the Rinteln–Stadthagen railway.

== History ==
The station was opened in 1875.

== Location and operations ==
Rinteln station is located north of town centre on the Weser Railway from Bünde and Löhne via Bad Oeynhausen Süd and Rinteln to Hildesheim and Bodenburg. The line is operated by NordWestBahn. In the 2026 timetable, the RB 77 line stops at the station:

Train class	Route	Frequency
RB 77	Weser-Bahn (Bünde (Westf) –) Löhne (Westf) – Rinteln – Hamelin – Elze – Nordstemmen – Hildesheim	Hourly

== Conditions ==
Since the carrying out of some restoration measures, the station has only two platform tracks next to an island platform, as well as a through track (next to the former home platform), which is used by the heritage trains. The much neglected and vacant building, which was built in 1978, was renovated in 2009. The island platform itself is accessed via an underpass built in 1910. Public transport tickets and tickets for selected long-distance services are available from vending machines on the platform.

Necessary renovation work was carried out on the platform as part of the economic stimulus package from August to October 2009.

At the station forecourt there is a bus station, a Park & Ride facility and the platform (Rinteln Nord) of the Rinteln–Stadthagen railway, which is operated by Dampfeisenbahn-Weserbergland e. V. (“steam railway of the Weser Uplands”, DEW) as a heritage railway. Until 1969, there was a direct connection through the town centre via the Exter Valley Railway (Extertalbahn) to Barntrup.

As part of the economic stimulus programs, the station has been renovated by DB Station&Service and modernised in many places. The focus of activities is on improving passenger information via a new dynamic display. Work was also carried out to improve the appearance of the station, to renovate wind and weather protection, to place new waste containers and to renew directional signs. Damaged areas on the platforms have been repaired and the pedestrian underpass and the entrance to the platform have been upgraded. The station building was sold for €47,000 in an auction in the autumn of 2013.
