= Bad Oeynhausen Süd station =

Railway station in Bad Oeynhausen, Germany

Bad Oeynhausen Süd
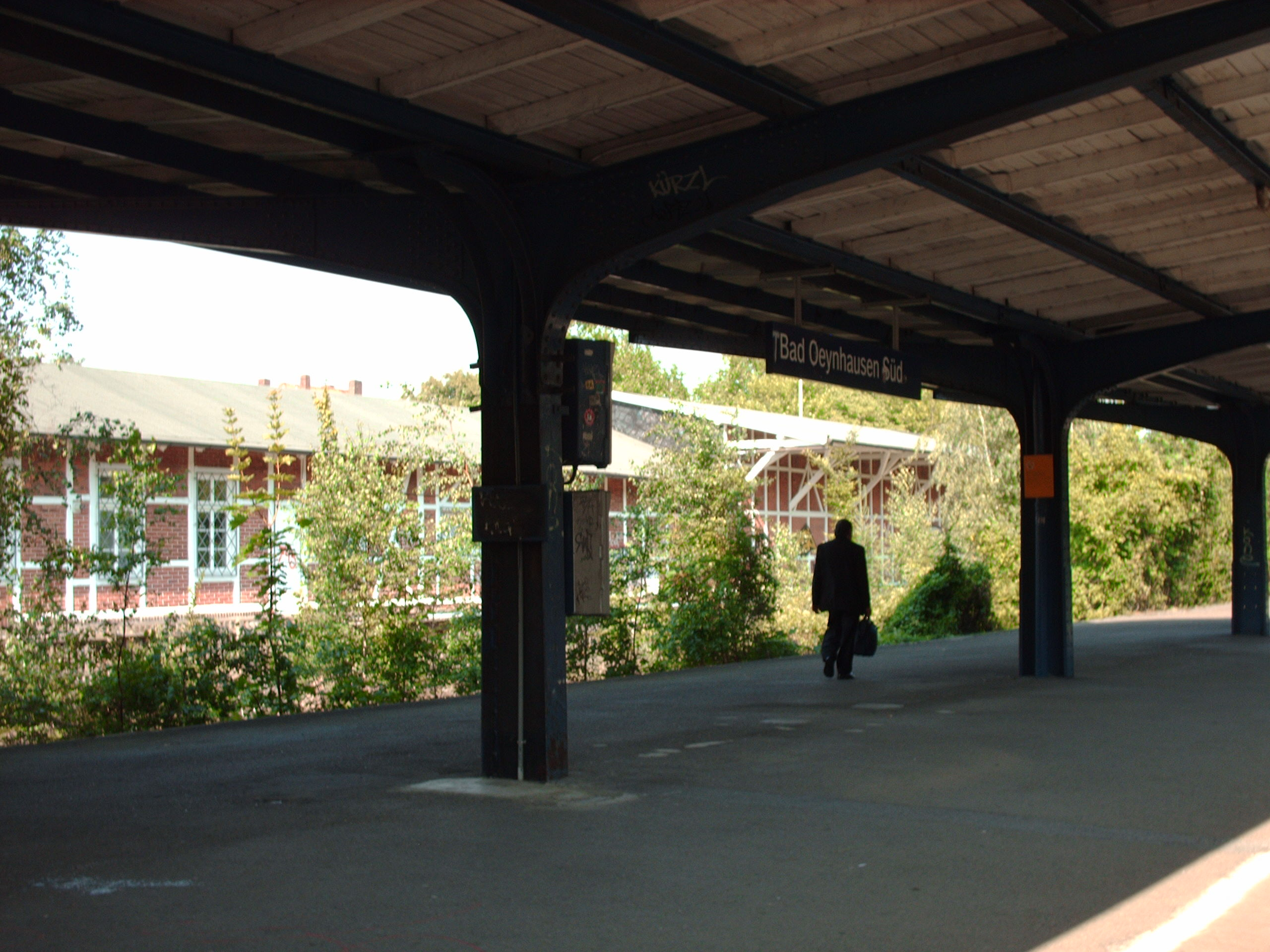

General information
- Location: Bad Oeynhausen, NRW; Germany
- Coordinates: 52°11′50″N 8°48′8″E
- Lines: Elze–Löhne railway (KBS 372)
- Platforms: 1

Construction
- Accessible: Yes

Other information
- Station code: 0316
- DS100 code: HBOE
- Category: 6
- Fare zone: Westfalentarif: 63211
- Website: www.bahnhof.de

History
- Opened: 1875

Services
Preceding station	Start	Following station
Löhne towards Herford	RB 77	Vlotho towards Hildesheim Hbf
Location

Bad Oeynhausen Süd (south) station is located in the Westphalian spa town of Bad Oeynhausen in Minden-Lübbecke in the German state of North Rhine-Westphalia. It is on the Elze–Löhne railway and is classified by Deutsche Bahn as a category 6 station.

== Conditions ==
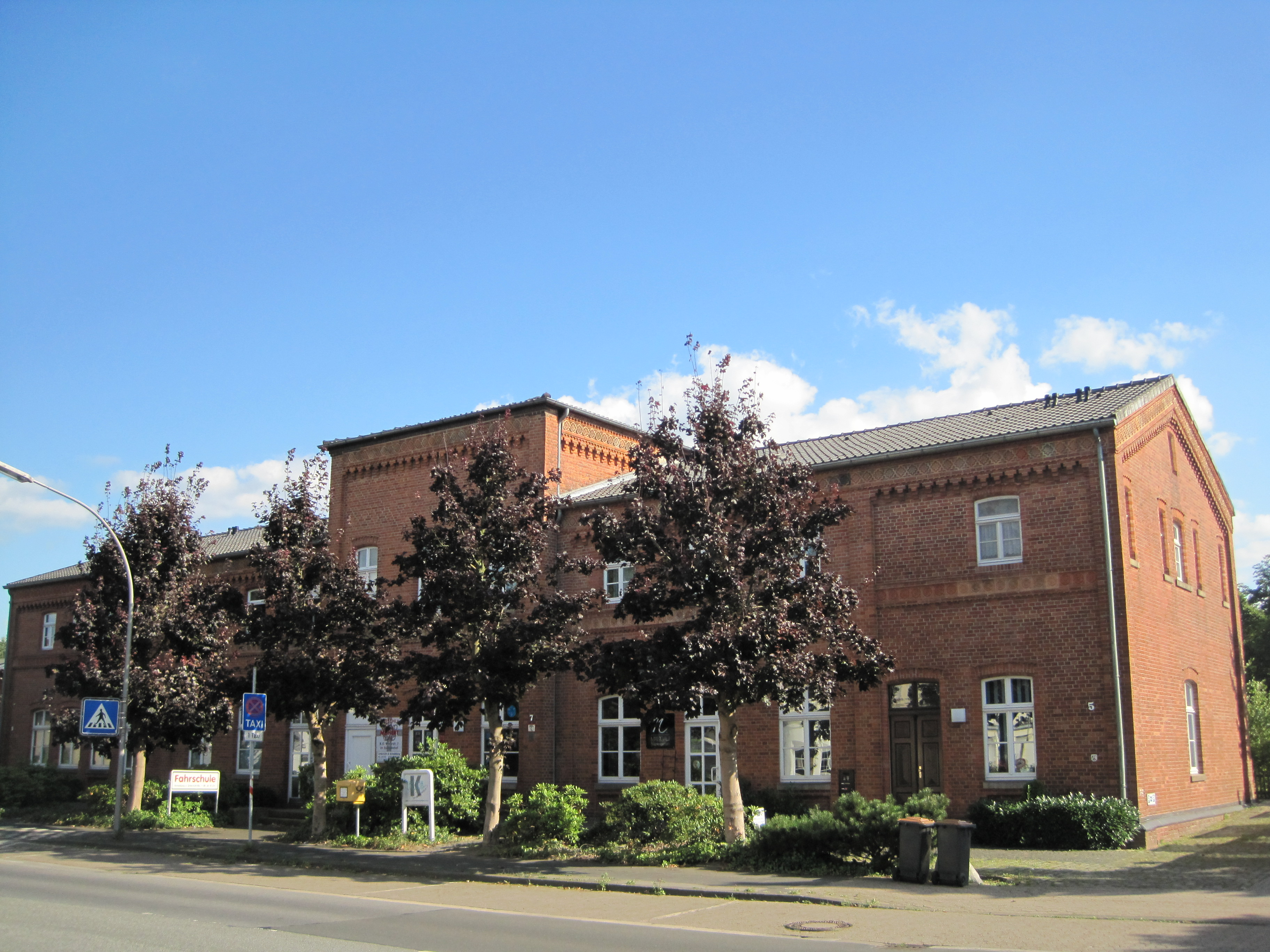
Former station building

Bad Oeynhausen Süd station is located south of the town centre and the spa park. Bad Oeynhausen station, colloquially referred to as the Nordbahnhof (north station) or Hauptbahnhof (main station) is connected by the 800 metre-long Bahnhofstrasse (station street). It is located in the neighbourhood of the North Rhine-Westphalia Heart and Diabetes Centre of the Ruhr University Bochum, the local site of the Mühlen district hospitals (Mühlenkreiskliniken) as well as the Bali-Therme thermal spa.

The station was regularly used by long-distance traffic from the beginning of the 20th century to the 1970s. After some restoration work, it has only one platform on a through track and it is thus formally classified as a Haltepunkt (halt). The platform is accessible for the disabled. The underpass that previously connected to another platform was closed. The grade II heritage-listed former station building now houses various service providers.

The station is linked with the southern part of the town and Lohe via Weserstraße and Detmolder Straße. Because the town’s bus service is focused on Bad Oeynhausen station and the central bus station there are no direct bus connections at the south station.

== Operations ==
The station is served hourly by Regionalbahn service RB 77, called the Weser-Bahn, (Bünde–Löhne–Rinteln–Hamelin–Hildesheim Hbf–Bodenburg). It is operated by Start, using Alstom Coradia LINT diesel railcars.

Train class	Route	Frequency
RB 77	Weser-Bahn; Löhne (Westf) – Bad Oeynhausen Süd – Hamelin – Elze – Nordstemmen – Hildesheim	Hourly

The station is covered by Der Sechser ("the six") fares of the Zweckverband Verkehrsverbund OWL (Ostwestfalen-Lippe transport association), which are valid as far as Rinteln, which is just into Lower Saxony. The Niedersachsen-Ticket of Lower Saxony is also valid to Vlotho.
