= Nordstemmen station =

Railway station in Nordstemmen, Germany

Nordstemmen
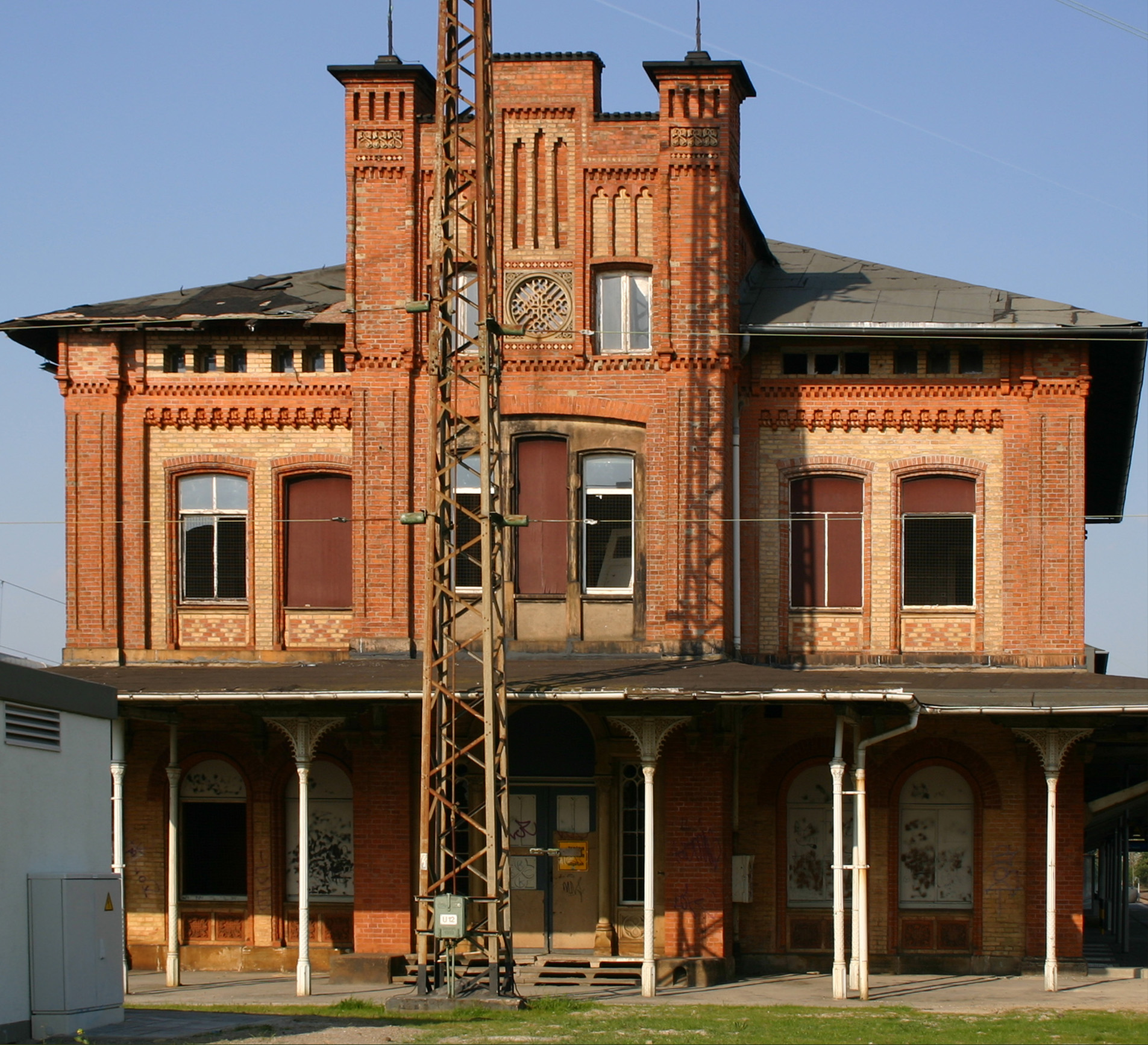
- The station building in April 2007

General information
- Location: Hauptstraße 138, Nordstemmen, Lower Saxony; Germany
- Coordinates: 52°10′2″N 9°47′24″E
- Lines: Hannover–Göttingen (26.5 km/16.5 mi) (KBS 350); Lehrte–Nordstemmen (52.2 km/32.4 mi) (KBS 372)
- Platforms: 4

Construction
- Accessible: Yes
- Architect: Conrad Wilhelm Hase

Other information
- Station code: 4581
- DS100 code: HNOS
- IBNR: 8000282
- Category: 5
- Fare zone: ROSA: 150 (buses only); GVH: D (ROSA transitional tariff, monthly passes only)
- Website: www.bahnhof.de

History
- Opened: 1853

Passengers
- 2,500

Services
Preceding station	Metronom	Following station
Elze (Han) towards Göttingen	RE 2	Barnten towards Uelzen
Preceding station	Start	Following station
Elze (Han) towards Herford	RB 77	Emmerke towards Hildesheim Hbf
Location

Nordstemmen station is located on the Hanover–Göttingen railway and the Hildesheim–Löhne railway in the town of Nordstemmen in the German state of Lower Saxony. The station building, constructed by Conrad Wilhelm Hase between 1853 and 1854, has not been used by Deutsche Bundesbahn nor Deutsche Bahn since 1977. Since 2011, the Hildesheim contractor Dirk Bettels has tried in vain to acquire and rehabilitate the grade II heritage-listed station building with public funds. Construction work begun by Dirk Bettels was discontinued at the end of March 2013 because no contract had been signed by Deutsche Bahn.

== Location ==
The station is on the Hanover–Göttingen railway and the Hildesheim–Löhne railway, which share the same route between Nordstemmen and Elze. The Hanoverian Southern Railway was opened for traffic from Hanover via Nordstemmen to Alfeld from 1 May 1853 and the line from Nordstemmen to Hildesheim was opened by the Royal Hanoverian State Railways on 15 September 1853. After the opening of the Weser Railway from Elze to Löhne by the Hanover-Altenbeken Railway Company (Hannover-Altenbekener Eisenbahn-Gesellschaft, HAE) for freight on 19 May 1875 and for passenger traffic on 30 June 1875, there were through trains on the Hildesheim–Hameln–Löhne route. The HAE built a second track between Elze and Hildesheim to handle the additional traffic. On 1 January 1880, this line was nationalised by the Prussian government, which had taken over the Hanoverian State Railways after the War of 1866. A railway ran from Nordstemmen station to Rössing and through the town of Lauenstadt to the Calenberg mill in Schulenburg. The Nordstemmen sugar mill founded in 1865 was also connected by its own siding to Nordstemmen station.

In 1896, there was a plan for the building of a 22.3-kilometre-long (13.9 mi) metre-gauge railway from Nordstemmen via Barnten, Schulenburg, Adensen, Hallerburg, Alferde, Eldagsen and Alvesrode to Springe, which would serve both passenger and freight transport. The narrow-gauge railway was to carry 100,000 passengers and 30,000 tonnes (66 million pounds) of freight (including sugar beet for the Nordstemmen sugar mill). The construction of the narrow-gauge railway failed because of the opposition of the town of Eldagsen and its farmers who wanted no railway in their town.

Since the opening of the Hanover–Würzburg high-speed railway, on a different route, in 1991, through passenger traffic has greatly reduced at Nordstemmen station. Today, hourly trains are operated on the line between Hanover and Göttingen by Metronom (ME), and apart from freight trains, there are also some Deutsche Bahn Intercity trains running through Nordstemmen station. With the great increase of freight transport since 2006, significantly more freight trains can be expected to run in the future. NordWestBahn runs hourly passenger trains on the Hildesheim–Hamelin line.

== Station area ==
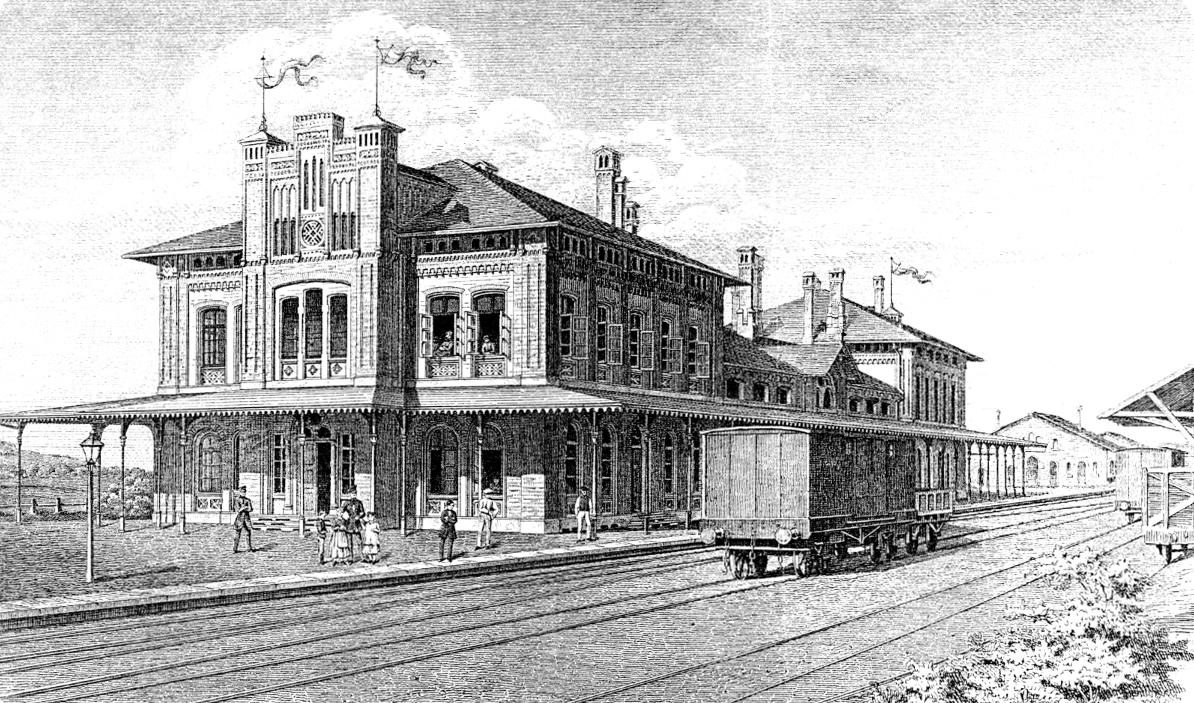
View of Nordstemmen station in 1861. Drawing of Julius Rasch.

The station was built north of the former farming village of Nordstemmen on the road to Rössing. The tracks ran past the village to the west towards Elze. There were four unprotected crossings south of the station area in 1853, enabling access to the Nordstemmer Holz riparian forest to the west and from there over a rope bridge, which no longer exists, to Schulenburg. The road that is now called district road K 505 was built to Adensen in 1935.

Nordstemmen station was initially opened as a through station on the Hanoverian Southern Railway from Hanover via Nordstemmen to Alfeld on 1 May 1853. With the opening of the line from Nordstemmen to Hildesheim by the Royal Hanoverian State Railways on 15 September 1853, the station became a railway junction, with the station building built on the wedge between the lines (German: Keilbahnhof) on an island between rail tracks without direct access to the street. The railway at that time carried in addition to passengers and checked baggage, freight, mail, parcels and telegrams. A station on an island was considered an advantage in 1853 as all trains could stop next to the entrance building on a single central platform and luggage could be loaded and unloaded between the entrance building and the trains without crossing tracks.

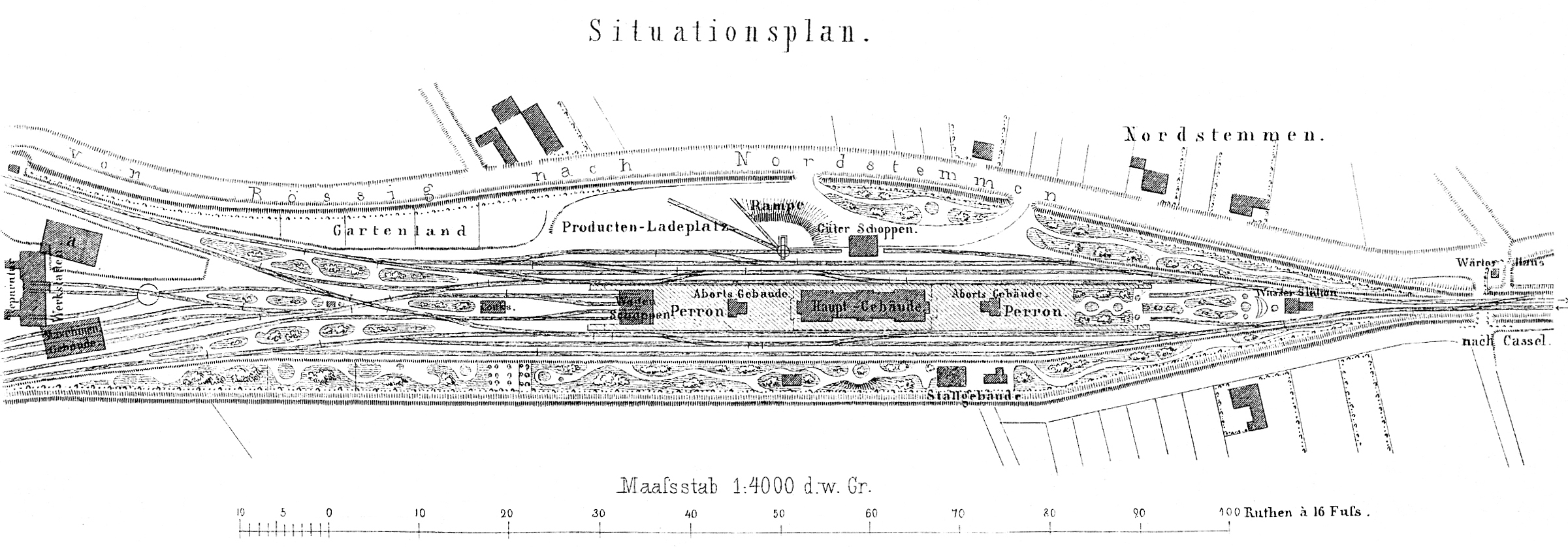
Map of station Nordstemmen in 1861. This was part of the railway network of the Kingdom of Hanover.

In 1853, the station consisted of several buildings that were surrounded by tracks. The access to the station ran over the tracks and was blocked by a barrier; next to it there was a crossing keeper's house. Passengers were able to drive from the station to their destination by carriage.

The station was expanded with numerous buildings. It was a major employer for Nordstemmen: a stationmaster, a cashier, a trainee, three telegraph operators, a storeroom manager, two wagon personnel, two loadmasters, a porter, seven shunting personnel and an assistant worked at the station in 1878.

Nordstemmen had five sheep pens and was the destination of shepherds and sheep dealers who even travelled by train from the Netherlands to stay there and to buy or sell sheep. At the station's loading ramp there were brick stalls. When its gates were pulled up, the sheep ran from them via ramps directly into the wagons.

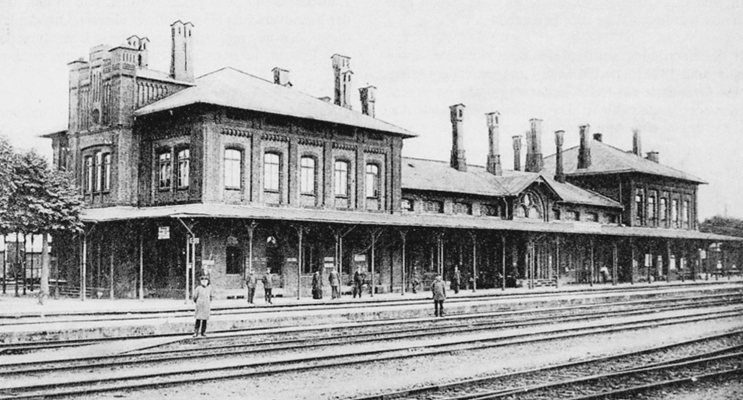
Historic photograph of the station building about 1861

In 1870, the tracks were crossed to the north by the railway crossing leading to the sugar factory and on the south by the railway crossing on Marienbergstraße. In 1871, there was an ice house on the east side of the railway tracks for the station restaurant.

Many railway workers took up residence in Nordstemmen and the farming village was extended to the station.

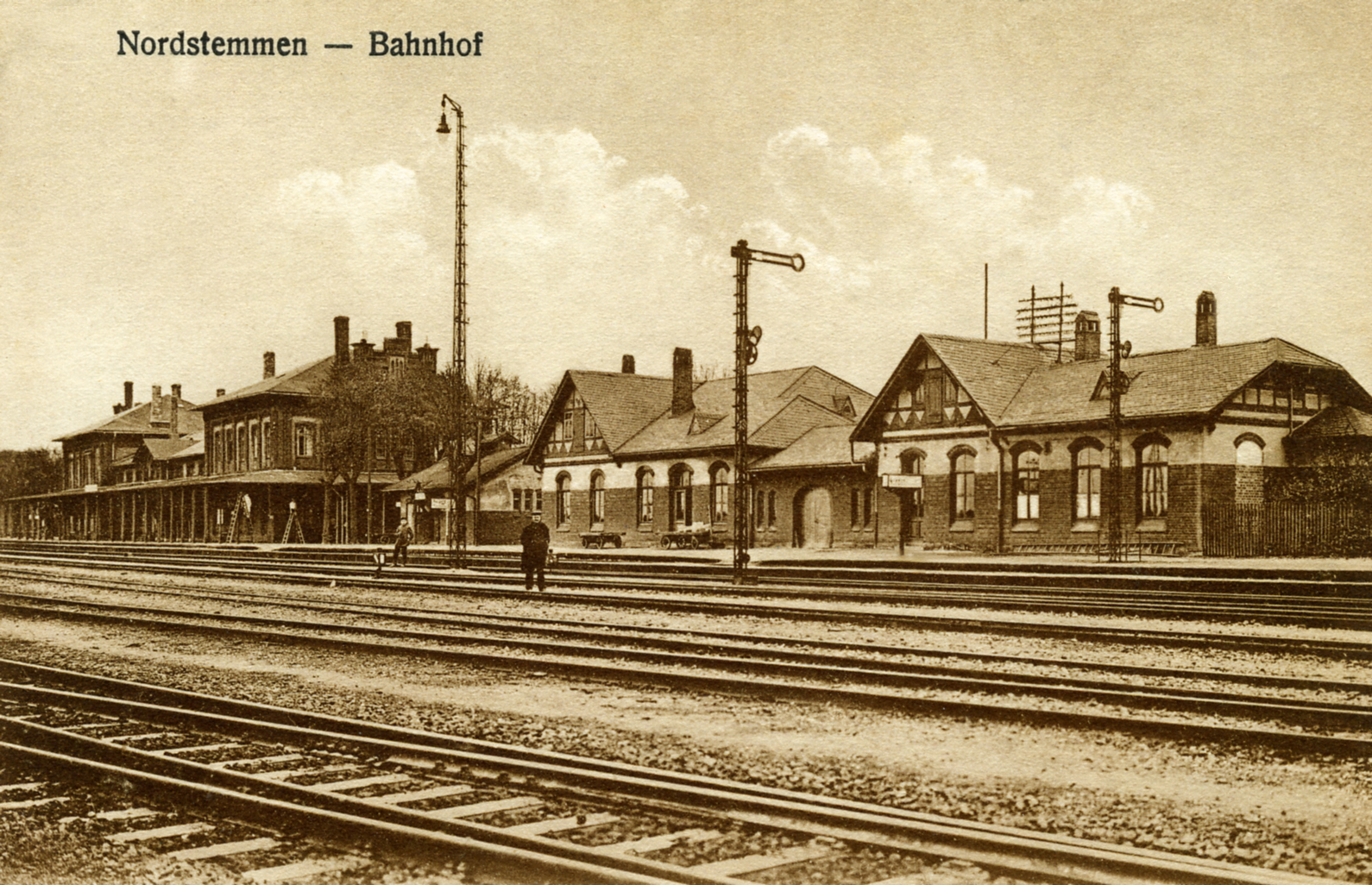
View after 1908 from the west to Nordstemmen station: the postcard shows from left to right, the entrance building, the toilet block and the southern carriage house.

The former König Georgs V. von Hannover carriage house was built to the north of the entrance building in the wedge between the railway tracks. This carriage house has been preserved. It was used for the operations of Deutsche Bahn and on the north side of the building there is a parking area with an entrance from the L 410.

Between 1905 and 1908 an elongated carriage house was built to the south of the station premises replacing a smaller wagon shed, of which the northern part was used for the dispatch of express freight and the southern part used for mail handling. This carriage house has been preserved and is a heritage-listed building. At the end of the 20th century, the northern part of the building was initially used for the sale of tickets and then as a waiting room until the depot was closed completely. The area of the carriage house has not been accessible to the public since 2007. In 2012 and 2013, the depot has been renovated under the Quaß training scheme (which provides training and work for the unemployed instead of social benefits) and converted into a workshop for the renovation of the entrance building.

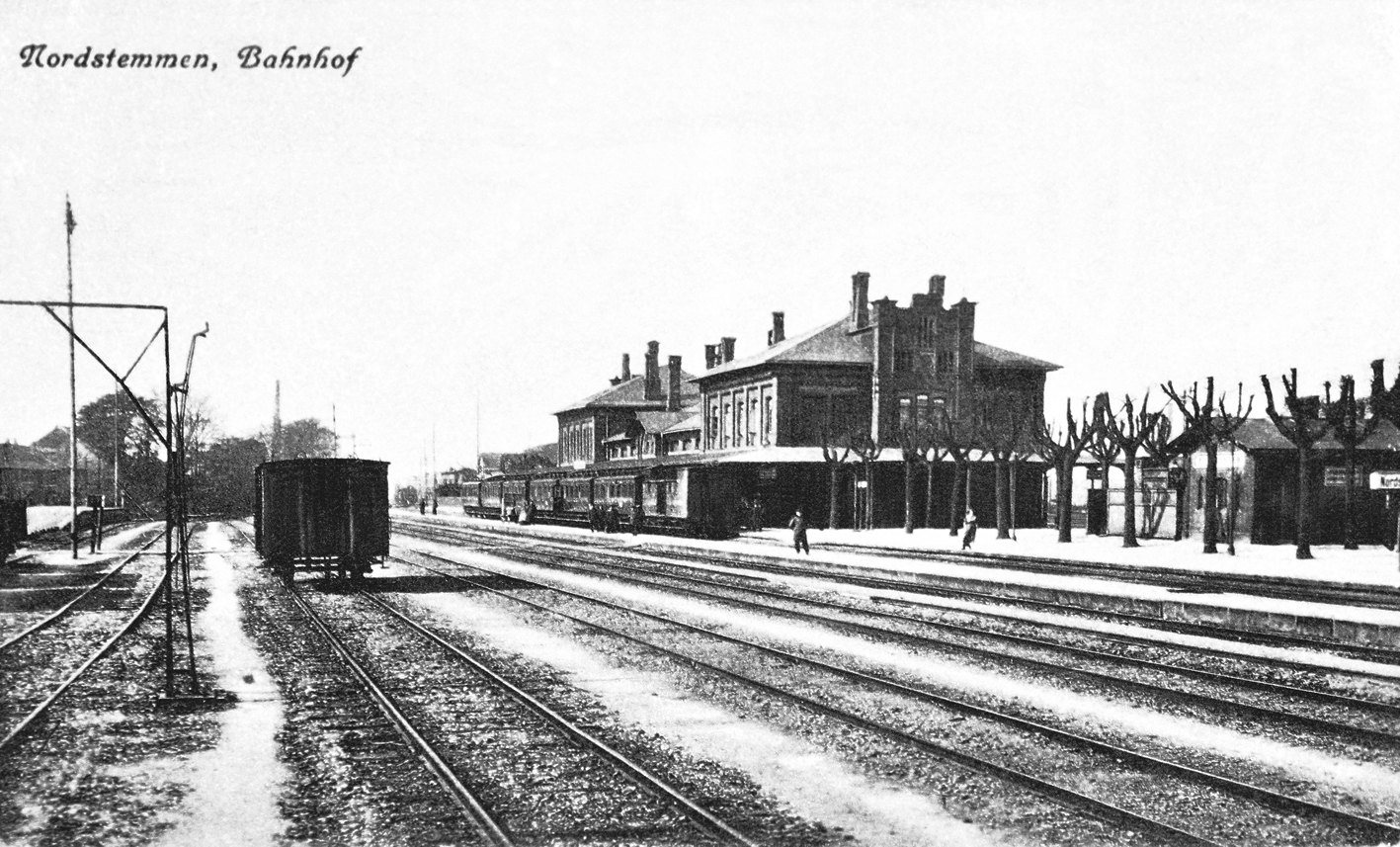
View in about 1915 from the east to Nordstemmen station.

This carriage house and the station building were accessible until 1914 from the main road via a level crossing controlled by barrier to the south of the carriage house. Since 1914, there has also been a tunnel that enables safe access to the carriage house, to the toilet block and the entrance building.

Until about 1970, the business centre of Nordstemmen was on the main street (now highway L 410), it then shifted to new residential areas in the town centre and in the south-east of Nordstemmen.

Between 1961 and 1963, catenary masts were installed in Nordstemmen for the electrification of the North–South railway. The electric train began running between Hanover to Eichenberg on 26 May 1963 and from Nordstemmen via Hildesheim to Lehrte on 29 May 1965.

Up to 420 trains ran through the station daily in 1980. This caused long waiting times at the level crossing gates. These were replaced in 1981 to 1982 by an overpass for district road K 505 to Adensen and a pedestrian tunnel to the southern entrance to the station.

The station site was last rebuilt in 2006 for €3.8 million. The new platforms on tracks 1, 2 and 3 are 76 centimetres (30 in) high and 190 metres (620 ft) long and the platform on track 11 is 55 centimetres (22 in) high and 90 metres (300 ft) long. Thus the platforms correspond to the vehicles used on the lines and allow entries and exits to the modern rolling stock that are easy and accessible for the disabled. The platforms were given a new tactile floor covering for the visually impaired, transparent weather-proof shelters and modern facilities with benches, cabinets and bins. New speaker systems and lighting, radio-controlled clocks, destination displays and a new signage system complete the renewal. The station received ramps for the disabled and a tunnel surfacing at Hauptstraße (main street). In parallel with the work carried out by Deutsche Bahn, the Nordstemmen municipality has spent around €4.3 million to pave the former freight train tracks next to Hauptstraße in order to established a park-and-ride facility, a for bicycle parking and for a bus stop. The parking facility is accessed via a pedestrian tunnel to the platforms. The grant of the land worth around €3 million was made for this work. The state has funded about €5.5 million of the total cost of about €8 million.

There are transfer-free connections to Hanover, Göttingen, Hildesheim/Bodenburg and towards Hamelin and Löhne. In 2006, about 2,500 travellers daily used local and long-distance services at Nordstemmen station, according to Deutsche Bahn.

== Rail services ==
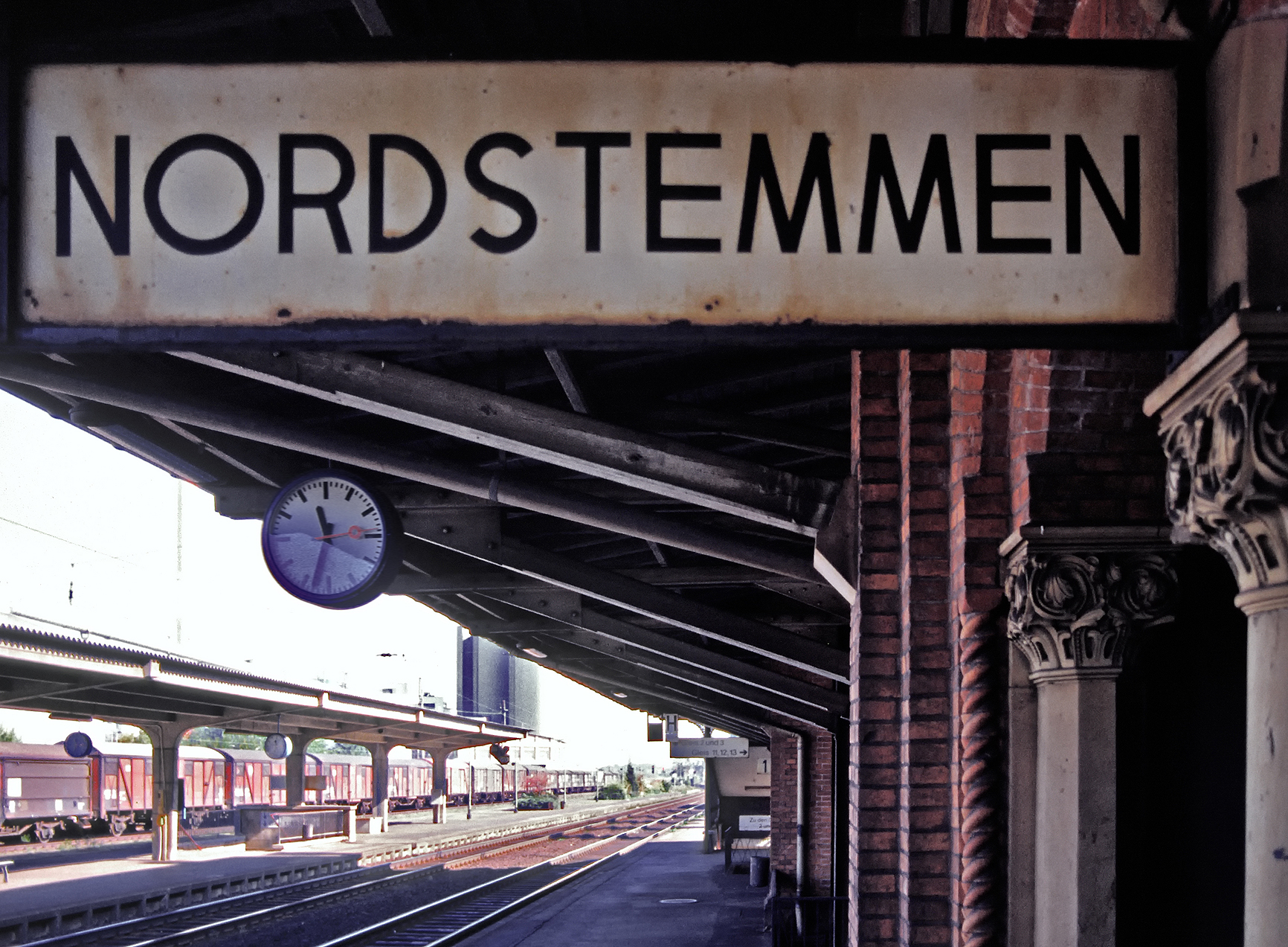
Platform 1 in September 1993.

Nordstemmen station is located north of town centre on the Weser Railway from Bünde and Löhne via Bad Oeynhausen Süd and Rinteln to Hildesheim and Bodenburg. The line is operated by NordWestBahn. Trains run hourly on week days and every two hours on weekends.

The station is served by the following services:

- Regional services RE 2 Uelzen - Celle - Hannover - Barnten - Elze - Kreiensen – Northeim - Göttingen
- Local services RB 77 Herford - Löhne - Hamelin – Northeim - Hildesheim

In addition, freight trains pass through the station in the north–south direction. Since 2012 there have been discussions on running freight trains in the future in the east–west direction south of Hanover to relieve lines north of Hanover of freight. This freight would then pass through the stations of Elze and Nordstemmen towards Hildesheim.

== Reception building and its planned renovation ==
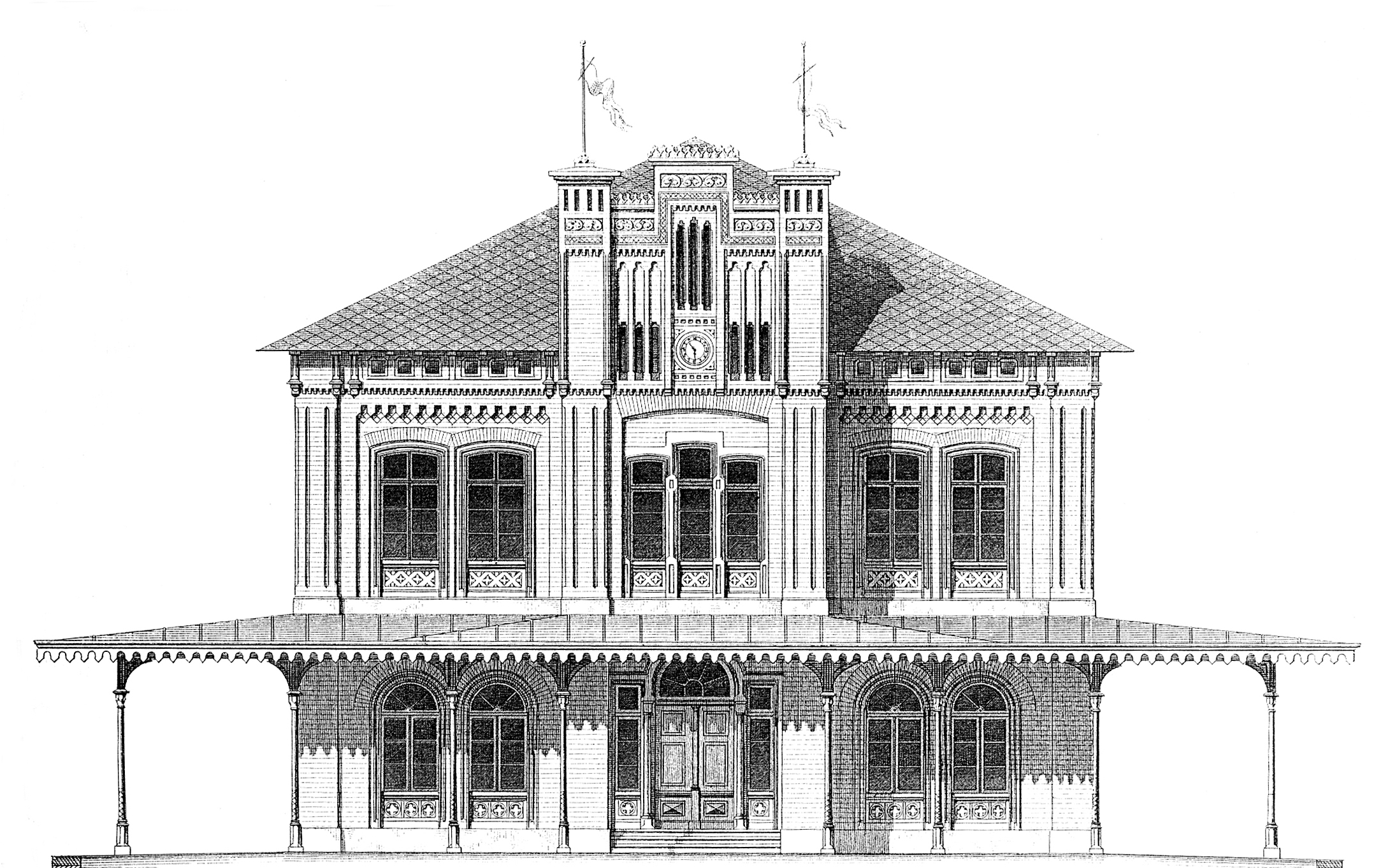
The area allocated for the king was the southern corner pavilion of the station building. Drawing of Conrad Wilhelm Hase.

The station building was originally built from 1853 to 1854 by the building manager Bahr to the design of the architect Julius Rasch and later by the architect Conrad Wilhelm Hase. Rasch at the time was the director of works of the Royal Hanoverian State Railways.

Hase planned the entrance building in a mixture of medieval Brick Romanesque and Brick Gothic architecture in an historicist style. He used bricks in multiple colours with the primary colours of red and yellow. The floor plan of the building is designed to be symmetrical on the longitudinal axis and the transverse axes.

A broad one-storey central block with a gable roof on a rectangular plan is bounded on the north and south by larger multi-storey corner pavilions with a tent roof on a square plan. The two corner pavilions have protruding shop facades on their front sides and 12-metre-high (39 ft) blind gables that are surrounded by pillars and towers that extend beyond the gables. Overall, the station building has a length of 63.38 metres (207.9 ft), a width of 15.8 metres (52 ft), a surface area of 1,080 square metres (11,600 sq ft) and a construction volume of 12,000 cubic metres (420,000 cu ft).

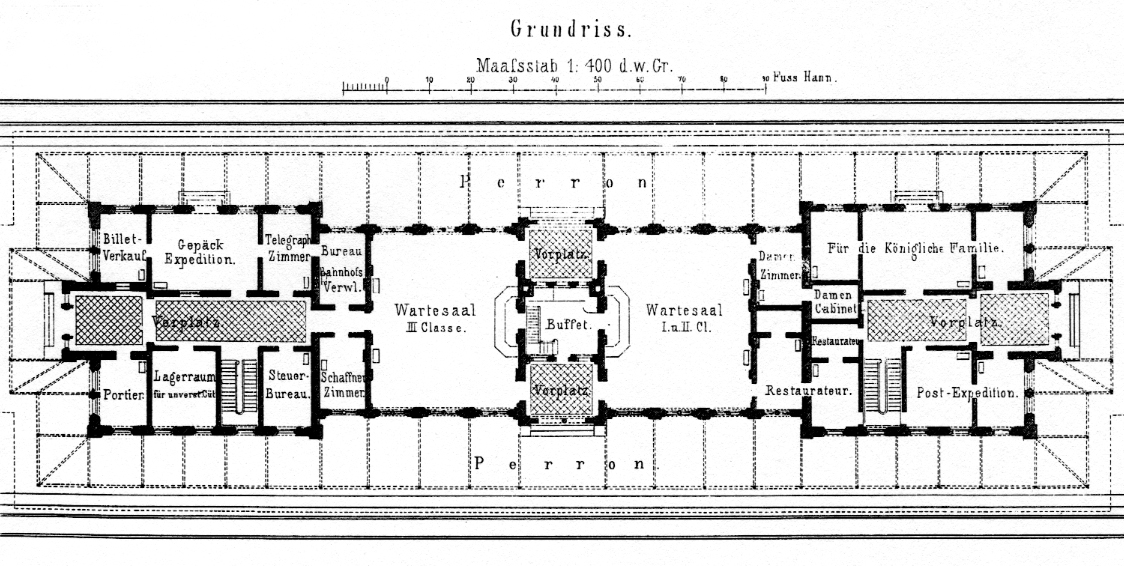
Floor plan of the entrance building with indications of the use of the station building in 1861, published by Adolf Funk in 1861.

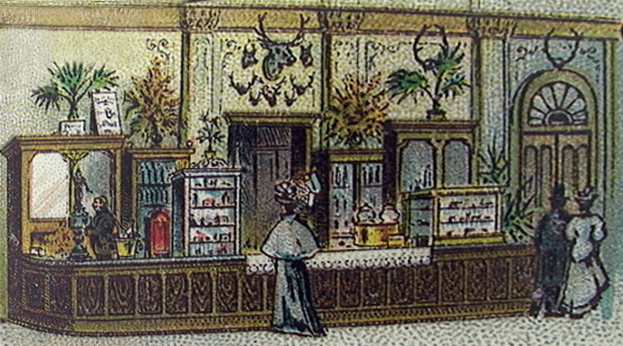
The neo-Gothic third class waiting room in the station building designed by Hase about 1900

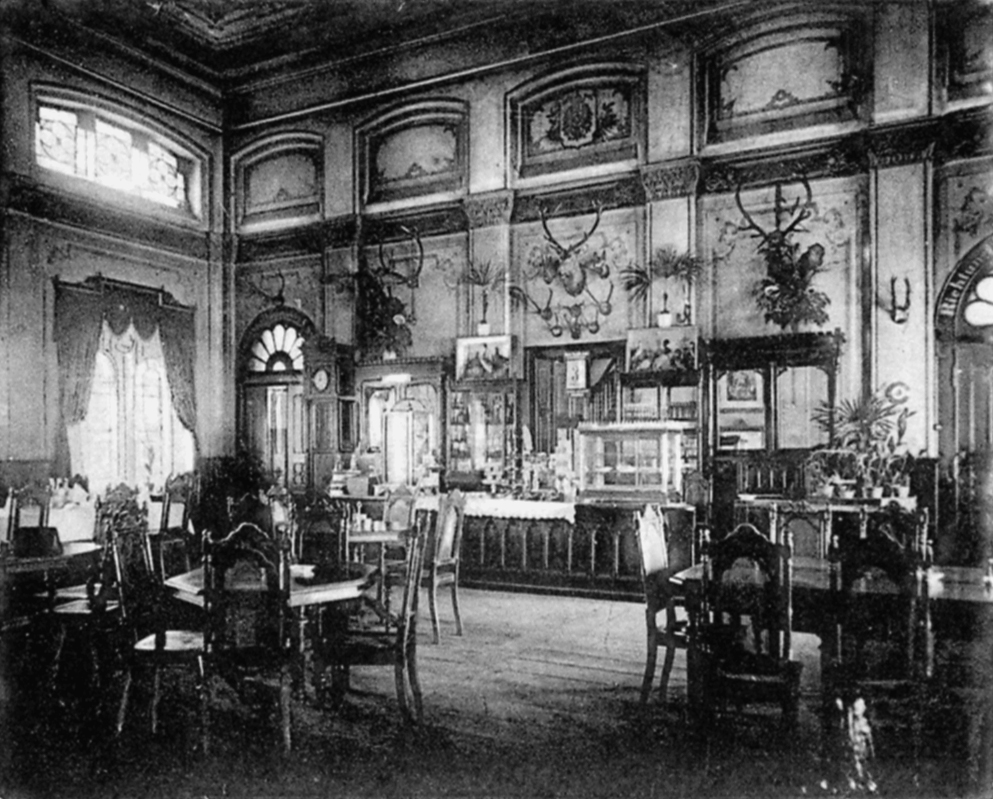
The neo-Gothic first and second class waiting room in the station building designed by Hase in 1914

In 1977, Deutsche Bundesbahn moved its offices into the Elze station. The station building was no longer needed and it was closed to passengers in 1988. The furnishings, the windows and the original glass is no longer available.

In 2000, the distinctive chimneys that shaped the image of the station building were removed because of the danger of collapse. The windows and doors were blocked with chipboard to prevent vandalism. In July 2001, a fire was lit in the middle part of the building. Only parts of the roof were destroyed.

In 2002 and 2003 the building from surveyed for its physical integrity and the degree of damage it had suffered. It was found that the conservation status of the building had been affected by the spread of Serpula lacrymans (dry rot), causing serious deterioration to the roof and other parts of the wooden structure; almost the whole building is affected. Subsequently, the previously closed windows were fitted with grills, supporting the ceilings, which were in danger of collapsing, and new coverings were installed over the roof. Because no buyer had been found for the listed building, Deutsche Bahn submitted an application for its demolition to the Federal Railway Authority (EBA) in Hanover in the summer of 2005. Deutsche Bahn undertook to build a modern station after the planned demolition, sufficient for current purposes.

There has been much discussion of preserving and reusing the station building, but no agreement has been reached and it is still expected to be demolished.
