= Hanover–Altenbeken railway =

Railway line in Germany

Overview
- Line number: 1760
- Locale: Lower Saxony, North Rhine-Westphalia, Germany

Service
- Route number: 363.4.5 (formerly 212, then 360); 361.2 (Hanover–Weetzen)

Technical
- Line length: 110.9 km (68.9 mi)
- Number of tracks: 2
- Track gauge: 1,435 mm (4 ft 8 1/2 in) standard gauge
- Electrification: 15 kV/16.7 Hz AC overhead catenary

The Hanover–Altenbeken railway is a two-track electrified main line in the German states of Lower Saxony and North Rhine-Westphalia. It is now a part of the Hanover S-Bahn network.

== History ==
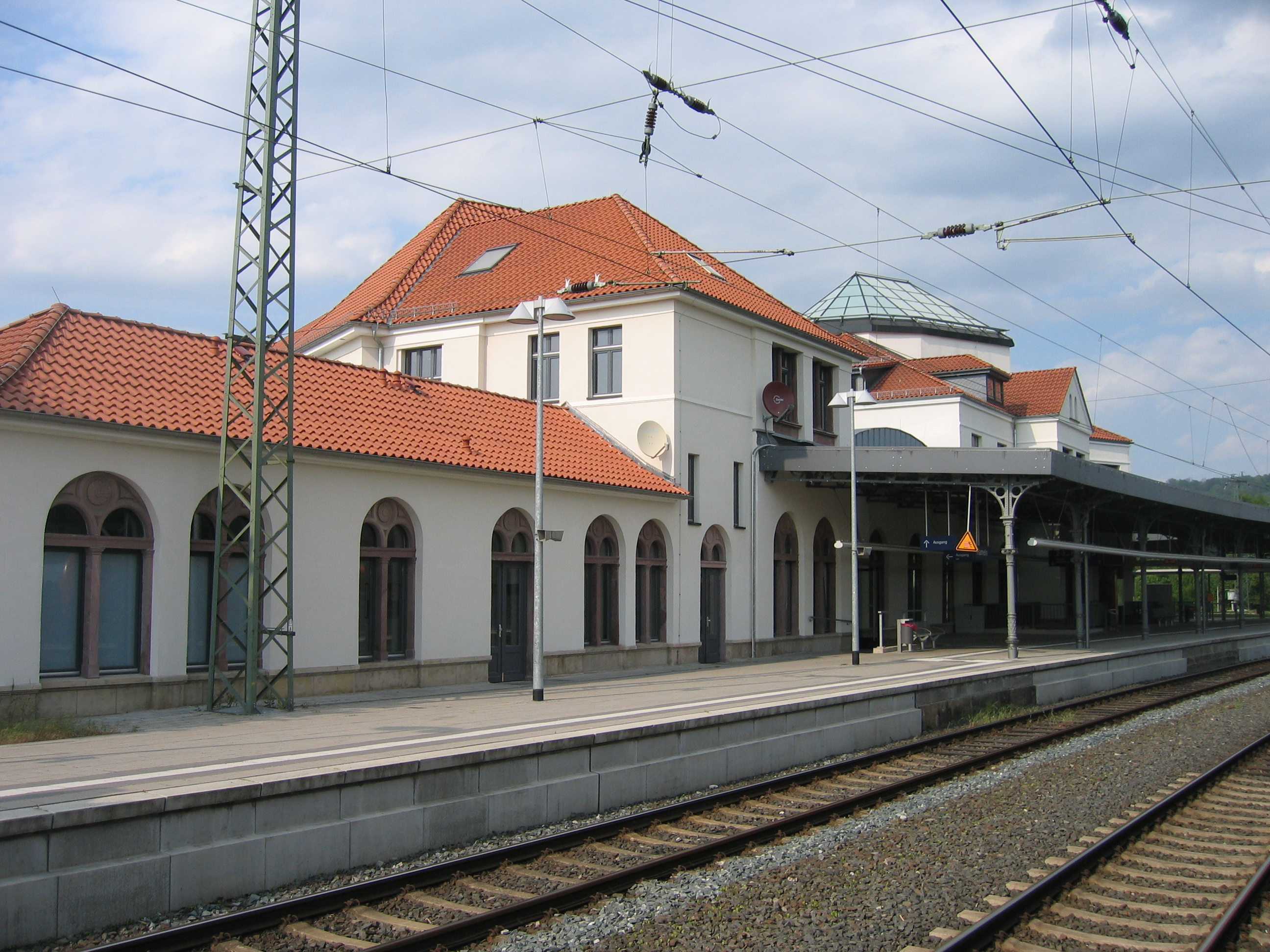
Hamelin station

The railway line was built by the Hanover-Altenbeken Railway Company (German: Hannover-Altenbekener Eisenbahn-Gesellschaft, HAE). The first section opened to Hamelin on 13 April 1872 and the whole Hanover–Altenbeken line was completed on 19 December 1872. After the financial decline of the HAE, it was nationalised in 1880 and operated as part of the Prussian state railways. The originally single-track line was duplicated between Hamelin and Altenbeken in 1908 and between Hannover and Hamelin in 1913. As a result of the division of Germany after 1945 it lost freight traffic, which had been important for decades, because traffic shifted to the north–south direction. Electrical operations commenced on the line in the summer of 1971.

The original starting point was Hannover Localbahnhof (local station), later called Südbahnhof (south station), north of Bismarckstraße that had a connection to the railway yards at Pferdeturm, now used for sidings, which gave a further connection to the line to Lehrte and Brunswick. From 1880 trains operated from the newly built Hannover Hauptbahnhof. In southern Hanover the line ran along the street today called Altenbekener Damm to Linden/Fischerhof station. The current route, which continues further south, was opened on 26 June 1909 as part of the Hanover freight train bypass. The former railway bridges over the Leine and the Ihme are still preserved as pedestrian bridges.

The branch line was opened in 1873 from Linden to Linden-Küchengarten, which was used mainly for coal from the Deister. The line was closed in 1930.

The original Holtensen b. Weetzen station was renamed at the beginning of the 21st century as Holtensen/Linderte.

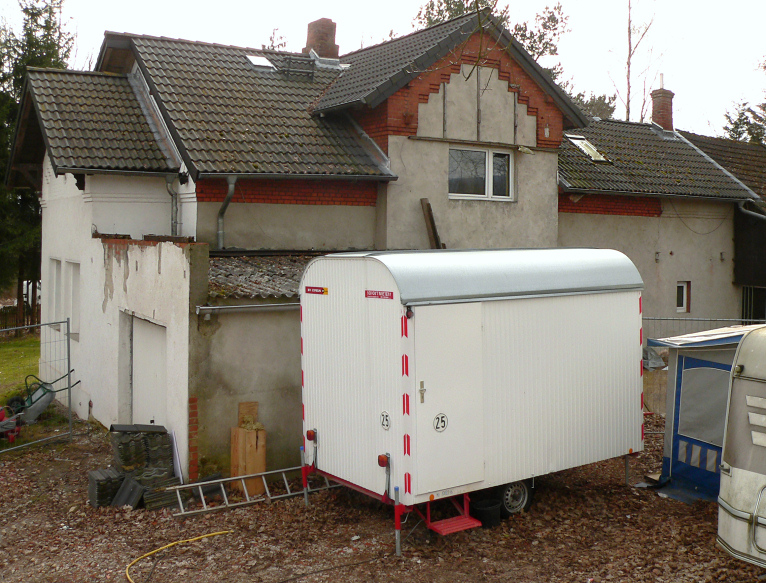
Former Kaiserrampe station near Springe

It was originally proposed that the line between Springe and Bennigsen would run further south to directly serve Eldagsen, which was larger at that time than Springe. Since this route was not selected, Eldagsen station was built just outside Völksen, largely financed by Eldagsen. The station and Eldagsen were connected by buses, initially horse-hauled. In 1935 the station was renamed Eldagsen-Völksen. In about 2000, the station was renamed as Völksen-Eldagsen.

Kaiserrampe (Emperor platform) station was opened between Völksen/Eldagsen and Springe (west of the present bridge over the B 217) in 1887. From there, the Emperor rode over the 2.5 km long and chestnut-lined Kaiserallee (Emperor's Alley) to a hunting lodge in Saupark Springe, a game reserve. The station was last used by the German Emperor in 1912. The Kaiserallee and the old station buildings still exist today.

It is planned to build stations in Hanover on the line at Waldhausen and Braunschweiger Platz to improve interchange with the Hanover Stadtbahn, but no definite dates have been set.

== Operations ==
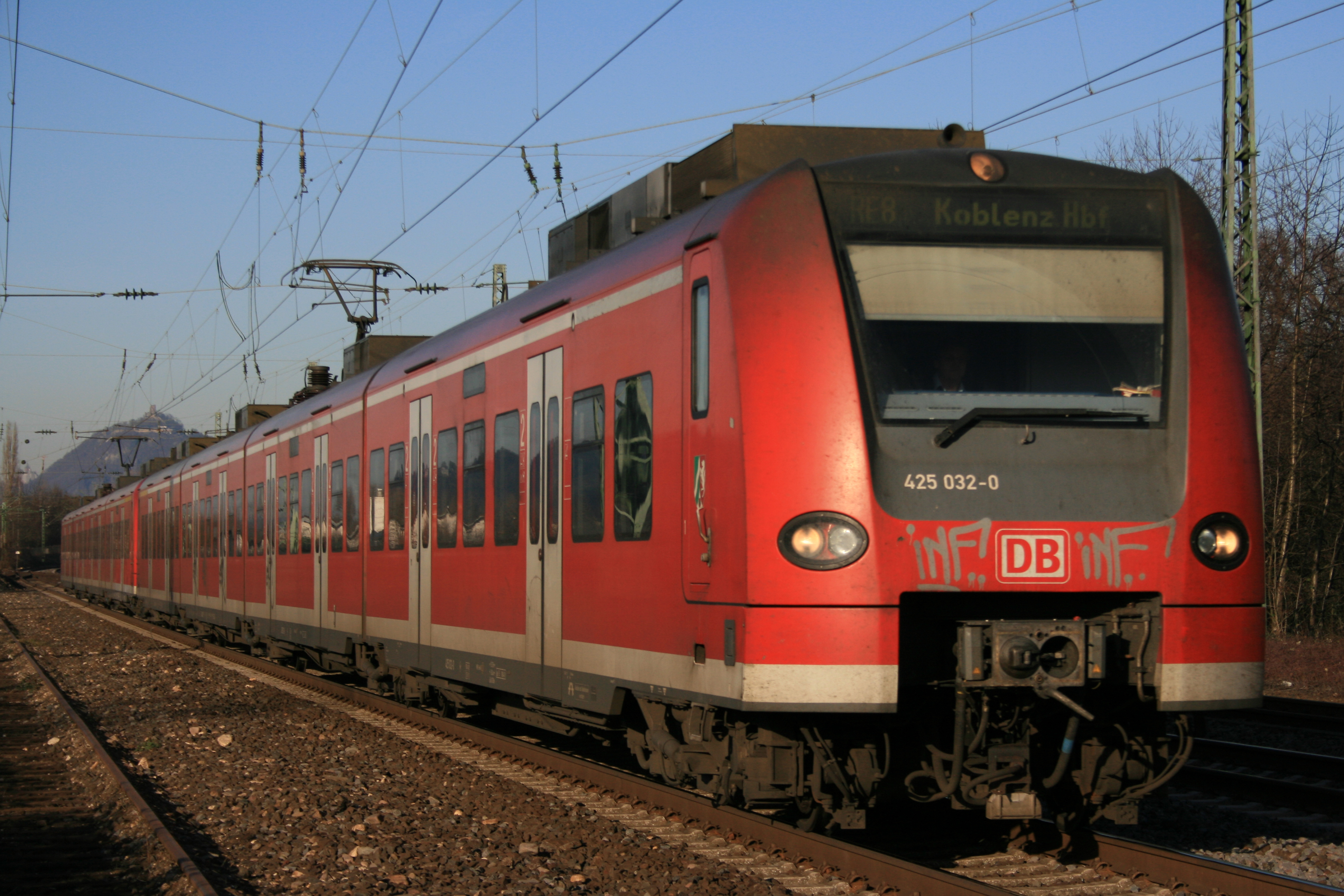
Class 425 electric multiple unit

Since 2000 the line has been part of the Hanover S-Bahn and since December 2004 it has been served by S-Bahn line S 5 on the Hanover Airport–Hannover Hbf–Hamelin–Altenbeken–Paderborn route. The trains run every hour, but on Sundays only every two hours between Bad Pyrmont and Paderborn. The frequency of services is improved by additional services at the Hanover end of the line: S 1 and S 2 operate on the line to Weetzen and additional S5 services operate between Hanover and Hamelin. They are operated by DB Regio Niedersachsen, using electric multiple units of DB classes 424 and 425 at speeds of up to 140 km/h. The average speed is 69 km/h.
