= Elze–Löhne railway =

Railway line in Germany

Overview
- Line number: 1820
- Locale: Lower Saxony and North Rhine-Westphalia, Germany

Service
- Route number: 372

Technical
- Line length: 85 km (53 mi)
- Number of tracks: 1 (formerly 2 between Hamelin and Löhne)
- Track gauge: 1,435 mm (4 ft 8 1/2 in) standard gauge
- Operating speed: 120 km/h (75 mph)

The Elze–Löhne railway is a non-electrified line from the town of Elze in the German state of Lower Saxony via Hamelin and Rinteln to Löhne in North Rhine-Westphalia. It runs between the Weser and the Weser hills from Hamelin to Bad Oeynhausen and as a result this section is also called the Weser Railway (German: Weserbahn).

The line was previously part of the main route for freight from Berlin to Amsterdam via Hildesheim, Elze, Löhne, Osnabrück, Rheine and Almelo. In the 1990s and the 2000s, the formerly double-track main line was reduced to one track. The line can be operated at up to 120 km/h.

== History ==
The line from Elze to Löhne was taken in to operation by the Hanover-Altenbeken Railway Company (Hannover-Altenbekener Eisenbahn-Gesellschaft, HAE) for freight on 19 May 1875 and for passenger services on 30 June 1875. The HAE also planned a line from Hildesheim towards Vienenburg. Trains had been operated between Elze and Hildesheim since 1853 over the Hanoverian Southern Railway and the Hildesheim–Nordstemmen railway. The HAE was nationalised on 1 January 1880 and became part of the Prussian state railways, which had included the Hanover railways since 1866. The Hamelin–Löhne section was duplicated between 1908 and 1911.

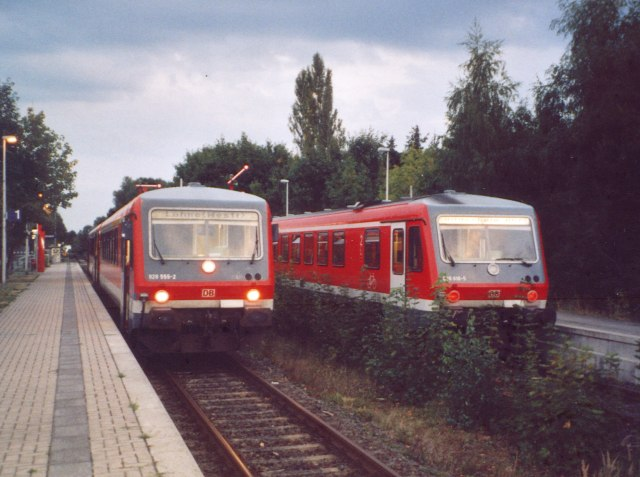
Meeting of two trains of class 628 in Hessisch Oldendorf in October 2003

The importance of the line declined partly because of changes in traffic after the Second World War. Numerous stations, especially between Hamelin and Vlotho were closed, some of which were significant for the current development of the Weser valley, such as in Fischbeck, Eisbergen and Veltheim. The line along the river Weser has been reduced to one track. Bad Oeynhausen Süd station was converted to a simple single-track halt and the underpass under the railway was closed.

=== Line as southern freight bypass of Hanover ===
In the course of preparation of the Federal Transport Infrastructure Plan (Bundesverkehrswegeplan) of 2003, the Federal Ministry of Transport, Building and Housing examined plans for duplicating the Brunswick–Hamelin–Löhne axis as a southern freight bypass of the Hanover rail node. As a result of this project was included as No. 7 in the list of first priority needs in the 2003 plan.

In the assessment of the needs in the federal railway plans that were published on 11 November 2010, the southern bypass of the node of Hanover via the Weser Railway was found to have a benefit-cost ratio of 2.5. Duplication and electrification of the line are proposed as a second phase of the construction of this project. There have been objections to these plans, for example in Bad Oeynhausen, where noise pollution is feared in the town. Due to the expected significant increase in railway noise, further resistance has developed in affected cities and communities.

== Operations ==
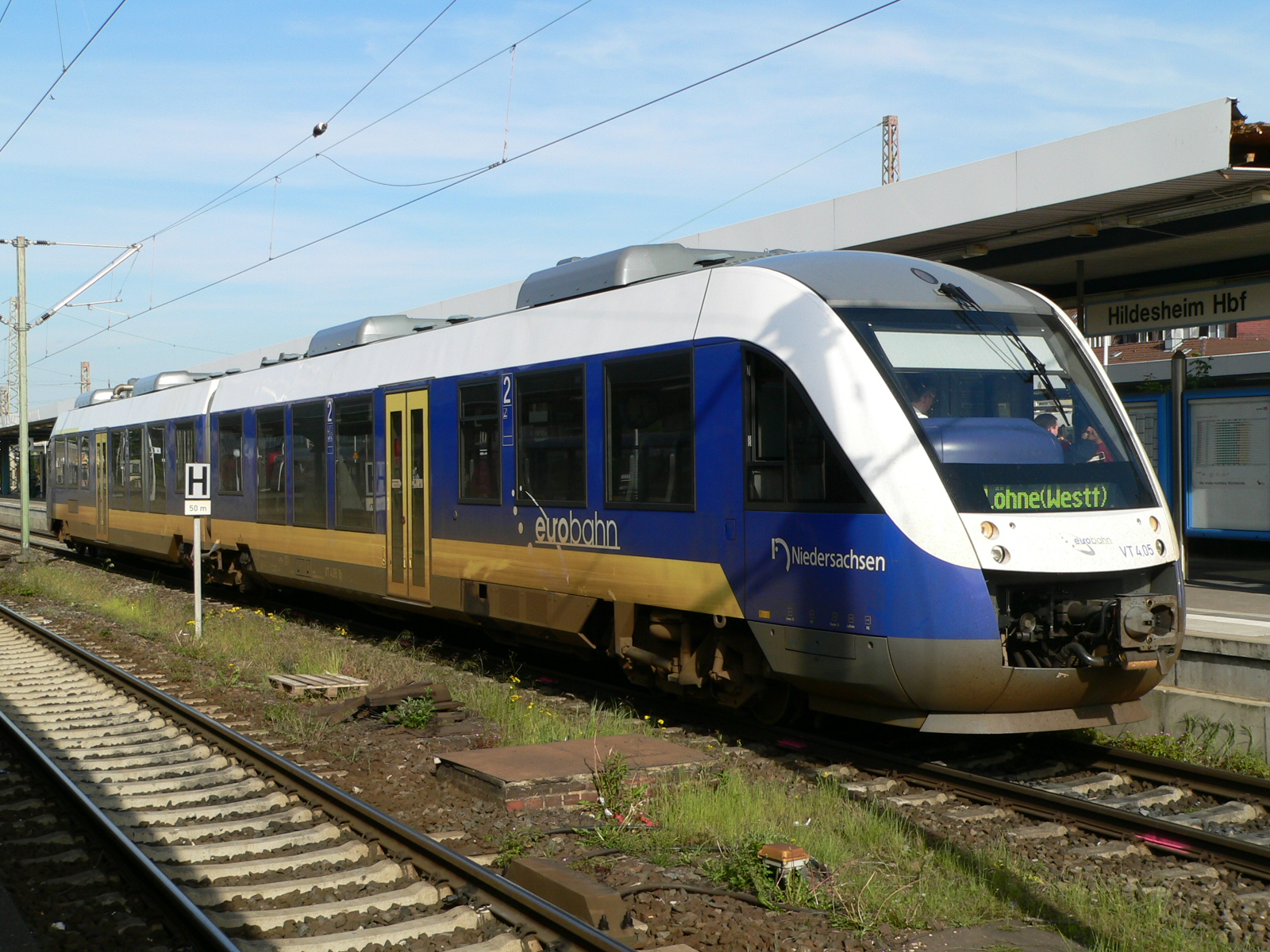
Eurobahn train in Hildesheim

The whole line is served by a Regionalbahn service from Bünde station to Hildesheim called the Weser-Bahn, which is referred to in North Rhine-Westphalia as line RB 77, with through services to Bodenburg, mostly operating hourly, but only every two hours on weekends between Hamelin and Löhne.

Eurobahn won an eight-year contract to operate passenger services between 2003 and 2011. It operated Alstom Coradia LINT diesel railcars, which were owned by Landesnahverkehrsgesellschaft Niedersachsen mbH (Lower Saxony state transport company, LNVG) and allowed an average travel speed of 62 km/h.

In December 2006, the travel time was shortened by 30 minutes by reducing stopping times in Hamelin and Rinteln.

In December 2011, after re-tendering, the contract for operations for the next ten years was taken over by NordWestBahn. It took over the LINT railcars owned by LNVG from Eurobahn and equipped them to its purposes.

== Sources ==
- Michael Bahls (2006). Die Hannover-Altenbekener Eisenbahn (in German). Nordhorn: Kenning. ISBN 3-927587-77-X.
