= Hameln station =

Railway station in Hamelin, Germany

Hameln
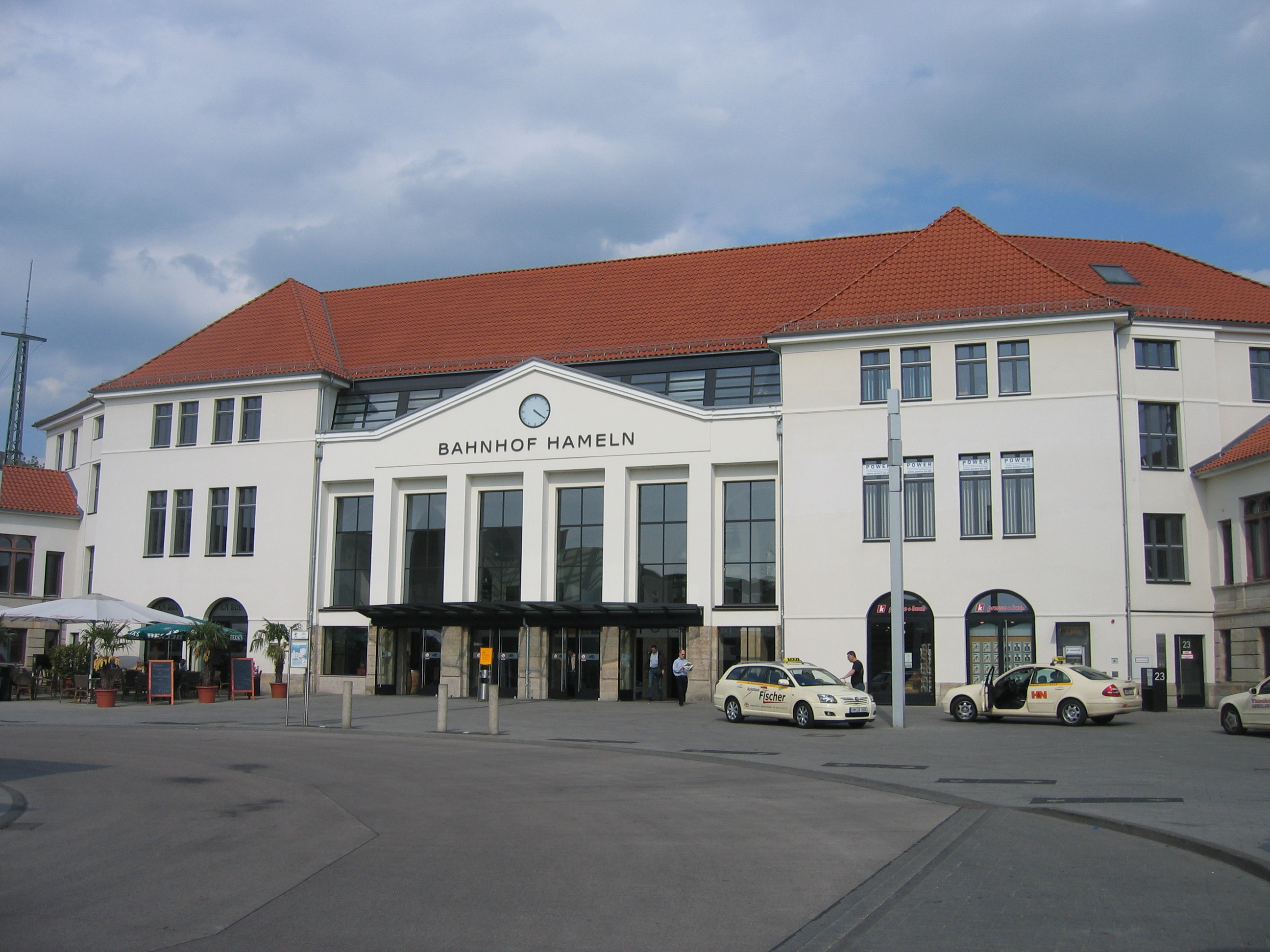
- Station building

General information
- Location: Bahnhofsplatz 21, Hamelin, Lower Saxony; Germany
- Coordinates: 52°06′07″N 9°22′34″E
- Lines: Elze–Löhne (KBS 372); Hanover–Altenbeken (KBS 363.4.5); Hamelin-Lage-Bielefeld (KBS 405)
- Platforms: 6

Construction
- Accessible: Yes

Other information
- Station code: 2525
- DS100 code: HHM
- IBNR: 8000148
- Category: 3
- Fare zone: VHP: Hameln (buses only); GVH: F (VHP transitional tariff, monthly passes only)
- Website: www.bahnhof.de

History
- Opened: 13 April 1872

Services
Preceding station	Start	Following station
Hessisch Oldendorf towards Herford	RB 77	Coppenbrügge towards Hildesheim Hbf
Preceding station	Hanover S-Bahn	Following station
Emmerthal towards Paderborn Hbf	S 5	Bad Münder towards Flughafen
Terminus	S 51	Springe towards Seelze
Location

Hamelin station is a category 3 station in the town of Hamelin (German: Hameln) in the German state of Lower Saxony. It is situated on the Hanover–Altenbeken and the Elze–Löhne lines.

== History ==
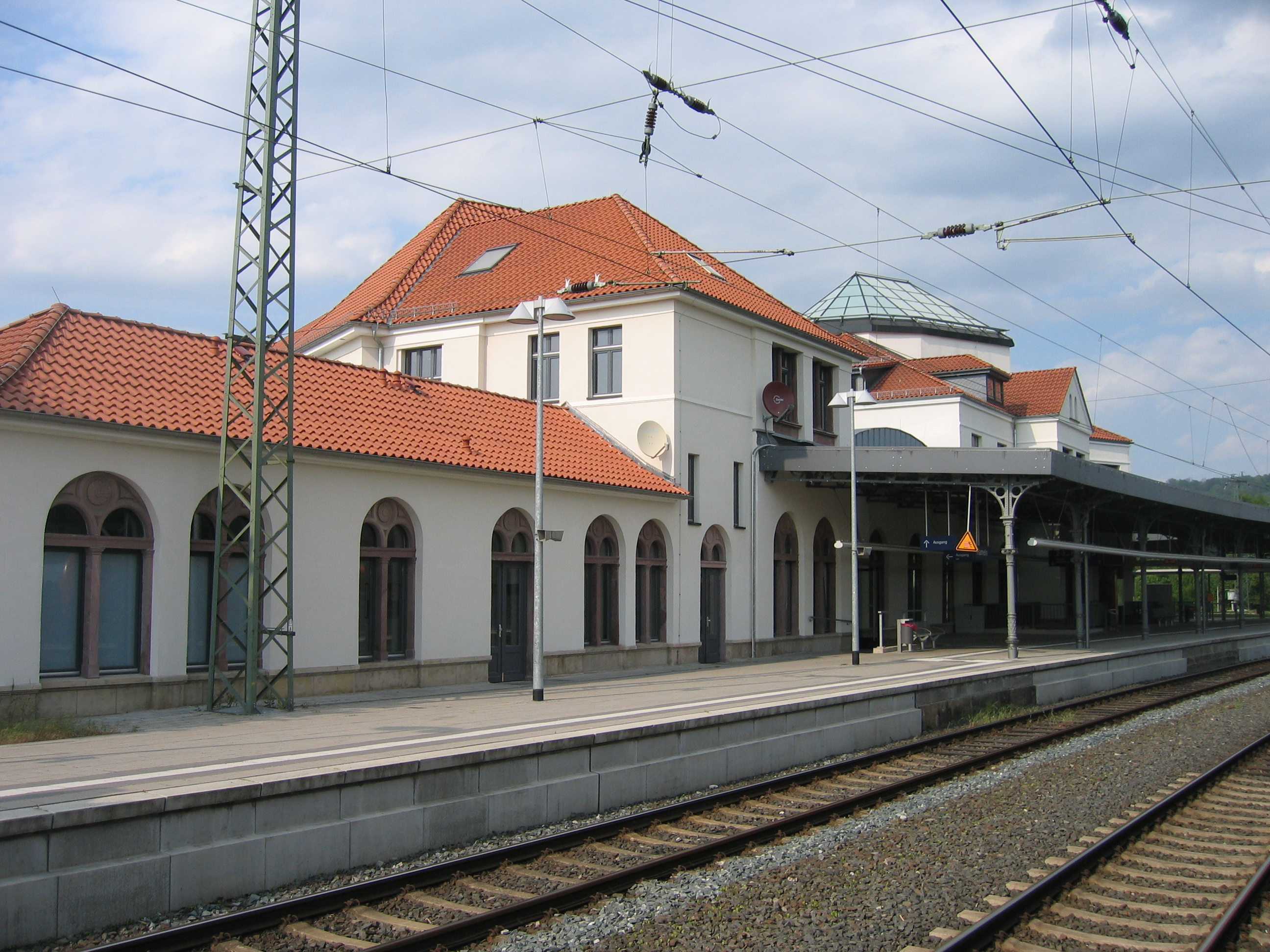
One of the platforms

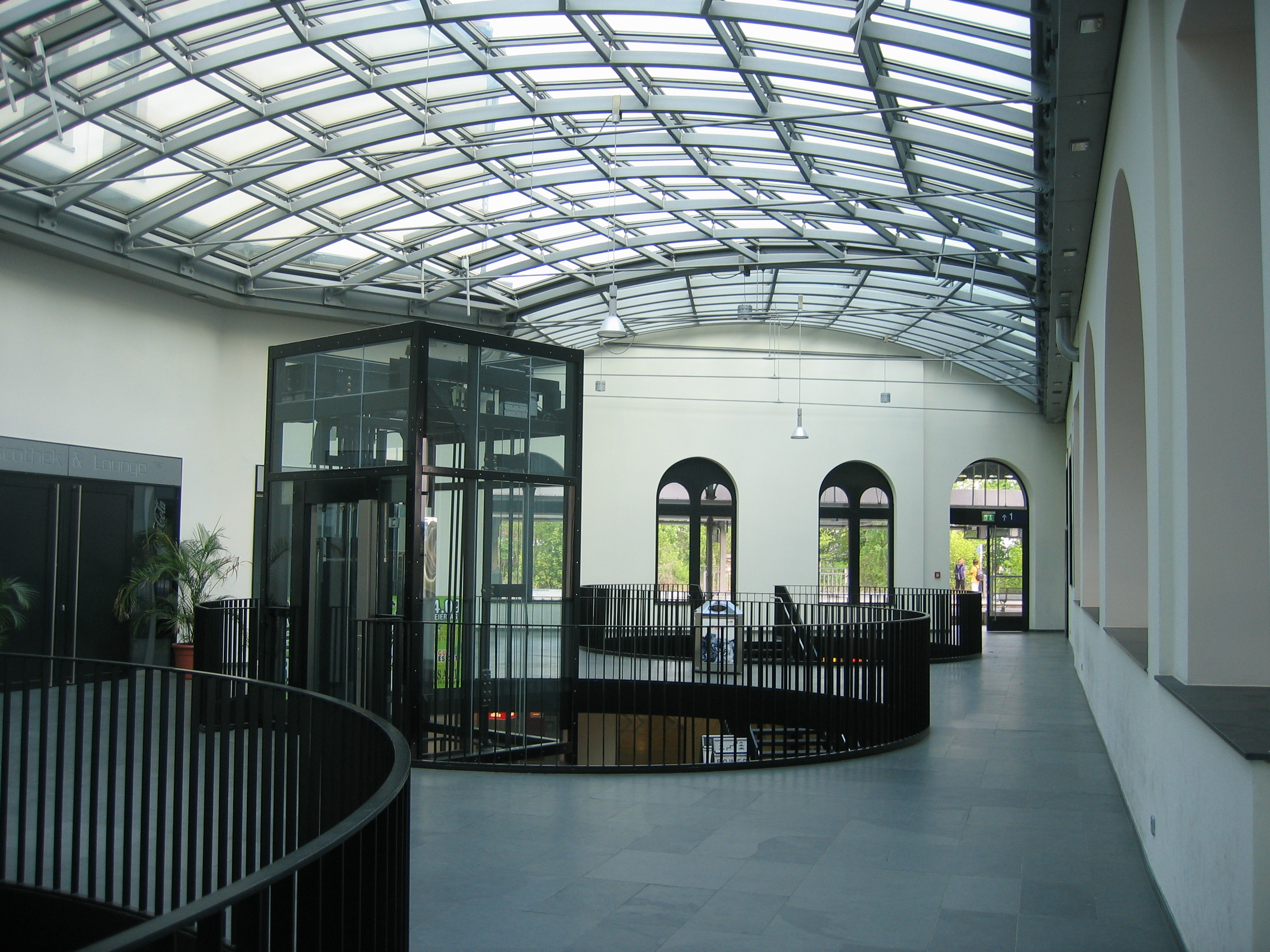
Upstairs hall in the entrance building

Hamelin station was built by the Hanover-Altenbeken Railway Company (German: Hannover-Altenbekener Eisenbahn-Gesellschaft, HAE) on the Hanover–Altenbeken railway, which was opened to the town from Hanover on 13 April 1872, and the wedge-shaped station building was inaugurated on 30 December 1872. On 30 June 1875, the Elze–Löhne railway was opened by the HAE and Hamlin became a junction station. There is extensive trackage to the east of the station building.

On each of the two lines there is a home platform (that is adjacent to the station building) and an island platform with two faces, which were each connected by a tunnel to the entrance building between 1902 and 1906. On 31 October 1903, a line to Lage was connected to the Altenbeken side of the station. Goods sheds and sidings were built north of the railway tracks. On several occasions the tracks had to be adjusted to cope with increased traffic.

In March 1921, the station building burnt down almost completely and was rebuilt by November 1925 and slightly enlarged. The lobby, which was originally on track level, was rebuilt at street level. In 1934 the station was at least briefly called a Hauptbahnhof (central station). In March and April 1945 major damage was inflicted on the station by bomb attacks.

In May 1971 the line was electrified between Hanover and Altenbeken. On 27 September 1980 passenger operations on the line to Lage were closed and the line was finally dismantled in 1985. Passenger trains of the Vorwohle-Emmerthal Railway Company (Vorwohle-Emmerthaler Eisenbahn-Gesellschaft) terminated in Hamelin for a time.

The station building was purchased in 2001 by Stadtwerke Hameln, the municipal public utility company, and were renovated between 2002 and 2006. At the same time the transportation facilities, which continue to be owned by Deutsche Bahn, have been renewed.

Attached to the station was a large depot south of the tracks with two roundhouses. While one roundhouse was demolished in 1974–1977, the other still exists.

== Services ==
Line S 5 of the Hanover S-Bahn runs every half hour to Hanover and every hour to Paderborn. On the Elze–Löhne route there is an hourly connection to Hildesheim and Herford, operated by the Weser-Bahn.

It is a V-shaped station with six platform tracks, three on the Altenbeken side and three on the Löhne side. The station building has a newsagent, a kiosk, a bakery, a pub, a DB ticket office and a disco. In the station forecourt is the Hamelin bus station, which is also a central hub for all city and regional buses in Hamelin-Pyrmont.

Line	Route	Frequency
RB 77	Herford – Löhne – Hamelin – Elze – Nordstemmen – Hildesheim	Hourly
S 5	Hannover Flughafen – Langenhagen Mitte – Hannover – Weetzen – Hamelin – Bad Pyrmont (– Altenbeken – Paderborn)	Every 30 minutes
S 51	Seelze – Hannover – Springe – Hamelin	Hourly (in peak)

== Sources ==
=== References ===
- Michael Bahls (2009). Die Hannover-Altenbekener Eisenbahn (in German). Nordhorn: Kenning. ISBN 3-927587-77-X.
- "Bahnhof Hameln" (in German). Stadtwerke Hameln.
