= Hanover-Altenbeken Railway Company =

The Hanover-Altenbeken Railway Company (German: Hannover-Altenbekener Eisenbahn-Gesellschaft, HAE) was among the companies of the German "railway king" Bethel Henry Strousberg. Its route network at the end of the first phase (up to 1872) consisted of two lines, Hanover–Altenbeken and Weetzen–Haste (Deister Railway). In addition, a branch line was opened from Linden-Küchengarten to Linden-Fischerhof for freight transport. The Löhne–Hamelin–Hildesheim–Vienenburg line was built in a second phase up to 1875. The section to Hildesheim is now known as the Weser railway, further east it is operated as the Hildesheim–Goslar line. This extended the network from the Weser Uplands to the Harz.

The planning of this rail network was already under way during the existence of the Kingdom of Hanover, but its construction commenced after Hanover's annexation by Prussia in 1866. The main purpose of the railway's construction was to connect Hamelin to the rail network and to improve the transport of coal from the Deister hills. Strousberg's motivation, however, was the idea of a connection of the rail network in the east (Silesian industrial belt and East Prussia) with the Ruhr industrial area. Along with building the Altenbeken line, he attempted to acquire the network of the Royal Westphalian Railway Company (Königlich-Westfälische Eisenbahn).

The concession for the lines of the first phase was issued on 25 November 1868, construction of track began in 1869 and 1870 and was interrupted because of labour shortages due to the Franco-Prussian War. For this reason the concession was extended for one year. The first leg between Hanover and Hameln was on opened 13 April 1872. This was followed on 1 May 1872 by the opening of the Weetzen–Barsinghausen section and on 15 August 1872 by the Barsinghausen-Haste section. The total line to Altenbeken was completed on 19 December 1872. The original starting point was Hannover Localbahnhof (local station), later called Südbahnhof (south station), near Bismarckstraße. This had a connection to the railway yards at Pferdeturm, now used for sidings, which gave a further connection to the line to Lehrte and Brunswick.

The Löhne–Hildesheim–Vienenburg line had been built in cooperation with the Magdeburg-Halberstadt Railway Company (Magdeburg-Halberstädter Eisenbahngesellschaft, MHE). Following the financial demise of Strousberg companies, management of the Löhne–Hildesheim–Vienenburg line was taken over by the MHE. It was opened in May/June 1875. The Grauhof–Vienenburg section was operated jointly from its opening.

Strousberg planned more lines to connect with the HAE. After his bankruptcy in the early 1870s these plans were abandoned or taken up by the Prussian state railways, such as the Hildesheim–Brunswick railway.

Following the nationalisation of the MHE system, the HAE system was taken over, although the Prussian state had no special interest in the railway. On 1 February 1880, the HAE became part of the administration and operation of the Prussian state railways and on 1 April 1881 the Prussian state took possession of its assets.
