= Weser-Bahn =

RB 77 Weser-Bahn

Overview
- Locale: North Rhine-Westphalia, Germany
- Current operator: Regionalverkehre Start Deutschland (since Dec. 2021)

Route
- Distance travelled: 110 km

Technical
- Operating speed: 120 km/h (75 mph) (maximum)
- Timetable number: 372

The Weser-Bahn (Weser railway) is the name used in the German state of North Rhine-Westphalia (NRW) for a Regionalbahn service that connects Herford in NRW via Löhne, Rinteln, Hamelin, Elze to Hildesheim, running hourly. The section of the route from Rinteln to Hildesheim lies in the state of Lower Saxony. The service is numbered as RB 77 in NRW.

== Route ==
The Weser-Bahn service runs on four different railway lines:

- It uses the Minden–Hamm railway line between Herford and Löhne,
- In Löhne, it changes to the Elze–Löhne railway, which it used for its whole length;
- From Elze to Nordstemmen, it runs over the Hanoverian Southern Railway;
- Its final section runs to Hildesheim via the Lehrte–Nordstemmen railway.

== Rail services ==
Until December 2003, the Weser-Bahn was operated by Deutsche Bahn with class 628 DMUs.

In 2002, the tender for the operation of Regionalbahn service RB 77 for eight years was publicly advertised; this was let to Eurobahn, a subsidiary of the Keolis group (Keolis Deutschland GmbH & Co. KG, Berlin), based in Bielefeld.

From December 2011 to December 2021, the service was operated by NordWestBahn under a new ten-year contract. In November 2020, Regionalverkehre Start Deutschland announced that it would operate the service from December 2021 on.

With the timetable change in December 2023, the long-distance train service between the Ruhr region and between Amsterdam and Berlin was significantly changed. As a result, the RB 77 line no longer has a good connection to Bielefeld in Löhne. Therefore, since December 2023, the RB 77 has no longer run to Bünde during the week, but instead to Herford, where it is integrated into the regular service hub with connections to Bielefeld, Paderborn, and Hengelo.

It is operated hourly using two-part Alstom Coradia LINT diesel railcars, which are owned by Landesnahverkehrsgesellschaft Niedersachsen mbH (Lower Saxony state transport company, LNVG). In operations, the trains on the Weser-Bahn service continue through Hildesheim towards the Lamme Valley Railway to Bodenburg.

== Fares ==
The Weser-Bahn runs through several fare zones, some of which overlap. It can be used with the following fares:

- between Bünde and Rinteln Der Sechser ("the six") fare of the Verkehrsverbund OstWestfalenLippe (transport association of Ostwestfalen-Lippe) applies;
- between Hessisch Oldendorf and Hildesheim and on the Lamme Valley Railway to Bodenburg the fares of the Großraum-Verkehr Hannover (transport association of greater Hannover, GVH) apply (but only for travel cards, trips must include at least one station in the outer ring of the GVH);
- for all journeys not included in the transport association zones, Deutsche Bahn fares and the NRW state fare (NRW-Tarif). The Lower Saxony state fare (Niedersachsen-Ticket) is valid on the entire Weser-Bahn between Bünde and Hildesheim.

Adjacent bus fare zones are:

- between Hessian Oldendorf and Osterwald (Salzhemmendorf), the Öffi-Tarif of Nahverkehr Hameln-Pyrmont (Hameln-Pyrmont local transport);
- between Elze and Hildesheim Hbf the fares of the Regionalverkehr Hildesheim (Hildesheim regional transport, RVHI).
