= Löhne station =

Railway station in Löhne, Germany

Löhne (Westf)
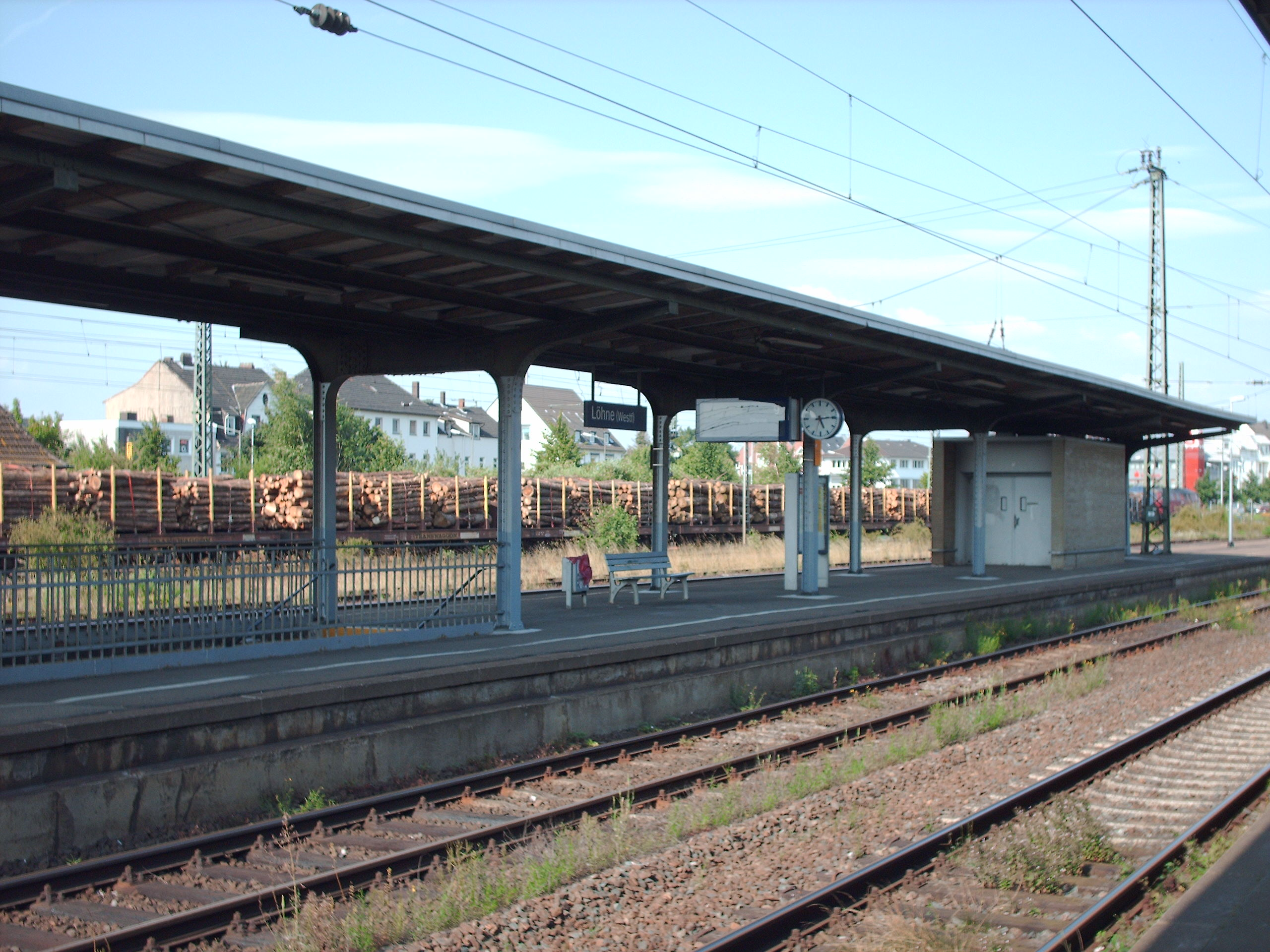

General information
- Location: Bünder Str. 7, Löhne, NRW; Germany
- Coordinates: 52°11′47″N 8°42′48″E
- Lines: Hamm–Minden (KBS 370, KBS 400); Löhne–Rheine railway (KBS 375); Elze–Löhne railway (KBS 372)
- Platforms: 8 (6 in operation)

Construction
- Accessible: Yes

Other information
- Station code: 3768
- DS100 code: HL
- IBNR: 8000233
- Category: 4
- Fare zone: Westfalentarif: 62601
- Website: www.bahnhof.de

History
- Opened: 21 November 1855

Services
Preceding station	National Express Germany	Following station
Herford towards Cologne/Bonn Airport	RE 6 (Rhein-Weser-Express)	Bad Oeynhausen towards Minden
Preceding station		Following station
Kirchlengern towards Rheine	RE 60	Bad Oeynhausen towards Braunschweig Hbf
Herford towards Bielefeld Hbf	RE 70	Bad Oeynhausen towards Braunschweig Hbf
Preceding station		Following station
Herford towards Bielefeld Hbf	RE 78	Bad Oeynhausen towards Nienburg (Weser)
Preceding station	DB Regio Nord	Following station
Kirchlengern towards Rheine	RE 62	Terminus
Preceding station	Start	Following station
Herford Terminus	RB 77	Bad Oeynhausen Süd towards Hildesheim Hbf
Location

Löhne (Westfalen) station is in the city of Löhne in the northeast of the German state of North Rhine-Westphalia. It lies on the Hamm–Minden railway, which is part of the Cologne-Minden trunk line that was originally proposed by Friedrich Harkort as part of a line from Berlin to Cologne via Hanover.

In Löhne, line branch off to Rheine via Osnabrück (part of the Hanoverian Western Railway to Emden) and to Elze via Hamelin (continuing to Hildesheim) and, as a result, the station was long an important junction in northwestern Germany as an interchange station with its own marshalling yard.

== History ==
Until the mid-20th century, Löhne station was a major hub for passenger and especially freight traffic in north-western Germany. The lines of the Cologne-Minden Railway Company (opened in 1847), the Royal Hanoverian State Railways (1855) and the Hanover-Altenbeken Railway Company (Löhne–Hildesheim–Vienenburg, 1875) met with each other here.

For many years, long-distance trains crossed here on their way from Berlin to Paris via Hanover and Cologne and Amsterdam to central Germany via Osnabrück and Hildesheim. The extensive rail facilities were built with many tunnels and flyovers so that a grade-separated crossing of the two main lines was possible. Even today, independent paths on the Hamm–Minden Railway and the Elze–Löhne and the Löhne–Rheine lines are possible.

The former significance of the station is lost today and it is only classified by Deutsche Bahn as a category 4 station.

== Rail services ==
Regional services as of 2025:

Line	Route	Frequency (mins)
RE 6	Minden – Löhne – Herford – Bielefeld – Hamm – Dortmund – Duisburg – Düsseldorf – Neuss – Cologne – Cologne/Bonn Airport	60
RE 60	Rheine – Osnabrück – Herford – Löhne – Minden – Hannover – Braunschweig	120
RE 62	Rheine – Ibbenbüren – Osnabrück – Melle – Löhne	120
RE 70	Bielefeld – Herford – Löhne – Minden – Hannover – Braunschweig	120
RB 77	Herford – Löhne – Hamelin – Hildesheim	60
RE 78	Bielefeld – Löhne – Herford – Minden – Nienburg	120

The station is covered by Der Sechser (“the six”) fares of the Zweckverband Verkehrsverbund OWL (Ostwestfalen-Lippe transport association) and the statewide NRW-tariff fares. The Niedersachsen-Ticket can also be used on the regional services to Lower Saxony.

The former marshalling yard has been demolished, but no use for the abandoned site has yet been found, so that it presents passengers with a large landscape of gravel. The site is difficult to access as it lies between the lines to Bielefeld and Osnabrück.

=== Service facilities in the station ===
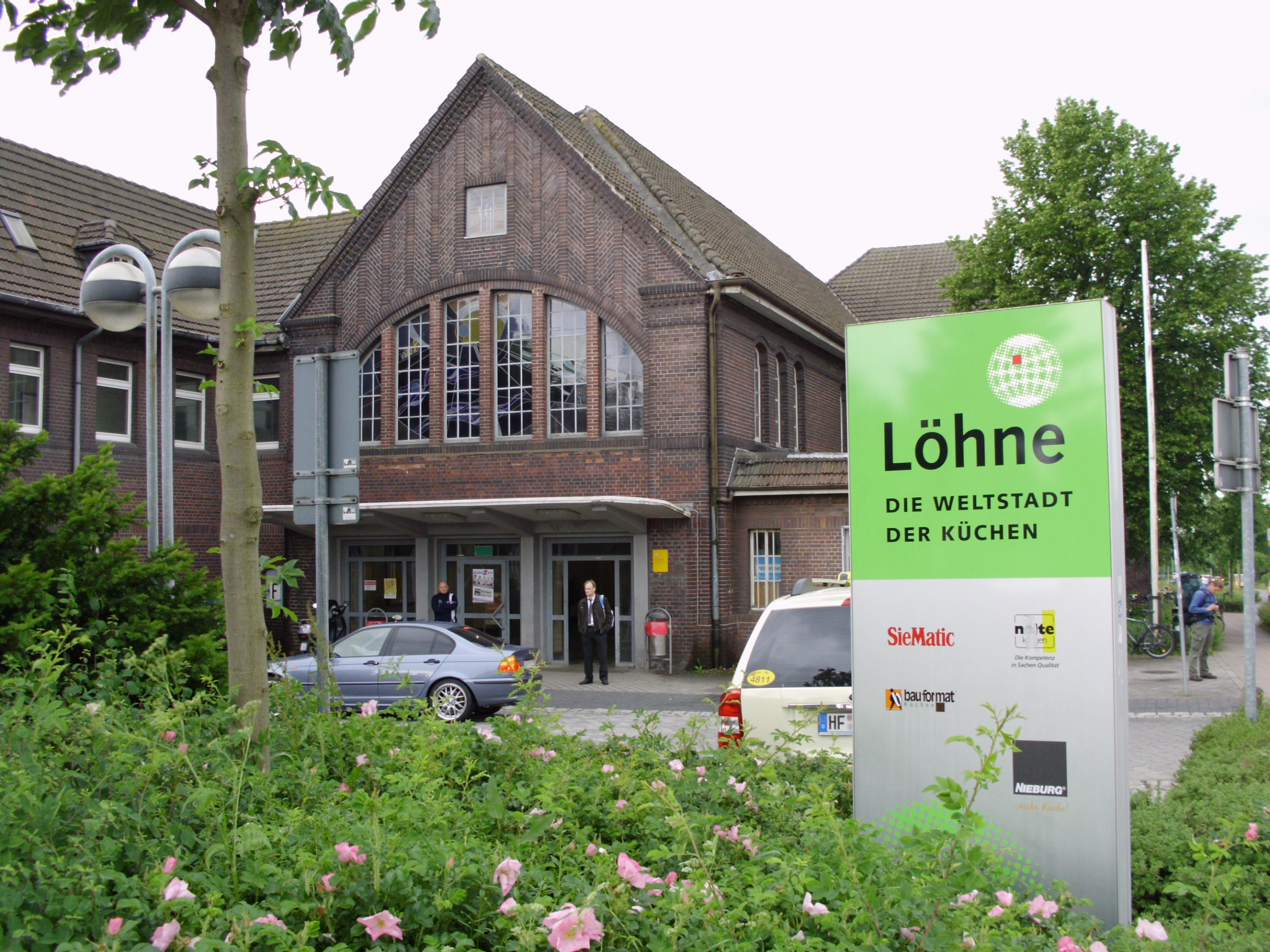
Main entrance to the station

The station has a private ticket agency. A new parking area was opened at the back of the station in 2011.

== Erich Maria Remarque ==
The station acquired literary significance in Erich Maria Remarque's novel, All Quiet on the Western Front: during the movement of troops in the First World War, soldiers were always told by their superiors to change at Löhne. The station forecourt, which contains the central bus station, has since its redesign in the 1990s therefore been called Erich-Maria-Remarque-Platz.
