= List of railway stations in Bremen =

Map of the Regio-S-Bahn network showing the railway stations in the state and outside it

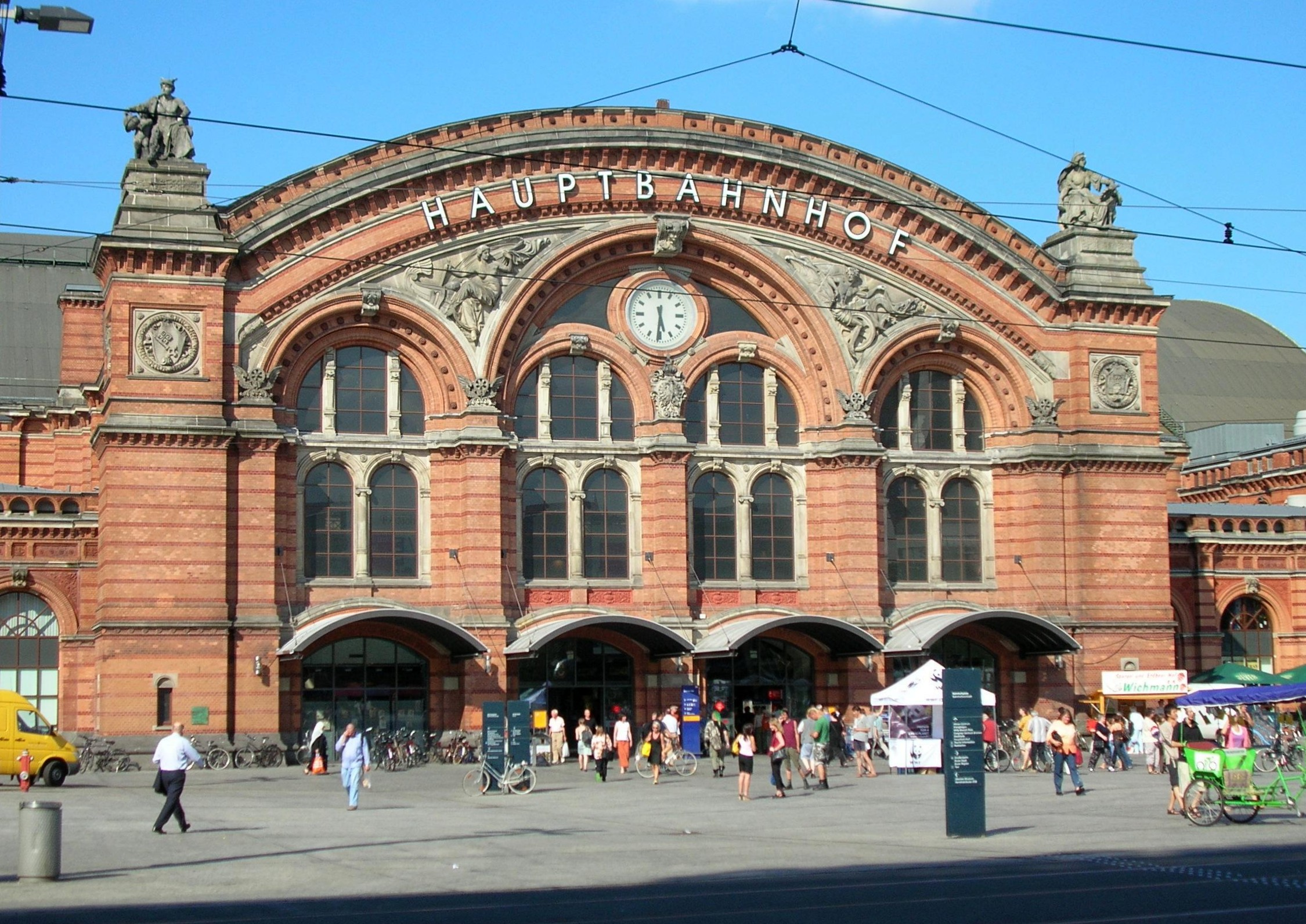
Bremen Hauptbahnhof station building

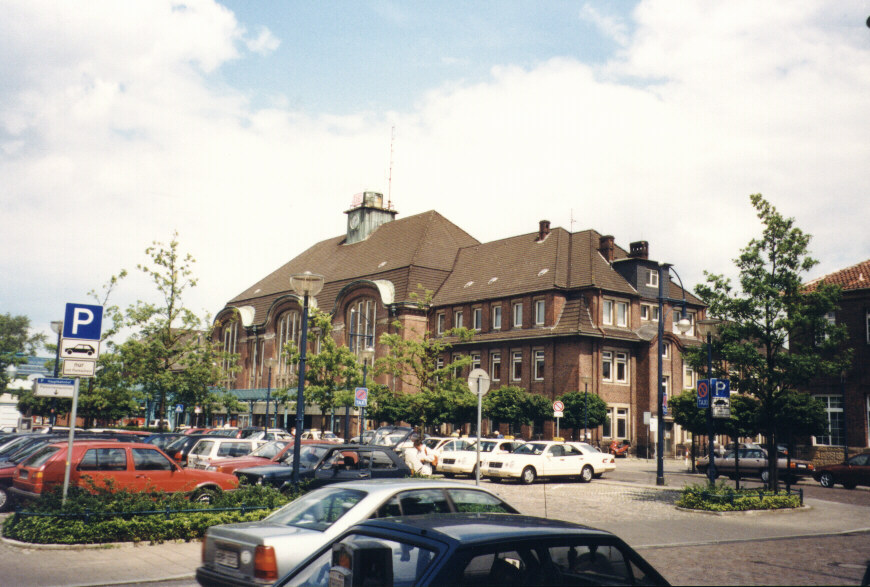
Bremerhaven Hauptbahnhof station building

This article shows a list of railway stations in the Free Hanseatic City of Bremen. The list is divided into the two cities composing this federal state: Bremen and Bremerhaven.

== Railway stations ==
=== Bremen ===
- Bremen Hauptbahnhof
- Bremen-Arbergen
- Bremen-Aumund
- Bremen-Blumenthal
- Bremen-Burg
- Bremen-Farge
- Bremen-Farge Ost
- Bremen Föhrenstraße
- Bremen-Hemelingen
- Bremen Kreinsloger
- Bremen-Lesum
- Bremen-Mahndorf
- Bremen Mühlenstraße
- Bremen-Neustadt
- Bremen-Oberneuland
- Bremen-Oslebshausen
- Bremen-Schönebeck
- Bremen Schwanewede Löhstraße
- Bremen-Sebaldsbrück
- Bremen-St. Magnus
- Bremen Turnerstraße
- Bremen-Vegesack
- Bremen-Walle

=== Bremerhaven ===
- Bremerhaven Hauptbahnhof
- Bremerhaven-Lehe
- Bremerhaven-Speckenbüttel
- Bremerhaven-Wulsdorf

== See also ==
- Bremen S-Bahn
- Railway stations in Germany
