= Bremen-Oslebshausen station =

Railway station in Gröpelingen, Germany

Coordinates: 53.1353°N 8.7406°E

Bremen Oslebshausen
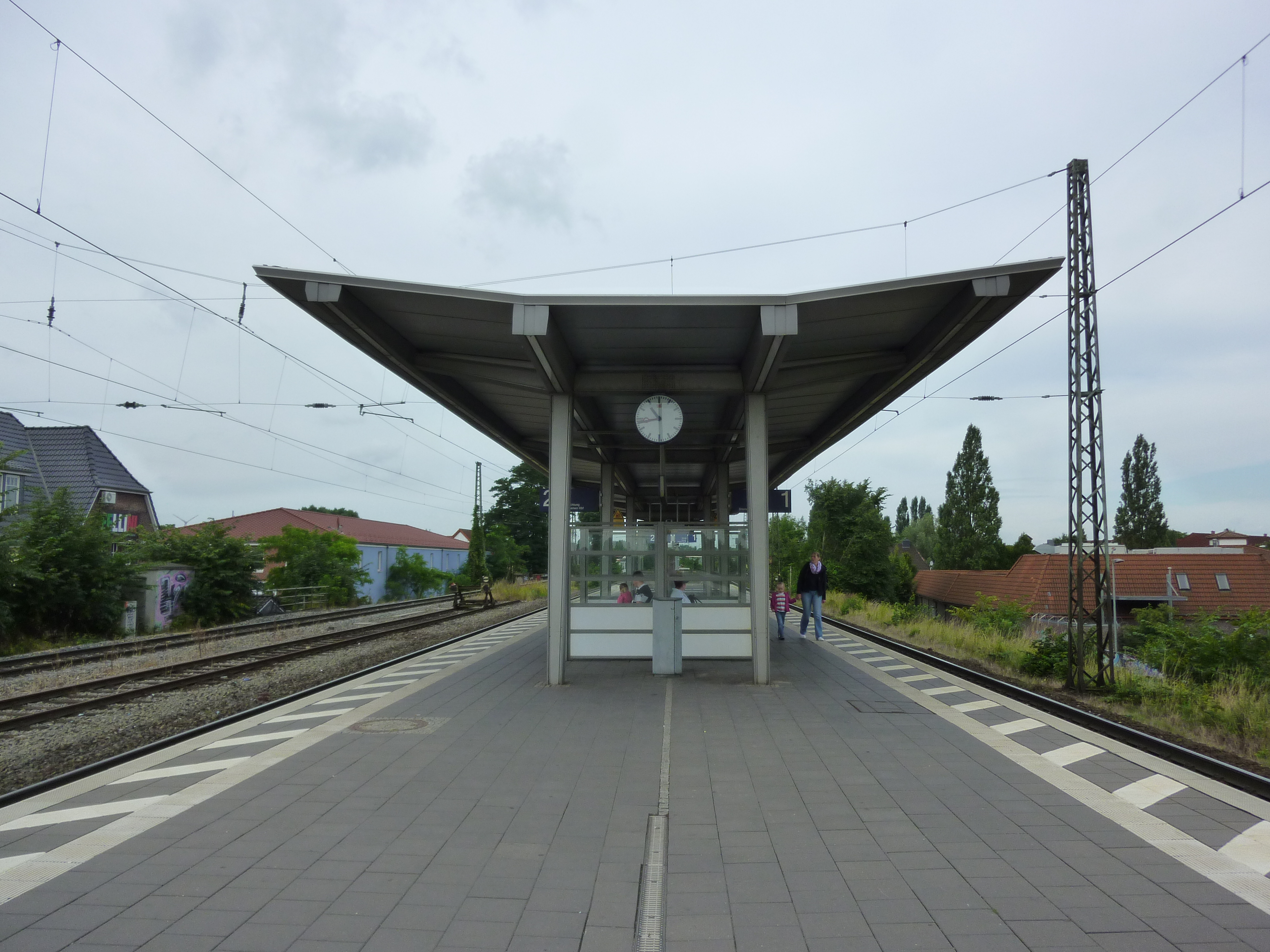
- Bremen-Oslebshausen in 2012

General information
- Location: Oslebshausen, Bremen, Bremen; Germany

Other information
- Station code: n/a
- DS100 code: HBOS
- Fare zone: VBN: 100 and 101

Services
Preceding station	Bremen S-Bahn	Following station
Bremen-Burg towards Bremen-Farge	RS1	Bremen-Walle towards Verden (Aller)
Location

Bremen-Oslebshausen is a railway station located on the Vegesack-Bremen and Bremen-Bremerhaven railway lines. The station is only served by the local, RS1 commuter line operated by NordWestBahn, with the RS2 commuter line to and from Bremerhaven, and longer distance services, passing through without stopping.

The station has an island platform design, with access at the western end down to Oslebshauser Tor, a road which the station bridges. Access is also available via an underpass to Am Oslebshauser Bahnhof, where the station's bus stop is located. The station also has a bypass track to the south.

== S-Bahn ==
Currently, the RS1 line connects Bremen-Oslebshausen and Bremen Hbf to the south-east every half hour, and every quarter-hour during peak hours. Between 12:30am and 4:30am, the line runs hourly. After reaching Bremen Hbf, trains continue on to Verden every hour, and half-hour at peak periods, with one overnight service.

To the north-west, trains run between Bremen-Oslebshausen to Bremen-Vegesack every half hour, and every quarter-hour during peak hours. Between 12:30am and 4:30am, the line runs hourly. After reaching Bremen-Vegesack, trains continue on to Farge every half-hour service between 5am and 12:30am.

The whole S-Bahn Network of the Bremen S-Bahn is part of the VBN.

Line	Route	Frequency			Notes	Length
Line	Route	Peak	Off-peak	Overnight	Notes	Length
RS 1	Bremen-Farge–Bremen-Vegesack	30'	20'	N/a	Trial runs in 2007; part of RS 1 since December 2011	10,4 km
RS 1	Bremen-Oslebshausen -Bremen-Vegesack	15'	30'	60'	Opened December 2011	9,3 km
RS 1	Bremen-Oslebshausen -Bremen Hbf	15'	30'	60'	Opened December 2011	7,9 km
RS 1	Bremen Hbf–Verden	30'	60'	Infrequent	Opened December 2011	35,7 km

== Bus connections ==
The bus lines 80 (Bf-Oslehausen - Gröpelingen) and 81 (Gröpelingen - Hüttenstr. Süd) connect to the station on Am Oslebshauser Bahnhof. Both lines are operated by the BSAG, and are part of the VBN.
