= Ritterhude station =

Railway station in Ritterhude, Germany

Coordinates: 53.1836°N 8.7543°E

Ritterhude
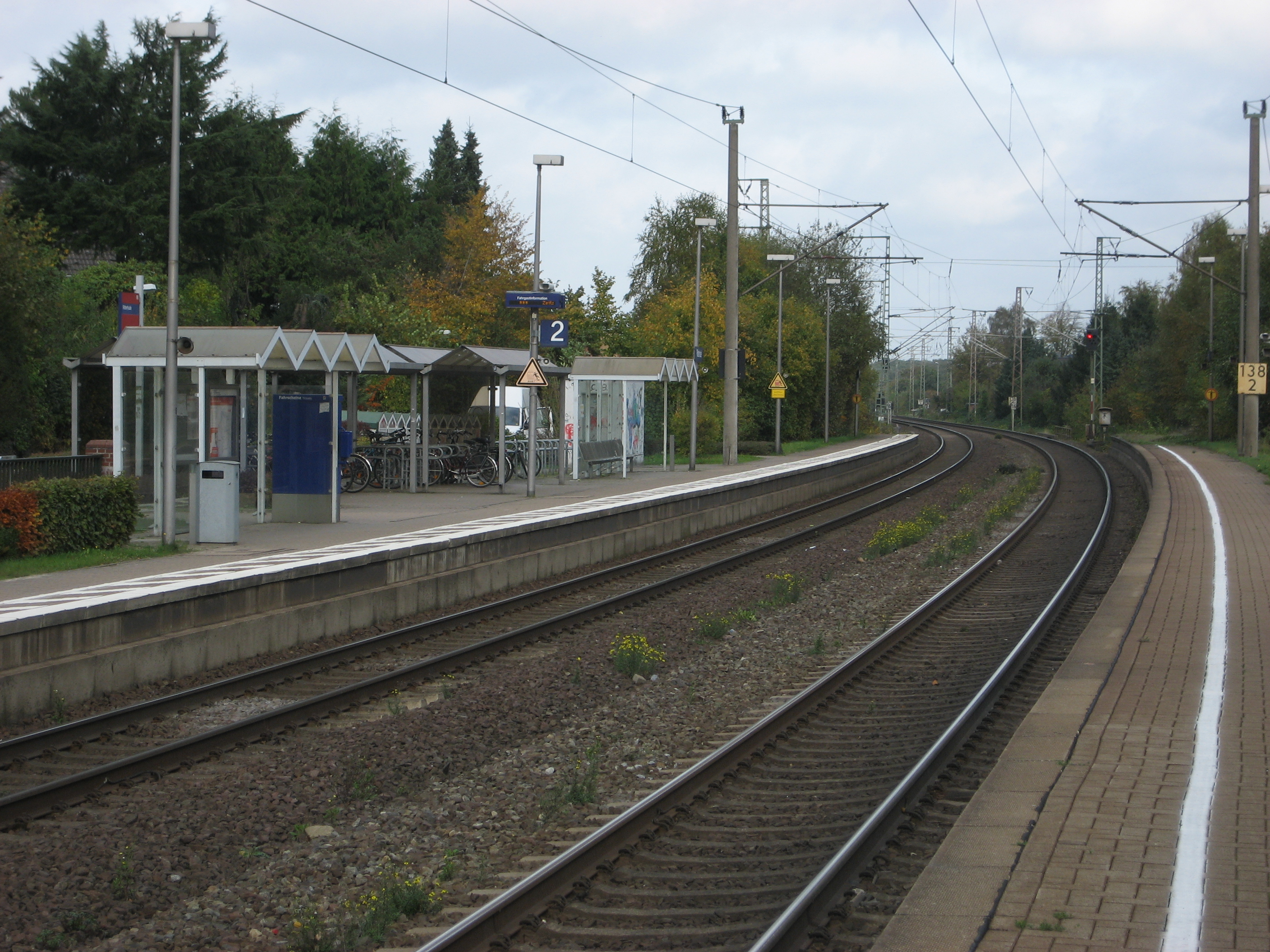

General information
- Location: Ritterhude, Osterholz, Lower Saxony; Germany
- Platforms: 2

Other information
- Station code: n/a
- DS100 code: HRTH
- Fare zone: VBN: 209 and 210

Services
Preceding station	Bremen S-Bahn	Following station
Osterholz-Scharmbeck towards Bremerhaven-Lehe	RS2	Bremen-Burg towards Twistringen
Preceding station	EVB	Following station
Osterholz-Scharmbeck towards Stade	Moor Express	Bremen-Burg towards Bremen Hbf
Location

Ritterhude is the name of a railway station on the Bremen-Bremerhaven railway line. The station serves the town of Ritterhude in the district of Osterholz, Germany.

RegionalBahn trains from Bremerhaven to Bremen call at the station, offering an hourly connection to both cities, with some peak services during the early morning and afternoon hours. The station, due to its significance for commuters into Bremen, features a park and ride facility. Access to the platforms is provided at level from the neighbouring parking lots, the tracks can be crossed by means of a pedestrian subway. Due to the station's situation in a curve, stopping trains tilt notably to the side whilst stationary.
