= Bremen-Lesum station =

Railway station in Burglesum, Germany

Coordinates: 53.1706°N 8.6866°E

Bremen Lesum
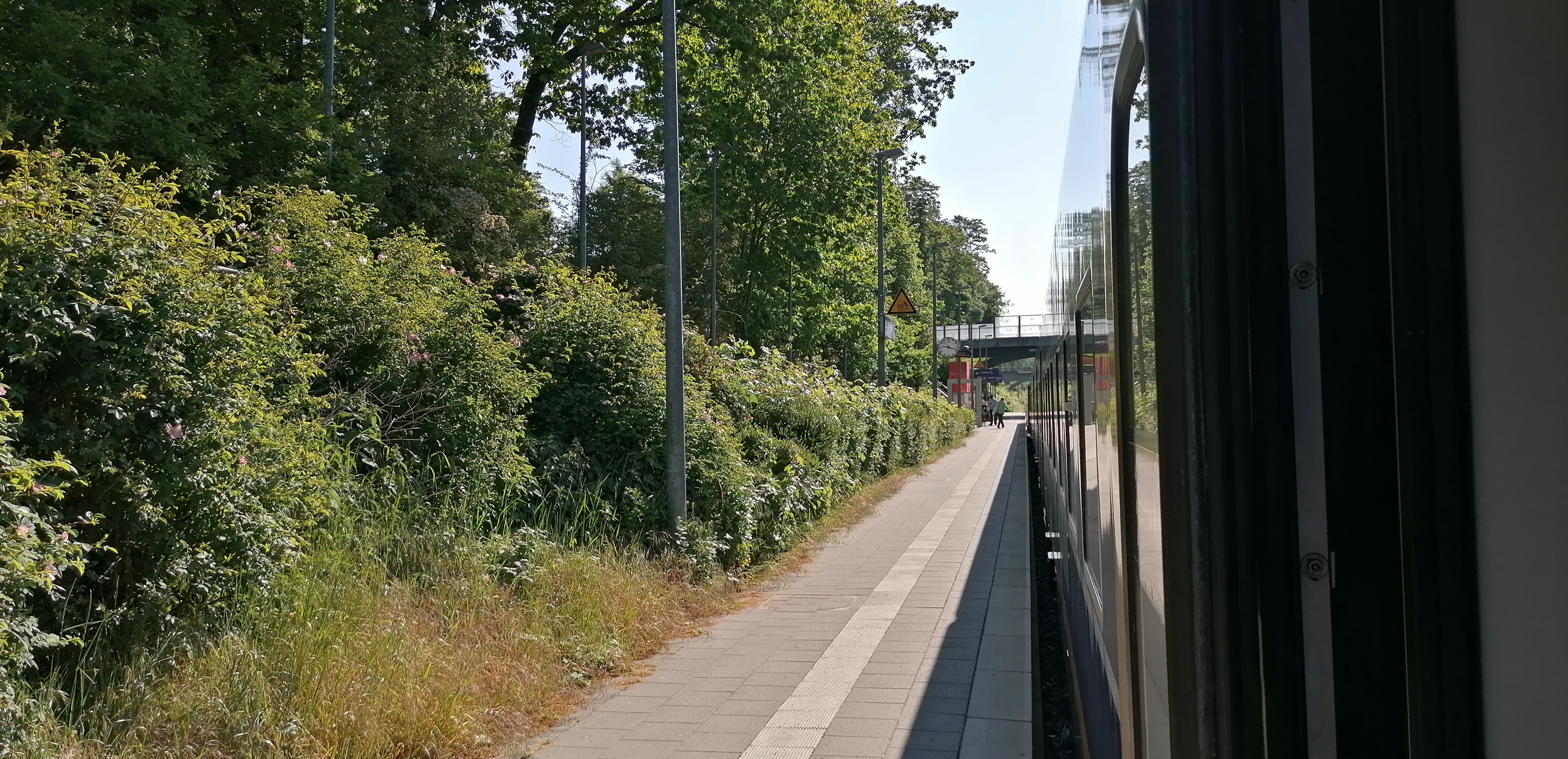
- Bremen-Lesum station in 2020

General information
- Location: Lesum, Bremen, Bremen; Germany

Other information
- Station code: n/a
- DS100 code: HBL
- Fare zone: VBN: 101

Services
| Preceding station | Bremen S-Bahn | Following station |
|---|---|---|
| Bremen-St. Magnus towards Bremen-Farge | RS1 | Bremen-Burg towards Verden (Aller) |
Location

Bremen-Lesum is a railway station serving the Lesum district of Bremen. The station is located on the Bremen-Vegesack–Bremen railway line, served by Bremen S-Bahn line RS1, operated by NordWestBahn.

The station has a side platform design, with access to Hindenburgstraße which bridges over the station from both platforms. There are additional entrances, with access to platform 1 (towards Bremen Hbf) from Am Mönchshof, and access to platform 2 (towards Bremen-Vegesack) from Lesumer Heerstraße and the adjacent car park.

== S-Bahn ==
Currently, the RS1 line connects Bremen-Lesum and Bremen Hbf to the south-east every half hour, and every quarter-hour during peak hours. Between 12:30am and 4:30am, the line runs hourly. After reaching Bremen Hbf, trains continue on to Verden every hour, and half-hour at peak periods, with one overnight service.

To the north-west, trains run between Bremen-Lesum to Bremen-Vegesack every half hour, and every quarter-hour during peak hours. Between 12:30am and 4:30am, the line runs hourly. After reaching Bremen-Vegesack, trains continue on to Farge every half-hour service between 5am and 12:30am.

The whole of the Bremen S-Bahn is part of the VBN.

| Line | Route | Frequency | | | Notes | Length |
| Line | Route | Peak | Off-peak | Overnight | Notes | Length |
|---|---|---|---|---|---|---|
| RS 1 | Bremen-Farge–Bremen-Vegesack | 30' | 20' | N/a | Trial runs in 2007; part of RS 1 since December 2011 | 10,4 km |
| RS 1 | Bremen-Lesum -Bremen-Vegesack | 15' | 30' | 60' | Opened December 2011 | 3,9 km |
| RS 1 | Bremen-Lesum -Bremen Hbf | 15' | 30' | 60' | Opened December 2011 | 13,3 km |
| RS 1 | Bremen Hbf–Verden | 30' | 60' | Infrequent | Opened December 2011 | 35,7 km |

== Bus Connections ==
Bus lines run from Lesumer Heerstraße, a road just to the north of the station.

The bus lines 90 (Neuenkirchen/Rönnebeck - Gröpelingen), N7 (Bremen Hbf–Neuenkirchen) serve the stop, all of which are operated by the BSAG, and are part of the VBN.
