= Bremen-Burg station =

Railway station in Burglesum, Germany

Bremen Burg
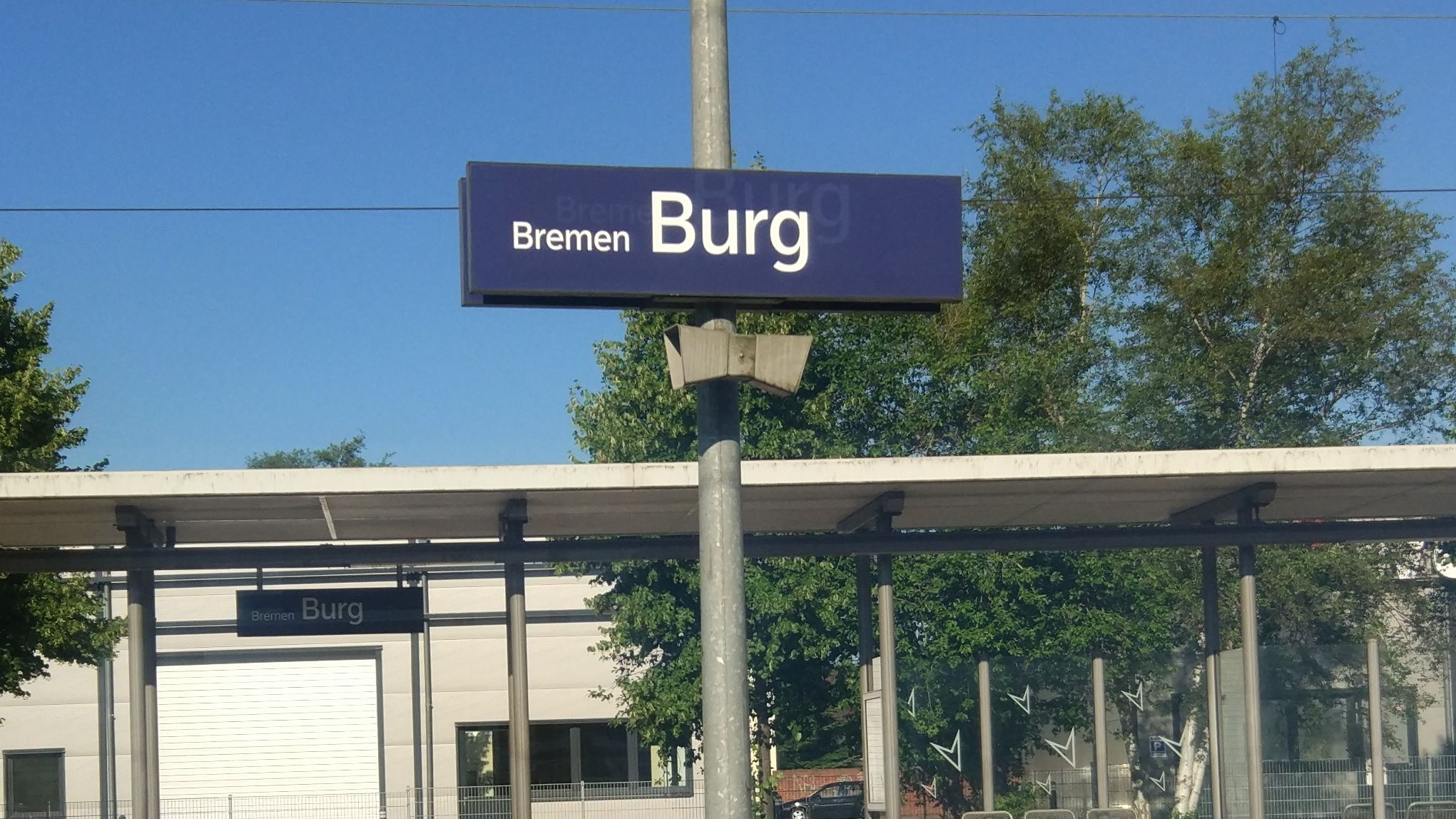
- Bremen-Burg in 2017

General information
- Location: Burg, Bremen, Bremen; Germany
- Coordinates: 53°09′35″N 8°42′17″E
- Owner: Deutsche Bahn
- Operator: DB Netz; DB Station&Service
- Lines: Bremen–Bremerhaven railway; Bremen-Vegesack–Bremen railway

Other information
- Station code: 857
- DS100 code: HBB
- Category: 4
- Fare zone: VBN: 101
- Website: www.bahnhof.de

Services
| Preceding station | Bremen S-Bahn | Following station |
|---|---|---|
| Bremen-Lesum towards Bremen-Farge | RS1 | Bremen-Oslebshausen towards Verden (Aller) |
| Ritterhude towards Bremerhaven-Lehe | RS2 | Bremen Hbf towards Twistringen |
| Preceding station | EVB | Following station |
| Ritterhude towards Stade | Moor Express | Bremen Hbf towards Bremen Hbf |
Location
- Location within Bremen Location within Germany Location within Europe

Bremen-Burg is a railway station serving the Burg district of Bremen, located on the Vegesack-Bremen and Bremen-Bremerhaven railway lines. The station also serves as an interchange between the RS1 from Bremen-Vegesack, and the RS2 line from Bremerhaven-Lehe, both operated by NordWestBahn. Longer distance services also bypass the station. Between May and October the Moor express, a heritage line, also stops at the station four times a day in each direction.

The station has four platforms with a side platform design, with access via an underpass to Am Burger bhf, where there is a small kiosk. To the left of the exit is a 3 storey car park, as well as a smaller surface car park, access to which is also provided via a footpath from platform 2. To the right of the exit is a small bus station. The station also has a bypass track to the south.

== S-Bahn ==
=== RS1 ===
Currently, the RS1 line connects Bremen-Burg and Bremen Hbf to the south-east every half hour, and every quarter-hour during rush hour. Between 12:30am and 4:30am, the line runs hourly. After reaching Bremen Hbf, trains continue on to Verden every hour, and half-hour at peak periods, with one overnight service.

To the north-west, trains run between Bremen-Burg to Bremen-Vegesack every half hour, and every quarter-hour during rush hour. Between 12:30am and 4:30am, the line runs hourly. After reaching Bremen-Vegesack, trains continue on to Bremen-Farge every half-hour service between 5am and 12:30am.

=== RS2 ===
The RS2 line connects Bremen-Burg and Bremen Hbf to the south east every hour, before continuing on to Twistringen. During rush hour (between 5am and 10:30am, and 5:30pm and 7:20pm), an additional service runs as far as Bremen hbf, making the frequency every half hour. The hourly service runs until 1:40am on weekends. Trains run non-stop to Bremen Hbf, skipping the stations served by the RS1

To the north-west, trains run between Bremen-Burg and Bremerhaven-Lehe every hour, and every half-hour during rush hour (between 5am and 10:30am, and 5:30pm and 7:20pm). The hourly service runs until 2:20am on weekends.

=== Timetabled S-Bahn services ===
The whole S-Bahn Network of the Bremen S-Bahn is part of the VBN.

| Line | Route | Frequency | | | Notes | Length |
| Line | Route | Peak | Off-peak | Overnight | Notes | Length |
|---|---|---|---|---|---|---|
| RS1 | Bremen-Farge–Bremen-Vegesack | 30' | 20' | N/a | Trial runs in 2007; part of RS 1 since December 2011 | 10,4 km |
| RS1 | Bremen-Burg -Bremen-Vegesack | 15' | 30' | 60' | Opened December 2011 | 5,6 km |
| RS1 | Bremen-Burg -Bremen Hbf | 15' | 30' | 60' | Opened December 2011 | 11,6 km |
| RS1 | Bremen Hbf–Verden | 30' | 60' | Infrequent | Opened December 2011 | 35,7 km |
| RS2 | Bremerhaven-Lehe - Bremen-Burg | 30' | 60' | Infrequent | Operational since December 2010 | 54 km |
| RS2 | Bremen-Burg - Bremen Hbf | 30' | 60' | Infrequent | Operational since December 2010 | 11,6 km |
| RS2 | Bremen Hbf - Twistringen | 60' | 60' | Infrequent | Operational since December 2010 | 41,8 km |

== Bus connections ==
Bremen-Burg acts as a local bus hub, with connections to 7 local bus lines operated by BSAG, part of the VNB:

- 90 - (Gröpelingen - Neuenkirchen)
- 91/92 - (Gröpelingen - Rönnebeck)
- 93 - (Gröpelingen - Marßel)
- 94 - (Marßel - Schwanewede)
- 95 - (Gröpelingen - Bockhorn)
- N7 - (Hauptbahnhof - Neuenkirchen)

It is additionally served by 2 regional bus lines, operated by Weser-Ems-Bus, part of the VBN, which is owned by DB Regio Bus:

- 660 - (Bremen Hbf - Hagen)
- 680 - (Gröpelingen - Wallhöffen)
