= Bremen-Walle station =

Railway station in Walle, Germany

Coordinates: 53.1043°N 8.7858°E

Bremen Walle
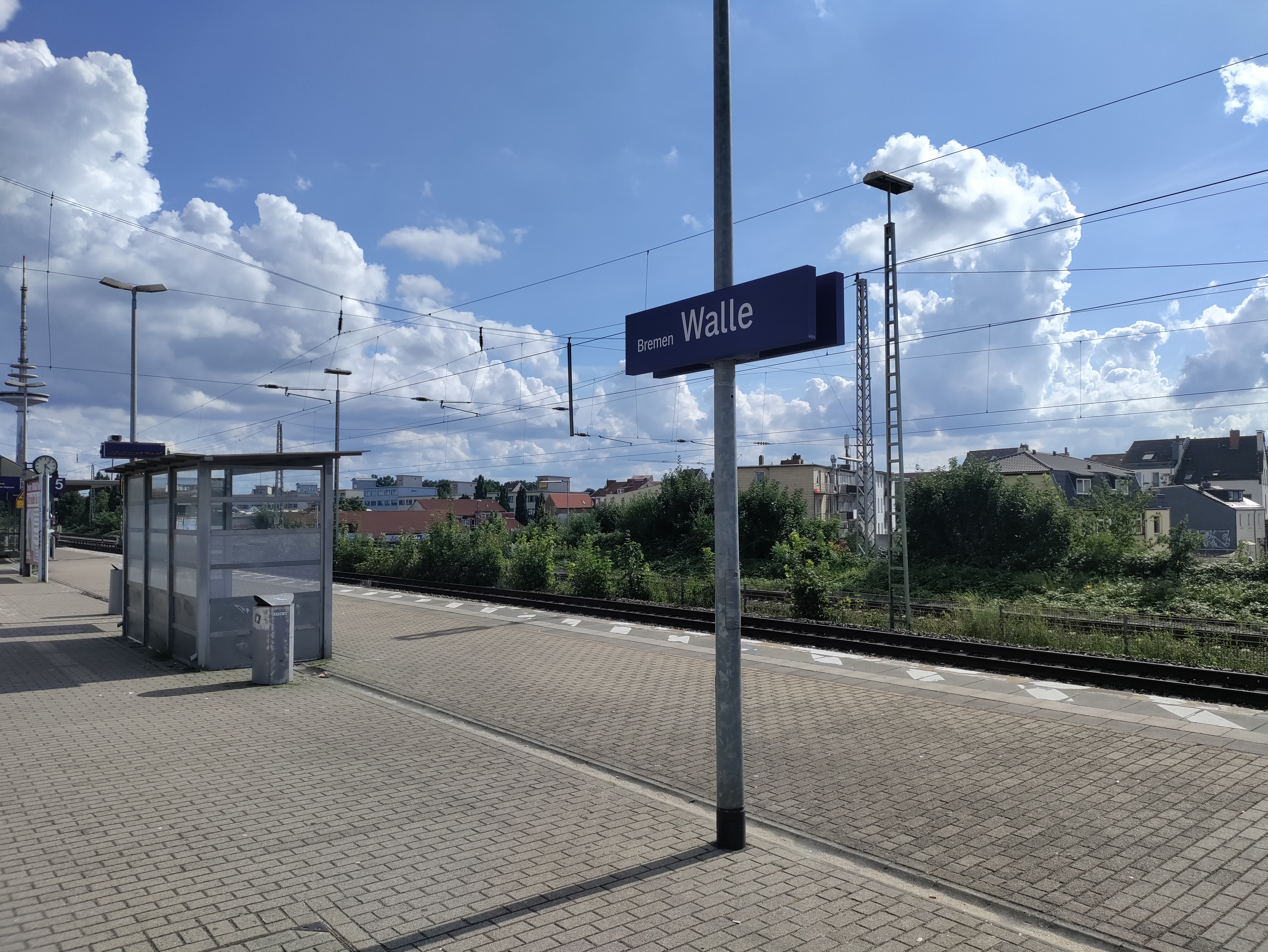
- View from the only platform of the station, when looking southwards

General information
- Location: Walle, Bremen, Bremen; Germany

Other information
- Station code: n/a
- DS100 code: HBWA
- Fare zone: VBN: 100

Services
Preceding station	Bremen S-Bahn	Following station
Bremen-Oslebshausen towards Bremen-Farge	RS1	Bremen Hbf towards Verden (Aller)
Location

Bremen-Walle is a railway station in Bremen, Germany on the Vegesack-Bremen and Bremen–Bremerhaven line. It is situated in the Walle district northwest of the city centre and the central station.

he station is only served by the local, RS1 commuter line operated by NordWestBahn, with the RS2 commuter line to and from Bremerhaven, and longer distance services, passing through without stopping.

The station has an island platform design, with access provided at the southern end down to Osterfeuerberger Ring, a road which the station bridges. The station also has three bypass tracks to the west.

== S-Bahn ==
Currently, the RS1 line connects Bremen-Walle and Bremen Hbf to the south-east every half hour, and every quarter-hour during peak hours. Between 12:30am and 4:30am, the line runs hourly. After reaching Bremen Hbf, trains continue on to Verden every hour, and half-hour at peak periods, with one overnight service.

To the north-west, trains run between Bremen-Walle to Bremen-Vegesack every half hour, and every quarter-hour during peak hours. Between 12:30am and 4:30am, the line runs hourly. After reaching Bremen-Vegesack, trains continue on to Farge every half-hour service between 5am and 12:30am.

The whole S-Bahn Network of the Bremen S-Bahn is part of the VBN.

Line	Route	Frequency			Notes	Length
Line	Route	Peak	Off-peak	Overnight	Notes	Length
RS 1	Bremen-Farge–Bremen-Vegesack	30'	20'	N/a	Trial runs in 2007; part of RS 1 since December 2011	10,4 km
RS 1	Bremen-Walle -Bremen-Vegesack	15'	30'	60'	Opened December 2011	13,5 km
RS 1	Bremen-Walle -Bremen Hbf	15'	30'	60'	Opened December 2011	3,7 km
RS 1	Bremen Hbf–Verden	30'	60'	Infrequent	Opened December 2011	35,7 km

== Bus connections ==
The bus lines 20 (Hohweg - Europahafen), 26 (Kattenturm - Überseestadt) and N7 (Hauptbahnhof - Neuenkirchen) connect to the station on Osterfeuerberger Ring. All lines are operated by the BSAG, and are part of the VBN.
