= Bremen-St. Magnus station =

Railway station in Burglesum, Germany

Coordinates: 53.1715°N 8.6698°E

Bremen St Magnus
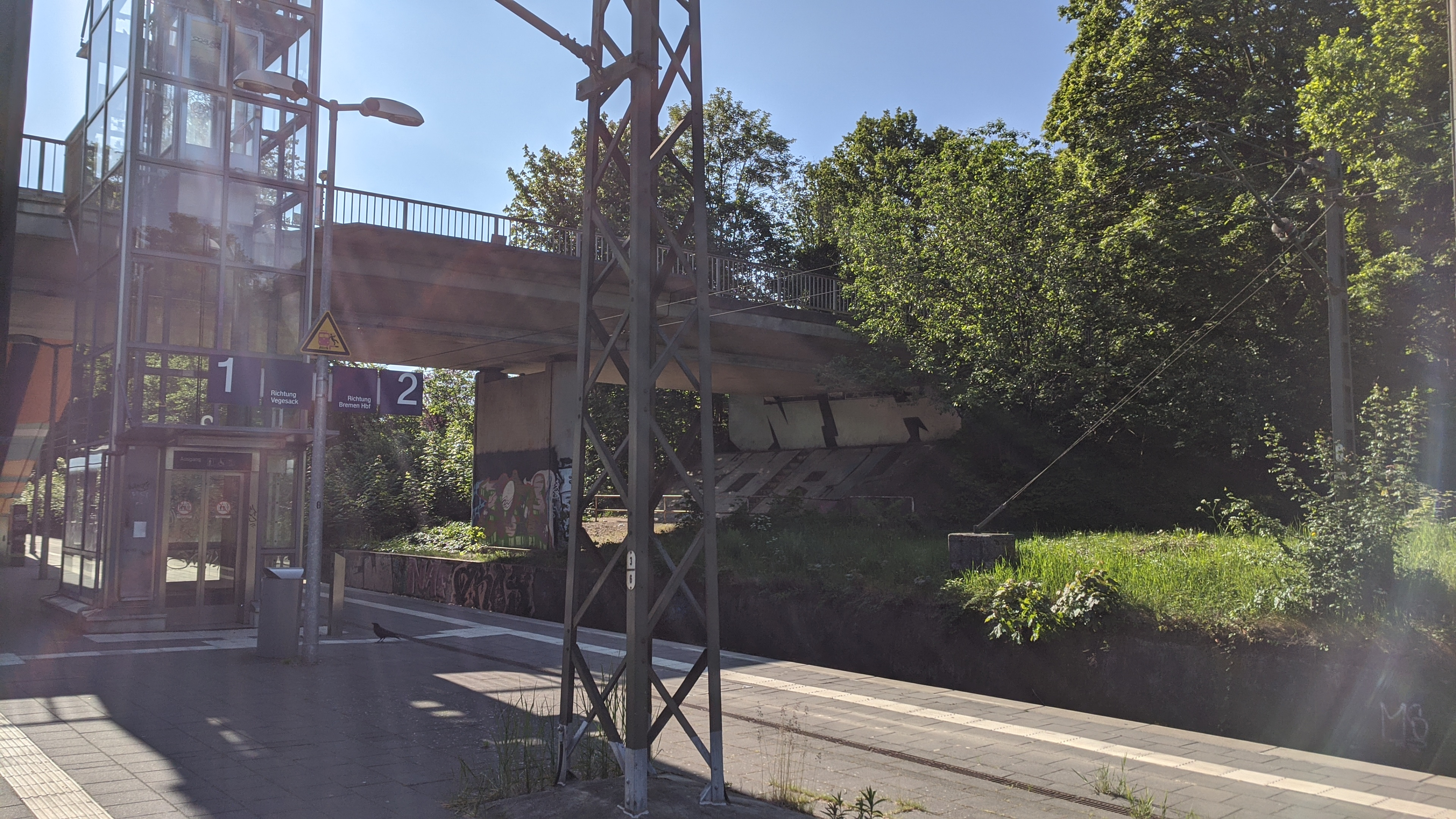
- Bremen-St. Magnus station in 2020

General information
- Location: St. Magnus, Bremen, Bremen; Germany

Other information
- Station code: n/a
- DS100 code: HBMG
- Fare zone: VBN: 101

Services
Preceding station	Bremen S-Bahn	Following station
Bremen-Schönebeck towards Bremen-Farge	RS1	Bremen-Lesum towards Verden (Aller)
Location

Bremen-St Magnus is a railway station serving the St. Magnus district of Bremen, Germany. The station is located on the Bremen-Vegesack–Bremen railway line, served by Bremen S-Bahn line RS1, operated by NordWestBahn.

The station has an island platform design, with access to Am bhf St. Magnus which bridges the station.

== S-Bahn ==
Currently, the RS1 line connects Bremen St Magnus and Bremen Hbf to the south-east every half hour, and every quarter-hour during peak hours. Between 12:30am and 4:30am, the line runs hourly. After reaching Bremen Hbf, trains continue on to Verden every hour, and half-hour at peak periods, with one overnight service.

To the north-west, trains run between Bremen St Magnus to Bremen-Vegesack every half hour, and every quarter-hour during peak hours. Between 12:30am and 4:30am, the line runs hourly. After reaching Bremen-Vegesack, trains continue on to Farge every half-hour service between 5am and 12:30am.

The whole of the Bremen S-Bahn is part of the VBN.

Line	Route	Frequency			Notes	Length
Line	Route	Peak	Off-peak	Overnight	Notes	Length
RS 1	Bremen-Farge–Bremen-Vegesack	30'	20'	N/a	Trial runs in 2007; part of RS 1 since December 2011	10,4 km
RS 1	Bremen St Magnus -Bremen-Vegesack	15'	30'	60'	Opened December 2011	2,8 km
RS 1	Bremen St Magnus -Bremen Hbf	15'	30'	60'	Opened December 2011	14,4 km
RS 1	Bremen Hbf–Verden	30'	60'	Infrequent	Opened December 2011	35,7 km
