= Bremen-Schönebeck station =

Railway station in Vegesack, Germany

Coordinates: 53.1728°N 8.6490°E

Bremen Schönebeck
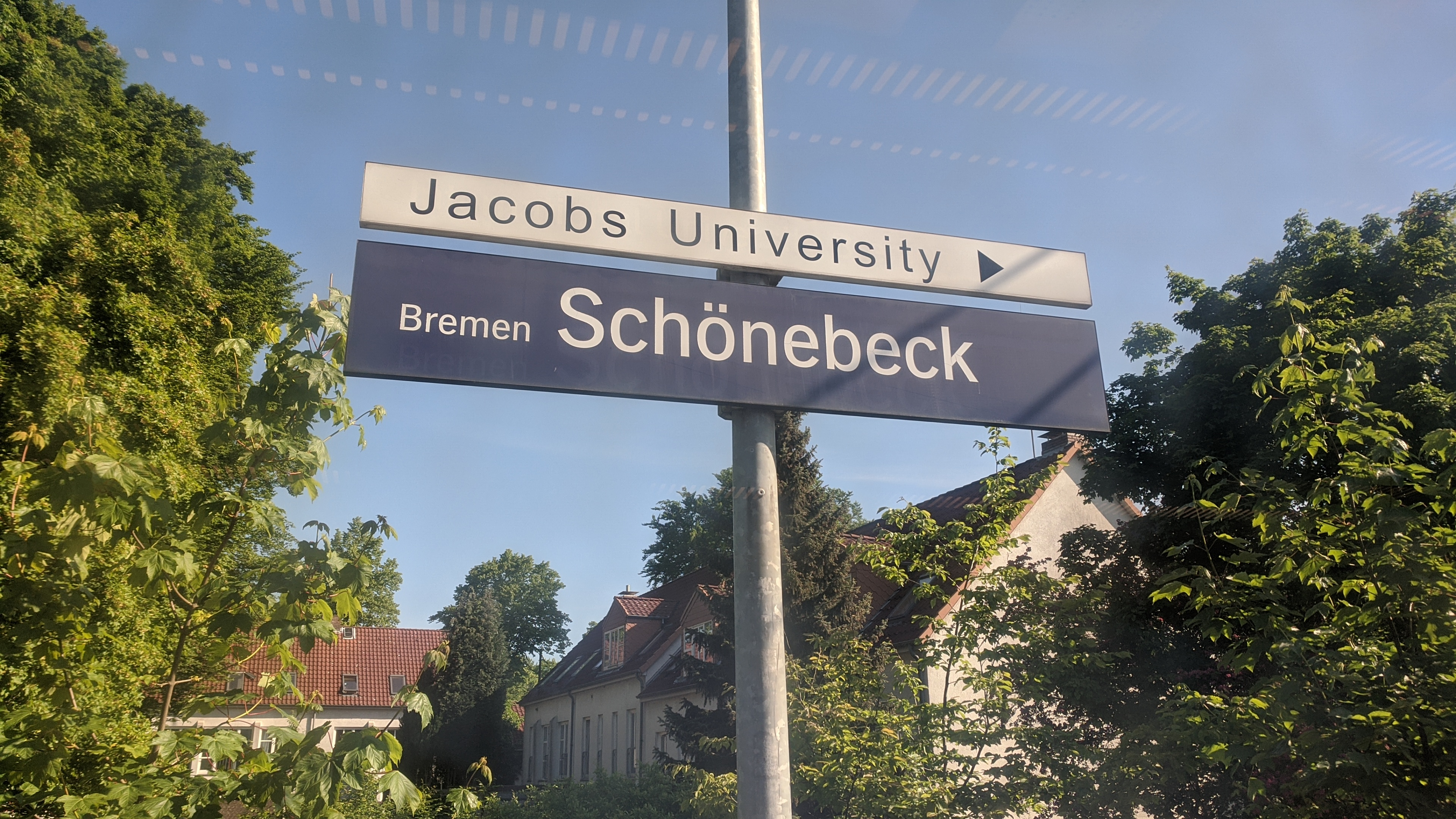
- Bremen-Schönebeck station in 2020 (Jacobs University was renamed to Constructor University in 2022)

General information
- Location: Schönebeck, Bremen, Bremen; Germany

Other information
- Station code: n/a
- DS100 code: HBSC
- Fare zone: VBN: 101

Services
Preceding station	Bremen S-Bahn	Following station
Bremen-Vegesack towards Bremen-Farge	RS1	Bremen-St. Magnus towards Verden (Aller)
Location

Bremen-Schönebeck is a railway station serving the Schönebeck district of Bremen, as well as providing access to the nearby Constructor University. The station is located on the Bremen-Vegesack–Bremen railway line served by Bremen S-Bahn line RS1, operated by NordWestBahn.

The station has a side platform design, with access provided to both platforms from Schönebecker Str. which bridges the station. Additional access is provided to Friedrichsdorfer Bahnweg from platform 2 (towards Bremen-Vegesack), and to Grohner Mühlenweg and the adjacent car park from platform 1 (towards Bremen Hbf).

== S-Bahn ==
Currently, the RS1 line connects Bremen-Schönebeck and Bremen Hbf to the south-east every half hour, and every quarter-hour during peak hours. Between 12:30am and 4:30am, the line runs hourly. After reaching Bremen Hbf, trains continue on to Verden every hour, and half-hour at peak periods, with one overnight service.

To the north-west, trains run between Bremen-Schönebeck to Bremen-Vegesack one station along every half hour, and every quarter-hour during peak hours. Between 12:30am and 4:30am, the line runs hourly. After reaching Bremen-Vegesack, trains continue on to Farge every half-hour service between 5am and 12:30am.

The whole S-Bahn Network of the Bremen S-Bahn is part of the VBN.

Line	Route	Frequency			Notes	Length
Line	Route	Peak	Off-peak	Overnight	Notes	Length
RS 1	Bremen-Farge–Bremen-Vegesack	30'	20'	N/a	Trial runs in 2007; part of RS 1 since December 2011	10,4 km
RS 1	Bremen-Schönebeck-Bremen-Vegesack	15'	30'	60'	Opened December 2011	1,4 km
RS 1	Bremen-Schönebeck-Bremen Hbf	15'	30'	60'	Opened December 2011	15,8 km
RS 1	Bremen Hbf–Verden	30'	60'	Infrequent	Opened December 2011	35,7 km

== Bus connections ==
Bus lines run from Vegesacker Heerstraße, a road 150m to the north.

The bus lines 90 (Neuenkirchen/Rönnebeck - Gröpelingen), 91 and 92 (Rönnebeck - Gröpelingen), as well as N7 (Bremen Hbf–Neuenkirchen) serve the stop, all of which are operated by the BSAG, and are part of the VBN.
