= Osterholz-Scharmbeck station =

Railway station in Osterholz-Scharmbeck, Germany

Osterholz-Scharmbeck
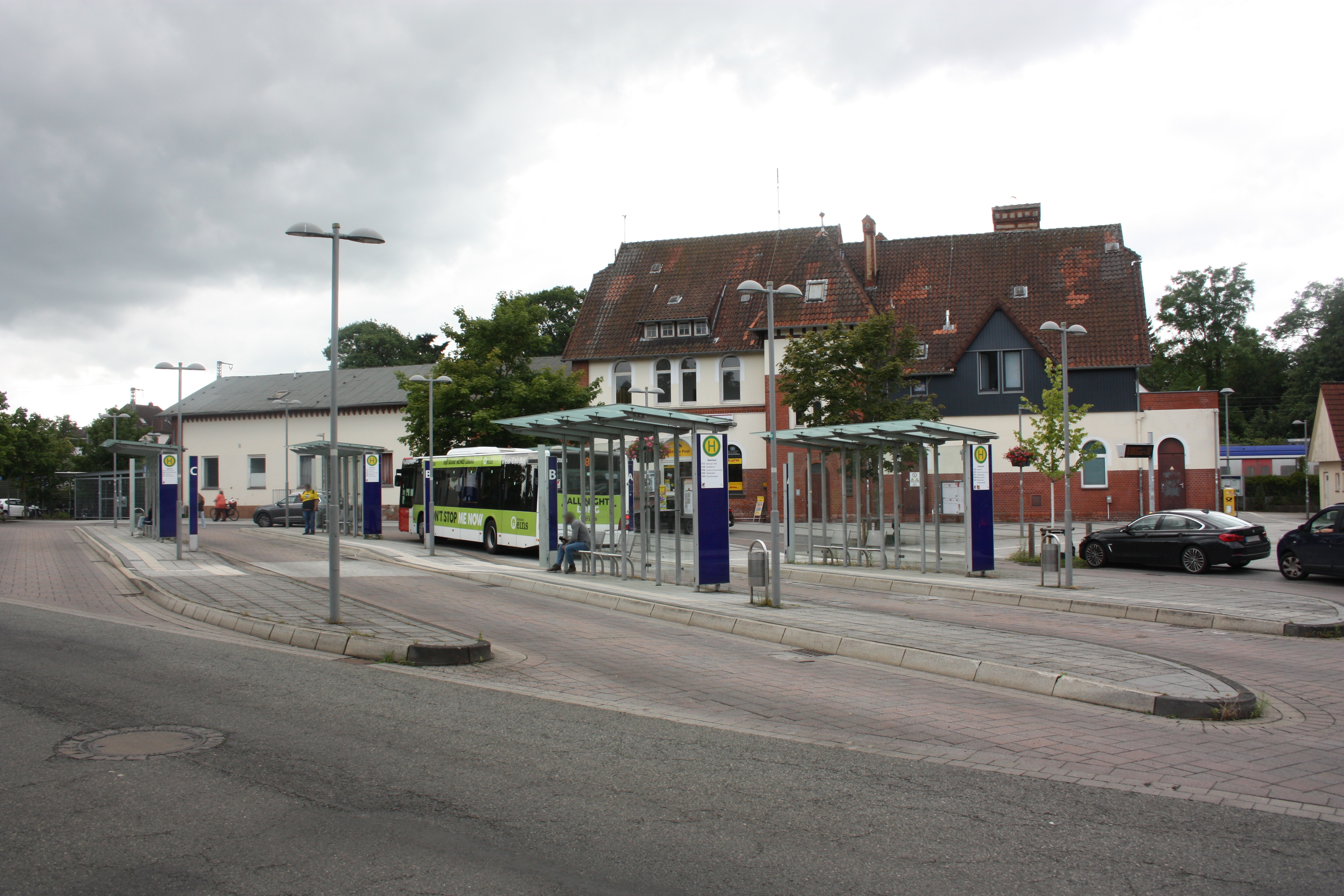
- Osterholz-Scharmbeck railway station

General information
- Location: Osterholz-Scharmbeck, Lower Saxony; Germany
- Coordinates: 53.2225°N 8.7974°E
- Line: Bremen–Bremerhaven railway
- Platforms: 3

Other information
- Station code: n/a
- DS100 code: HOSS
- Fare zone: VBN: 210

Services
Preceding station	DB Regio Nord	Following station
Bremerhaven Hbf towards Bremerhaven-Lehe	RE 8	Bremen Hbf towards Hannover Hbf
Bremerhaven Hbf towards Bremerhaven-Lehe	RE 9	Bremen Hbf towards Osnabrück Hbf
Preceding station	Bremen S-Bahn	Following station
Oldenbüttel towards Bremerhaven-Lehe	RS2	Ritterhude towards Twistringen
Preceding station	EVB	Following station
Ritterhude towards Bremen Hbf	Moor Express	Worpswede towards Stade
Location

Osterholz-Scharmbeck (German: Bahnhof Osterholz-Scharmbeck) is a railway station located in Osterholz-Scharmbeck, Germany. The station is located on the Bremen–Bremerhaven railway. The train services are operated by Deutsche Bahn and NordWestBahn. The station has been part of the Bremen S-Bahn since December 2010.

It is also the point where the Moorexpress heritage railway line to Stade branches off the main line.

== Train services ==
The following services currently call at the station:

- Regional services RE 8 Bremerhaven-Lehe - Bremen - Nienburg - Hanover
- Regional services RE 9 Bremerhaven-Lehe - Bremen - Osnabrück
- Bremen S-Bahn services RS2 Bremerhaven-Lehe - Osterholz-Scharmbeck - Bremen - Twistringen
