= Dreye station =

Railway station in Dreye, Germany

Dreye

General information
- Location: Dreye, Lower Saxony; Germany
- Coordinates: 53.0185°N 8.8712°E
- Line: Wanne-Eickel–Hamburg railway
- Platforms: 2
- Tracks: 2

Other information
- Fare zone: VBN: 509

Services
Preceding station	Bremen S-Bahn	Following station
Bremen-Hemelingen towards Bremerhaven-Lehe	RS2	Kirchweyhe towards Twistringen
Location

Dreye (German: Bahnhof Dreye) is a railway station located in Dreye, Germany. The station is located on the Wanne-Eickel–Hamburg railway and the train services are operated by NordWestBahn. The station has been part of the Bremen S-Bahn since December 2010.

== Train services ==
The station is served by the following services:

- Bremen S-Bahn services RS 2 Bremerhaven-Lehe - Osterholz-Scharmbeck - Bremen - Twistringen
