= Bremen-Hemelingen =

Coordinates: 53.0508°N 8.8994°E

Hemelingen
- District
- Country: Germany
- State: Free Hanseatic City of Bremen
- City: Bremen
- Subdistricts: list: Sebaldsbrück; Hastedt; Hemelingen; Arbergen; Mahndorf

Area
  - Total: 29.77 km^{2} (11.49 sq mi)

Population (2020-12-31)
  - Total: 43,390
  - Density: 1,458/km^{2} (3,775/sq mi)
- Alien population: 14.6%
- Unemployment rate: 11.4%

Hemelingen (Plattdeutsch: Hemeln) is a district of Bremen belonging to the Bremen district East.

== Geography and districts ==
Hemelingen is located about 6 km east of the center of Bremen on the right bank of the Weser. The neighboring districts are the Vahr in the north, Obervieland in the south, the eastern suburb in the west, Osterholz in the east, and the Lower Saxony town of Achim in the southeast.

Hemelingen became a district of Bremen in 1939. It belonged, together with Arbergen and Mahndorf, from 1866 till 1939 to Prussia. Then Hastedt and Sebaldsbrück became subdistricts of Hemelingen, although they were Bremish long before and they never were Prussian.

Hastedt was first mentioned in 1226, Arbergen 1230, Hemelingen 1238 and Mahndorf 1330. The settlement of Sebaldsbrück started after the construction of the railway to Hannover 1847 with the Bremen-Sebaldsbrück railway station. The railway line to Osnabrück with the Bremen-Hemelingen railway station was built in 1873.

BSC Hastedt is a German association football club.

== Industry in Sebaldsbrück ==
The headquarter of Atlas Elektronik is in Sebaldsbrück. The biggest industrial location in Sebaldsbrück is the Bremen plant of Daimler AG, the largest employer in Bremen. Sebaldsbrück was also the home of the Borgward car manufacturing company, defunct 1961.
