= Bremen-Hemelingen station =

Railway station in Hemelingen, Germany

Bremen Hemelingen

General information
- Location: Bremen, Bremen; Germany
- Coordinates: 53.0540°N 8.8871°E
- Line: Wanne-Eickel–Hamburg railway
- Platforms: 2
- Tracks: 2

Other information
- Fare zone: VBN: 100

Services
Preceding station	Bremen S-Bahn	Following station
Bremen Hbf towards Bremerhaven-Lehe	RS2	Dreye towards Twistringen
Location
- Location within Bremen Location within Germany Location within Europe

Bremen-Hemelingen (German: Bahnhof Bremen-Hemelingen) is a railway station located in Bremen, Germany. The station is located in Hemelingen on the Wanne-Eickel–Hamburg railway and the train services are operated by NordWestBahn. The station has been part of the Bremen S-Bahn since December 2010.

== Train services ==
The station is served by the following services:

- Bremen S-Bahn services RS 2 Bremerhaven-Lehe - Osterholz-Scharmbeck - Bremen - Twistringen
