= Bremen-Sebaldsbrück station =

Railway station in Bremen, Germany

Bremen Sebaldsbrück
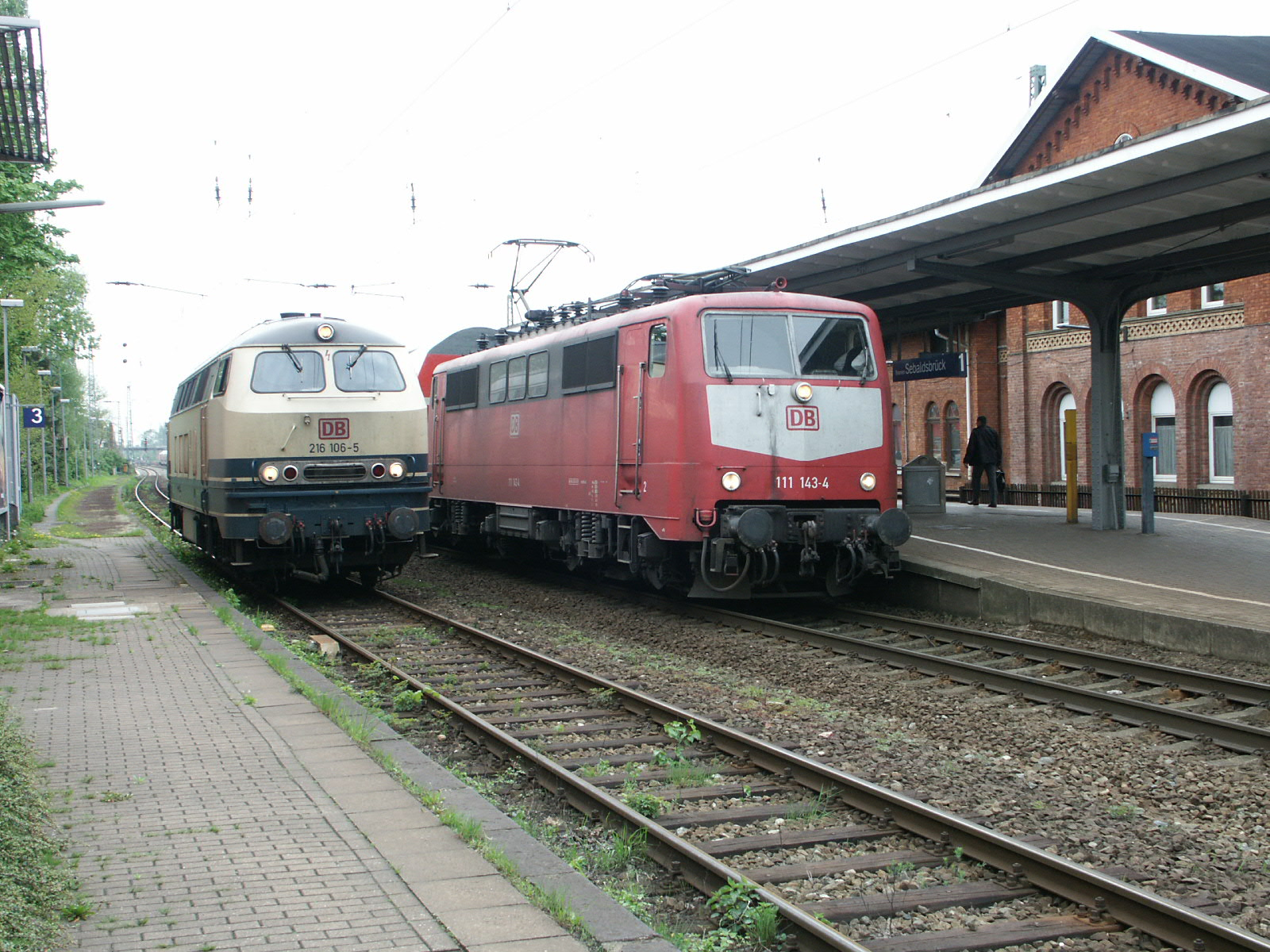
- Bremen-Sebaldsbrück railway station

General information
- Location: Bremen, Bremen; Germany
- Coordinates: 53.0340°N 8.5315°E
- Owner: Deutsche Bahn
- Operator: DB Netz; DB Station&Service
- Line: Bremen–Hanover railway
- Platforms: 2
- Tracks: 4

Other information
- Fare zone: VBN: 100

Services
Preceding station	Bremen S-Bahn	Following station
Bremen Hbf towards Bremen-Farge	RS1	Bremen-Mahndorf towards Verden (Aller)
Location

Bremen-Sebaldsbrück (German: Bahnhof Bremen-Sebaldsbrück) is a railway station located in Bremen, Germany. The station is located on the Bremen–Hanover railway. The train services are operated by NordWestBahn. The station has been part of the Bremen S-Bahn since December 2010.

== Train services ==
The following services currently call at the station:

- Bremen S-Bahn services RS1 Bremen-Farge - Bremen-Vegesack - Bremen - Verden
