= Bremerhaven Hauptbahnhof =

Railway station in Geestemünde, Germany

Bremerhaven Hbf
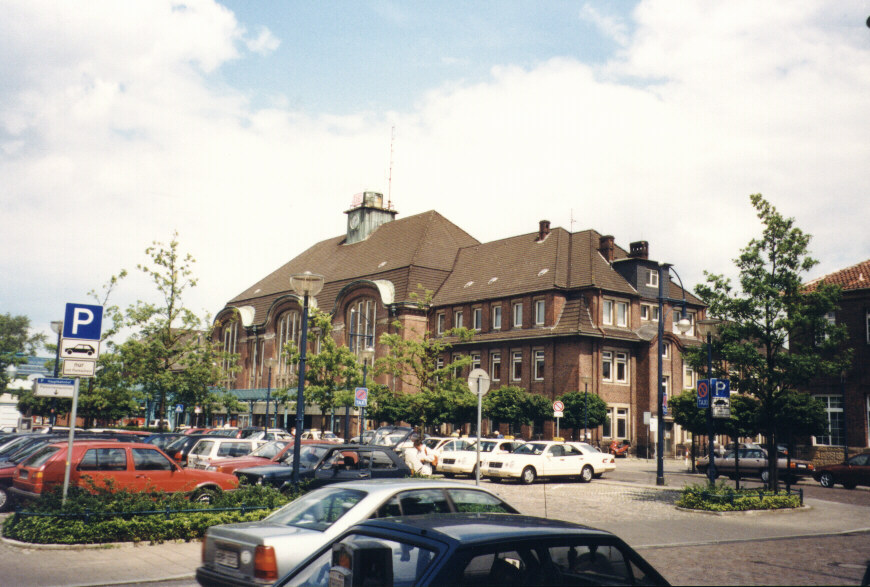
- Station building in 1998

General information
- Location: Friedrich-Ebert-Straße 73; 27570 Bremerhaven; Geestemünde, Bremerhaven, Free Hanseatic City of Bremen; Germany
- Coordinates: 53°32′06″N 8°35′58″E
- Owner: Deutsche Bahn
- Operator: DB Netz; DB Station&Service
- Lines: Bremen–Bremerhaven (KBS 125); Bremerhaven-Lehe–Buxtehude (KBS 122); Bremerhaven–Cuxhaven (KBS 125)
- Platforms: 4

Other information
- Station code: 0868
- DS100 code: HBH
- IBNR: 00051
- Category: 3
- Fare zone: VBN: 250
- Website: www.bahnhof.de

History
- Opened: 1914
- Electrified: 1966
- Former names: Geestemünde-Bremerhaven (1914-1924); Wesermünde-Bremerhaven (1924-1947)

Services
Preceding station	DB Regio Nord	Following station
Bremerhaven-Lehe Terminus	RE 8	Osterholz-Scharmbeck towards Hannover Hbf
Bremerhaven-Lehe Terminus	RE 9	Osterholz-Scharmbeck towards Osnabrück Hbf
Preceding station	EVB	Following station
Bremerhaven-Lehe towards Cuxhaven	RB 33	Bremerhaven-Wulsdorf towards Buxtehude
Preceding station	Bremen S-Bahn	Following station
Bremerhaven-Lehe Terminus	RS2	Bremerhaven-Wulsdorf towards Twistringen
Preceding station	Museumsbahn Bremerhaven-Bederkesa	Following station
Bremerhaven-Lehe towards Bad Bederkesa	Bremerhaven–Bederkesa	Terminus
Location

Bremerhaven Hauptbahnhof is a railway station in the city of Bremerhaven in northwestern Germany. It is the main railway hub for the city, offering regional connections to Bremen, Osnabrück, Cuxhaven, Bremervörde and Buxtehude. Museal services on the line to Bad Bederkesa also call at the station during weekends in summer.

== History ==
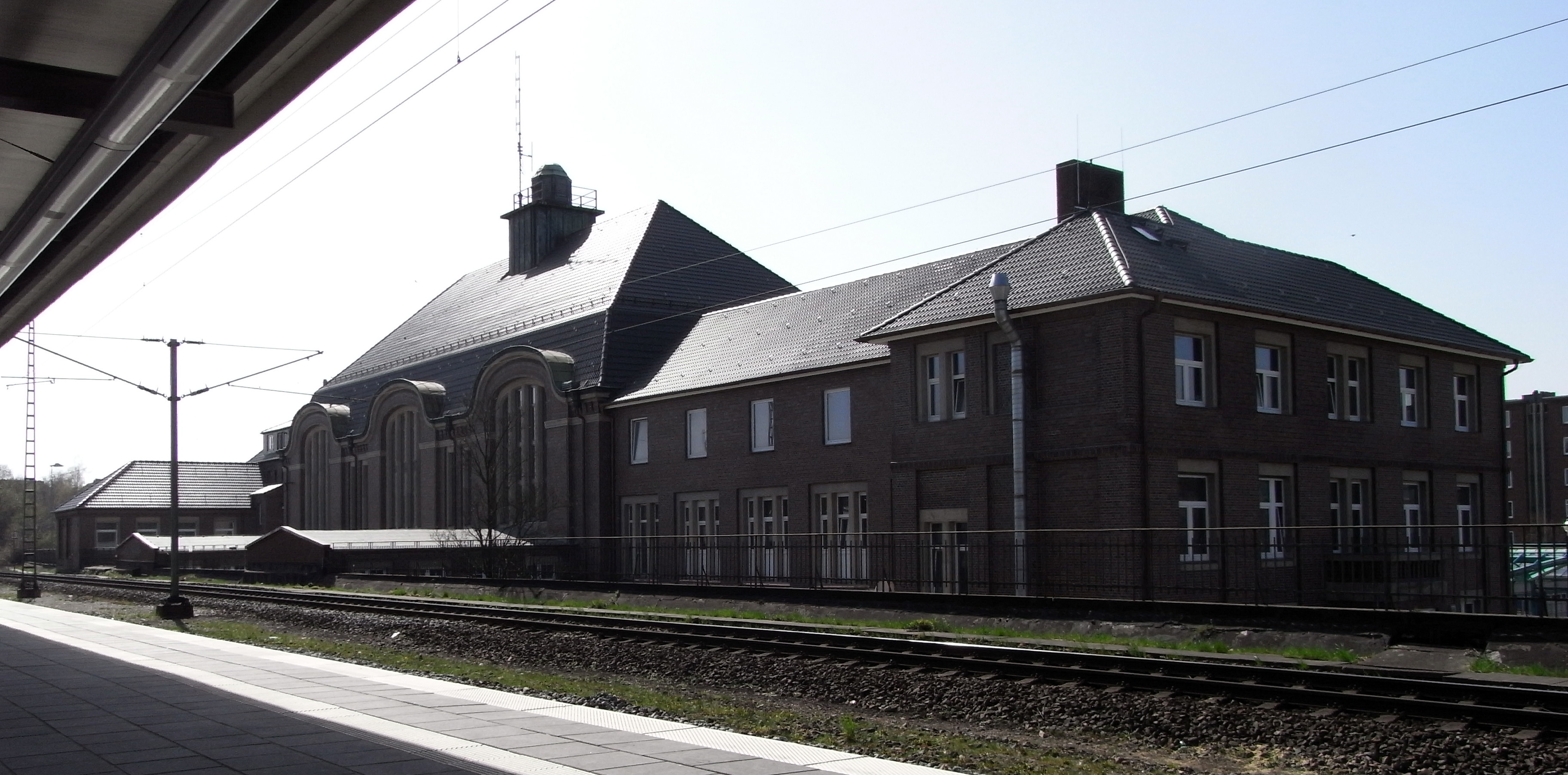
The rear of the station building

First plans to build a railway link between Bremerhaven and Bremen were laid out as early as the 1850s. From 1859 to 1862, a line was built with a terminal station at Geestemünde (now a borough of Bremerhaven). In 1896, the railway line to Cuxhaven was built, also connecting to the terminus station. Due to an increase in traffic, it was decided to abandon the old station and build a new one, because the old one, connected with single-track, can't be increased, and on July 1, 1914, the new station, then called Geestemünde-Bremerhaven, was opened together with a new, grade-separated line to Lehe and Cuxhaven.

When Geestemünde and Lehe were merged to form Wesermünde in 1924, the station was renamed to Wesermünde-Bremerhaven. The station building survived World War II, but the station hall was pulled down in the early 70's - having survived the railway electrification in 1966. The station name changed again when Wesermünde was renamed to Bremerhaven in 1947, and the station became known as Bremerhaven Hauptbahnhof. Due to the US Army barracks in Bremerhaven, there were also regular military train services, as well as official duty trains to Berlin during the Cold War.

From the mid-1990s to 2000, there used to be a daily InterCityExpress service to Munich, leaving Bremerhaven in the morning and arriving in the evening. This service was abandoned, leaving the station without long-distance services ever since.

== Renovation plans ==
Deutsche Bahn, along with the city government, have laid out plans to renovate the station. Renovation will include remodeling the platforms, raising them to improve accessibility, as well as removing one of the two staircases per platform and replacing them with a lift. The station subway will also be renovated, as will the entrance hall. Renovation is estimated to be finished by 2009 and first was budgeted at € 8.2 million, of which the state Free Hanseatic City of Bremen was supposed to pay 3.8 million. With this budget, it would not have been possible to fully restore the station hall, however, and lobbyist groups have called for additional funding to allow the removal of the hall's current low ceiling. After negotiations, the Deutsche Bahn announced to rise its share of the €8.2 million fund to €800,000 on the condition that the city of Bremerhaven would pay €600,000 to allow for the renovation of the entrance hall. The planned shortening of the station platforms to 210 metres is regarded as controversial, as city officials fear this will cut the station off the long-distance network indefinitely. DB, however, has claimed that even with a 210 m platform, a single ICE 2 unit could still call at the station, as these units are 205 metres long.

== Train services ==
The following services currently call at the station:

- Regional services RE 8 Bremerhaven-Lehe - Bremen - Nienburg - Hanover
- Regional services RE 9 Bremerhaven-Lehe - Bremen - Osnabrück
- Local services RB 33 Buxtehude - Bremervörde - Bremerhaven - Dorum - Cuxhaven
- Bremen S-Bahn services RS2 Bremerhaven-Lehe - Osterholz-Scharmbeck - Bremen - Twistringen

== Operational usage ==
Services operated by DB Regio, EVB and Bremen S-Bahn call at the station. It is also frequently passed by freight trains to and from the Bremerhaven seaport, a special through track exists for these trains. There are to RegionalExpress connections to Osnabrück Hbf and Hannover Hbf via Bremen Hbf, served by modern double decker trains. The other connections are local only, operated by the Bremen S-Bahn and by the EVB using DMUs, as the lines to Buxtehude and Cuxhaven are not electrified. The next station to the north is Bremerhaven-Lehe, the next station to the south is Bremerhaven-Wulsdorf.

== See also ==
- List of railway stations in Bremen
- Rail transport in Germany
