= Bremen-Vegesack station =

Railway station in Vegesack, Germany

Coordinates: 53.1695°N 8.6291°E

Bremen Vegesack
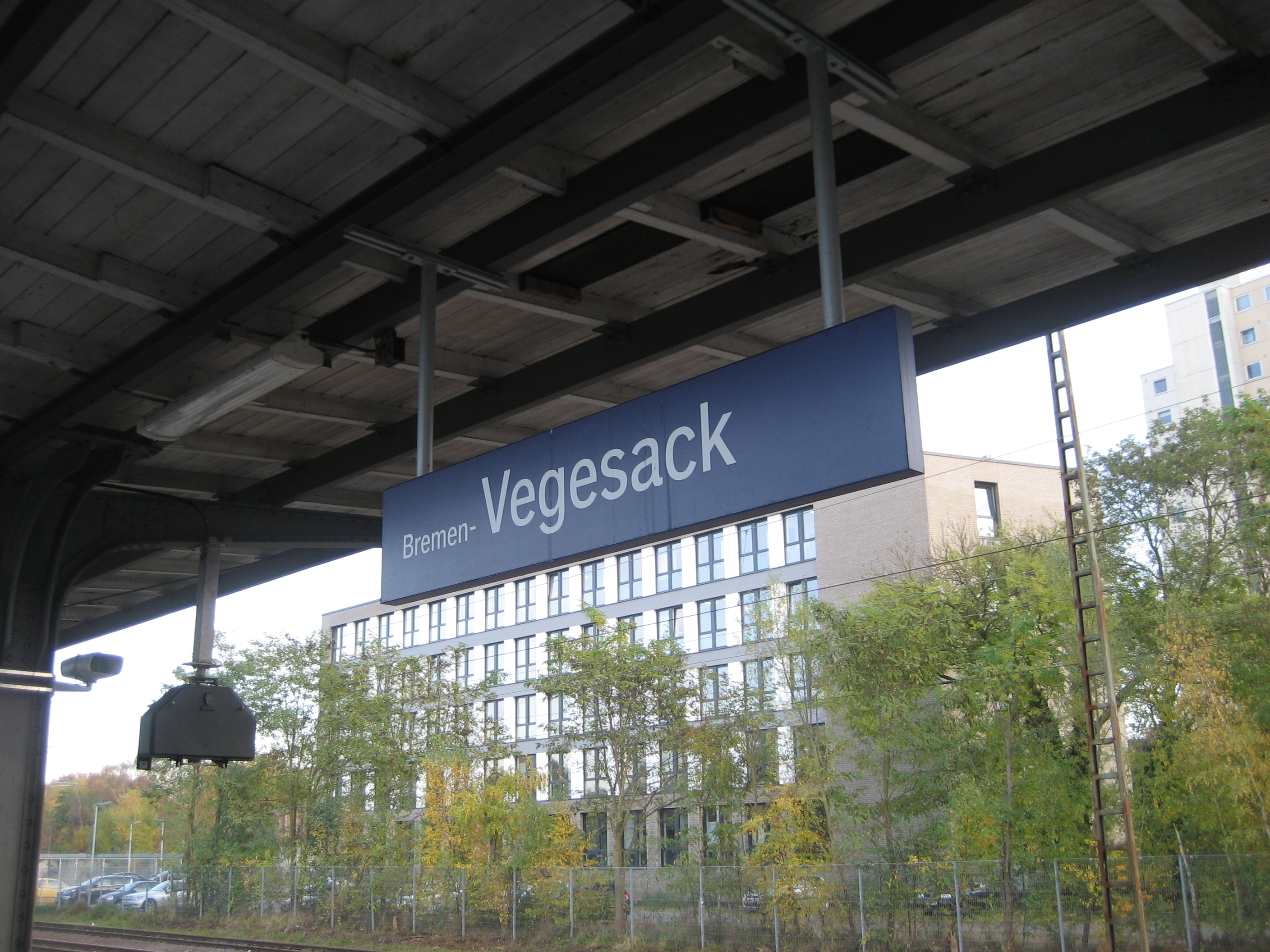
- 2015

General information
- Location: Vegesack, Bremen, Bremen; Germany

Other information
- Station code: n/a
- DS100 code: HBV
- Fare zone: VBN: 101

History
- Opened: 1862
- Electrified: 1967

Services
Preceding station	Bremen S-Bahn	Following station
Bremen-Aumund towards Bremen-Farge	RS1	Bremen-Schönebeck towards Verden (Aller)
Location

Bremen-Vegesack is a railway station serving the Vegesack district of Bremen. The station is part of the Bremen-Farge and the Bremen-Vegesack–Bremen railway line railway lines served by Bremen S-Bahn line RS1, operated by NordWestBahn.

The station is a bay platform design, with non-terminating trains reversing out of the station to continue their journey. Access to the station is provided from Vegesacker Bahnhofspl, a square with local bus connections and a vehicle drop-off area. There is also a carpark nearby.

== S-Bahn ==
Currently, the RS1 line connects Bremen-Vegesack and Bremen Hbf to the south-east every half hour, and every quarter-hour during peak hours. Between 12:30am and 4:30am, the line runs hourly. After reaching Bremen Hbf, trains continue on to Verden every hour, and half-hour at peak periods, with one overnight service.

In the other direction, trains run between Vegesack and Farge to the north-west every half-hour between 5am and 12:30am.

The whole S-Bahn Network of the Bremen S-Bahn is part of the VBN.

Line	Route	Frequency			Notes	Length
Line	Route	Peak	Off-peak	Overnight	Notes	Length
RS 1	Bremen-Farge–Bremen-Vegesack	30'	30'	N/a	Trial runs in 2007; part of RS 1 since December 2011	10,4 km
RS 1	Bremen-Vegesack–Bremen Hbf	15'	30'	60'	Opened December 2011	17,2 km
RS 1	Bremen Hbf–Verden	30'	60'	Infrequent	Opened December 2011	35,7 km

== Bus connections ==
Bus lines run from the station square.

The bus lines 90 (Gröpelingen–Neuenkirchen), 91 and 92 (Gröpelingen–Rönnebeck), 94 (Gröpelingen–Bockhorn (or the depot in Blumenthal)) and 98 (Vegesack–Hammersbeck station) as well as N7 (main station–Neuenkirchen) are operated by the BSAG and as well the lines N8 (Vegesack–Schwanewede) and 677 (Vegesack–Uthlede) and N61 (Vegesack–Hagen). All bus lines are part of the VBN.
