= Bremen–Bremerhaven railway =

Railway line connecting Bremen and Bremerhaven

Bremen–Bremerhaven

Overview
- Line number: 1740
- Locale: Bremen and Lower Saxony, Germany

Service
- Route number: 125

Technical
- Track gauge: 1,435 mm (4 ft 8 1/2 in) standard gauge

The Bremen–Bremerhaven railway line is a railway line connecting the German cities Bremen and Bremerhaven. It is an entirely two-track and electrified mainline railway that is operated Deutsche Bahn. It is designed for speeds of up to 160 km/h. In section from Bremen Hauptbahnhof to Bremerhaven Hauptbahnhof is 62.0 km long, but its extension via Bremerhaven-Lehe to the Bremerhaven-Speckenbüttel marshalling yard and on to Columbus quay is also often included. The most important intermediate station is Osterholz-Scharmbeck, where Regional-Express trains also stop.

The line was fully opened on 23 January 1862 jointly by the Royal Hanoverian State Railways and Bremen. Today it mostly sees freight traffic and local passenger trains. The last long-distance trains were InterRegio trains on the line Cuxhaven-Luxembourg that were discontinued in 2001.

== Current operations ==
The line has no long distance services. Until 2001, it had several long distance trains, including InterRegio, Intercity and Intercity-Express trains. An Intercity-Express running between Bremerhaven and Munich and InterRegio trains between Cuxhaven and Luxembourg and Saarbrücken are recent examples.

Regional-Express services run on the Bremerhaven–Bremen–Osnabrück line at 2-hour intervals (in peak hours trains operate hourly). Since December 2010, line RS 2 of the Bremen S-Bahn runs hourly between Bremerhaven-Lehe and Twistringen.

In addition the line is used by a large amount of freight traffic, particularly for the transport of containers and cars to and from the Bremerhaven ports.

The line used to be also called the Geeste Railway (German: Geestebahn, after the Geeste river, where it ended). This name was however also used for the Bremerhaven–Buxtehude railway (west of Bremervörde), which is closer to the river.

== History ==
The route was a hard-fought compromise between Hanover and the Free Hanseatic City of Bremen, then independent countries. Around 1850, people from Vegesack and Blumenthal argued for a direct connection to the Weser estuary. This was expected to promote the development of the villages of the marshes on the eastern shore of the lower Weser (the Osterstade). Hanover, however, preferred a route via Lesum, Scharmbeck and Beverstedt. It would be possible to build a branch from Beverstedt towards Hamburg, making Hanoverian Geestemünde a winter port for Hamburg. Bremen proposed as a compromise a route roughly along today's federal highway B 6, which was built between 1817 and 1839. Finally, both countries agreed to split the difference, so that the line runs near Stubben and Loxstedt.

The end of the line was originally in Geestemünde, now a district of Bremerhaven, but then not part of Bremen. The port of Bremerhaven (and since 1896 the first part of the Bremerhaven–Cuxhaven line) was connected from a junction just before the end of the line. In 1914 this became the route to today's Bremerhaven Hauptbahnhof, originally called Geestemünde-Bremerhaven station.

== Gallery ==
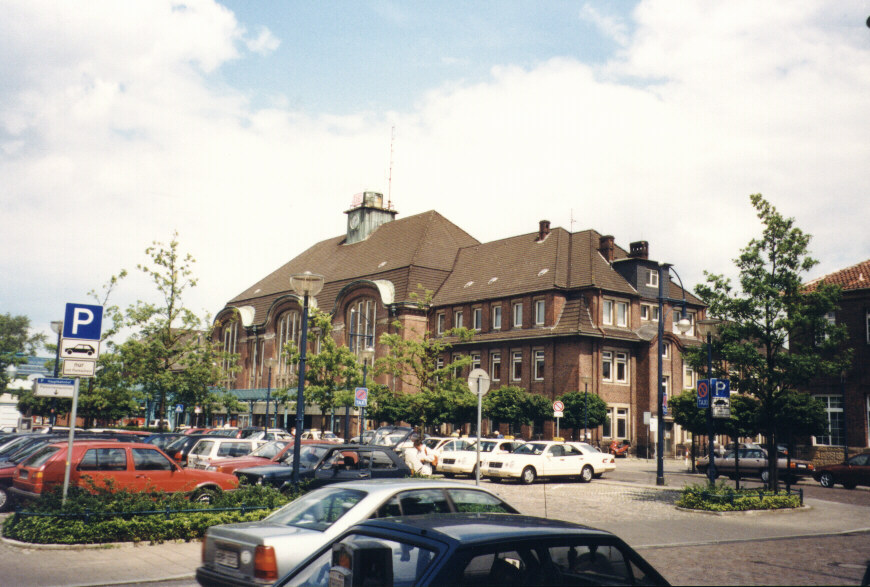
Bremerhaven Hbf

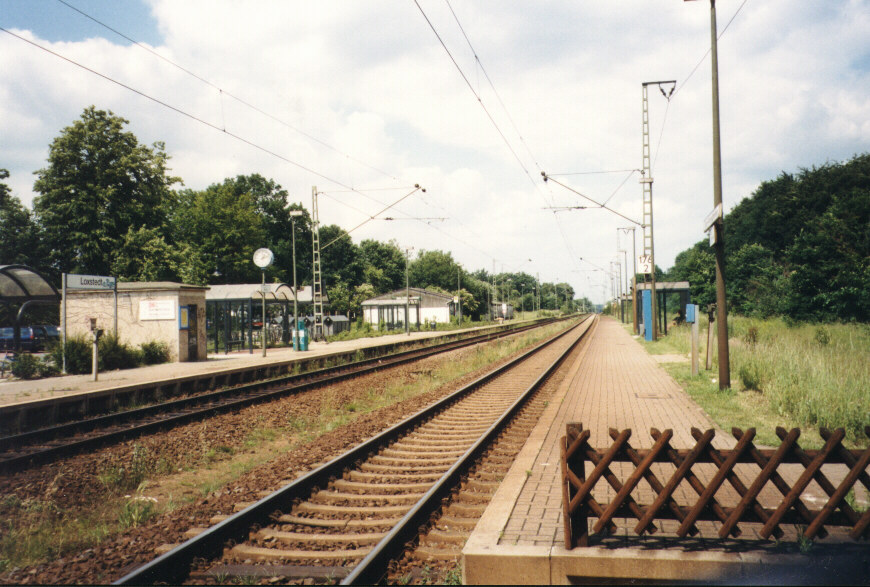
Loxstedt

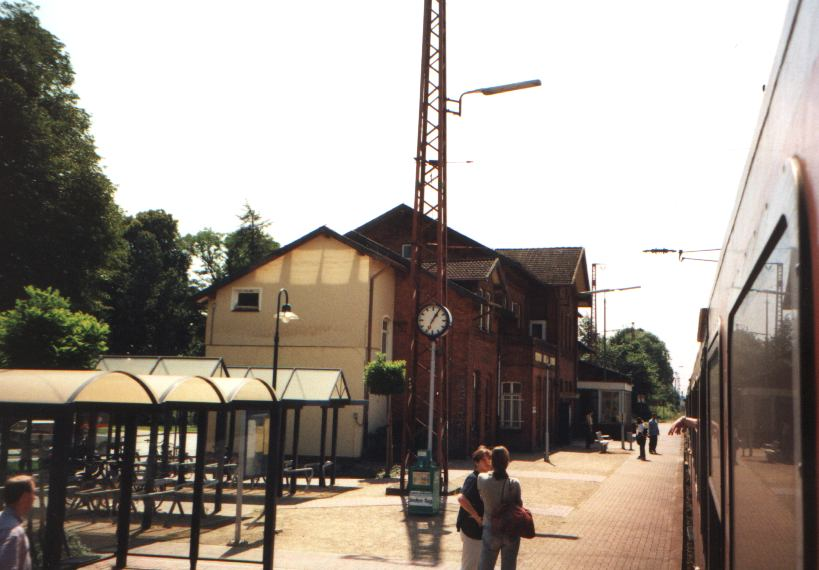
Stubben

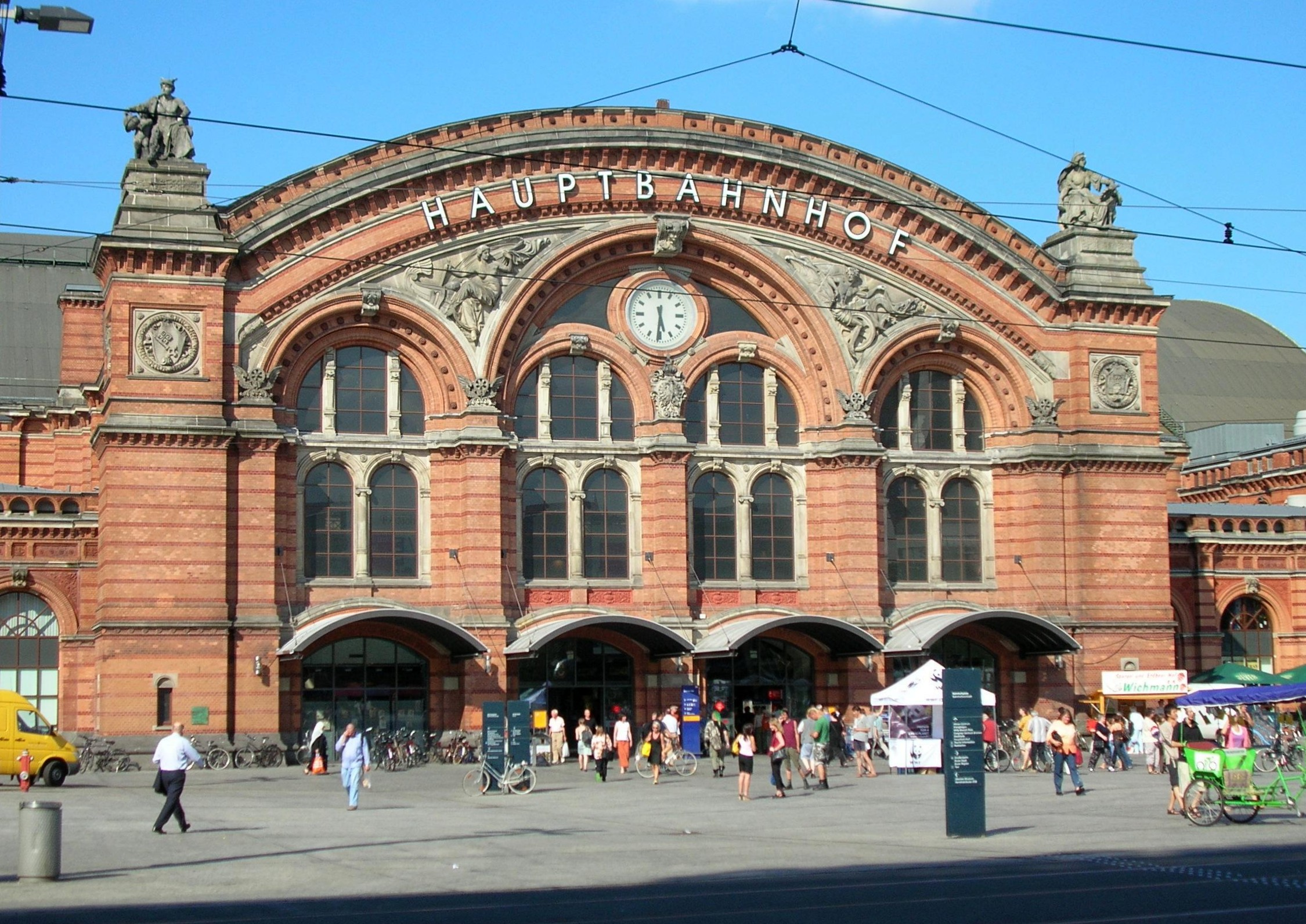
Bremen Hbf

== Bibliography ==
- Hans Heinrich Seedorf (1968). Der Landkreis Wesermünde (in German). Bremen: Walter Dorn Verlag.
- Walter Bollen (2006). Bahnhof am Meer: Die Eisenbahn an der Unterweser (in German). Bremen: Hauschild Verlag. ISBN 978-3-89757-343-7.
