= Moor Express =

Bremen–Stade railway
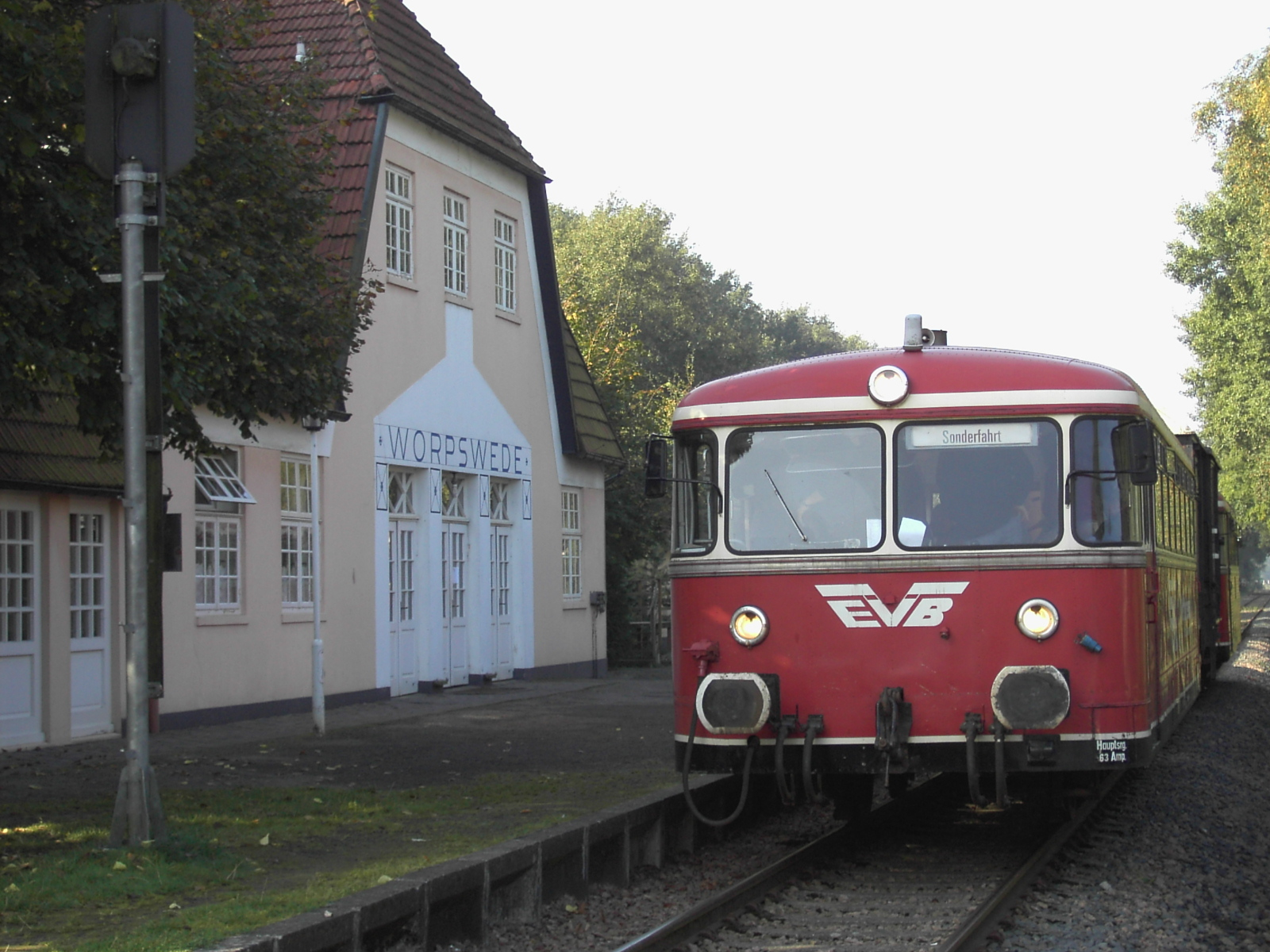
- The Moor Express at Worpswede station

Overview
- Line number: 1260 Bremervörde–Stade; 9132 Bremervörde–Osterholz

Service
- Route number: 12121, ex 217b (Bremervörde–Stade) ex 217f (Bremervörde–Osterholz)

Technical
- Track gauge: 1,435 mm
- Operating speed: 60 km/h max.

The Moor Express or Moorexpress is a heritage railway in the northern part of Lower Saxony in Germany. It runs between Stade and Osterholz-Scharmbeck passing through Bremervörde, Gnarrenburg and Worpswede.

== Services ==
- Tickets for the special rail services, which run between May and October, can be purchased directly from the guard in the train or at tourist bureaux and travel agents in the region.
- Bicycles may be carried.
- Since 2006 the Moor Express has run to Bremen Hauptbahnhof ("Bremen Central Station").
- The Moor Express is not part of the Verkehrsverbund Bremen-Niedersachsen (VBN) nor the Hamburger Verkehrsverbund (HVV).
- Infotrail have provided an audio guide. Passengers are able to hear information, interviews and the history of the line and the local region on MP3 players.

== Literature ==
- Lutz Schadeck: Der Moorexpress - Unterwegs zwischen Stade und Bremen. Verlag Atelier im Bauernhaus, Fischerhude 2009, ISBN 978-3-88132-095-5
- Peter Elze, Karl-Robert Schütze: Der Moorexpress. Worpsweder Verlag, 2. Auflage 1984
- Dieter-Theodor Bohlmann: Die Eisenbahnen und Verkehrsbetriebe Elbe-Weser. Zeunert, Gifhorn 1984, ISBN 3-924335-51-6
- Gerd Wolff: Deutsche Klein- und Privatbahnen Band 10: Niedersachsen 2. EK-Verlag, Freiburg 2007, ISBN 978-3-88255-669-8
