= Schwanewede =

- Municipality
- Coat of arms

- Location of Schwanewede within Osterholz district
- Interactive map of Schwanewede
- Location within Germany Location within Lower Saxony
- Coordinates: 53°14′N 08°36′E
- Country: Germany
- State: Lower Saxony
- District: Osterholz
- Subdivisions: 12 districts

Government
  - Mayor (2020–25): Christina Jantz-Herrmann (SPD)

Area
  - Total: 132.57 km^{2} (51.19 sq mi)
- Elevation: 15 m (49 ft)

Population (2025-12-31)
  - Total: 19,918
  - Density: 150.25/km^{2} (389.13/sq mi)
- Time zone: UTC+01:00 (CET)
  - Summer (DST): UTC+02:00 (CEST)
- Postal codes: 28790
- Dialling codes: 04209
- Vehicle registration: OHZ
- Website: www.schwanewede.de

Schwanewede (German pronunciation: [ˈʃvaːnəveːdə]) is a municipality in the district of Osterholz, in Lower Saxony, Germany. It is situated approximately 14 km west of Osterholz-Scharmbeck, and 22 km northwest of Bremen.

It belonged to the Prince-Archbishopric of Bremen. In 1648, the Prince-Archbishopric was transformed into the Duchy of Bremen, which Sweden first ruled over in a personal union. In 1715, the Hanoverian Crown started to rule over Schwanwede until 1823, in which the Duchy was abolished, leading all of its territory to become part of the Stade Region.

Schwanewede consists of 12 smaller villages which form the municipality of Schwanewede, namely Beckedorf, Löhnhorst, Meyenburg, Aschwarden, Neuenkirchen, Brundorf, Eggestedt, Harriersand, Hinnebeck, Leuchtenburg and Rade.

The Farge concentration camp is located in Schwanewede-Neuenkirchen.
