= Bremen Hauptbahnhof =

Railway station in Bremen, northwest Germany

Bremen Hbf
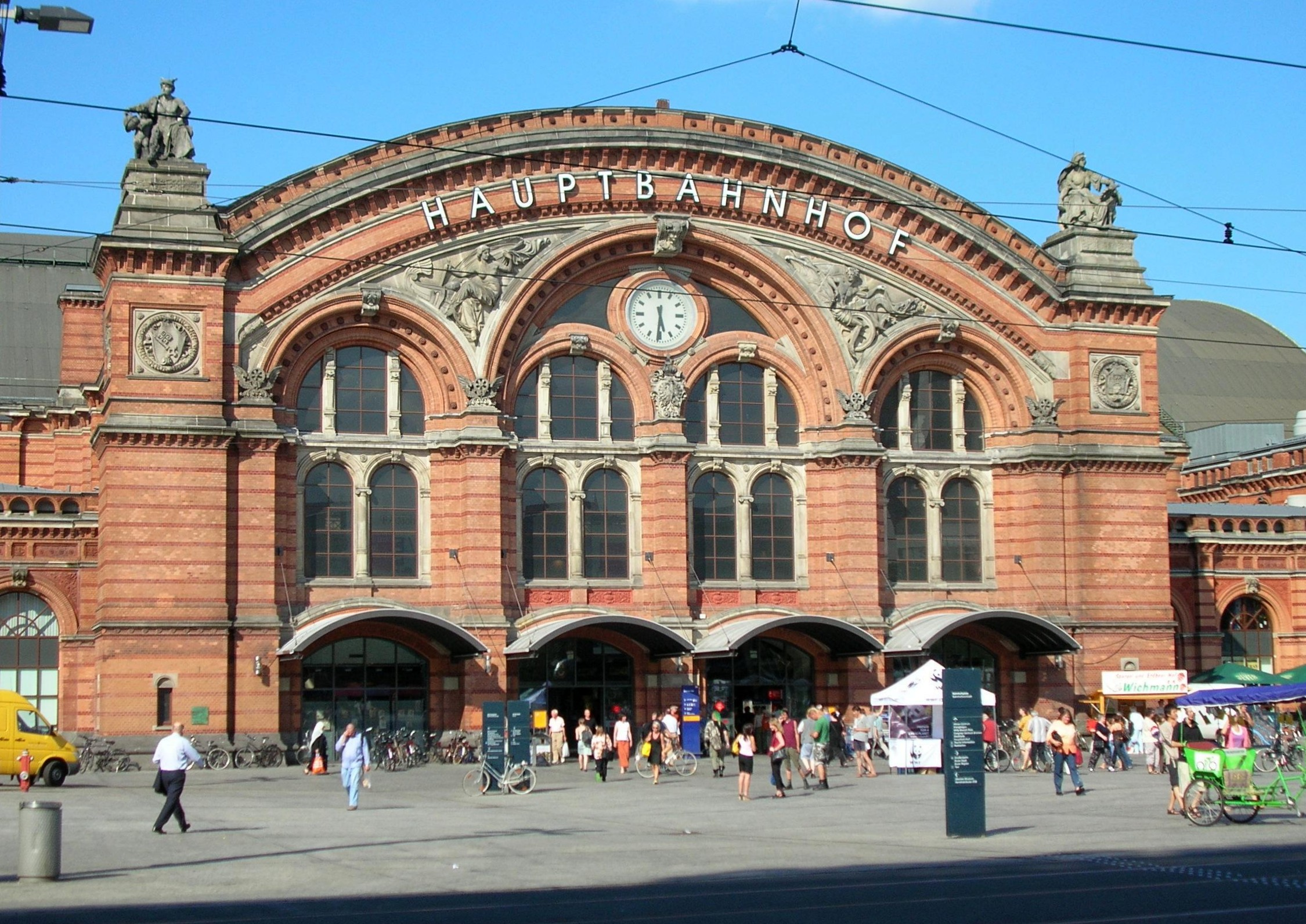
- Front of station hall

General information
- Location: Bremen, Free Hanseatic City of Bremen; Germany
- Coordinates: 53°05′03″N 8°48′42″E
- Owner: Deutsche Bahn
- Operator: DB Netz; DB Station&Service
- Lines: Wanne-Eickel–Hamburg line; Bremen–Hanover line; Oldenburg–Bremen line; Bremen–Bremerhaven line; Bremen-Vegesack–Bremen line
- Platforms: 9

Construction
- Accessible: Yes

Other information
- Station code: 855
- DS100 code: HB
- Category: 2
- Fare zone: Verkehrsverbund Bremen/Niedersachsen: 100
- Website: www.bahnhof.de

History
- Opened: 12 December 1847; 178 years ago
- Electrified: 14 December 1964; 61 years ago
- Former names: 1847-1873 Bremen; 1873-1889 Bremen Staatsbahnhof; 1889-1897 Bremen Centralbahnhof

Key dates
- 1870: Rollbahn opened
- 1886-89: Current hall built
Services
Preceding station	DB Fernverkehr	Following station
Delmenhorst towards Oldenburg Hbf	ICE 16	Hannover Hbf towards Berlin Südkreuz
Terminus	ICE 19	Hannover Hbf towards Berlin Ostbahnhof
Oldenburg Hbf Terminus	ICE 22	Hannover Hbf One-way operation
Delmenhorst towards Oldenburg Hbf	ICE 26	Hannover Hbf towards Karlsruhe Hbf
Hamburg Hbf towards Westerland (Sylt)	ICE 33	Osnabrück Hbf towards Köln Hbf
Hamburg-Harburg towards Hamburg-Altona	ICE 42	Osnabrück Hbf towards München Hbf
Hamburg-Harburg towards Hamburg-Altona	ICE 43	Osnabrück Hbf towards Basel SBB, Chur or Brig
Delmenhorst towards Norddeich Mole	IC 56	Verden (Aller) towards Leipzig Hbf or Cottbus Hbf
Preceding station	DB Regio Nord	Following station
Delmenhorst towards Norddeich Mole	RE 1	Achim towards Hannover Hbf
Osterholz-Scharmbeck towards Bremerhaven-Lehe	RE 8	Achim towards Hannover Hbf
Osterholz-Scharmbeck towards Bremerhaven-Lehe	RE 9	Kirchweyhe towards Osnabrück Hbf
Preceding station	Metronom	Following station
Terminus	RE 4	Rotenburg towards Hamburg Hbf
Terminus	RB 41	Bremen-Oberneuland towards Hamburg Hbf
Preceding station	NordWestBahn	Following station
Bremen Neustadt towards Osnabrück Hbf	RB 58	Terminus
Preceding station	Start	Following station
Terminus	RB 37	Achim towards Uelzen
Preceding station	Bremen S-Bahn	Following station
Bremen-Walle towards Bremen-Farge	RS1	Bremen-Sebaldsbrück towards Verden (Aller)
Bremen-Burg towards Bremerhaven-Lehe	RS2	Bremen-Hemelingen towards Twistringen
Bremen Neustadt towards Bad Zwischenahn	RS3	Terminus
Delmenhorst towards Bad Zwischenahn	RS30	Terminus
Bremen Neustadt towards Nordenham	RS4	Terminus
Preceding station	EVB	Following station
Bremen-Burg towards Stade	Moor Express	Terminus
Location

Bremen Hauptbahnhof (German for Bremen main station) is a railway station in the city of Bremen in northwestern Germany. It is the most important rail station for both the city and state of Bremen; InterCityExpress, Intercity, EuroCity, CityNightLine and DB NachtZug services call at the station, which is situated to the Northeast of the city centre. The train services are operated by Deutsche Bahn, NordWestBahn, Metronom and Erixx.

== History ==
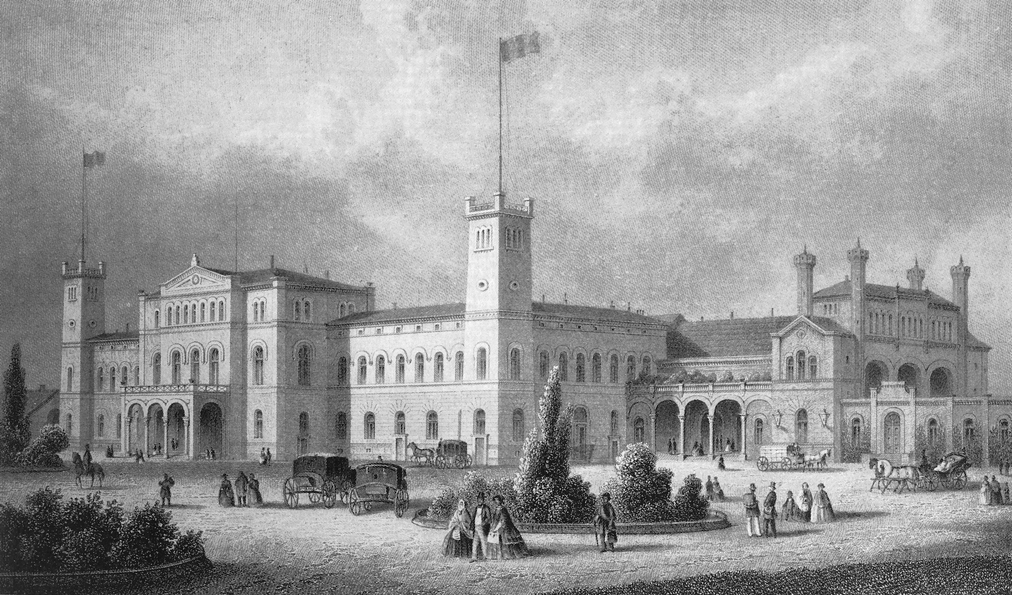
Bremen Hannover Bahnhof in 1847

Bremen's first train station was opened in 1847 on the site of today's station, on the line to Hanover. Later, lines leading to Vegesack (Bremen-Vegesack–Bremen line), Bremerhaven (then Wesermünde, Bremen–Bremerhaven line), Oldenburg and Uelzen (Uelzen–Langwedel railway) were connected to the station. In 1870, the Köln-Mindener Eisenbahn, opening its Wanne-Eickel–Hamburg line (Rollbahn), built another station some hundred metres north of the old station, since the old station could not cope with the additional Rollbahn traffic. Eventually, it was decided that a single station would be better, and so today's station was built from 1886 to 1891 after plans by Hubert Stier, with sculptures by Diedrich Samuel Kropp and Carl Dopmeyer. In 1907, additional tracks were added. Whilst the station hall has been remodeled several times due to war damage and modernisation, its basic outline still resembles the original 1880s building.

The station hall was thoroughly renovated in the late 1990s and early 2000s, merging the two formerly separated passenger tunnels into a single concourse. Since 1973, it is protected by the monument protection act. The station's platforms, however, were only partially renovated, but are expected to be refurbished from 2008 on for €12.6 million.

According to the US-based lobby organization Consumer Choice Center, the station enjoyed a great reputation throughout much of its history; however, the center's 2022 ranking of 50 railway stations placed Bremen Hauptbahnhof last.

== Rail services ==
In the 2026 timetable, the following services stop at the station:

=== Long distance ===
Line	Route	Frequency	Operator
ICE 16	Oldenburg – Bremen – Hanover – Berlin – Berlin Südkreuz	Every 4 hours	DB Fernverkehr
ICE 22	Frankfurt (Main) – Kassel-Wilhelmshöhe – Göttingen – Hannover – Bremen – Oldenburg	1 train pair	DB Fernverkehr
ICE 26	(Oldenburg –) Bremen – Hannover – Göttingen – Kassel-Wilhelmshöhe – Marburg – Frankfurt – Heidelberg – Karlsruhe	Every 4 hours	DB Fernverkehr
ICE 33	Westerland – Niebüll – Itzehoe – Hamburg – Bremen – Münster – Essen – Düsseldorf – Cologne	1 train pair	DB Fernverkehr
ICE 42	Hamburg-Altona – Hamburg – Bremen – Osnabrück – Münster (Westf) – Dortmund – Essen – Duisburg – Düsseldorf – Cologne – Frankfurt Airport – Mannheim – Stuttgart – Ulm – Augsburg – Munich	1 train pair	DB Fernverkehr
ICE 43	Hamburg-Altona – Hamburg – Bremen – Osnabrück – Münster – Dortmund – Bochum – Essen – Duisburg – Düsseldorf – Cologne – Frankfurt Airport – Mannheim – Karlsruhe – Freiburg – Basel	Every 2 hours	DB Fernverkehr
IC 56	Norddeich Mole – Emden – Leer – Oldenburg – Bremen – Hannover – Braunschweig – Magdeburg – Halle – Leipzig	Every 2 hours	DB Fernverkehr
FLX 20	Hamburg – Hamburg-Harburg – Bremen – Osnabrück – Münster (Westf) – Gelsenkirchen – Essen – Duisburg – Düsseldorf – Köln	2–3 train pairs	Flixmobility

In March 2026 GoVolta services began calling.

=== Regional services ===
- RE 1 Norddeich - Emden - Oldenburg - Bremen - Nienburg - Hanover
- RE 4 Bremen - Rotenburg - Buchholz - Hamburg
- RE 8 Bremerhaven-Lehe - Bremen - Nienburg - Hanover
- RE 9 Bremerhaven-Lehe - Bremen - Osnabrück
- RB 37 Der Heidesprinter Bremen - Soltau - Uelzen
- RB 41 Bremen - Rotenburg - Tostedt - Buchholz - Hamburg
- RB 58 Osnabrück - Bramsche - Vechta - Delmenhorst - Bremen

=== S-Bahn services ===
- RS1 Bremen-Farge - Bremen-Vegesack - Bremen - Verden
- RS2 Bremerhaven-Lehe - Osterholz-Scharmbeck - Bremen - Twistringen
- RS3 Bad Zwischenahn - Oldenburg - Delmenhorst - Bremen
- RS30 Bremen - Delmenhorst - Hude - Oldenburg - Oldenburg-Wechloy - Bad Zwischenahn
- RS4 Nordenham - Hude - Delmenhorst - Bremen

== Operational usage ==
The station sees 100 long-distance and 410 regional trains per day. About 100,000 passengers per day use the station. The station features nine platform tracks, of which seven are in the station hall. In the hall, two tracks serve as through tracks for freight traffic. The station is electrified since 1964 and has been thoroughly modernised during the late 1990s. Both the passenger and mail subways, which used to be separate, were joined together and the station's subway now features a rich selection of shops and food halls, akin to a shopping mall. The platforms have been partly modernised as well (most notably platforms 5 and 6, which carry most of the southbound long distance traffic), and lifts have been put in.
Trains usually depart from:

- Track 1 - Osnabrück (Wanne-Eickel–Hamburg line)
- Track 2 - Oldenburg (Oldenburg–Bremen line), Nordenham (Hude–Blexen line)
- Track 5 - Verden, Hanover (Bremen–Hanover line)
- Track 6 - Bremerhaven (Bremen–Bremerhaven line)
- Track 7 - Osnabrück (Intercity), Diepholz (Wanne-Eickel–Hamburg line)
- Track 8 - Hamburg (Wanne-Eickel–Hamburg line), Uelzen (Uelzen–Langwedel line)
- Track 9 - Hamburg (Metronom, Wanne-Eickel–Hamburg line)
- Track 10 - Rotenburg (Wanne-Eickel–Hamburg line)

The station is connected to the Bremen tramway network operated by BSAG by a large, six-track tram station in front of the main hall.

== Decorations ==
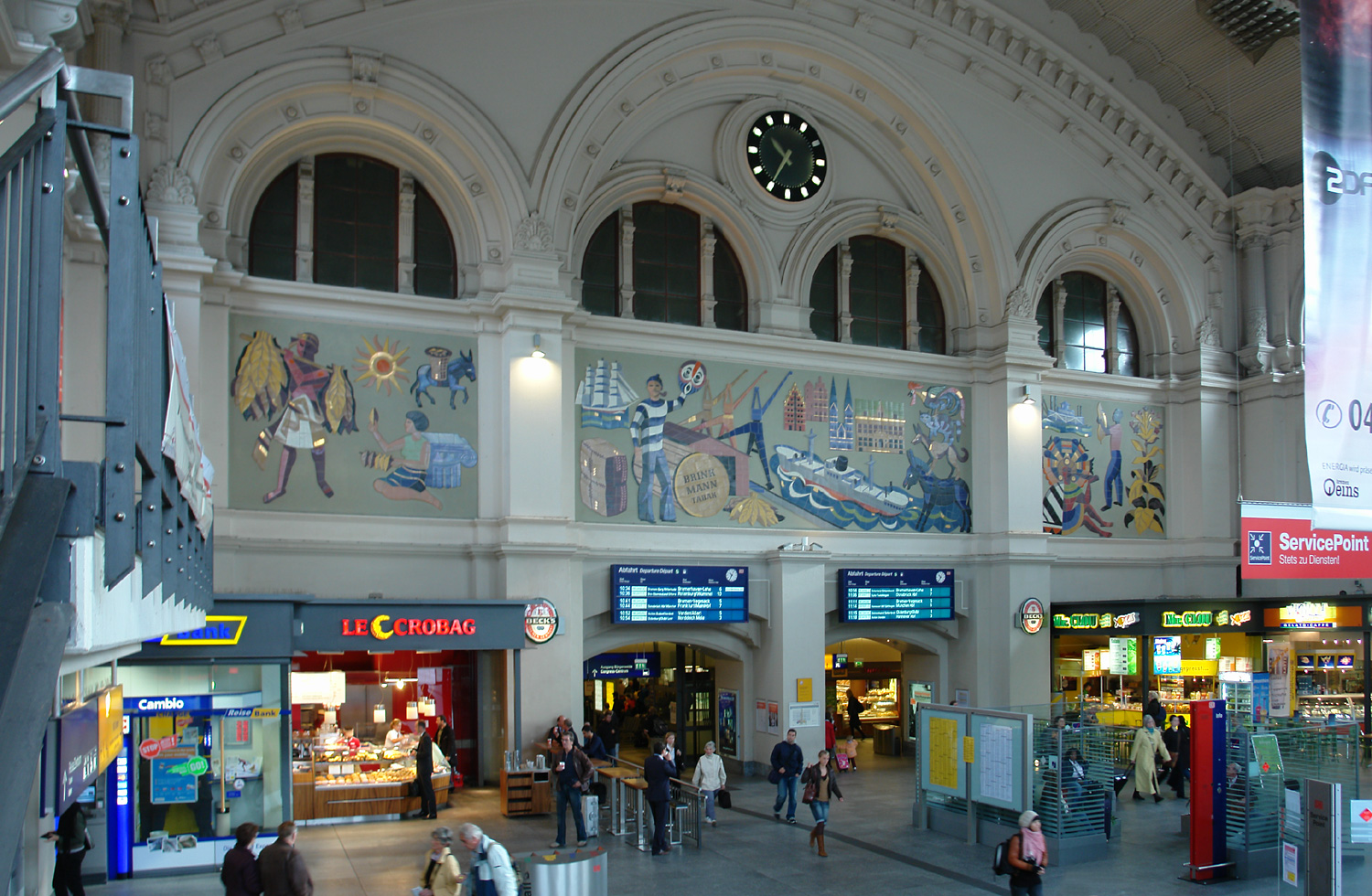
Mural inside the station hall

The sculptures on the façade, among other railway-related symbolisms, depict the coats of arms of the cities of Bremen and Hamburg, the original destinations of the line.

There is a large mural inside the station's main hall, dating back to the 1950s and showing scenes from the city port. It went into oblivion when it was drywalled off and station announcement boards were put over it in the 1970s, but has been carefully renovated at the station's most recent interior overhaul and is now viewable to the public again.

== See also ==
- List of railway stations in Bremen
- Rail transport in Germany
