= Bremen-Vegesack–Bremen railway =

Railway line in Bremen, Germany

The Bremen-Vegesack – Bremen railway line connects the northern parts of Bremen with the city centre. It was opened in 1862, is 17 km (11 mi) long and fully electrified with two tracks. The line shares its tracks with the Bremen–Bremerhaven railway line between Bremen-Burg and Bremen Hauptbahnhof.

The line mostly carries commuter trains; RegionalBahn double-deck trains in push-pull operation with Class 111 engines run in 30-minute intervals on the line. Some trains continue past Bremen Hauptbahnhof toward Verden.

To improve operational quality, a new block signal and track switching are planned to be installed by 2025.

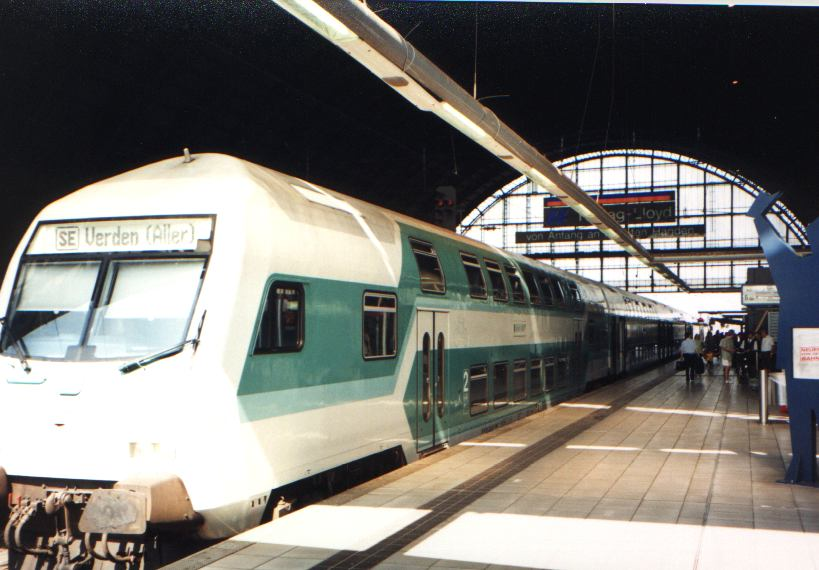
Train on the line as seen in 1999, Bremen Hbf
