= Twistringen station =

Railway station in Twistringen, Germany

Twistringen
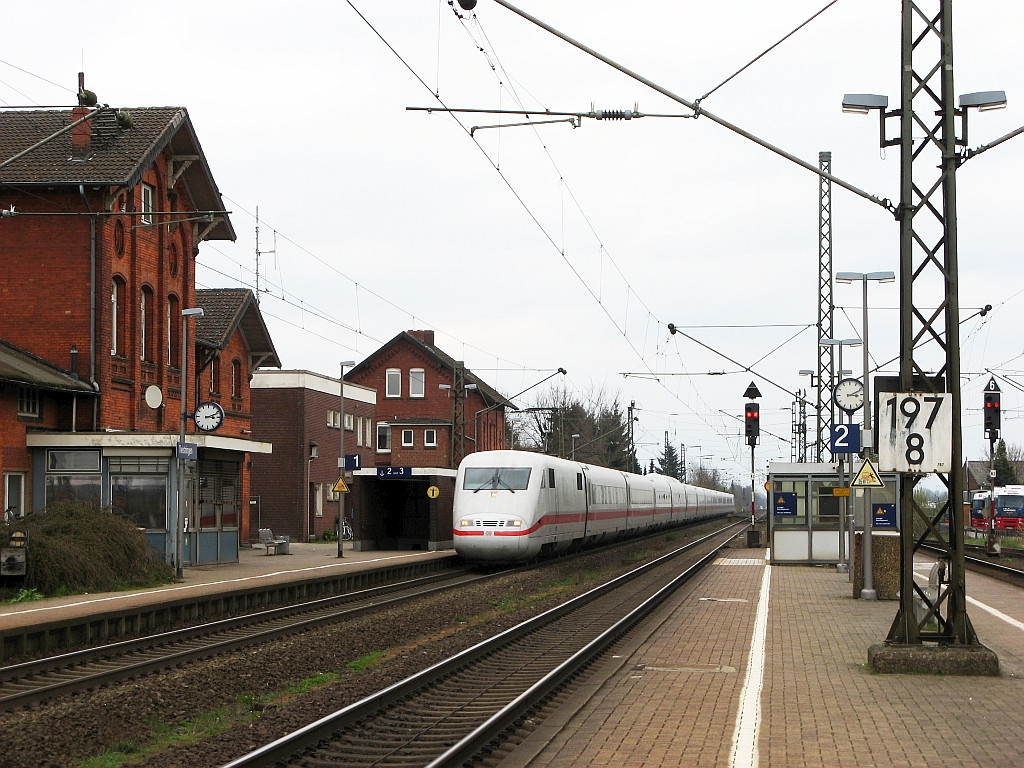
- Twistringen railway station

General information
- Location: Twistringen, Lower Saxony; Germany
- Coordinates: 52.7917°N 8.6442°E
- Line: Wanne-Eickel–Hamburg railway
- Platforms: 3

Other information
- Fare zone: VBN: 540

Services
Preceding station	DB Regio Nord	Following station
Bassum towards Bremerhaven-Lehe	RE 9	Barnstorf towards Osnabrück Hbf
Preceding station	Bremen S-Bahn	Following station
Bassum towards Bremerhaven-Lehe	RS2	Terminus
Location

Twistringen (German: Bahnhof Twistringen) is a railway station located in Twistringen, Germany. The station is located on the Wanne-Eickel–Hamburg railway. The train services are operated by Deutsche Bahn and NordWestBahn. The station has been part of the Bremen S-Bahn since December 2010.

== Train services ==
The following services currently call at the station:

- Regional services RE 9 Bremerhaven-Lehe - Bremen - Osnabrück
- Bremen S-Bahn services RS2 Bremerhaven-Lehe - Osterholz-Scharmbeck - Bremen - Twistringen
