= Verden (Aller) station =

Railway station in Verden an der Aller, Germany

Verden (Aller)
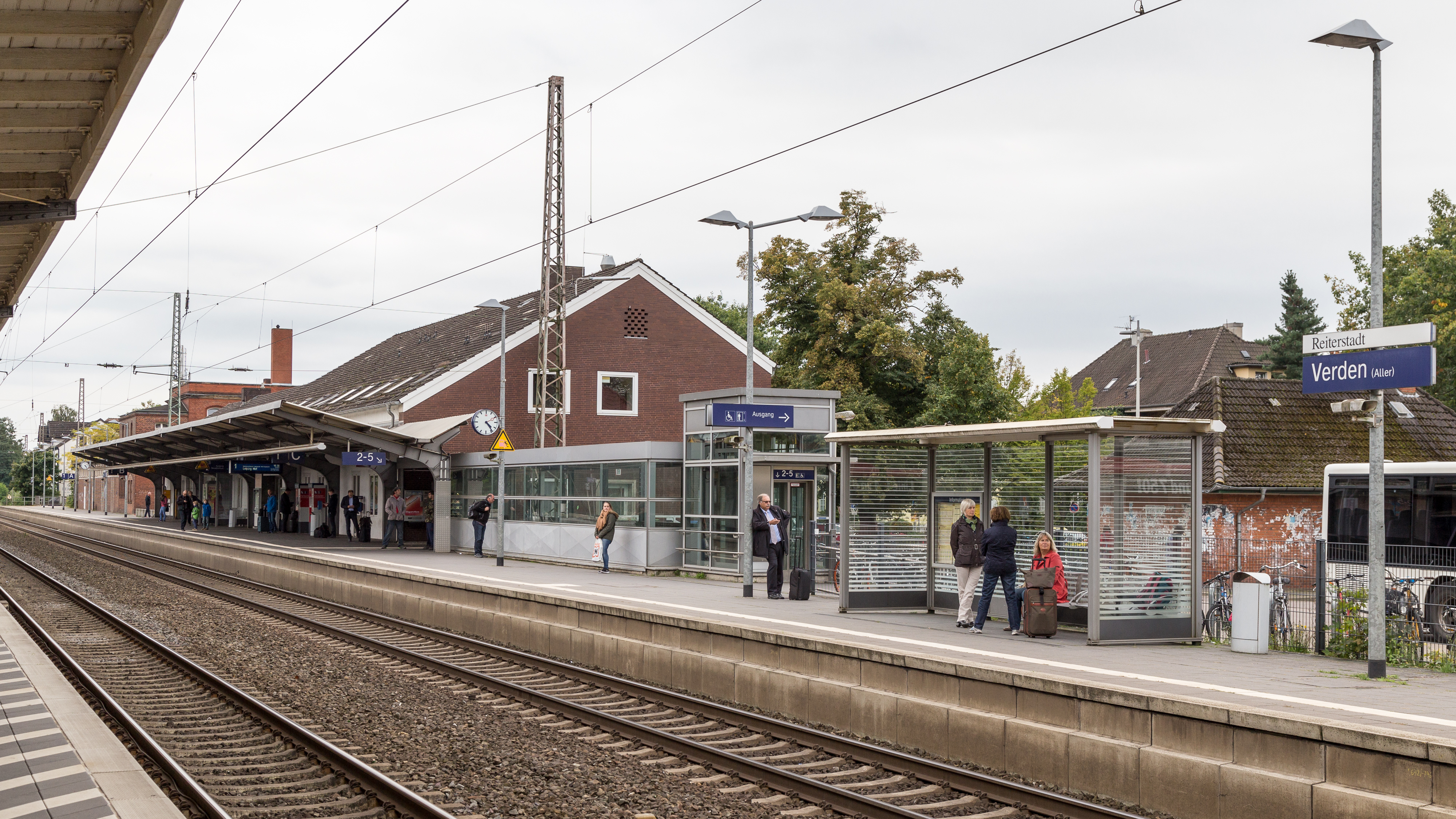
- Verden (Aller) railway station

General information
- Location: Verden an der Aller, Lower Saxony; Germany
- Coordinates: 52.5515°N 9.1420°E
- Lines: Bremen–Hanover railway Rotenburg-Verden railway
- Platforms: 5

Other information
- Station code: 6408
- Category: 3
- Fare zone: VBN: 130
- Website: www.bahnhof.de

Services
Preceding station	DB Fernverkehr	Following station
Bremen Hbf towards Oldenburg Hbf	ICE 10	Nienburg (Weser) towards Berlin Ostbahnhof
Bremen Hbf towards Norddeich Mole	IC 56	Nienburg towards Leipzig Hbf
Preceding station	DB Regio Nord	Following station
Achim towards Norddeich Mole	RE 1	Dörverden towards Hannover Hbf
Achim towards Bremerhaven-Lehe	RE 8	Dörverden towards Hannover Hbf
Preceding station	Bremen S-Bahn	Following station
Langwedel towards Bremen-Farge	RS1	Terminus
Terminus	RS6	Rotenburg Terminus
Location
- Location within Lower Saxony Location within Germany Location within Europe

Verden (Aller) or Verden an der Aller (German: Bahnhof Verden (Aller)) is a railway station located in Verden an der Aller, Germany. The station was opened in 1847 and is located on the Bremen–Hanover railway and Rotenburg-Verden railway. The train services are operated by Deutsche Bahn and NordWestBahn. The station has been part of the Bremen S-Bahn since December 2010.

== Train services ==
The following services currently call at the station:

- Intercity services IC 56 Norddeich - Emden - Oldenburg - Bremen - Hanover - Braunschweig - Magdeburg - Leipzig / Berlin - Cottbus
- Regional services RE 1 Norddeich - Emden - Oldenburg - Bremen - Nienburg - Hanover
- Regional services RE 8 Bremerhaven-Lehe - Bremen - Nienburg - Hanover
- Bremen S-Bahn RS1 Bremen-Farge - Bremen-Vegesack - Bremen - Verden
- Bremen S-Bahn RS6 Verden - Rotenburg

== Bus services ==
The station is served by the following bus services:

- 108 Verden - Hilgermissen - Hoya
- 701 Verden - Armsen - Stemmen - Kirchlinteln
- 711 Verden - Dauelsen
- 712 Verden Town Service
- 713 Verden - Luttum - Kirchlinteln
- 714 Verden Town Service
- 715 Verden - Eitzel - Kirchlinteln - Bendingborstel
- 717 Verden - Hutbergen
- 718 Verden Town Service
- 720 Verden - Blender - Thedinghausen - Bruchhausen - Vilsen
- 725 Rotenburg - Hellwege - Verden
- 735 Verden - Dörverden - Hassel—Hoya-Eystrup
- 740 Bremen - Achim - Langwedel - Verden
- 760 Fischerhude - Ottersberg - Verden
- 765 Verden - Dörverden - Rethem
