= Bremen Regional S-Bahn =

S-Bahn network in Germany

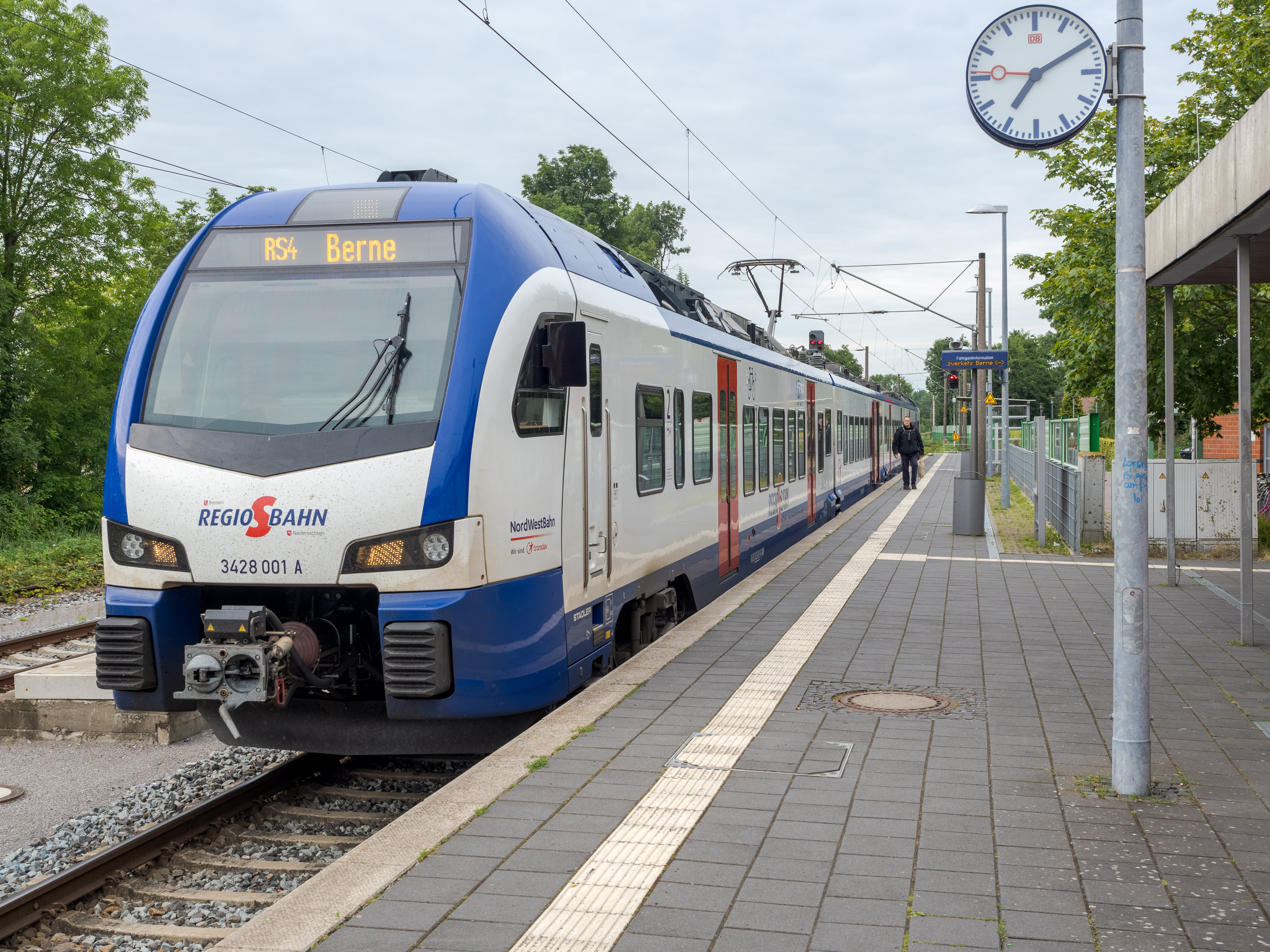
- Stadler Flirt 3XL

Overview
- Locale: Free Hanseatic City of Bremen, Lower Saxony
- Transit type: S-Bahn
- Number of lines: 6
- Number of stations: 64
- Website: www.nordwestbahn.de/de/regio-s-bahn

Operation
- Began operation: 2010
- Operator: NordWestBahn

Technical
- System length: 270 km (168 mi)
- Track gauge: 1,435 mm (4 ft 8 1/2 in) (standard gauge)
System map

The Bremen S-Bahn (German: Regio-S-Bahn Bremen/Niedersachsen) is an S-Bahn network in Germany, covering the Bremen/Oldenburg Metropolitan Region, from Bremerhaven in the north to Twistringen in the south and Bad Zwischenahn and Oldenburg in the west. It has been in operation since 2010. This network unified existing regional transport in Bremen as well as surrounding cities, including Bremerhaven, Delmenhorst, Twistringen, Nordenham, Oldenburg, and Verden an der Aller. The network lies completely within the area of the Verkehrsverbund Bremen/Niedersachsen (VBN; Bremen/Lower Saxony Transport Association), whose tariff structure applies.

== Lines ==
Since December 2022, the network of the NordWestBahn around Bremen consists of six lines. Two of the lines are cross-city routes; three others are radial lines that begin and end at the Bremen Hauptbahnhof and the sixth is a tangential line that does not connect directly to Bremen.

Line	Route	Frequency		Notes	Length
Line	Route	Peak	Off-peak	Notes	Length
RS1	Bremen-Farge–Bremen-Vegesack	30'	30'	Trial runs in 2007; part of RS 1 since December 2011	10,4 km
RS1	Bremen-Vegesack–Bremen Hbf	15'	30'	Opened December 2011	17,2 km
RS1	Bremen Hbf–Verden	30'	60'	Opened December 2011	35,7 km
RS2	Bremerhaven-Lehe–Bremerhaven Hbf–Bremen Hbf–Twistringen	60'	60'	Additional rush-hour trains	107,4 km
RS3	Bremen Hbf–Oldenburg Hauptbahnhof–(Bad Zwischenahn)	60'	60'	Bad Zwischenahn is served only during off-peak hours and is otherwise covered by the RS 30 line.	56 km
RS30	Bremen Hbf – Hude – Oldenburg (Oldb) – Bad Zwischenahn	60'	-	Daily from morning to evening; starts later on weekends than during the week	
RS4	Bremen Hbf–Nordenham	60'	60'		71,3 km
RS6	Verden (Aller) – Rotenburg (Wümme)	60'	120'	Replaced the RB 76 service on 11 December 2022	27.1 km

=== RS 1 ===
The cross-city RS 1 line forms the backbone of Bremen's S-Bahn network. Running parallel to the Weser River, it connects the entire urban area of Bremen with the southeastern suburban axis in Verden County. This pivotal line began operations in December 2011, following the activation of passenger services on the Bremen-Farge–Bremen-Vegesack railway by NordWestBahn in 2007. The line was fully electrified in summer 2011, enabling more efficient operations with modern electric multiple units (EMUs) from December that year.

On weekdays, a quarter-hourly service operates between Bremen-Vegesack and Bremen Hauptbahnhof. Sections north to Farge and south to Verden maintain half-hourly and hourly services respectively, with increased frequency during peak hours. The rolling stock includes 3- and 5-car Coradia Continental units, occasionally coupled to form double sets during peak times.

Service intervals were further optimized with the addition of a 15-minute Saturday midday frequency and the introduction of hourly nighttime services on weekends starting in December 2017.

=== RS 2 ===
The RS 2 line, operational since December 2010, provides a vital north-south corridor connecting Bremerhaven-Lehe with Twistringen. Merging the former R2 and R5 lines, it creates seamless access across the region with stops at major hubs such as Bremerhaven Hauptbahnhof and Bremen Hauptbahnhof.

The RS 2 primarily operates on an hourly frequency, with supplementary half-hourly services during peak hours between Bremen and Bremerhaven. Future developments include a new interchange at Bremen-Föhrenstraße to streamline connections with the RS 1 and Bremen's tram network. The schedule calls for preparatory construction measures to begin in 2026. In 2028, the main work is planned, so that operations can begin in 2029.

=== RS 3/RS 30 ===
Replacing the regional rail service between Bremen and Oldenburg, the RS 3 line extends to Bad Zwischenahn, integrating key stops such as Delmenhorst, Oldenburg, and Hude. Introduced in 2010, the service has evolved with the addition of rapid connections to Wilhelmshaven via Oldenburg.

With reduced intermediate stops, travel times between Bremen and Oldenburg have been optimized. Since 2022, the newly introduced RS 30 line complements the RS 3, offering faster connections and providing expanded capacity along this heavily trafficked corridor.

=== RS 4 ===
The RS 4 line ensures robust connectivity between Nordenham and Bremen Hauptbahnhof, serving key towns along the Unterweser. Since its inception in 2010, the line has operated with hourly frequencies, bolstered by modernized stops like Kirchhammelwarden, reopened in 2014.

=== RS 6 ===
The RS 6 line links Rotenburg (Wümme) with Verden (Aller). While bypassing Bremen, it is an integral part of the network, providing essential connections for commuters and rural areas. Operating on a bi-hourly schedule, peak hours feature an hourly service using modern electric trains.

== History ==
In the 1970s, the state Free Hanseatic City of Bremen first planned both regional train and underground systems. The S-Bahn was intended to connect the city with surrounding municipalities. It wasn't meant to completely operate underground, but rather as an independent rail system that would also connect different city neighborhoods. An underground line was to run from Delmenhorst through Huchting, Bremen Airport, the city center, University of Bremen, and Borgfeld and end in Lilienthal.

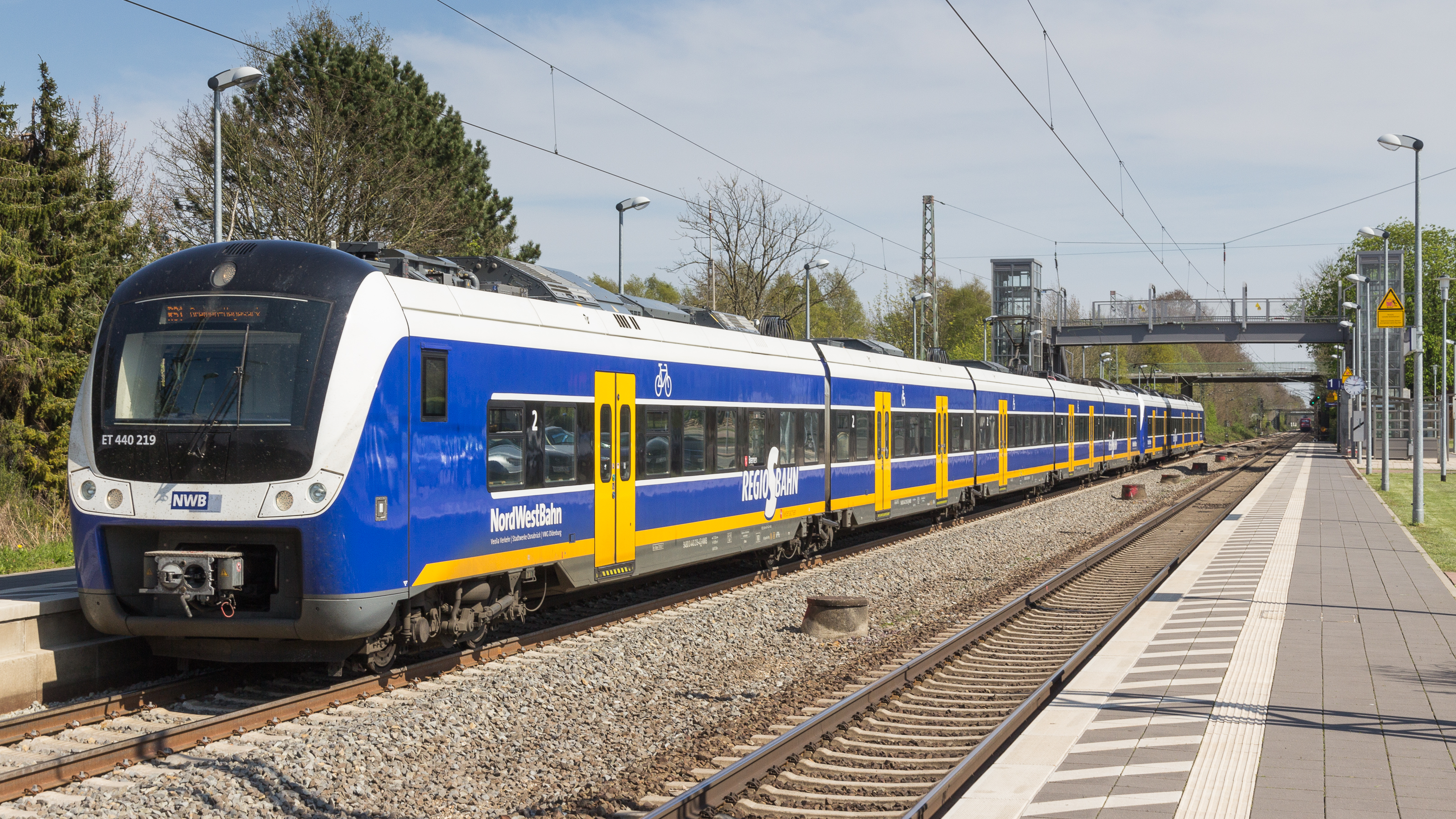
RS1 in old colours in Baden

Line S 1 was to run from Schwanewede through the city center, Sebaldsbrück, Mahndorf, and Achim and end in Verden. Line S 2 was to run from Osterholz-Scharmbeck through Ritterhude, Marßel, Burglesum, Findorff, University of Bremen, Oberneuland, and Rotenburg. The third line was planned to go through Delmenhorst, Huchting, Neustadt, city center, Hemelingen, Kirchweyhe, Syke, and Twistringen. A temporary panel of the Bürgerschaft, which gathered the findings after 19 months of planning, pedestrian zones, closely spaced stops, and park and ride lots at the termini of the lines were planned as well. Due to financial and technical difficulties and political opposition, these plans were not realized.

== Rolling stock ==
A fleet of 35 Alstom Coradia Continental EMUs operate on the network since December 2010. Additionally, 16 Stadler Flirt EMUs were ordered in 2019, with service entry scheduled for December 2022. For the new transport contract starting in December 2022, the Coradia Continental trains are being modernized at the Talbot plant in Aachen. The prototype was presented at the end of July 2021. Externally, the train sets will be painted in Transdev colors: a white car body, blue roof and underframe, and red doors. Inside, the trains will receive new seat cushions and covers, new armrests and tables, as well as new LED lighting. Additionally, they will be equipped with Wi-Fi, power outlets, and a new passenger information system.

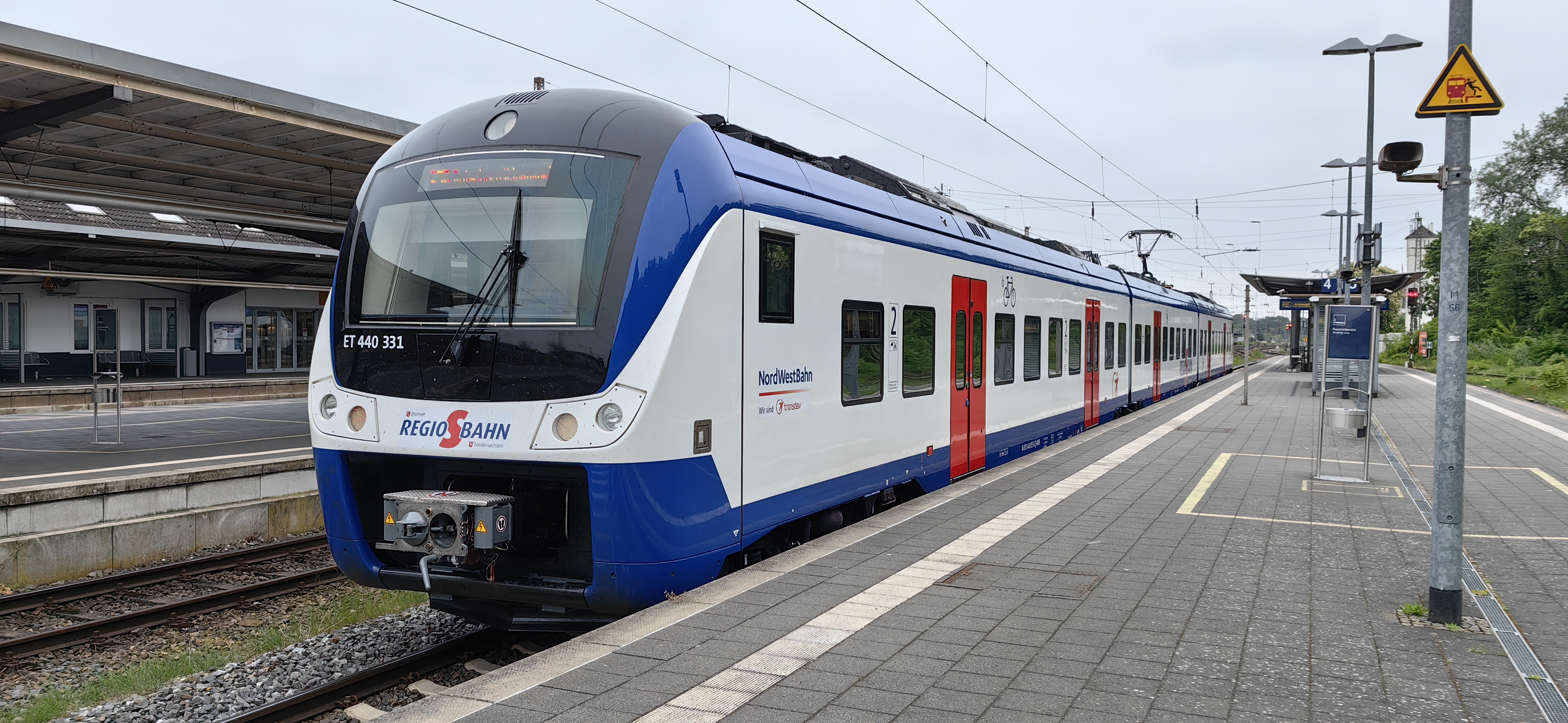
Alstom Coradia Continental

== See also ==
- Rail transport in Germany
