= List of railway stations in Lower Saxony =

The current ranking of railway stations operated by the Deutsche Bahn in Lower Saxony, Germany, is given in the table below. Note that Hbf is the abbreviation for Hauptbahnhof (main or central station).

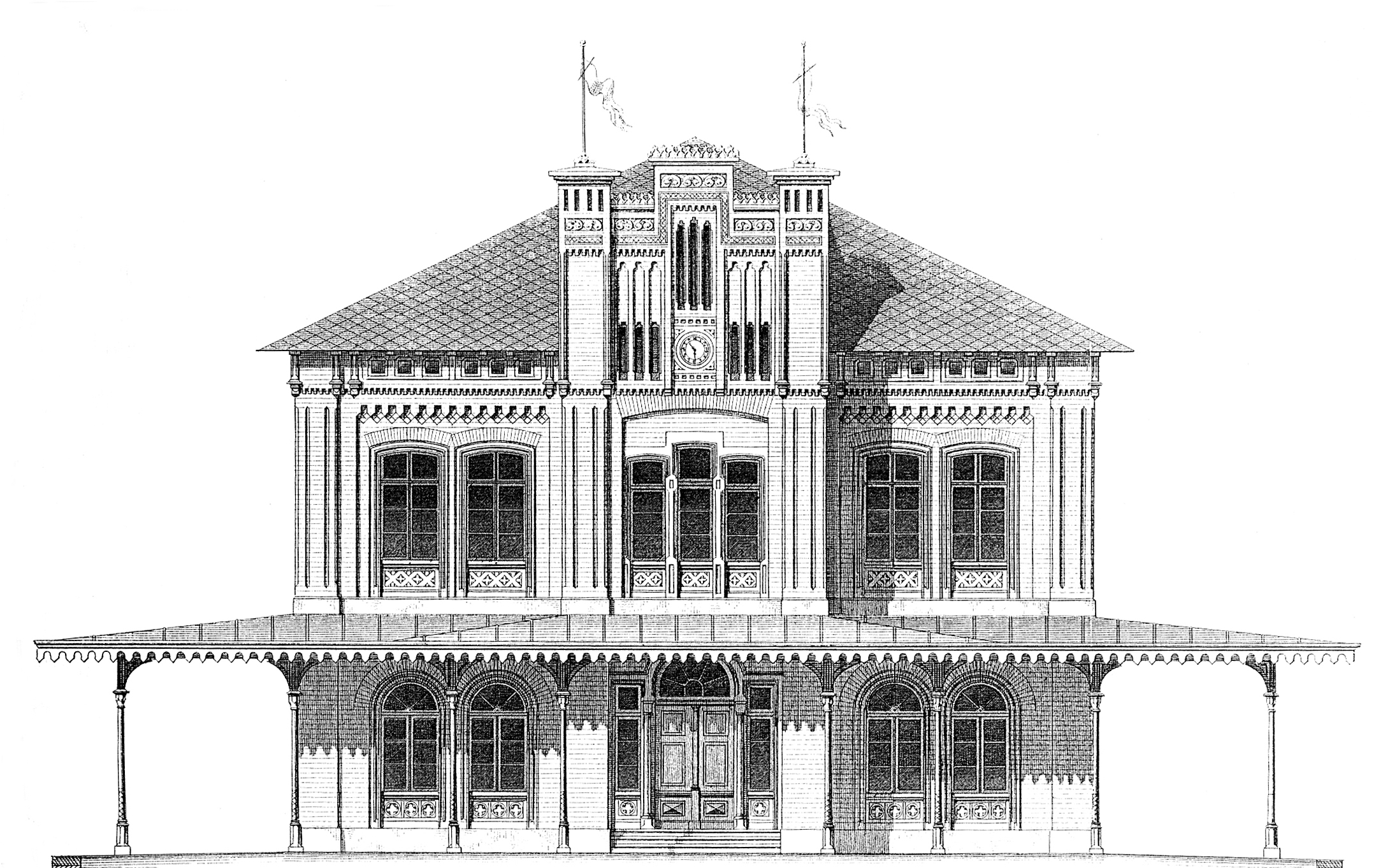
Nordstemmen: The southern station building built for the king, works drawing by Conrad Wilhelm Hase, 1853

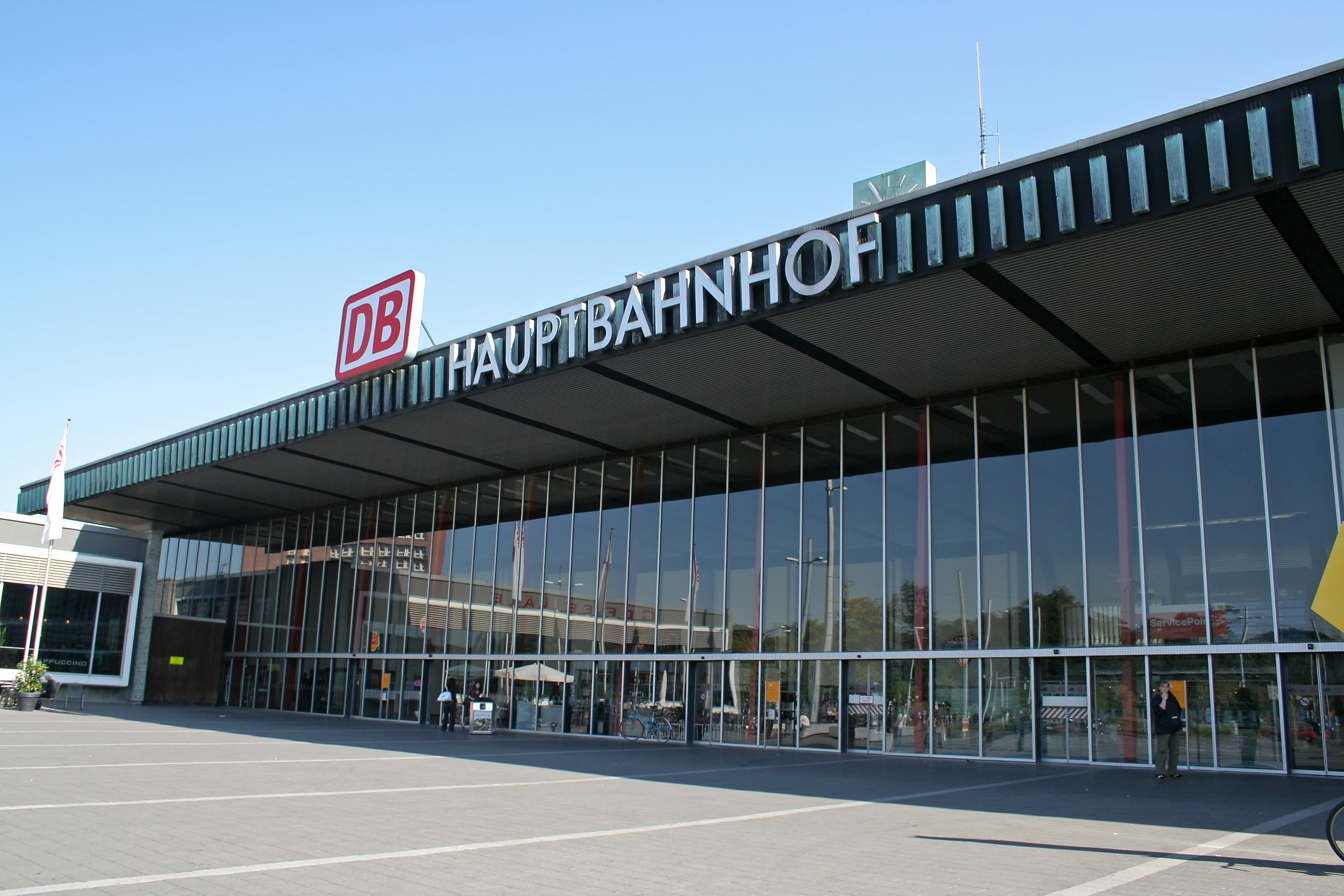
Braunschweig Hauptbahnhof station hall in 1960

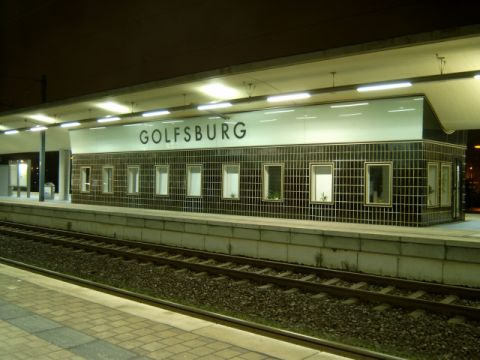
Wolfsburg railway station during the “Golfsburg-Aktion“ (photographed: September 2003)

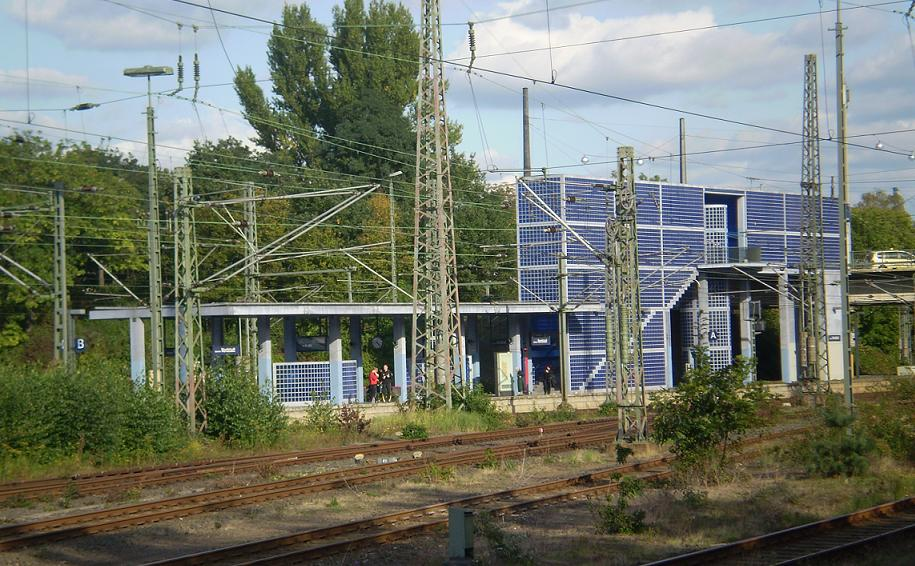
Hannover-Nordstadt railway station S-Bahn station

Station No.	Location	2014 category
0007	Achim	4
0008	Achmer	6
0011	Adelebsen	6
0020	Agathenburg	6
0025	Ahlten	5
0054	Alfeld (Leine)	4
0057	Aligse	5
	Apensen	
0193	Aschendorf	6
0225	Augustfehn	5
0248	Bad Bentheim	4
0253	Bad Bevensen	5
0281	Bad Harzburg	3
0306	Bad Münder (Deister)	5
0311	Bad Nenndorf	5
0319	Bad Pyrmont	5
0368	Bad Zwischenahn	5
0370	Baden (nr Verden)	5
0400	Bantorf	5
	Bargstedt	
0414	Barnstorf	5
0418	Barsinghausen	5
0425	Bassum	5
0482	Bennemühlen	5
0483	Bennigsen	5
577	Berne	6
0676	Bissendorf	5
0738	Bodenfelde	6
0753	Bohmte	5
0773	Bookholzberg	6
0815	Brake (Unterweser)	6
0818	Bramsche	5
819	Bramstedt bei Syke	6
0835	Braunschweig Hbf	2
	Bremervörde	
0880	Brest-Aspe	7
0880	Brettorf	7
0903	Bruchmühlen	6
0941	Buchholz (Nordheide)	3
0948	Bückeburg	4
1015	Buxtehude	3
1022	Calberlah	6
1036	Celle	3
1058	Cloppenburg	6
1095	Cuxhaven	4
1121	Dannenberg Ost	7
1254	Dollbergen	6
1145	Dedensen/Gümmer	4
1159	Delmenhorst	3
1200	Diepholz	4
1227	Dissen-Bad Rothenfelde	6
1254	Dollbergen	5
1256	Dollern	6
1281	Dörpen	6
7626	Dörverden	6
1473	Egestorf (Deister)	5
1485	Ehlershausen	5
1518	Eilvese	6
1520	Einbeck-Salzderhelden	4
1544	Eldagsen-Völksen	5
1561	Elsfleth	6
1577	Elze (Han)	5
1580	Emden Hbf	3
1586	Emmerke	6
1589	Empelde	5
1721	Etelsen	4
1743	Eystrup	5
1759	Fallersleben	5
2005	Ganderkesee	6
2028	Geeste	6
2122	Gifhorn	4
2164	Göhrde	7
2153	Goldenstedt	7
2202	Goslar	4
2218	Göttingen	2
2356	Hagen (Han)	6
2524	Hämelerwald	5
2525	Hamelin	3
2543	Hann Münden	6
2544	Hannover Bismarckstrasse	4
7180	Hannover Flughafen	4
2545	Hannover Hbf	1
7181	Hannover-Karl-Wiechert-Allee	4
3488	Hannover Messe/Laatzen	4
0145	Hannover-Anderten/Misburg	5
2546	Hannover-Bornum	5
2549	Hannover-Kleefeld	5
7183	Hannover-Ledeburg	4
2550	Hannover-Leinhausen	5
2551	Hannover-Linden/Fischerhof	4
7899	Hannover-Nordstadt	4
6424	Hannover-Vinnhorst	4
2557	Hardegsen	6
2559	Haren (Ems)	6
	Harsefeld	
2576	Hasbergen	6
2587	Haste (Han)	4
2645	Heidkrug	6
2677	Heinschenwalde	
2677	Helmstedt	4
	Hesedorf	
2746	Hesepe	7
2740	Herzberg (Harz)	5
2765	Hildesheim Hbf	2
2766	Hildesheim Ost	6
	Hilter	
2795	Hittfeld	6
2870	Holdorf	6
2876	Holtensen (b Weetzen)	5
2915	Horneburg	5
2933	Hoykenkamp	6
2938	Hude	4
2985	Immensen/Arpke	6
3184	Kirchdorf (Deister)	6
3199	Kirchhorsten	6
3205	Kirchweyhe	5
3248	Kleinensiel	6
	Kloster Oesede	
3354	Königslutter	4
3407	Kreiensen	4
	Kutenholz	
3523	Langelsheim	6
7179	Langenhagen Mitte	3
3539	Langenhagen Pferdemarkt	4
3093	Langenhagen-Kaltenweide	5
3565	Langwedel	4
3568	Lathen	6
3582	Lauenförde-Beverungen	6
3609	Leer (Ostfriesl)	3
3620	Lehrte	3
3622	Leiferde bei Gifhorn	6
3655	Lemförde	5
3657	Lemmie	5
8085	Lenglern	7
3669	Leschede	6
3674	Letter	5
3736	Lindhorst	6
3741	Lingen (Ems)	4
3743	Linsburg	6
3760	Lödingsen	7
3767	Lohne (Oldb)	6
3799	Loxstedt	6
3806	Lübberstedt	6
3858	Lunestedt	6
3855	Lüneburg	2
8024	Lutten	7
3953	Marienhafe	6
3996	Maschen	5
4014	Meckelfeld	5
4031	Meinersen	6
4044	Melle	4
4046	Mellendorf	5
4061	Meppen	5
4203	Mühlen	7
4229	Münchehof (Harz)	6
4305	Natrup-Hagen	6
4359	Neu Wulmstorf	6
4383	Neuenkirchen (Oldb)	6
4411	Neukloster	6
4455	Neustadt am Rübenberge	4
4548	Nienburg (Weser)	3
4569	Norddeich	5
4570	Norddeich Mole	4
4571	Norden	5
4573	Nordenham	6
4581	Nordstemmen	5
4586	Nörten-Hardenberg	5
4587	Northeim (Han)	3
	Oerel	
	Oesede	
4746	Offensen	7
4765	Oldenburg (Oldb) Hbf	2
4766	Oldenbüttel	6
4786	Osnabrück Altstadt	4
4787	Osnabrück Hbf	2
	Osnabrück-Sutthausen	
4795	Osterholz-Scharmbeck	5
4830	Ottersberg (Han)	6
4838	Otze	6
4857	Papenburg (Ems)	4
4885	Peine	5
4979	Poggenhagen	7
5126	Rastede	5
5156	Rechterfeld	7
5279	Rieste	7
5289	Rinteln	6
5293	Ritterhude	6
5306	Rodenkirchen (Oldb)	6
5337	Ronnenberg (Han)	5
5380	Rotenburg (Wümme)	4
	Ruschwedel	
5476	Salzbergen	5
5478	Salzgitter-Bad	6
5481	Salzgitter-Ringelheim	5
5495	Sande	5
5510	Sarstedt	5
5540	Schandelah	6
5565	Schierbrok	6
5693	Schüttorf	6
5795	Seelze	4
5797	Seesen	5
	Sellstedt	
5892	Soltau (Han)	5
5933	Springe	4
5950	Stade	4
5954	Stadthagen	4
5995	Steinfeld	7
6008	Stelle	5
6067	Stubben	6
6128	Syke	4
6231	Tostedt	4
6295	Twistringen	4
6310	Uelzen	2
6380	Uslar	6
6359	Unterlüss	5
6393	Varel (Oldb)	5
6408	Verden (Aller)	3
6397	Vechelde	5
6398	Vechta	6
6408	Verden (Aller)	3
6412	Vienenburg	5
6426	Visselhövede	6
6440	Vöhrum	6
6450	Volpriehausen	7
6520	Walsrode	6
6574	Weddel (Braunschw)	6
6576	Weener	7
6578	Weetzen	4
	Wehdel	
	Wellendorf	
6674	Wennigsen (Deister)	5
4719	Westerstede-Ocholt	5
6713	Westerhausen	6
6766	Wildeshausen	6
6772	Wilhelmshaven	4
6803	Winninghausen	6
6805	Winsen (Luhe)	4
6820	Wissingen	6
6850	Wolfenbüttel	6
6859	Wolfsburg Hbf	2
6895	Wremen	6
6913	Wunstorf	3
7884	Wüsting	6

All other stations belong to the lowest categories, classes 6 and 7.

== See also ==
- Krzewina Zgorzelecka railway station
- German railway station categories
- Railway station types of Germany
- List of scheduled railway routes in Germany
