= Kutenholz station =

Railway station in Kutenholz, Germany

Coordinates: 53.4705°N 9.3092°E

Kutenholz

General information
- Location: Kutenholz, Fredenbeck, Lower Saxony; Germany
- System: Bf
- Platforms: 1
- Tracks: 1

Other information
- Station code: n/a
- DS100 code: AKTH
- Fare zone: HVV: E/819

Services
Preceding station	EVB	Following station
Hesedorf towards Cuxhaven	RB 33	Brest-Aspe towards Buxtehude
Location

Kutenholz is a railway station in northwestern Germany. It is owned and operated by EVB, with regular trains on the line between Bremerhaven and Buxtehude.
