= Geestenseth station =

Railway station in Geestenseth, Germany

Coordinates: 53.507058°N 8.856107°E

Geestenseth
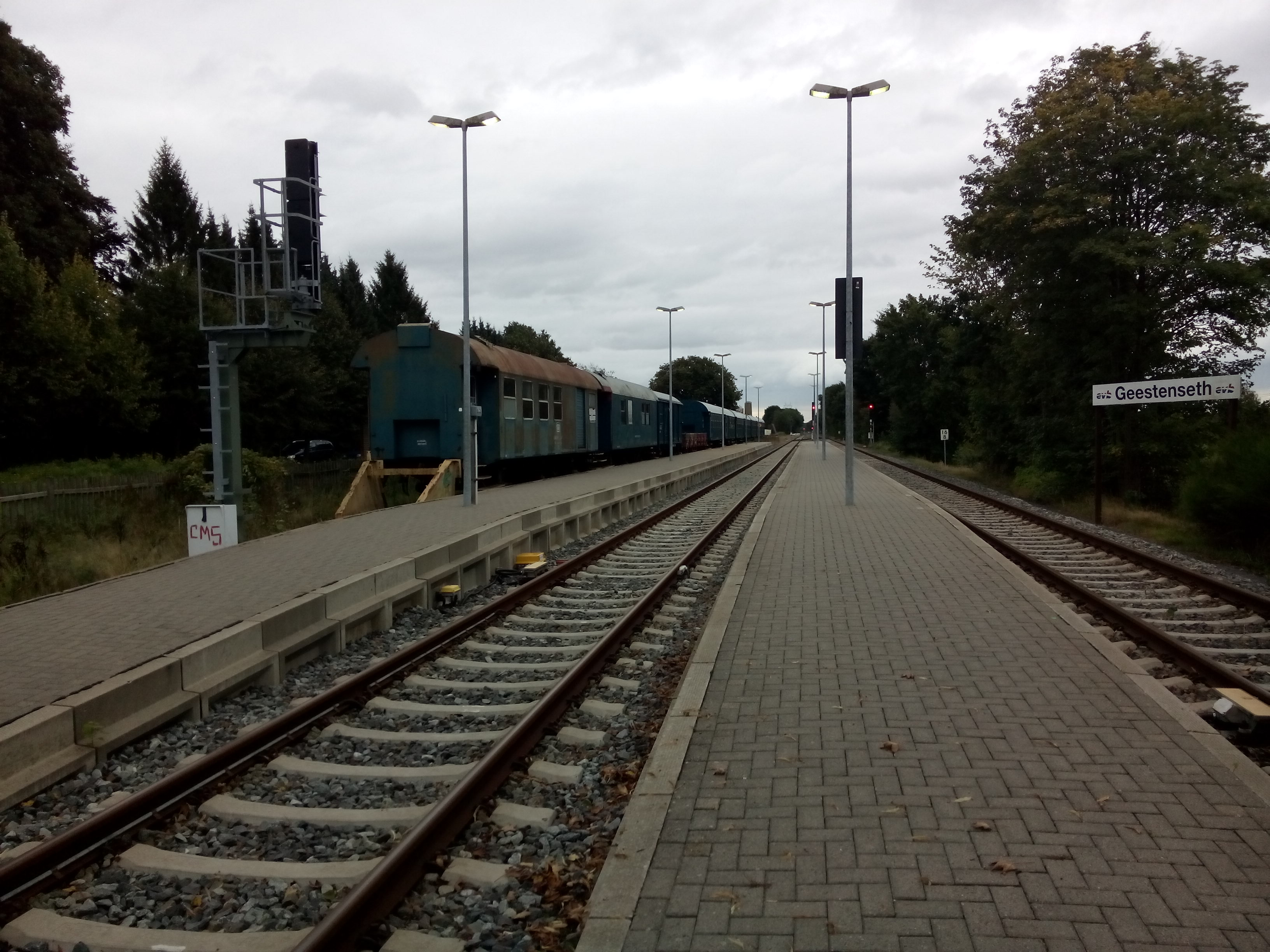

General information
- Location: Geestenseth, Schiffdorf, Lower Saxony; Germany
- System: Bf

Other information
- Station code: n/a
- DS100 code: AGTH
- Fare zone: VBN: 230 and 265; HVV: H/1259 (VBN transitional tariff, season tickets only)

History
- Opened: 1898

Services
Preceding station	EVB	Following station
Wehdel towards Cuxhaven	RB 33	Frelsdorf towards Buxtehude
Location

Geestenseth is a railway station in northwestern Germany. It is owned and operated by EVB, with regular trains on the line between Bremerhaven and Buxtehude.
