= Sellstedt station =

Railway station in Germany

Coordinates: 53.515524°N 8.722522°E

Sellstedt

General information
- Location: Sellstedt, Schiffdorf, Lower Saxony; Germany
- System: Bf
- Platforms: 1
- Tracks: 1

Other information
- Station code: n/a
- DS100 code: ASLL
- Fare zone: VBN: 260 and 265; HVV: H/1259 (VBN transitional tariff, season tickets only)

Services
Preceding station	EVB	Following station
Bremerhaven-Wulsdorf towards Cuxhaven	RB 33	Wehdel towards Buxtehude
Location

Sellstedt is a railway station in northwestern Germany. It is owned and operated by EVB, with regular trains on the line between Bremerhaven and Buxtehude.

Built in 1899, it transformed the village from a population of around 400 based around the center town village to a more spread out version on country roads towards the railway station for easy commuter access.

== Operations and services ==
The station is owned and operated by Eisenbahnen und Verkehrsbetriebe Elbe-Weser (EVB). It features a single platform and track configuration. (This core fact appears to trace to Wikimedia data, but is corroborated by secondary sources.)

Train services on the RB33 route call at Sellstedt, providing regional connections between Bremerhaven and Buxtehude. Several bus lines—including EV, 568, 578, and 569—serve the station, facilitating multimodal transport for passengers.

== Connectivity ==
According to regional transit data, the RB33 line stops at Sellstedt and provides access to major destinations such as Bremerhaven and Buxtehude. Nearby bus connections ensure that passengers can reach surrounding areas efficiently.

== Adjacent stations ==
Sellstedt is one of the stops on the EVB's RB33 line, with adjacent stations including Wehdel to one direction and Bremenhaven-Wulsdorf and Bremerhaven in the other.
