= Bremerhaven-Wulsdorf station =

Railway station in Wulsdorf, Germany

Coordinates: 53.50854°N 8.612131°E

Bremerhaven Wulsdorf
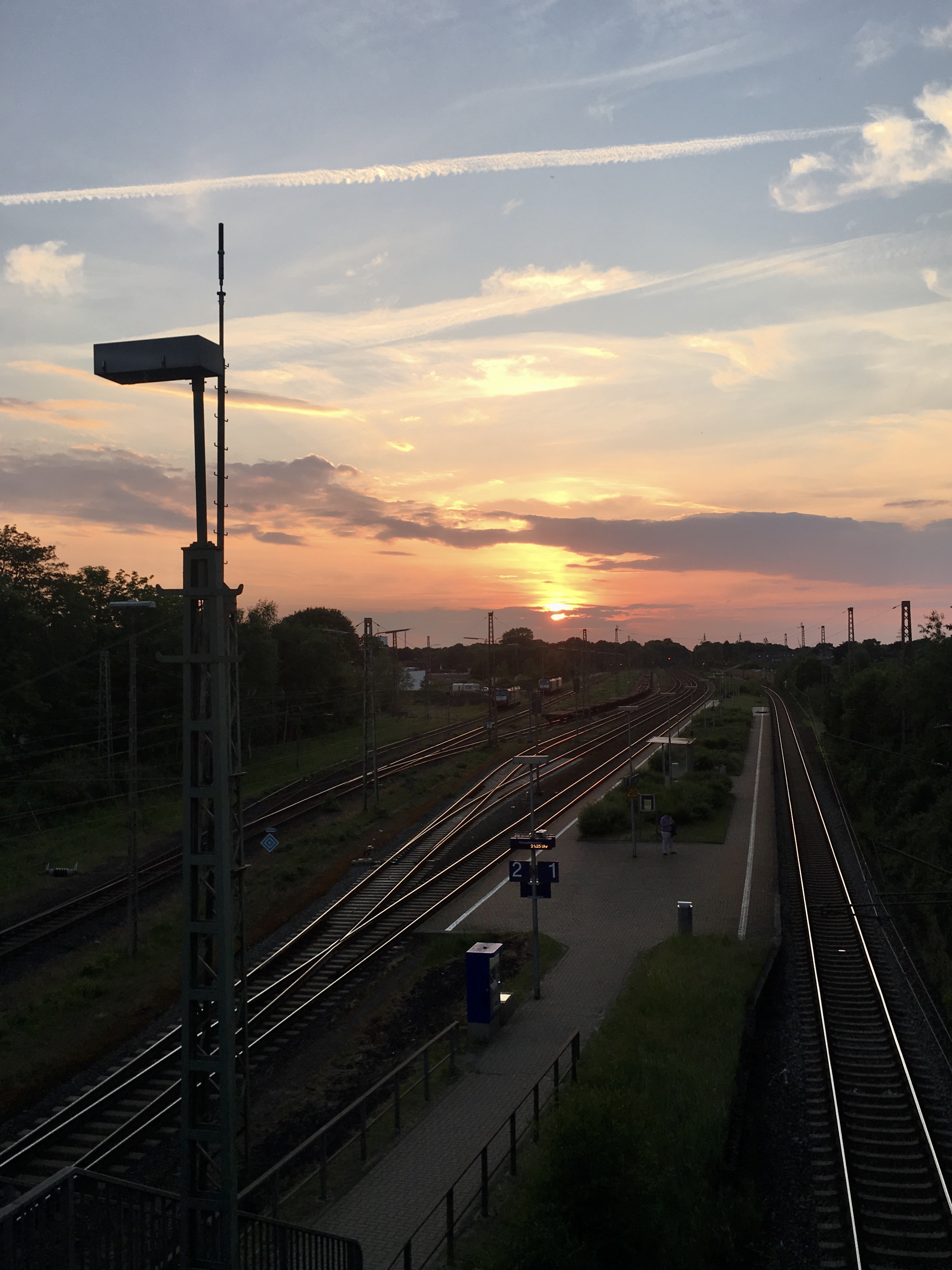

General information
- Location: Wulsdorf, Bremerhaven, Bremen; Germany
- Platforms: 2

Other information
- Station code: n/a
- DS100 code: HBWU
- Fare zone: VBN: 250

History
- Opened: 1862

Services
Preceding station	EVB	Following station
Bremerhaven Hbf towards Cuxhaven	RB 33	Sellstedt towards Buxtehude
Preceding station	Bremen S-Bahn	Following station
Bremerhaven Hbf towards Bremerhaven-Lehe	RS2	Loxstedt towards Twistringen
Location

Bremerhaven-Wulsdorf is a railway station on the Bremen–Bremerhaven line in the Wulsdorf district of the city of Bremerhaven, Germany.

== History ==
The station was opened in 1862 as part of the Bremen-Geestemünde railway line.

== Operational usage ==
In brief
Number of tracks	2 main line passenger, 2 freight, 2 shunting

The station is only served by RegionalBahn trains. Trains operated by Bremen S-Bahn to Bremen Hbf and Twistringen call at the station. The EVB operate the single-track line to Bremervörde and Buxtehude that branches off the main line at the southern end of the station. The next stop to the south is Loxstedt (code HLOX) on the line to Twistringen, the next station to the east is Sellstedt (ASLL) on the line to Buxtehude. To the north lies Bremerhaven Hauptbahnhof (HBH), a line to Bremerhaven's fishing port (HBHF) branches off to the west some 300 metres (980 ft) north of Wulsdorf station. Passenger access to the station is provided by a stairwell that leads to a street overpass.

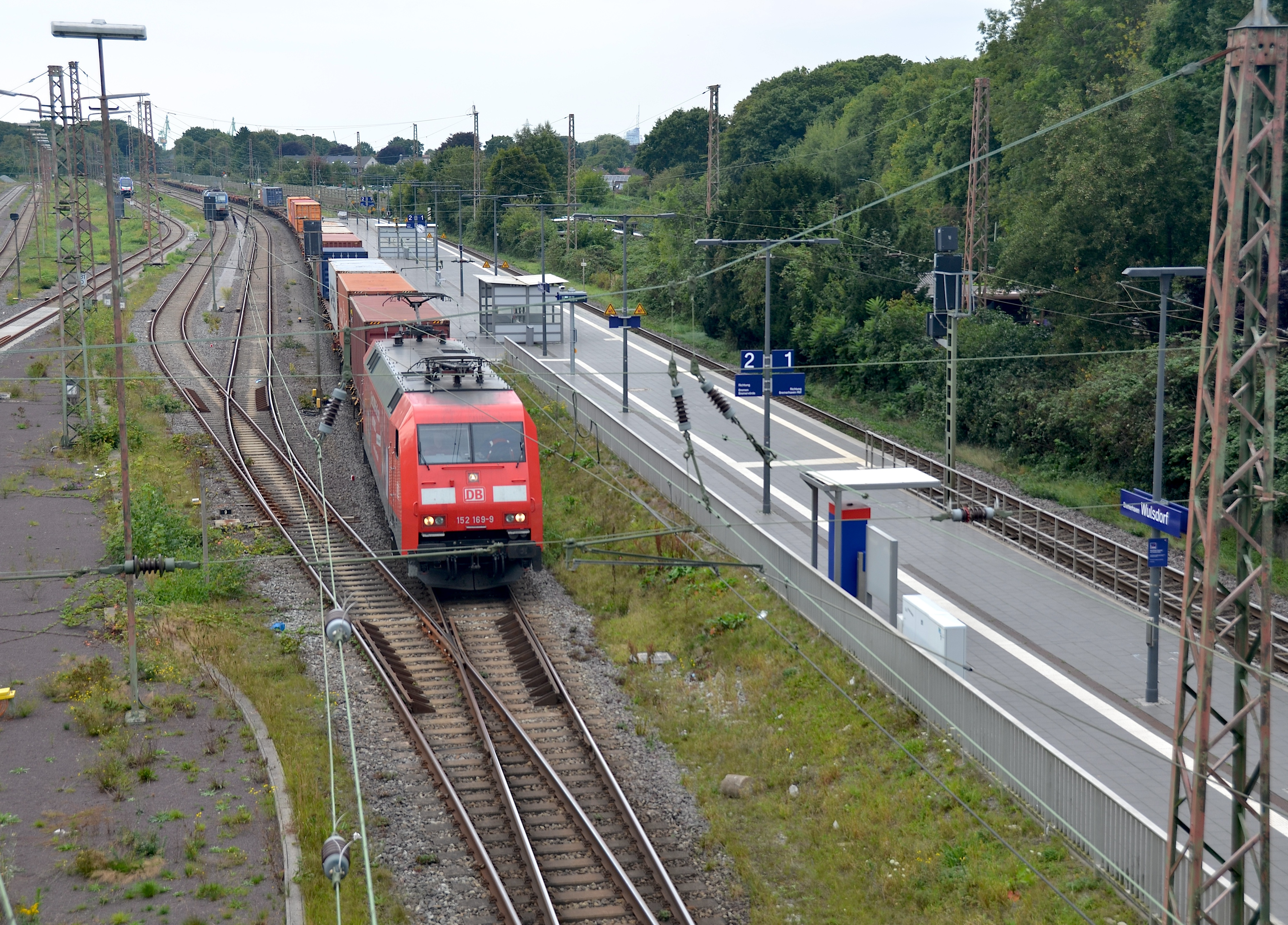
Wulsdorf station
