= Wehdel station =

Railway station in Wehdel, Germany

Coordinates: 53.512156°N 8.807538°E

Wehdel
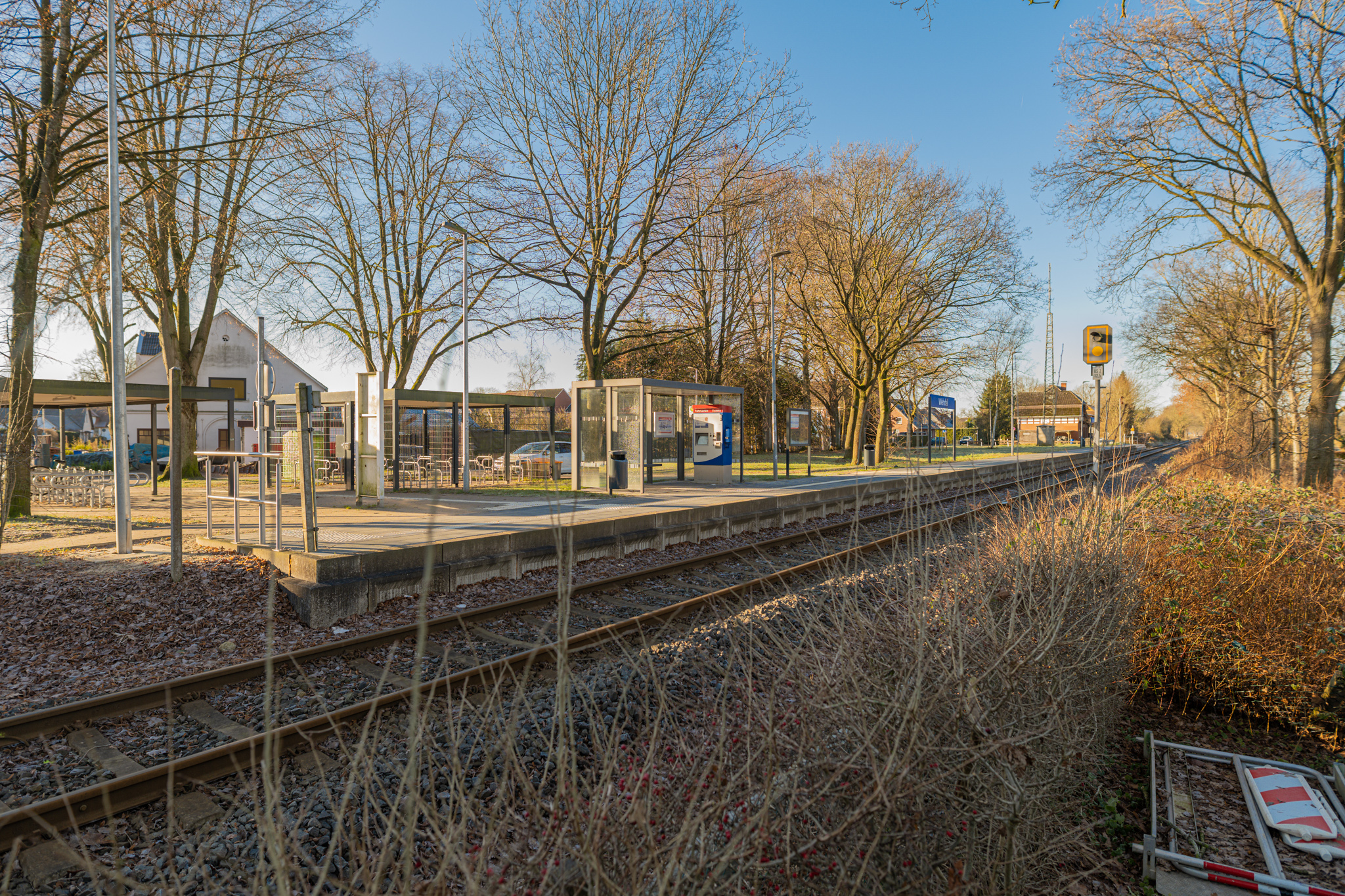

General information
- Location: Wehdel, Schiffdorf, Lower Saxony; Germany
- System: Bf

Other information
- Station code: n/a
- DS100 code: AWHD
- Fare zone: VBN: 265; HVV: H/1259 (VBN transitional tariff, season tickets only)

Services
Preceding station	EVB	Following station
Sellstedt towards Cuxhaven	RB 33	Geestenseth towards Buxtehude
Location

Wehdel is a railway station in northwestern Germany. It is owned and operated by EVB, with regular trains on the line between Bremerhaven and Buxtehude.
