= Brest-Aspe station =

Railway station in Brest, Germany

Brest-Aspe
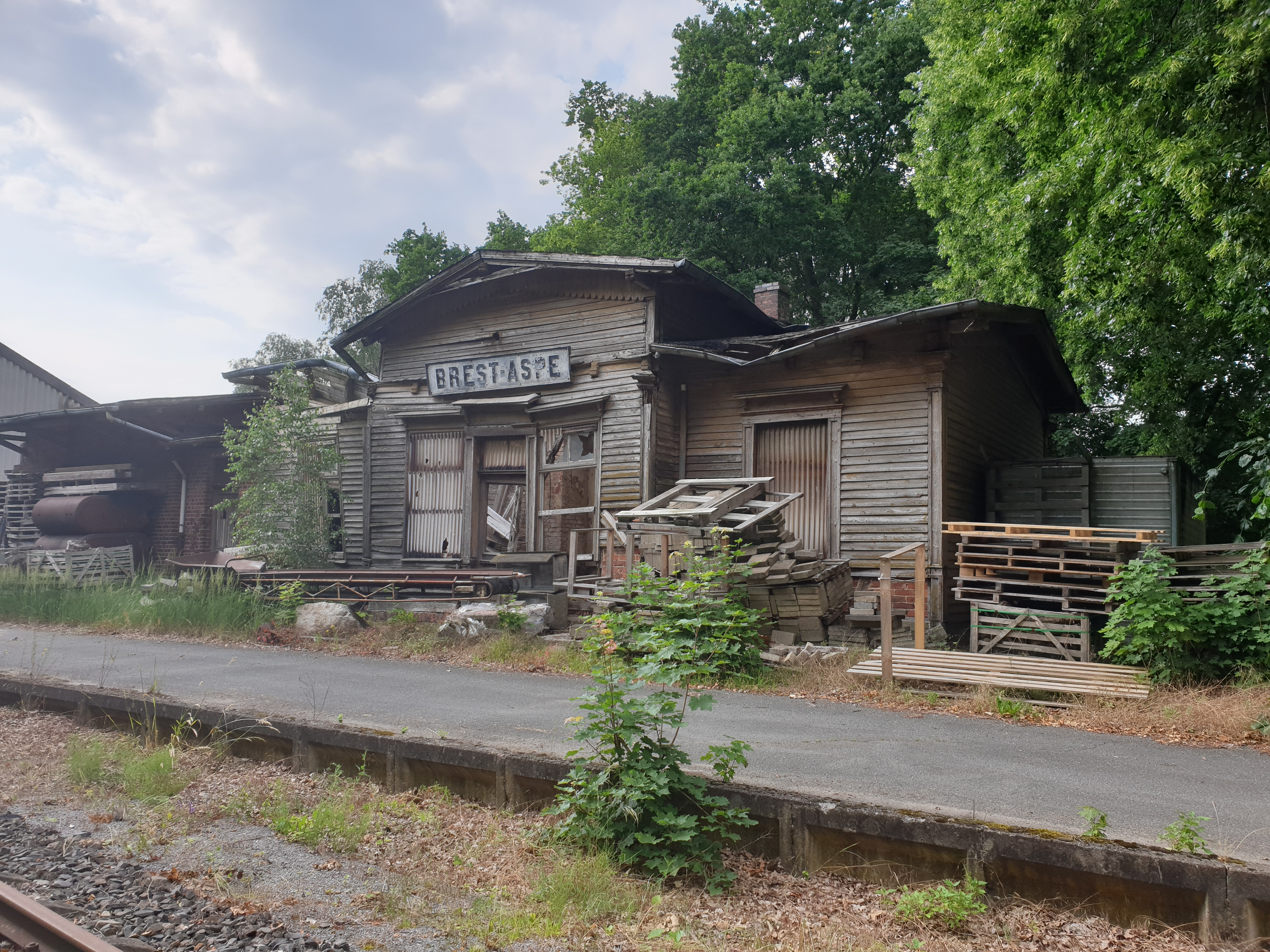
- Disused station building in 2019

General information
- Location: Kutenholz, Lower Saxony; Germany
- Coordinates: 53°27′39″N 9°22′47″E
- System: Bf
- Line: Bremerhaven–Buxtehude railway
- Platforms: 1
- Tracks: 1

Other information
- Station code: n/a
- DS100 code: AAE
- Fare zone: HVV: D and E/759 and 819

Services
Preceding station	EVB	Following station
Kutenholz towards Cuxhaven	RB 33	Bargstedt towards Buxtehude
Location

Brest-Aspe is a railway station in northwestern Germany. It is owned and operated by EVB, with regular trains on the Bremerhaven–Buxtehude railway.

== Train services ==
The station is served by the following services:

- Local services RB 33 Cuxhaven - Bremerhaven - Bremervörde - Buxtehude
