= Frelsdorf station =

Railway station in Frelsdorf, Germany

Coordinates: 53.501277°N 8.900599°E

Frelsdorf

General information
- Location: Frelsdorf, Beverstedt, Lower Saxony; Germany
- System: Bf
- Platforms: 1
- Tracks: 1

Other information
- Station code: n/a
- DS100 code: AFF
- Fare zone: VBN: 230; HVV: G/1159 (VBN transitional tariff, season tickets only)

Services
Preceding station	EVB	Following station
Geestenseth towards Cuxhaven	RB 33	Heinschenwalde towards Buxtehude
Location

Frelsdorf is a railway station in the northwestern Germany. It is owned and operated by EVB, with regular trains on the line between Bremerhaven and Buxtehude.
