= Ruschwedel station =

Railway station in Lower Saxony, Germany

Coordinates: 53.4463°N 9.5604°E

Ruschwedel
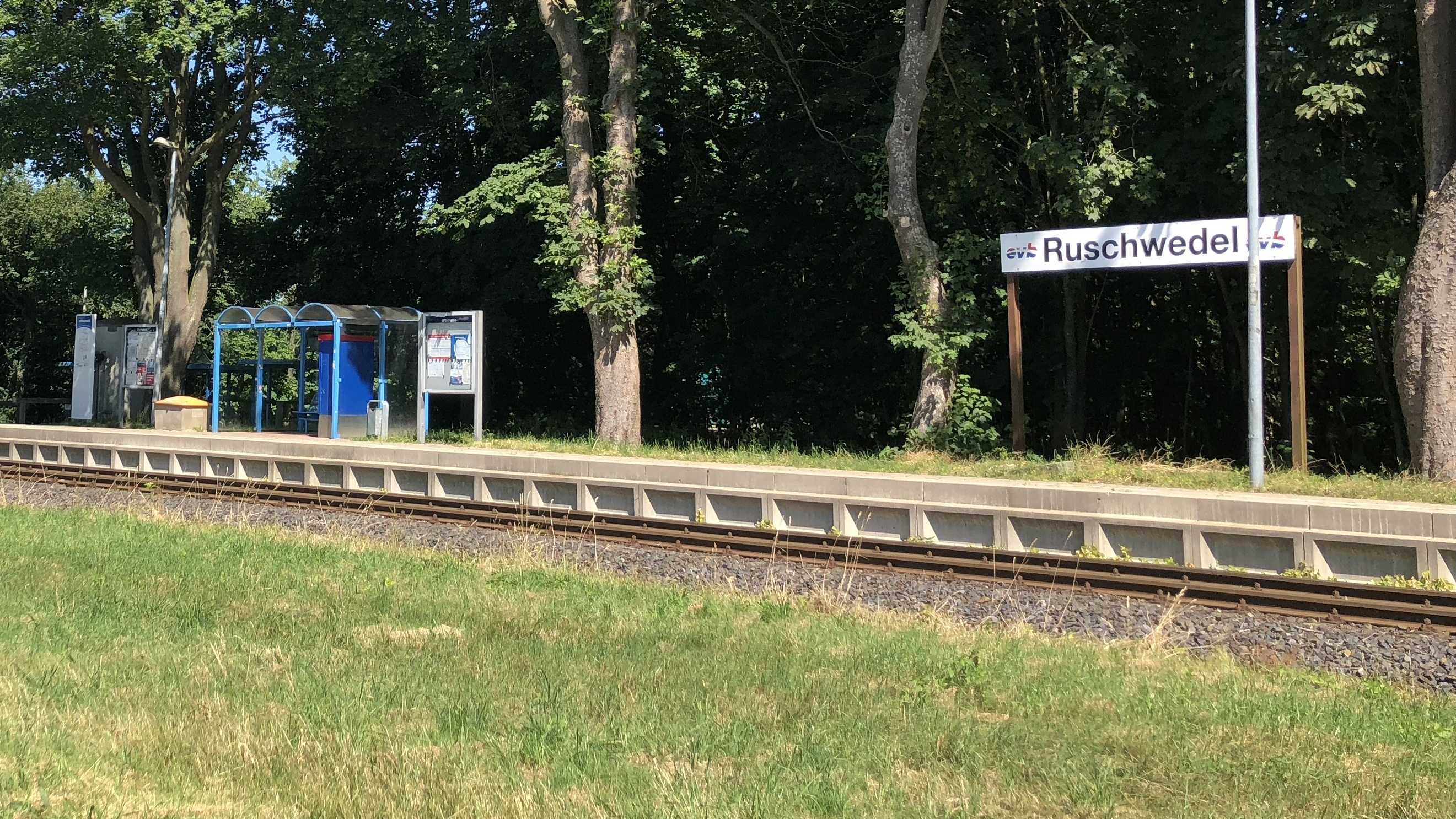
- Station in June 2019

General information
- Location: Ruschwedel, Harsefeld, Lower Saxony; Germany
- System: Bf

Other information
- Station code: n/a
- DS100 code: ARWD
- Fare zone: HVV: D/739 and 749

Services
Preceding station	EVB	Following station
Harsefeld towards Cuxhaven	RB 33	Apensen towards Buxtehude
Location

Ruschwedel is a railway station in northwestern Germany. It is owned and operated by EVB, with regular trains on the line between Bremerhaven and Buxtehude.

== Train services ==
The station is served by the following services:

- Local services RB 33 Cuxhaven - Bremerhaven - Bremervörde - Buxtehude
