= Harsefeld station =

Railway station in Germany

Harsefeld
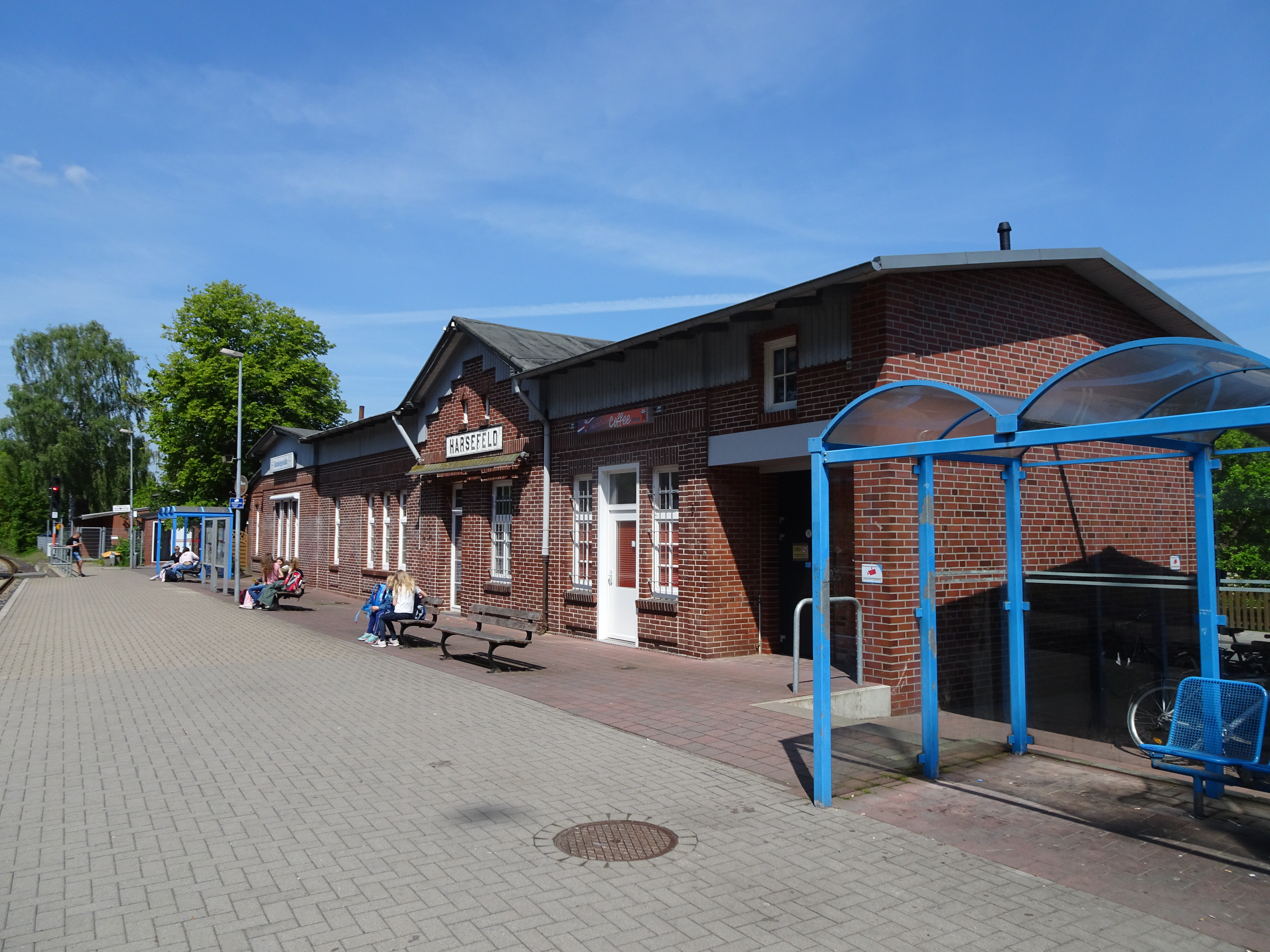
- Station building in 2019

General information
- Location: Harsefeld, Lower Saxony; Germany
- Coordinates: 53°27′1″N 9°29′53″E
- System: Bf

Other information
- Station code: n/a
- DS100 code: AHFD
- Fare zone: HVV: D/749

Services
Preceding station	EVB	Following station
Bargstedt towards Cuxhaven	RB 33	Ruschwedel towards Buxtehude
Location

Harsefeld is a railway station in northwestern Germany. It is owned and operated by EVB, with regular trains on the line between Bremerhaven and Buxtehude.

== Train services ==
The station is served by the following services:

- Local services RB 33 Cuxhaven - Bremerhaven - Bremervörde - Buxtehude
