= Oerel station =

Railway station in Oerel, Germany

Coordinates: 53.493956°N 9.032543°E

Oerel

General information
- Location: Oerel, Geestequelle, Lower Saxony; Germany
- System: Bf

Other information
- Station code: n/a
- DS100 code: AOE
- Fare zone: HVV: F/1059

Services
Preceding station	EVB	Following station
Heinschenwalde towards Cuxhaven	RB 33	Bremervörde towards Buxtehude
Location

Oerel is a railway station in northwestern Germany. It is owned and operated by EVB, with regular trains on the line between Bremerhaven and Hamburg-Neugraben.
