= Hesedorf station =

Railway station in Bremervörde, Germany

Coordinates: 53.4726°N 9.1950°E

Hesedorf
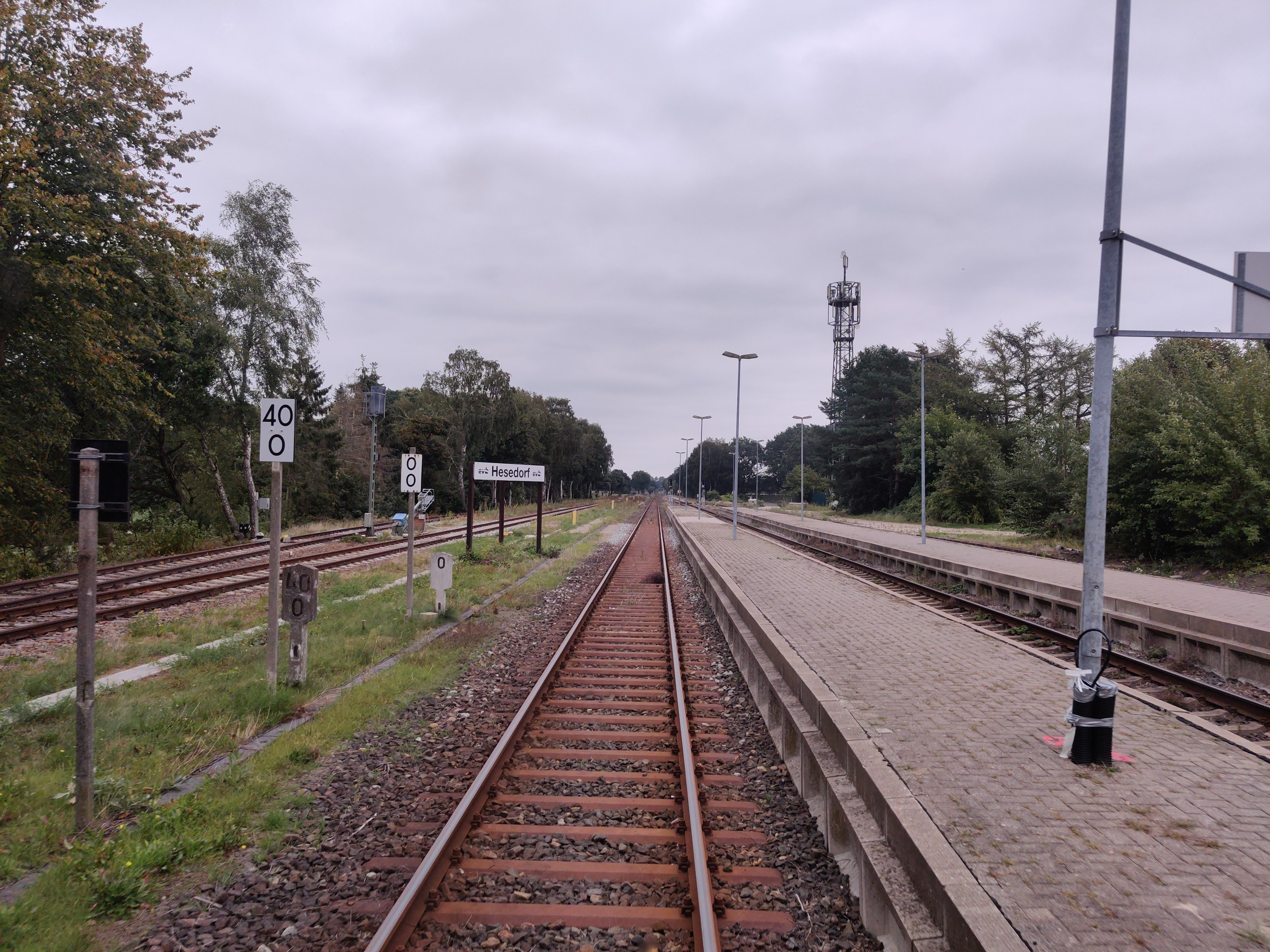
- Hesedorf railway station, 15 September 2019

General information
- Location: Hesedorf, Bremervörde, Lower Saxony; Germany
- System: Bf

Other information
- Station code: n/a
- DS100 code: AHOF
- Fare zone: HVV: E/959

Services
Preceding station	EVB	Following station
Bremervörde towards Cuxhaven	RB 33	Kutenholz towards Buxtehude
Bremervörde towards Bremen Hbf	Moor Express	Mulsum towards Stade
Location

Hesedorf is a railway station in northwestern Germany. It is owned and operated by EVB, with regular trains on the line between Bremerhaven and Hamburg-Neugraben.
