= Bargstedt station =

Railway station in Bargstedt, Germany

Bargstedt

General information
- Location: Bargstedt, Harsefeld, Lower Saxony; Germany
- Coordinates: 53°27′27″N 9°26′45″E
- System: Bf
- Line: Bremerhaven–Buxtehude railway

Other information
- Station code: n/a
- DS100 code: ABAT
- Fare zone: HVV: D/749 and 759

Services
Preceding station	EVB	Following station
Brest-Aspe towards Cuxhaven	RB 33	Harsefeld towards Buxtehude
Location

Bargstedt is a railway station in northwestern Germany. It is owned and operated by EVB, with regular trains on the Bremerhaven–Buxtehude railway.

== Train services ==
The station is served by the following services:

- Local services RB 33 Cuxhaven - Bremerhaven - Bremervörde - Buxtehude
