= Heinschenwalde station =

Railway station in Hipstedt, Germany

Coordinates: 53.498635°N 8.972236°E

Heinschenwalde
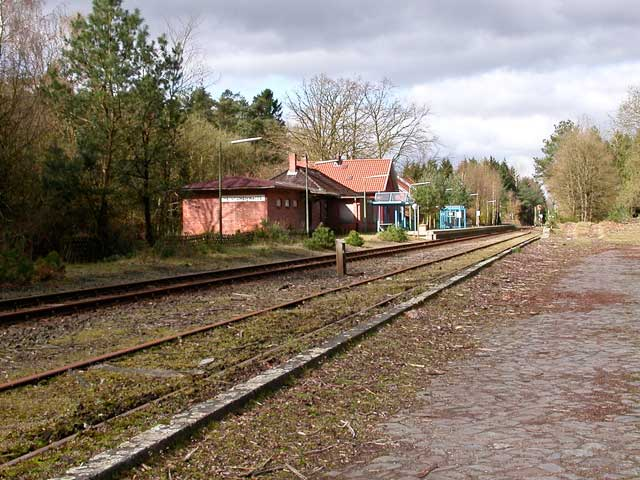
- Heinschenwalde station in 2008

General information
- Location: Heinschenwalde, Hipstedt, Lower Saxony; Germany
- System: Bf
- Line: Bremerhaven–Buxtehude railway
- Platforms: 1
- Tracks: 1

Other information
- Station code: n/a
- DS100 code: AHWA
- Fare zone: HVV: F/1059

Services
Preceding station	EVB	Following station
Frelsdorf towards Cuxhaven	RB 33	Oerel towards Buxtehude
Location

Heinschenwalde is a railway station in northwestern Germany. It is owned and operated by EVB, with regular trains on the line between Bremerhaven and Buxtehude.

== Train services ==
The station is served by the following services:

- Local services RB 33 Cuxhaven - Bremerhaven - Bremervörde - Buxtehude
