= Apensen station =

Railway station in Apensen, Germany

Apensen

General information
- Location: Apensen, Lower Saxony; Germany
- Coordinates: 53°26′30″N 9°36′44″E
- System: Bf

Other information
- Station code: n/a
- DS100 code: AAPS
- Fare zone: HVV: D/739

Services
Preceding station	EVB	Following station
Ruschwedel towards Cuxhaven	RB 33	Buxtehude Terminus
Location

Apensen is a railway station, located in the municipality Apensen, Lower Saxony, in northwestern Germany. It is owned and operated by EVB, with regular trains on the line between Bremerhaven and Buxtehude.

As of 2009, the station was included in the fare zone of the Hamburger Verkehrsverbund.

== Train services ==
The station is served by the following services:

- Local services RB 33 Cuxhaven - Bremerhaven - Bremervörde - Buxtehude
