= Bremerhaven–Cuxhaven railway =

Railway line in Germany

Bremerhaven–Cuxhaven

Overview
- Native name: Nordseebahn
- Line number: KBS 125

Service
- Operator(s): Eisenbahnen und Verkehrsbetriebe Elbe-Weser (EVB)

Technical
- Line length: 37.7 km (23.4 mi)
- Track gauge: 1,435 mm (4 ft 8 1/2 in) standard gauge

The Bremerhaven–Cuxhaven railway, also called the North Sea Railway (German: Nordseebahn), is a railway line between Bremerhaven and Cuxhaven, opened in 1899. Eisenbahnen und Verkehrsbetriebe Elbe-Weser (EVB) operates passenger services.

== Operation ==
Eisenbahnen und Verkehrsbetriebe Elbe-Weser (EVB) operates an hourly regional service between Cuxhaven and Bremerhaven Hauptbahnhof.
