= Bremervörde station =

Railway station in Bremervörde, Germany

Bremervörde
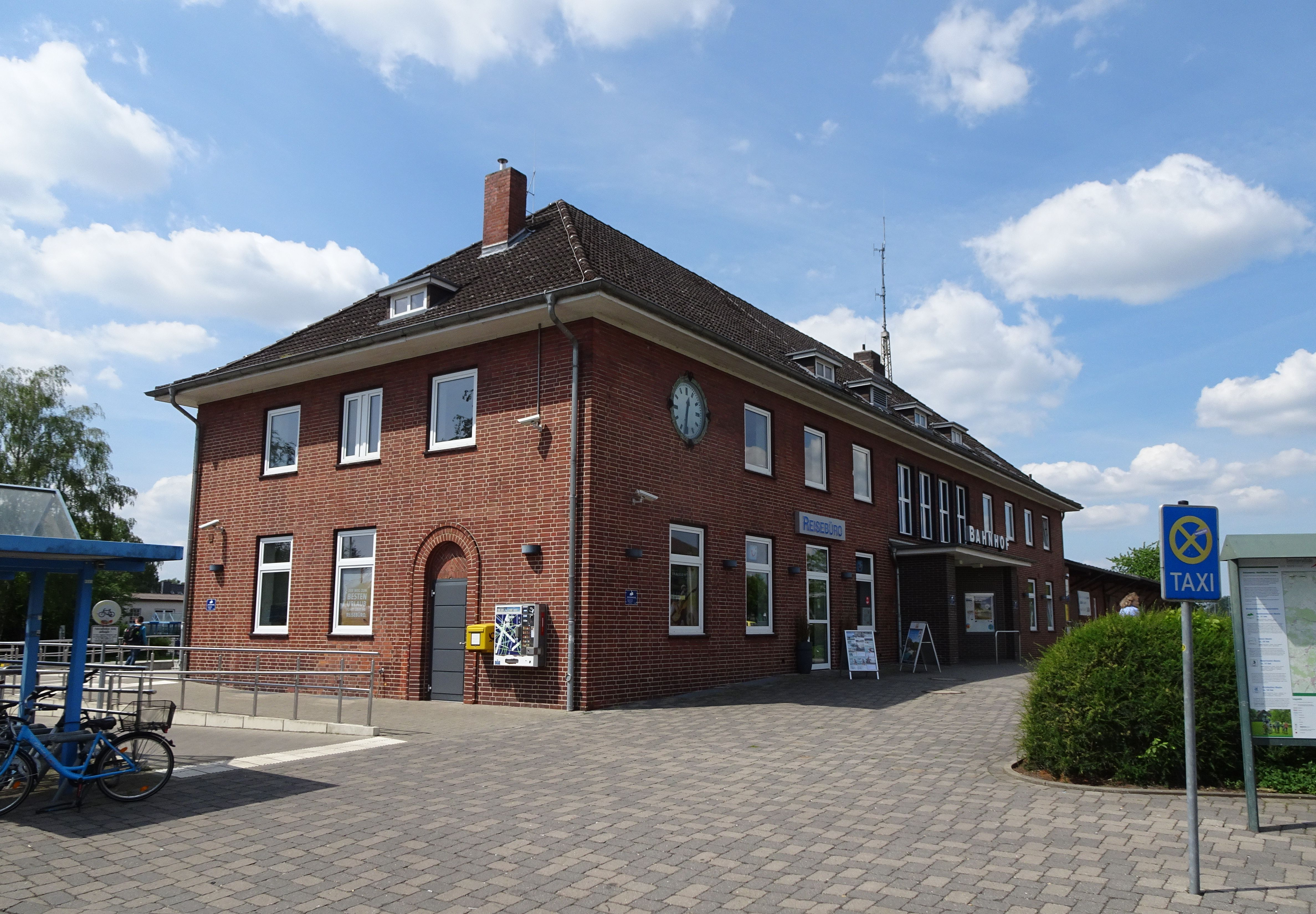
- Bremervörde station in 2019

General information
- Location: Bremervörde, Lower Saxony; Germany
- Coordinates: 53.482823°N 9.14084°E

Other information
- Station code: n/a
- DS100 code: ABV
- Fare zone: HVV: E/959

Services
Preceding station	EVB	Following station
Oerel towards Cuxhaven	RB 33	Hesedorf towards Buxtehude
Barchel towards Bremen Hbf	Moor Express	Hesedorf towards Stade
Location

Bremervörde is a railway station in northwestern Germany. It is owned and operated by EVB, with regular trains on the Bremerhaven–Buxtehude railway. The Moorexpress heritage service also calls at the station on summer weekends.

The station was modernised for a total amount of € 340,000 in 2006 and features a travel agency and a bistro. It is a non-smoking station and equipped with a CCTV system.

== Train services ==
The station is served by the following services:

- Local services RB 33 Cuxhaven - Bremerhaven - Bremervörde - Buxtehude
