= Loxstedt station =

Railway station in Loxstedt, Germany

Coordinates: 53°28′23″N 8°39′23″E

Loxstedt
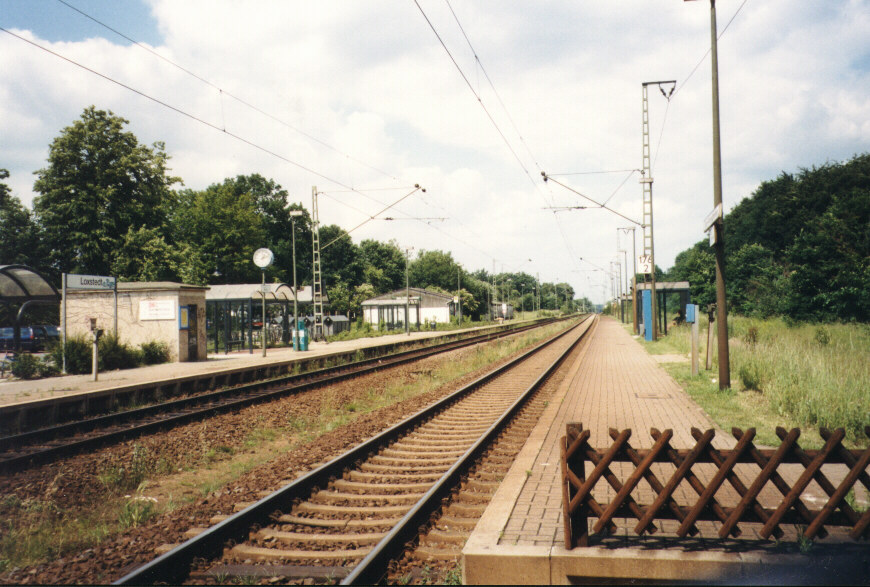
- The station in 1998

General information
- Location: Loxstedt, Lower Saxony; Germany
- Platforms: 2

Other information
- Station code: 3799
- DS100 code: HLOX
- IBNR: 03760
- Category: 6
- Fare zone: VBN: 240

History
- Opened: 1847

Services
Preceding station	Bremen S-Bahn	Following station
Bremerhaven-Wulsdorf towards Bremerhaven-Lehe	RS2	Lunestedt towards Twistringen
Location

Loxstedt is a railway station on the Bremerhaven-Bremen line in northwestern Germany. The station is situated in the town of Loxstedt, in the Cuxhaven district of Lower Saxony.

The station was opened in 1847 as part of the Bremen to Wulsdorf railway line. On 10 March 1862, the station building was inaugurated, featuring two flats for the stationmaster and signalmen as well as a freight shed and several outbuildings. In the early 20th century, the station saw some long-distance trains to destinations as far away as Berlin and Hanover. In 1966, the railway line was electrified, freight service was stopped in 1975 and the old station building as well as the signal box Lsf stood empty until they were torn down shortly before Christmas 1978.

== The station today ==
Since 2010, Bremen S-Bahn trains from Bremerhaven to Twistringen call at the station. It features a park and ride facility and a bus stop. Park and ride facilities were added after the municipality bought the site of the former station building from Deutsche Bahn AG in 1996. Since October 2014, platforms are being raised from a height of 38 cm to 76 cm to allow step-free access to the Alstom Coradia Continental multiple units calling at the station. Access to the platforms is currently provided by a level crossing on the southern side of the station.

Loxstedt is an example for a category 6 railway station (the second lowest category in Germany)
