= Fredenbeck (Samtgemeinde) =

- Samtgemeinde
- Location of Fredenbeck within Stade district
- Interactive map of Fredenbeck
- Location within Germany Location within Lower Saxony
- Coordinates: 53°31′N 09°23′E
- Country: Germany
- State: Lower Saxony
- District: Stade
- Seat: Fredenbeck
- Subdivisions: 3 municipalities

Area
  - Total: 144.08 km^{2} (55.63 sq mi)

Population (2025-12-31)
  - Total: 13,297
  - Density: 92.289/km^{2} (239.03/sq mi)
- Time zone: UTC+01:00 (CET)
  - Summer (DST): UTC+02:00 (CEST)
- Website: www.fredenbeck.de

Fredenbeck is a Samtgemeinde ("collective municipality") in the district of Stade, in Lower Saxony, Germany. Its seat is in the village Fredenbeck.

The Samtgemeinde Fredenbeck consists of the following municipalities:

1. Deinste
2. Fredenbeck
3. Kutenholz
