= Wissingen station =

Railway station in Bissendorf, Germany

Coordinates: 52°15′29″N 8°12′15″E

Wissingen
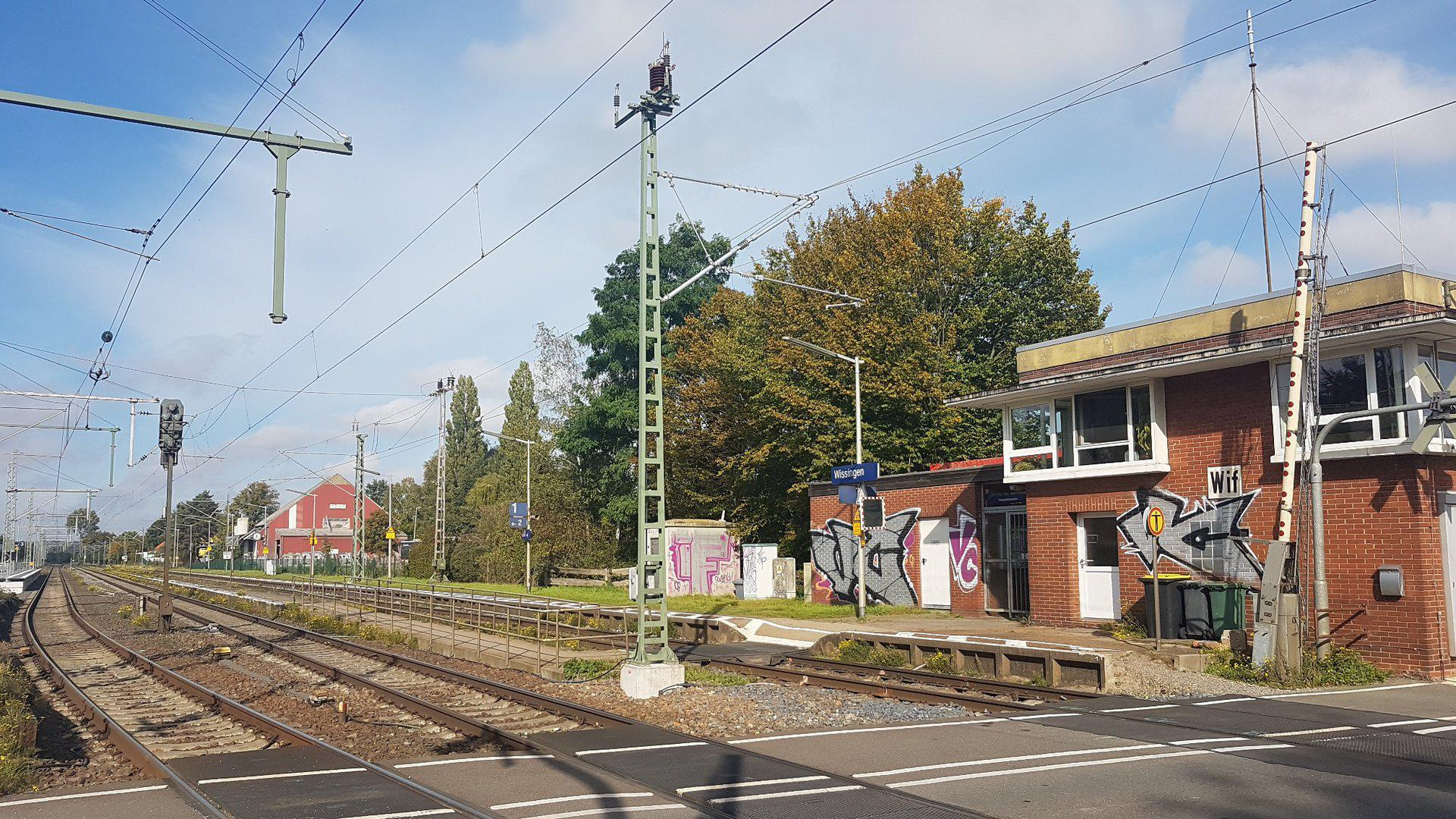

General information
- Location: Bissendorf, Lower Saxony; Germany
- Line: Löhne–Rheine railway
- Platforms: 2

Other information
- Station code: n/a
- Category: 5
- Fare zone: VOS: 352 (buses only)
- Website: www.bahnhof.de
Location

Wissingen is a railway station located in Wissingen, municipality Bissendorf, Germany. The station is located on the Löhne-Rheine railway. The train services are operated by WestfalenBahn.

== Train services ==
The following services currently call at Wissingen:

- Wiehengebirgs-Bahn Bad Bentheim - Rheine - Osnabrück - Herford - Bielefeld

Preceding station		Following station
Osnabrück Hbf towards Hengelo	RB 61	Westerhausen towards Bielefeld Hbf
