= Westerhausen station =

Railway station in Melle, Germany

Coordinates: 52°14′11″N 8°16′46″E

Westerhausen
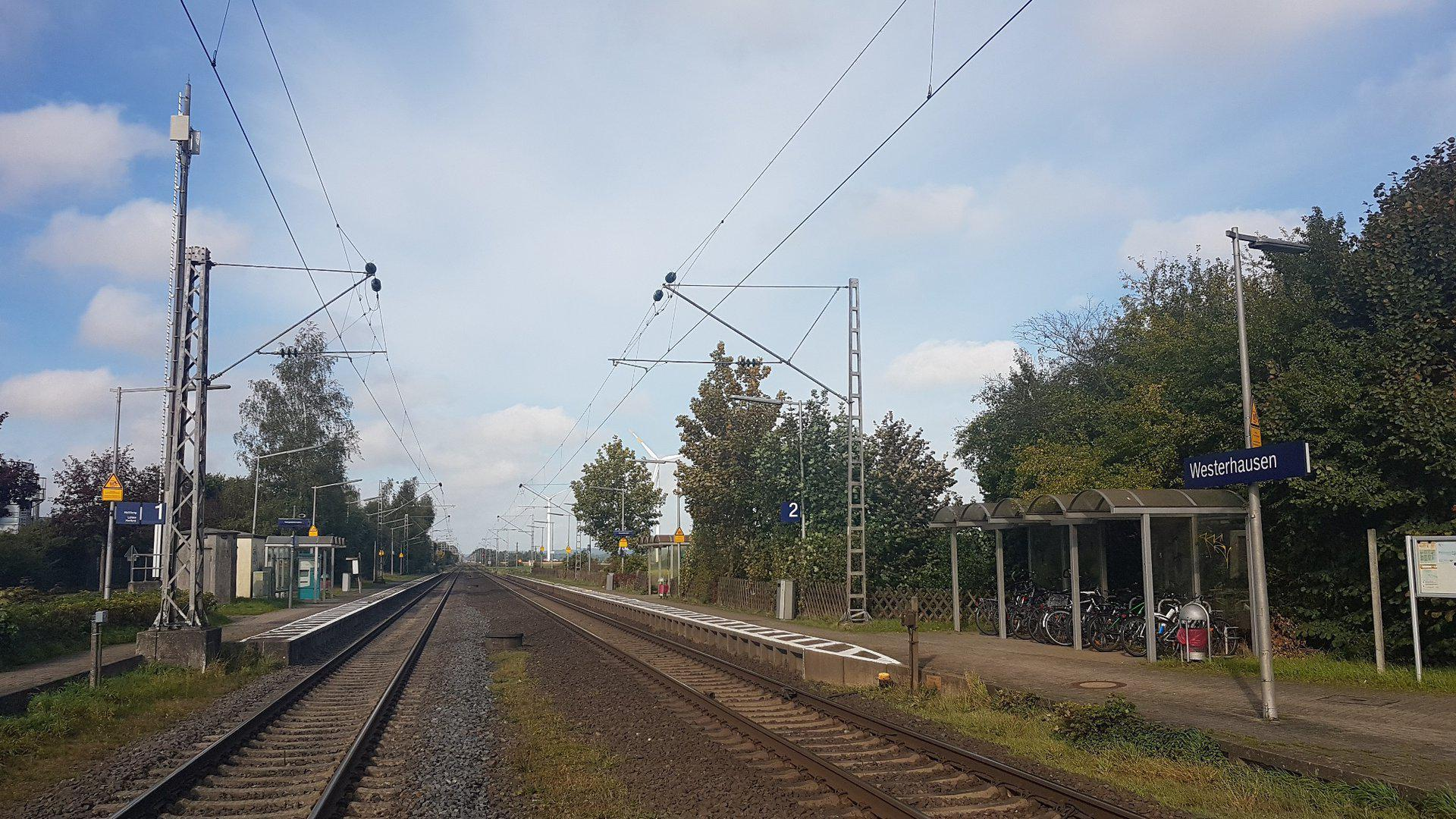

General information
- Location: Westerhausen, Lower Saxony; Germany
- Line: Löhne–Rheine railway
- Platforms: 2

Other information
- Station code: n/a
- Category: 5
- Fare zone: VOS: 363 (buses only)
- Website: www.bahnhof.de
Location

Westerhausen is a railway station located in Westerhausen, Germany. The station is located on the Löhne-Rheine railway. The train services are operated by WestfalenBahn.

== Train services ==
The following services currently call at Westerhausen:

- Wiehengebirgs-Bahn Bad Bentheim - Rheine - Osnabrück - Herford - Bielefeld

Preceding station		Following station
Wissingen towards Hengelo	RB 61	Melle towards Bielefeld Hbf
