= Lemförde station =

Railway station in Lemförde, Germany

Lemförde

General information
- Location: Lemförde, Lower Saxony; Germany
- Coordinates: 52.4602°N 8.3621°E
- Line: Wanne-Eickel–Hamburg railway
- Platforms: 2

Other information
- Fare zone: VBN: 570

Services
| Preceding station | DB Regio Nord | Following station |
|---|---|---|
| Diepholz towards Bremerhaven-Lehe | RE 9 | Bohmte towards Osnabrück Hbf |
Location

Lemförde (German: Bahnhof Lemförde) is a railway station located in Lemförde, Germany. The station is located on the Wanne-Eickel–Hamburg railway. The train services are operated by Deutsche Bahn.

== Train services ==
The following services currently call at the station:

- Regional services RE 9 Bremerhaven-Lehe - Bremen - Osnabrück
