= Diepholz station =

Railway station in Diepholz, Germany

Diepholz
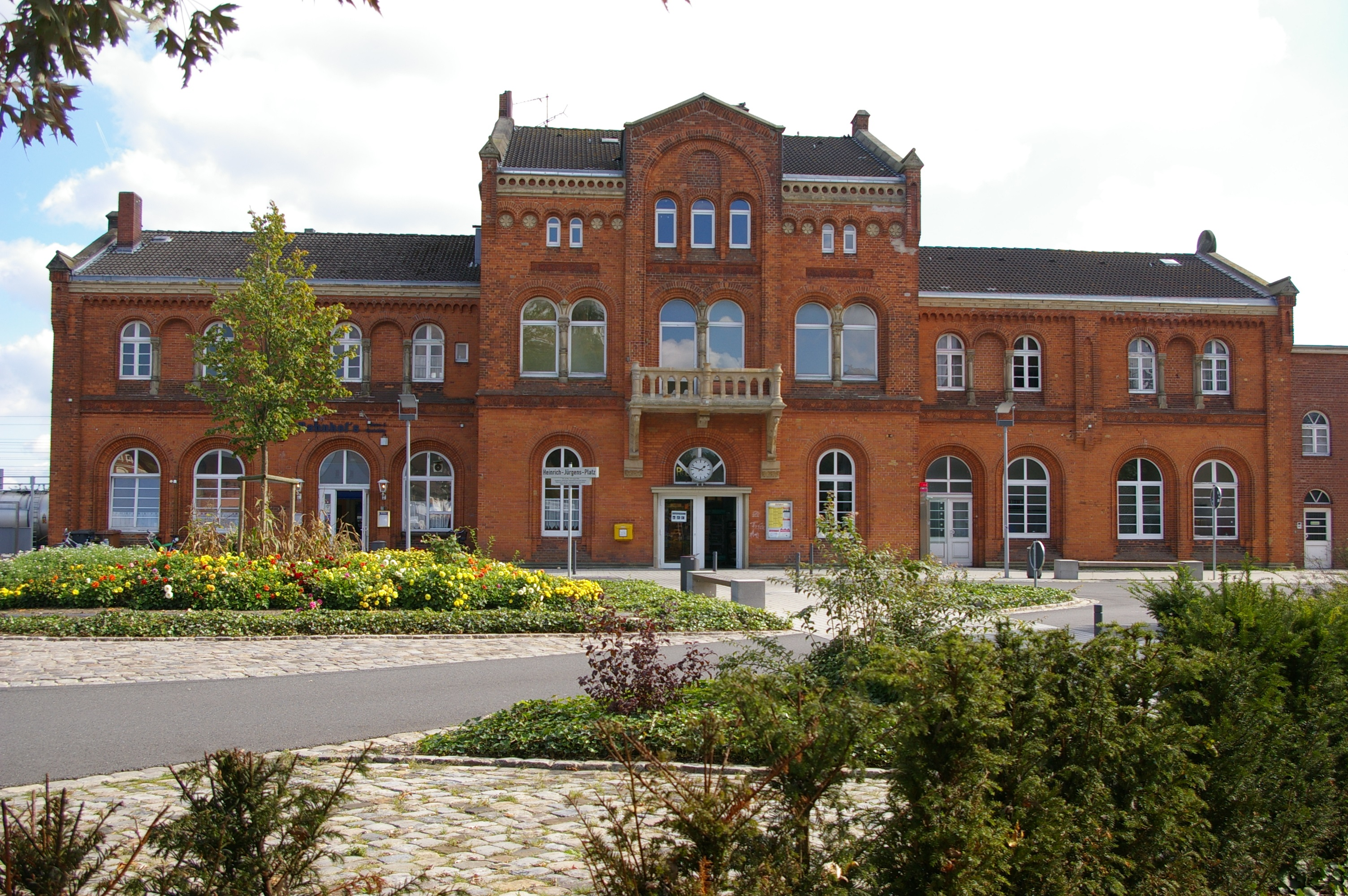
- Diepholz railway station

General information
- Location: Diepholz, Lower Saxony; Germany
- Coordinates: 52.6050°N 8.3802°E
- Line: Wanne-Eickel–Hamburg railway
- Platforms: 3

Construction
- Accessible: Yes

Other information
- Fare zone: VBN: 560
- Website: www.bahnhof.de

Services
| Preceding station | DB Fernverkehr | Following station |
|---|---|---|
| Osnabrück Hbf One-way operation | ICE 14 | Bremen Hbf towards Hamburg Hbf |
| Preceding station | DB Regio Nord | Following station |
| Barnstorf towards Bremerhaven-Lehe | RE 9 | Lemförde towards Osnabrück Hbf |
Location

Diepholz (German: Bahnhof Diepholz) is a railway station located in Diepholz, Germany. The station is located on the Wanne-Eickel–Hamburg railway. The train services are operated by Deutsche Bahn.

== Train services ==
The following services currently call at the station:

- Regional services RE 9 Bremerhaven-Lehe - Bremen - Osnabrück
- A limited number of Intercity/EuroCity services call at the station
