= Schierbrok station =

Railway station in Ganderkesee, Germany

Schierbrok
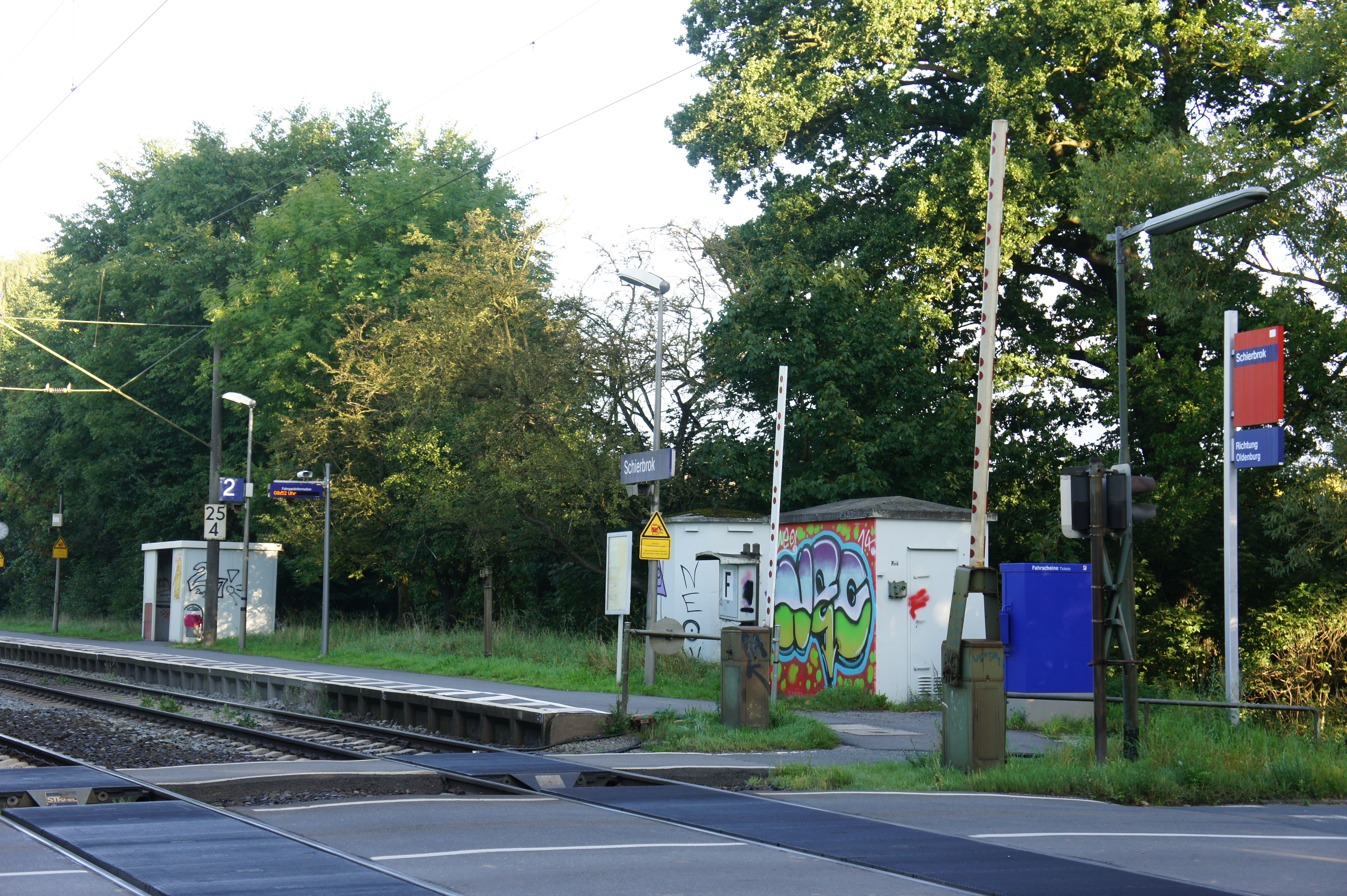
- Schierbrok station in 2015

General information
- Location: Schierbrok, Lower Saxony; Germany
- Coordinates: 53.08494°N 8.57859°E
- Line: Oldenburg–Bremen railway
- Platforms: 2

Other information
- Fare zone: VBN: 720

Services
Preceding station	Bremen S-Bahn	Following station
Bookholzberg towards Bad Zwischenahn	RS3	Hoykenkamp towards Bremen Hbf
Bookholzberg towards Nordenham	RS4	Hoykenkamp towards Bremen Hbf
Location

Schierbrok (German: Bahnhof Schierbrok) is a railway station located in Schierbrok, Germany. The station is located on the Oldenburg–Bremen railway. The train services are operated by NordWestBahn. The station has been part of the Bremen S-Bahn since December 2010.

== Train services ==
The following services currently call at the station:

- Bremen S-Bahn services RS3 Bad Zwischenahn - Oldenburg - Delmenhorst - Bremen
