= Barnstorf station =

Railway station in Barnstorf, Germany

Barnstorf

General information
- Location: Barnstorf, Lower Saxony; Germany
- Coordinates: 52.7075°N 8.5101°E
- Line: Wanne-Eickel–Hamburg railway
- Platforms: 2

Other information
- Fare zone: VBN: 550

Services
Preceding station	DB Regio Nord	Following station
Twistringen towards Bremerhaven-Lehe	RE 9	Diepholz towards Osnabrück Hbf
Location

Barnstorf (German: Bahnhof Barnstorf) is a railway station located in Barnstorf, Germany. The station is located on the Wanne-Eickel–Hamburg railway. The train services are operated by Deutsche Bahn.

== Train services ==
The following services currently call at the station:

- Regional services RE 9 Bremerhaven-Lehe - Bremen - Osnabrück
