= Fredenbeck =

- Municipality
- Coat of arms

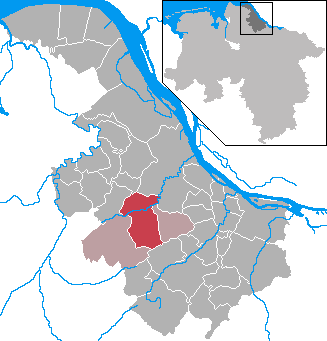
- Location of Fredenbeck within Stade district
- Interactive map of Fredenbeck
- Location within Germany Location within Lower Saxony
- Coordinates: 53°31′33″N 9°24′26″E
- Country: Germany
- State: Lower Saxony
- District: Stade
- Municipal assoc.: Fredenbeck
- Subdivisions: 4

Government
  - Mayor: Diedrich Wohlers (CDU)

Area
  - Total: 48.62 km^{2} (18.77 sq mi)
- Elevation: 10 m (33 ft)

Population (2025-12-31)
  - Total: 6,539
  - Density: 134.5/km^{2} (348.3/sq mi)
- Time zone: UTC+01:00 (CET)
  - Summer (DST): UTC+02:00 (CEST)
- Postal codes: 21717
- Dialling codes: 04149
- Vehicle registration: STD
- Website: www.fredenbeck.de

Fredenbeck (German pronunciation: [ˈfʁeːdn̩beːk]; Low German: Freenbeek) is a municipality northwest of Hamburg, Germany, in the district of Stade in Lower Saxony.

It belonged to the Prince-Archbishopric of Bremen. In 1648 the Prince-Archbishopric was transformed into the Duchy of Bremen, which was first ruled in personal union by the Swedish and from 1715 on by the Hanoverian Crown. In 1823 the Duchy was abolished and its territory became part of the Stade Region.

Fredenbeck is also the seat of the Samtgemeinde ("collective municipality") Fredenbeck.
