= Bohmte station =

Railway station in Bohmte, Germany

Bohmte
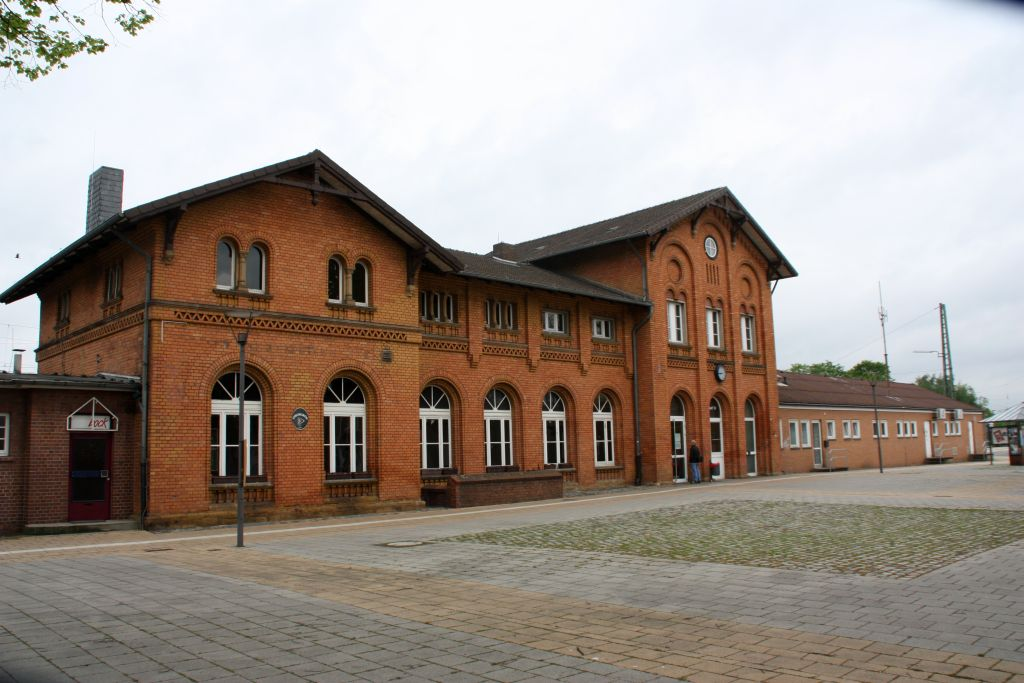
- Bohmte railway station

General information
- Location: Bohmte, Lower Saxony; Germany
- Coordinates: 52.3609°N 8.3077°E
- Line: Wanne-Eickel–Hamburg railway
- Platforms: 3

Other information
- Fare zone: VOS: 228 (buses only)

Services
Preceding station	DB Regio Nord	Following station
Lemförde towards Bremerhaven-Lehe	RE 9	Osnabrück Hbf Terminus
Location

Bohmte (German: Bahnhof Bohmte) is a railway station located in Bohmte, Germany. The station is located on the Wanne-Eickel–Hamburg railway. The train services are operated by Deutsche Bahn.

== Train services ==
The following services currently call at the station:

- Regional services RE 9 Bremerhaven-Lehe - Bremen - Osnabrück
