= Lower Elbe Railway =

Railway line in Germany

- The Lower Elbe Railway in Northern Germany

Overview
- Line number: 1720

Service
- Route number: 121

Technical
- Line length: 103 km
- Track gauge: 1,435 mm (4 ft 8 1/2 in)
- Electrification: 15 kV, 16.7 Hz
- Operating speed: 160 km/h
- Maximum incline: 20 ‰

The Lower Elbe Railway (German: Niederelbebahn or Unterelbebahn), is a railway line between Hamburg and Cuxhaven in northwestern Germany, which was opened in 1881 by the Lower Elbe Railway Company (Unterelbesche Eisenbahngesellschaft). At 103.6 kilometres of length, the line runs close to the southern bank of the Lower Elbe river.

== Line features ==
The Lower Elbe Railway is a main line since 1964 and is currently listed as Kursbuchstrecke 121. The line is part of the Strecke 1720, with the kilometrage starting at Lehrte near Hanover.

The line features two tracks on most sections, except between the stations Himmelpforten and Hechthausen. The line has been electrified between Hamburg and Stade since 1968.

The Hamburg S-Bahn line to Neugraben runs parallel to the line since 1984; and since 2008, toward Stade, using dual-voltage vehicles.

The trains between Cuxhaven and Hamburg have been operated by metronom since late 2007.

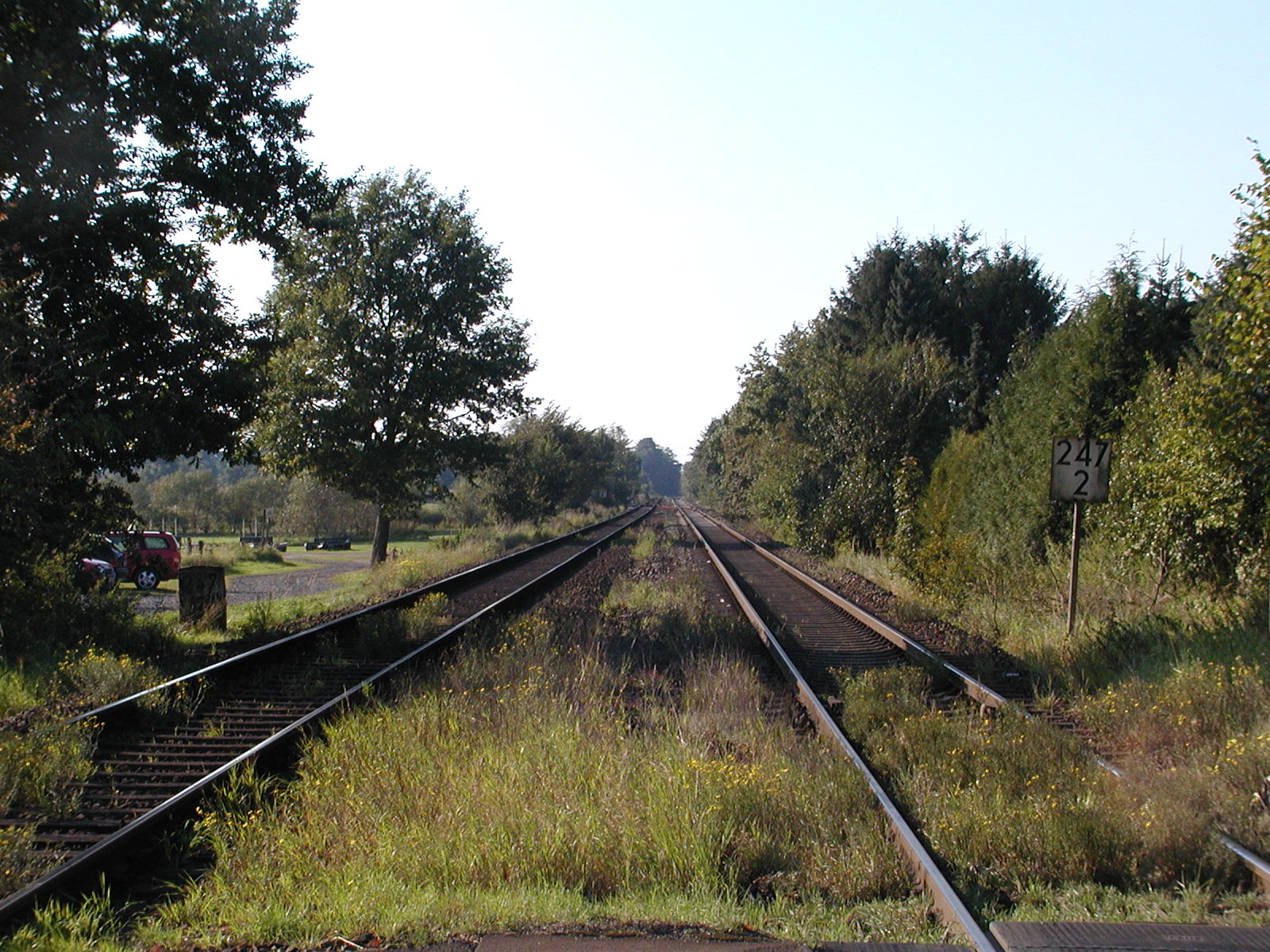
Lower Elbe Railway in Cadenberge

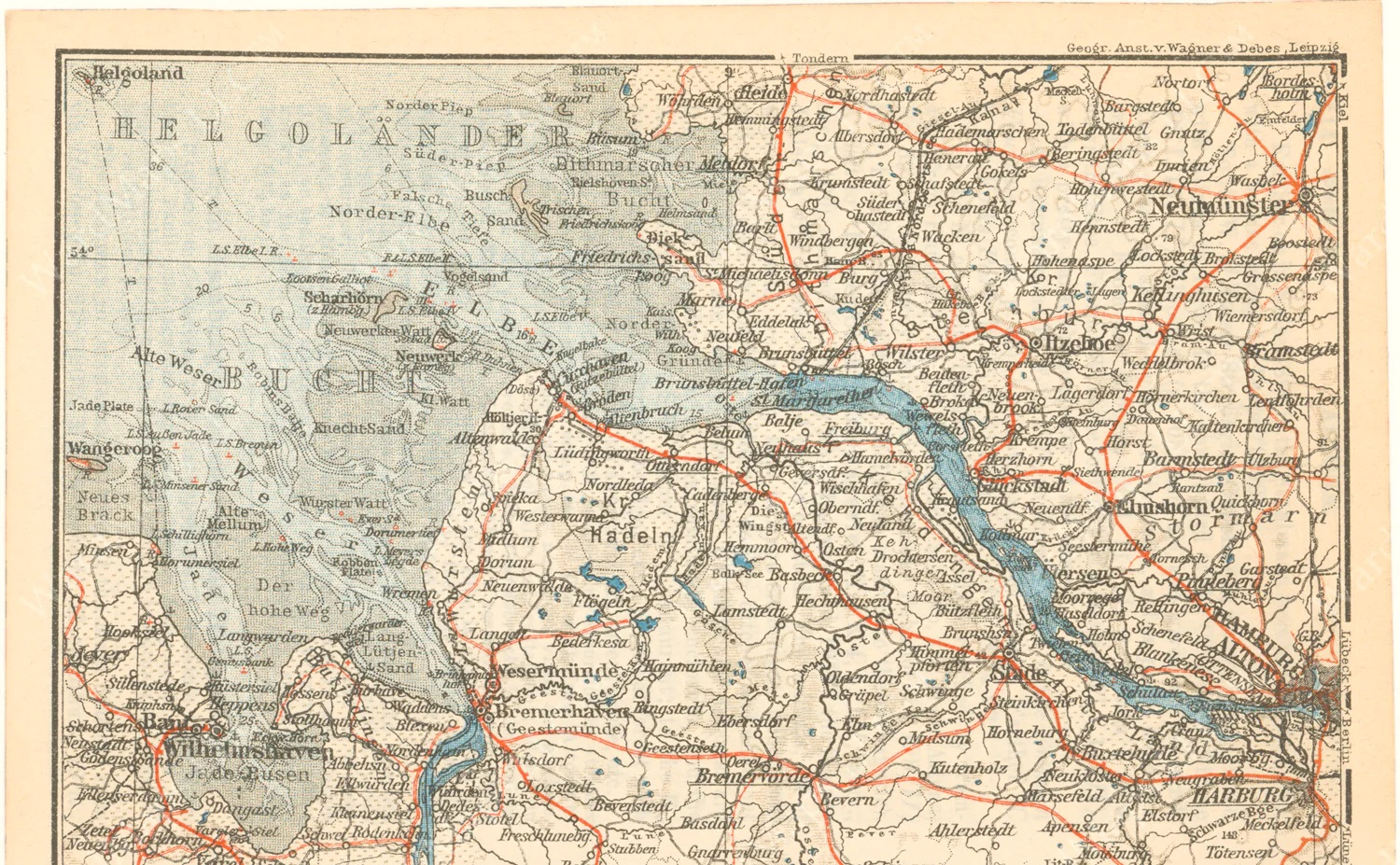
Lower Elbe and Lower Elbe Railway on a 1910 map
Trail between Belum and Kedingbruch

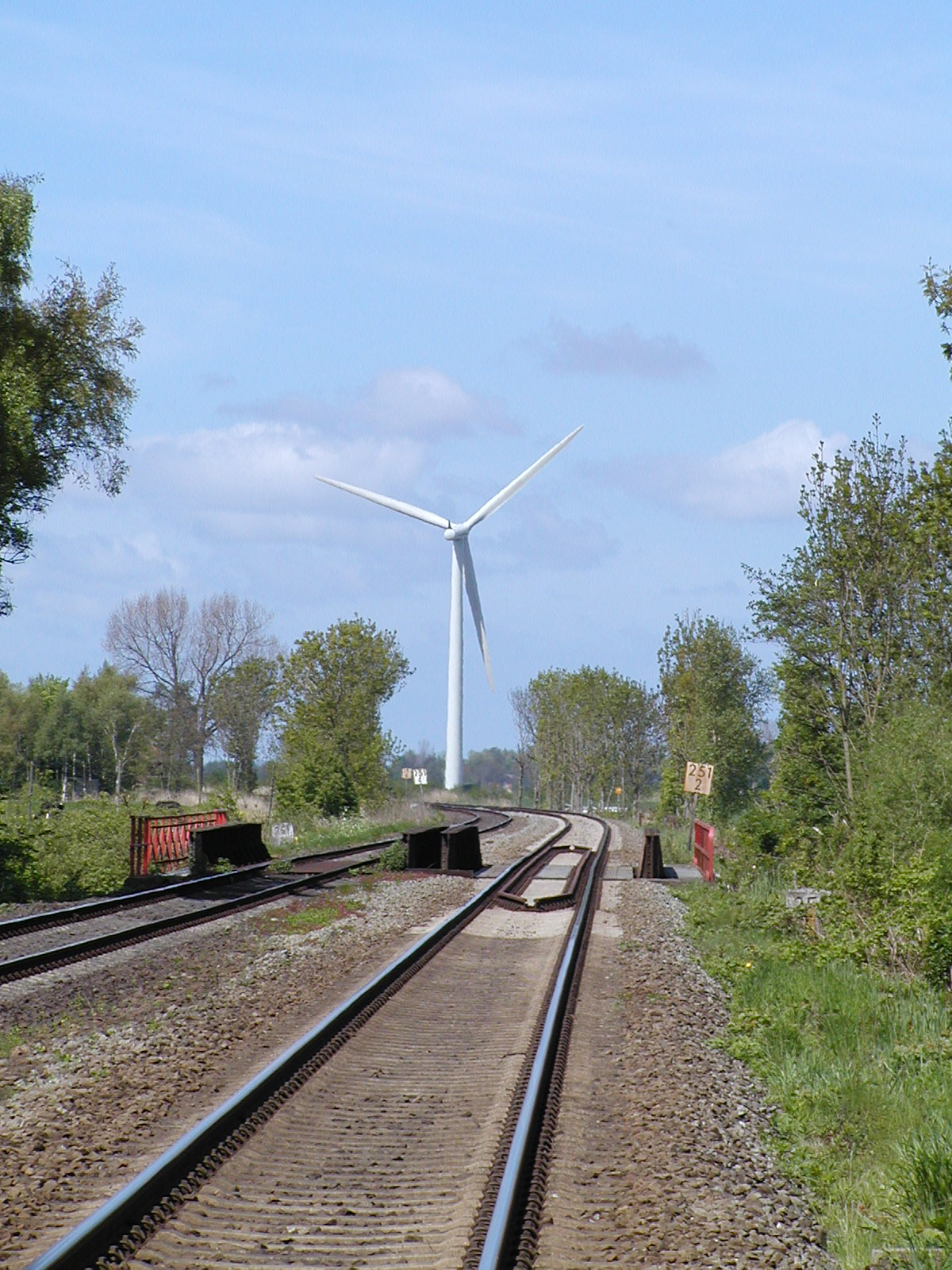
The line in Neuhaus (Oste)
