= Eisenbahnen und Verkehrsbetriebe Elbe-Weser =

German railway and bus company

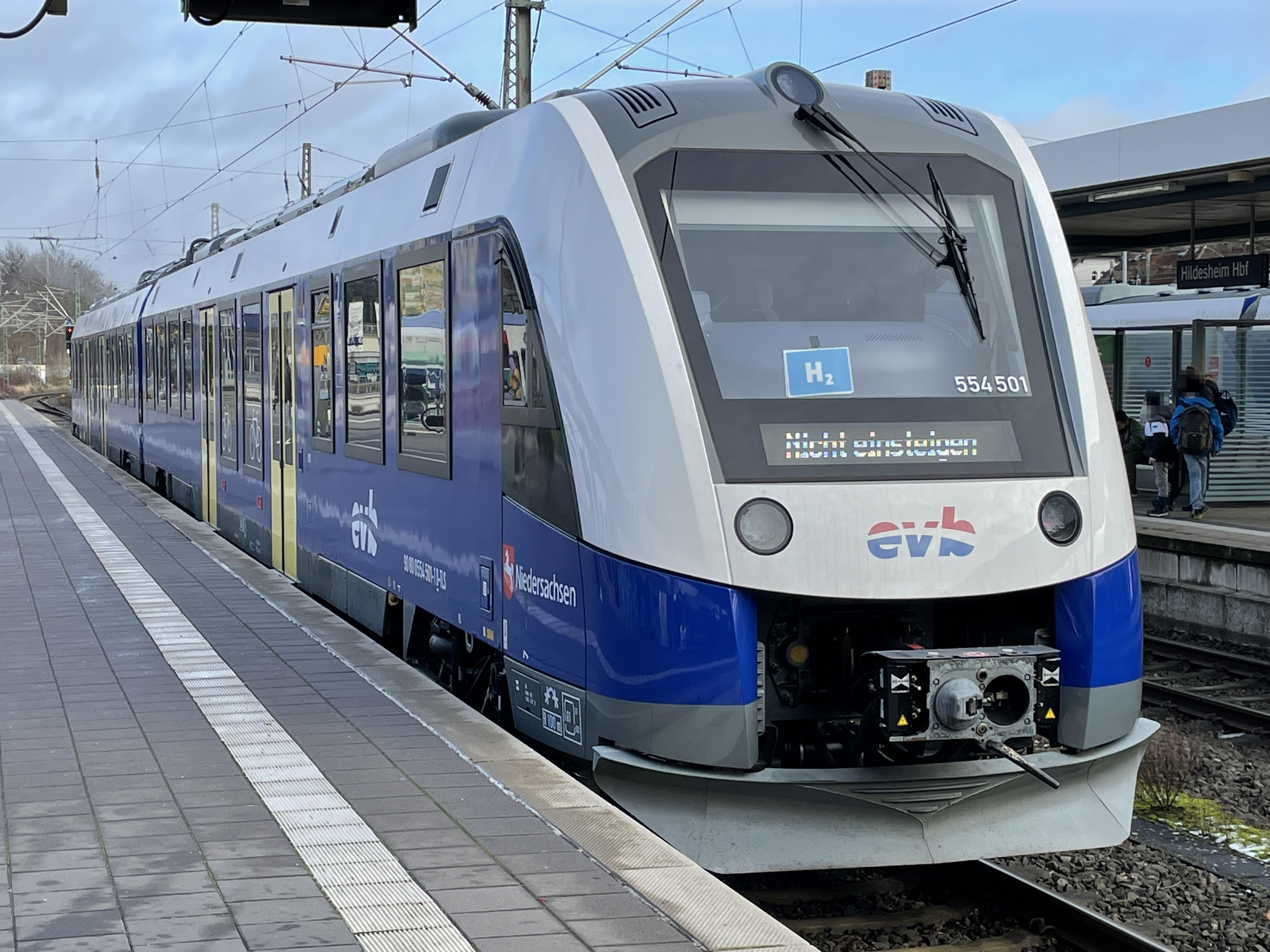
- EVB Alstom Coradia LINT at Hildesheim Hauptbahnhof in 2022

Overview
- Locale: Rotenburg, Lower Saxony
- Transit type: Regional rail; Bus
- Headquarters: Bahnhofstraße 67; 27404 Zeven

Technical
- System length: 235 km (146 mi) (rail)
- Track gauge: 1,435 mm (4 ft 8 1/2 in) standard gauge

EVB Eisenbahnen und Verkehrsbetriebe Elbe-Weser GmbH is a German railway and bus company offering passenger and freight services that is headquartered in Zeven and Bremervörde. The company was created in 1981 by the merger of the two companies Wilstedt-Zeven-Tostedter Eisenbahn GmbH (founded in 1912) and Bremervörde-Osterholzer Eisenbahn GmbH (founded in 1907).

Between 1991 and 1993, the company acquired further railway lines from the Deutsche Bundesbahn and merged with the Buxtehude-Harsefelder Eisenbahn in 1993, so that the total network length reached 285 km (177 mi).

The company offers a passenger rail service between Bremerhaven and Hamburg via Bremervörde that carries one million passengers per year. It also operates seventeen bus lines with four million passengers per year as well as freight services between Bremerhaven, Bremen and Hamburg. Using rented Siemens Dispolok locomotives, it also operates freight trains to Southern Germany. During the summer months, a heritage railway service between Bremervörde and Osterholz-Scharmbeck, called the Moorexpress, is in operation.

== Stations served ==
The current (as of 2012) EVB passenger line leads from Bremerhaven Hbf via Bremervörde to Buxtehude.

The current stations are:

- Bremerhaven Hbf (owned and operated by DB)
- Bremerhaven-Wulsdorf (DB station)
- Sellstedt
- Wehdel
- Geestenseth
- Frelsdorf
- Heinschenwalde
- Oerel
- Bremervörde (EVB depot and interchange to the Moorexpress)
- Hesedorf
- Kutenholz
- Brest-Aspe
- Bargstedt
- Harsefeld
- Ruschwedel
- Apensen
- Buxtehude (DB station, connection to Hamburg S-Bahn)

Stations beyond Buxtehude formerly served (until Dec 08, 2007):

- Neu Wulmstorf (DB station)
- Hamburg-Neugraben (DB station)
