= German railway route numbers =

Numbering system for railway routes in Germany

German railway route numbers (German:Streckennummern) are used to designate and identify railway routes, or sections of routes, within Germany. In Germany, there are a total of 3 different numbering systems used by the Deutsche Bahn, which meet different requirements.

These systems are:

1. VzG line numbers (four digit, unambiguous identification of a railway line)
2. Timetabled route numbers (three digit, Kursbuchstrecke referring to a route of passenger services)
3. Restricted speed section (La) route numbers (one to three digit)

In addition there are numbers in the railway operators' timetables; these are not covered here.

== Sources ==
- Eisenbahnatlas Deutschland, Ausgabe 2007/2008, Schweers & Wall, ISBN 978-3-89494-136-9
- Das große Archiv der Eisenbahnstrecken in Deutschland, Herausgeber Ernst Huber, Geranova
- Hans-Jürgen Geisler: DB-Streckendaten – STREDA, Eisenbahningenieur (49) 12/1998
