= Schiffdorf =

- Municipality
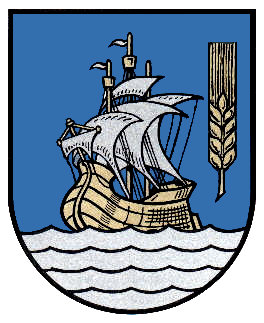
- Coat of arms

- Location of Schiffdorf within Cuxhaven district
- Interactive map of Schiffdorf
- Location within Germany Location within Lower Saxony
- Coordinates: 53°32′09″N 08°39′32″E
- Country: Germany
- State: Lower Saxony
- District: Cuxhaven

Government
  - Mayor (2021–26): Henrik Wärner (CDU)

Area
  - Total: 113.57 km^{2} (43.85 sq mi)
- Elevation: 6 m (20 ft)

Population (2025-12-31)
  - Total: 14,597
  - Density: 128.53/km^{2} (332.89/sq mi)
- Time zone: UTC+01:00 (CET)
  - Summer (DST): UTC+02:00 (CEST)
- Postal codes: 27619
- Vehicle registration: CUX
- Website: www.schiffdorf.de

Schiffdorf (German pronunciation: [ˈʃɪfdɔʁf]; Low German: Schippdörp) is a municipality in the district of Cuxhaven, in Lower Saxony, Germany. It is situated at the eastern boundary of the Bremian city of Bremerhaven, and 35 kilometers south of Cuxhaven.

== History ==
Schiffdorf belonged to the Prince-Archbishopric of Bremen (which was established as a principality of imperial immediacy in 1180). In 1380, under the reign of Prince-Archbishop Albert II, knights of the family von Mandelsloh and other Verdian and Bremian robber barons ravaged burghers of Bremen and people in the entire Prince-Archbishopric. In 1381, the city's troops successfully ended the brigandage and captured the castle of Bederkesa and pertaining bailiwicks, including Schiffdorf. In 1386, the city of Bremen made the noble family, holding the estates of Altluneburg (a part of today's Schiffdorf), its vassal.

In 1648, the Prince-Archbishopric was transformed into the Duchy of Bremen, which was first ruled in personal union by the Swedish Crown. In November 1654, after the Second Bremian War, Bremen had to cede the bailiwicks of Bederkesa and Lehe (a part of today's Bremerhaven), including Schiffdorf, to the Duchy of Bremen. After being occupied by the Danish from 1712–1715, the Duchy became a fief to the House of Hanover. In 1807, the ephemeral Kingdom of Westphalia annexed the Duchy, before France annexed it in 1810. In 1813, the Duchy was restored to the Electorate of Hanover, which, after its upgrade to the Kingdom of Hanover in 1814, incorporated the Duchy in a real union and the Ducal territory, including Schiffdorf, became part of the new Stade Region, established in 1823.
