= Buxtehude station =

Railway station in Germany

Buxtehude
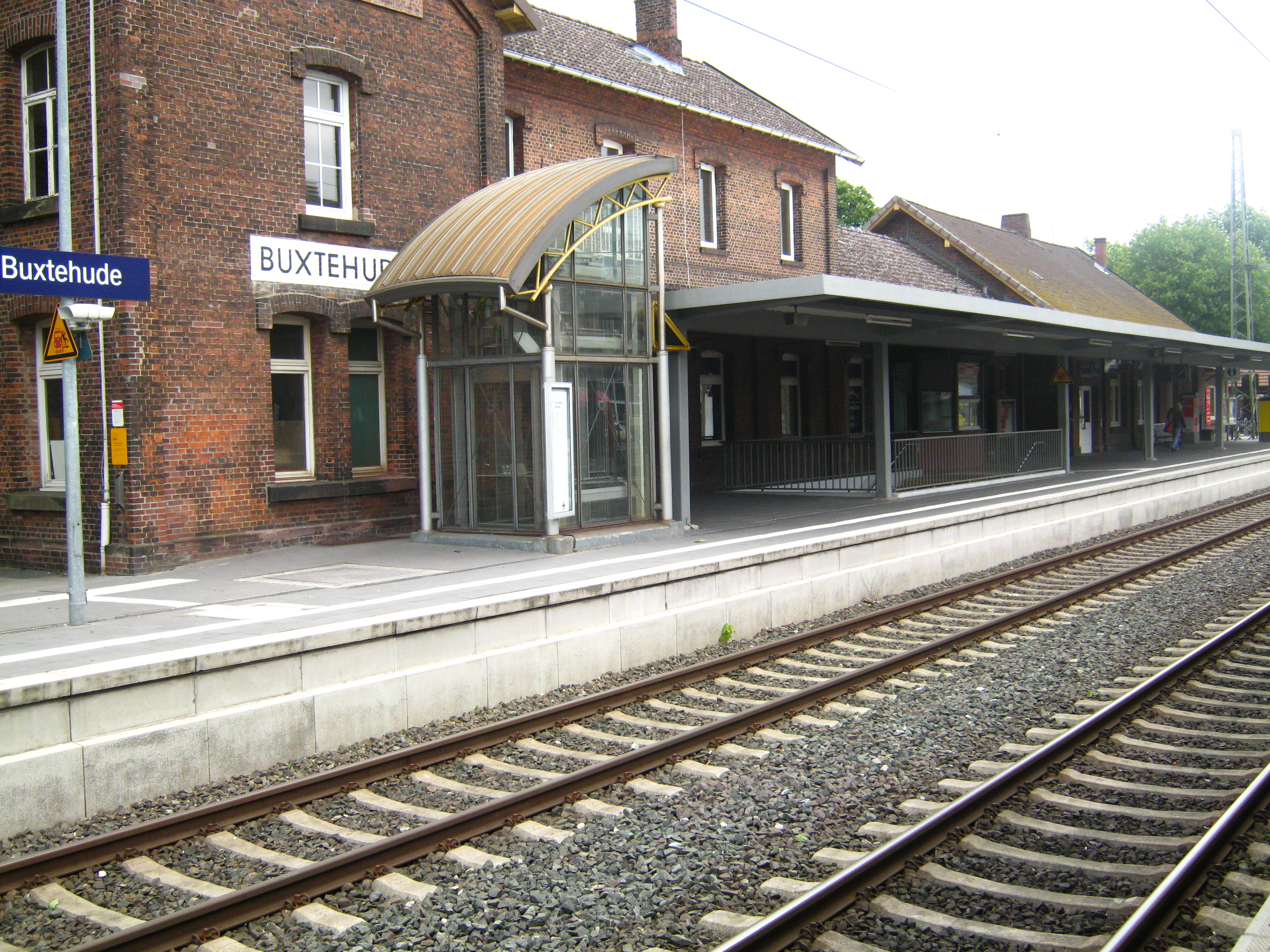

General information
- Location: Am Bundesbahnhof 1; 21614 Buxtehude, Germany
- Coordinates: 53°28′13″N 9°41′14″E
- Owner: DB Station&Service AG
- Lines: Lower Elbe Railway; Bremerhaven–Buxtehude line
- Platforms: 2 side platforms
- Tracks: 4
- Connections: Bus

Construction
- Structure type: At grade
- Parking: Park and ride
- Cycle facilities: Yes
- Accessible: Yes

Other information
- Station code: ds100: ABX; DB station code: 1015; Type: Bf Category: 3
- Fare zone: HVV: D/709
- Website: www.bahnhof.de

History
- Opened: 1881
- Rebuilt: 2008

Services
Preceding station	Start	Following station
Horneburg towards Cuxhaven	RE 5	Hamburg-Harburg towards Hamburg Hbf
Preceding station	EVB	Following station
Apensen towards Cuxhaven	RB 33	Terminus
Preceding station	Hamburg S-Bahn	Following station
Neukloster towards Stade	S5	Neu Wulmstorf towards Elbgaustraße
Location
- Location within Lower Saxony Location within Germany Location within Europe

Buxtehude is a railway station in northwestern Germany. The station is located in the town of Buxtehude. It is located on two railway lines: the Lower Elbe Railway, which runs between Cuxhaven and Hamburg, and the Bremerhaven–Buxtehude line of the Eisenbahnen und Verkehrsbetriebe Elbe-Weser (EVB) to Bremervörde (and therefore, to Bremerhaven and Zeven).

== Train services ==
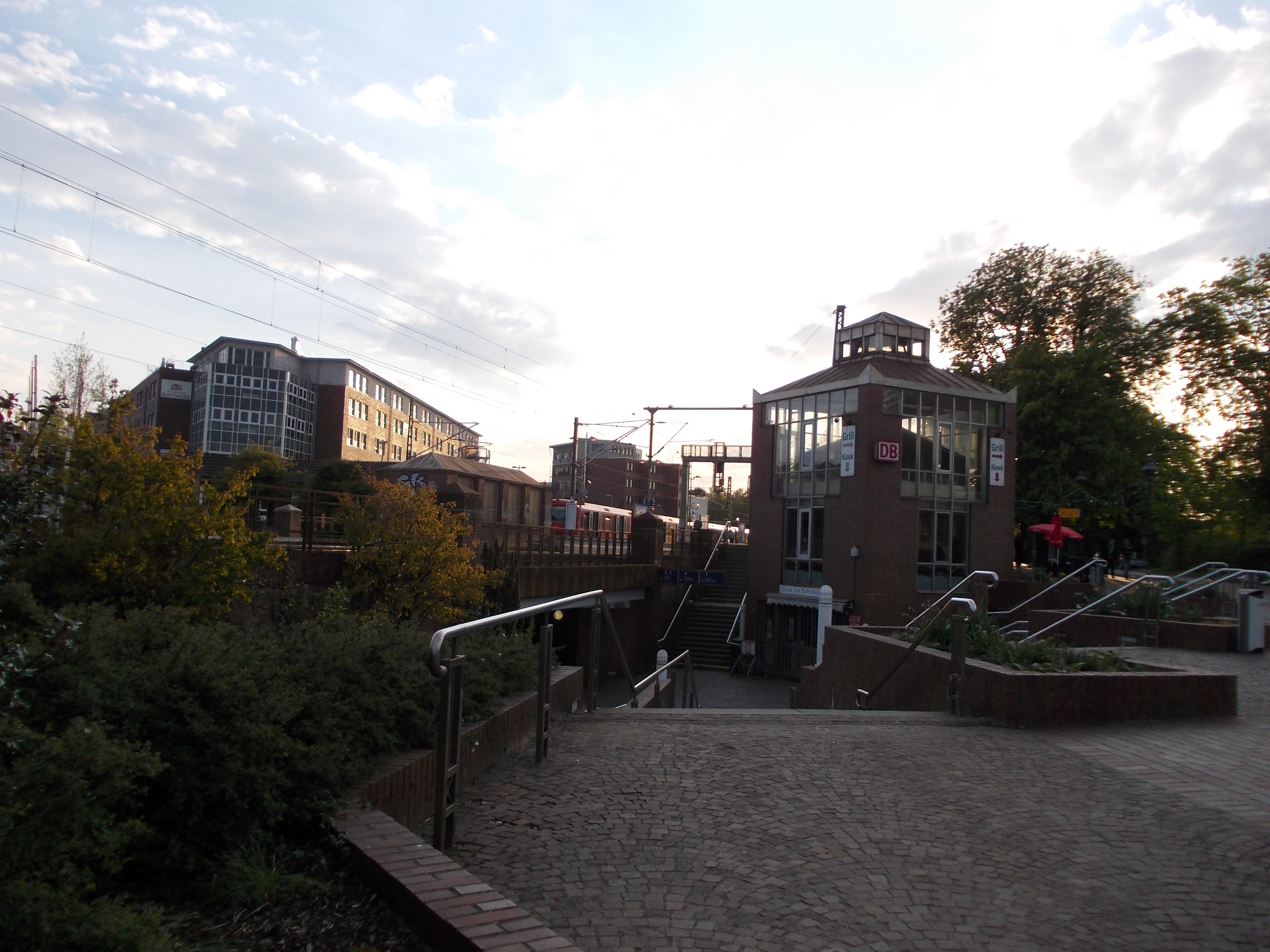
Underpass to the station

Regular commuter trains from Stade and regional trains from Cuxhaven to Hamburg call at the station. The Bremerhaven to Buxtehude service, which is operated by EVB, has terminated at Buxtehude since late 2007. On the same date, the Cuxhaven to Hamburg service became a Metronom service.

The station is served by trains of the Hamburg S-Bahn line S5.

The station is served by the following services:

- Regional services RE 5 Cuxhaven - Otterndorf - Stade - Buxtehude - Hamburg
- Local services RB 33 Cuxhaven - Bremerhaven - Bremervörde - Buxtehude
- Hamburg S-Bahn services S 5 Stade - Buxtehude - Hamburg - Elbgaustraße

== See also ==
- List of Hamburg S-Bahn stations
