= Cuxhaven station =

Railway station in Lower Saxony, Germany

Coordinates: 53.8610°N 8.7032°E

Cuxhaven
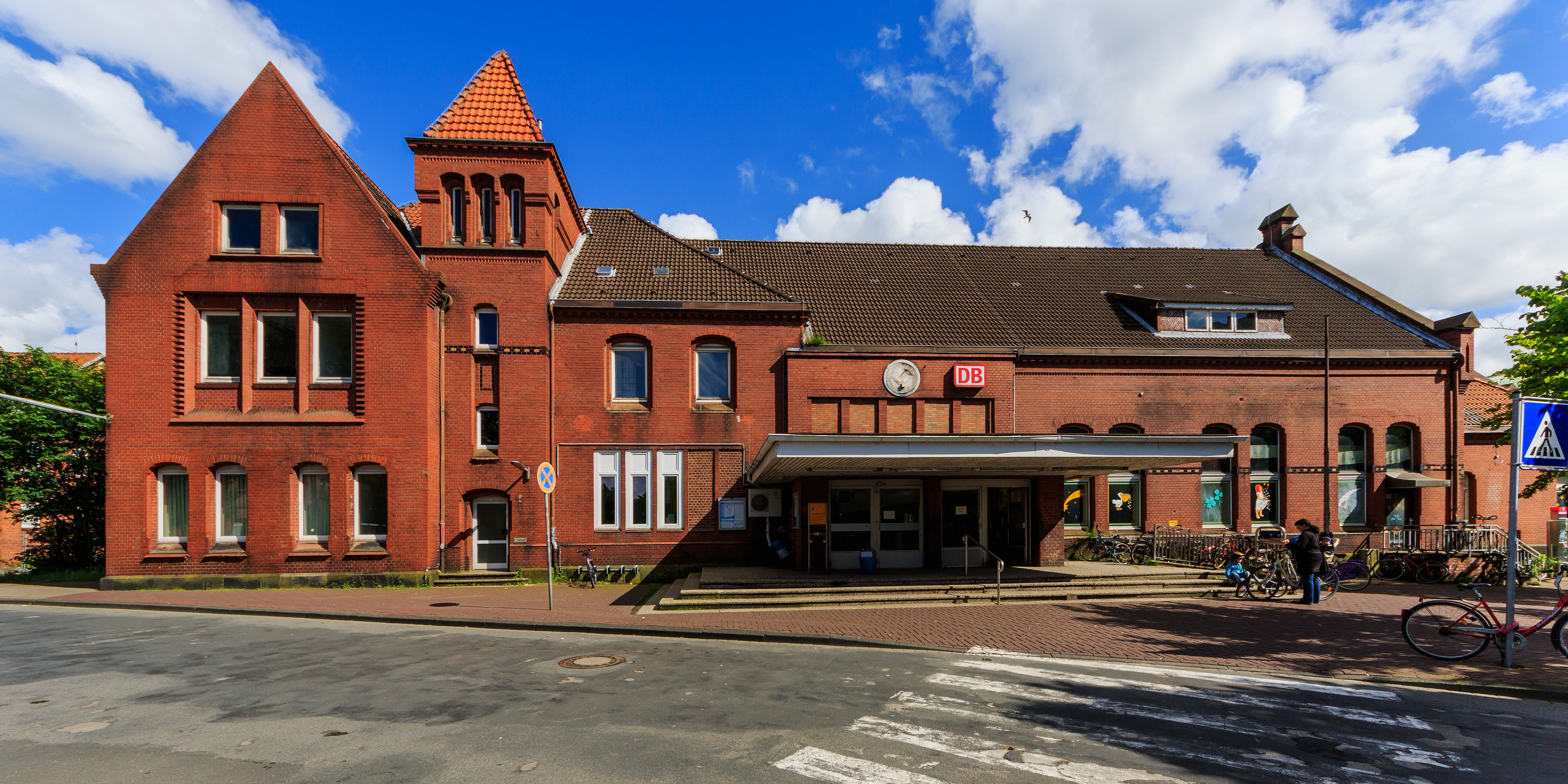
- Cuxhaven railway station

General information
- Location: Cuxhaven, Lower Saxony; Germany
- Owner: Deutsche Bahn
- Operator: DB Station&Service
- Lines: Lower Elbe Railway; Bremerhaven–Cuxhaven railway
- Connections: RE 5; RB 33

Other information
- Station code: 1095
- DS100 code: ACV
- IBNR: 01352
- Category: 5
- Fare zone: VNN: Cuxhaven 1/1100 (buses only); HVV: H/1219 (VNN transitional tariff, season tickets only)
- Website: www.bahnhof.de

History
- Opened: 11 November 1881; 144 years ago

Key dates
- 1 June 1898; 128 years ago: current station building inaugurated

Services
Preceding station	Start	Following station
Terminus	RE 5	Otterndorf towards Hamburg Hbf
Preceding station	EVB	Following station
Terminus	RB 33	Nordholz towards Buxtehude
Location
- Location within Lower Saxony Location within Germany Location within Europe

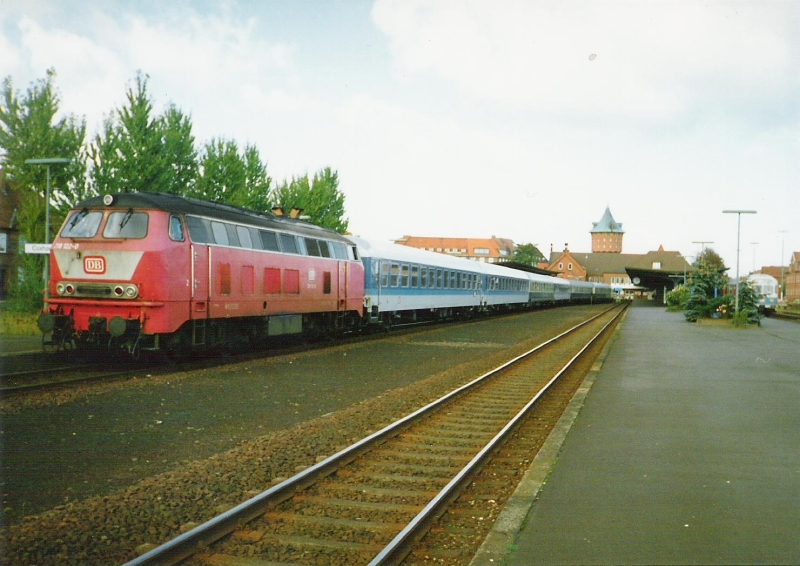
Long-Distance-Train in Cuxhaven, about 1993

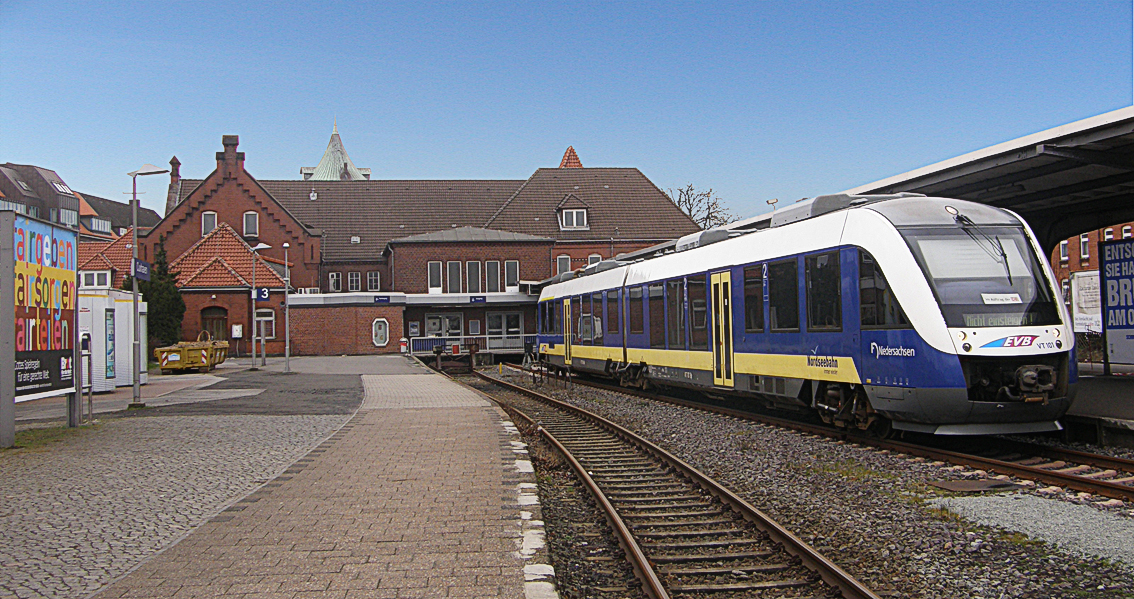
An EVB Train

Cuxhaven (German: Bahnhof Cuxhaven) is a railway station located in Cuxhaven, Germany. The station is located on the Lower Elbe Railway and Bremerhaven–Cuxhaven railway and terminus for both lines. The Cuxhaven-Bremerhaven service is operated by EVB. The Cuxhaven to Hamburg service, which was operated by Deutsche Bahn, became a Metronom service at the end of 2007. In December 2018, Start Unterelbe GmbH, a subsidiary of Deutsche Bahn, took over the service. Today the station building is owned by a cooperative.

== Train services ==
The following trains currently call at the station:

- Regional trains RE 5 Cuxhaven - Stade - Buxtehude - Hamburg
- Local trains RB 33 Cuxhaven - Dorum - Bremerhaven - Bremervörde - Buxtehude

== See also ==
- Rail transport in Germany
- Railway stations in Germany
