= Railway station types in Germany =

Any feature on a railway where an operation can take place

The railways in Germany use several abbreviations to differentiate between various types of stations, stops, railway facilities and other places of rail service.

== Places with a set of points ==
- Bf – Bahnhof (railway station), defined as a place where trains may start, terminate, stop, overtake, meet or change directions, and that has at least one set of points. It can be additionally named after its purpose:
  - Hbf – Hauptbahnhof, the main or central station of a town or city. Also the only abbreviation commonly found on station timetables and signs.
  - Pbf – Personenbahnhof (passenger station), usually used to differentiate in places that have several types of stations, but only one passenger station.
  - Fbf – Fernbahnhof (long distance station)
  - Gbf – Güterbahnhof (freight station)
  - Bbf – Betriebsbahnhof, a station only for operational tasks like train overtakes.
  - Rbf – Rangierbahnhof (marshalling yard)
  - Ubf – Umschlagbahnhof (transshipment station)
  - Werkbf – Werkbahnhof, a station serving a factory or plant.
  - Postbf – Postbahnhof (mail station)
- Bft – Bahnhofsteil (part of a station), used when a station consists of distinct facilities, for example a Pbf and a Gbf.
- Abzw – Abzweigstelle (a junction without platforms)
- Üst – Überleitstelle (crossover)
- Anst – Anschlussstelle (industrial siding outside station limits), trains using the Anschlussstelle must not be passed by trains running on the main line.
- Awanst – Ausweichanschlussstelle (refuge siding), an industrial siding outside station limits where trains can run on the main line while another train is shunting at the Ausweichanschlussstelle, in contrast to an Anschlussstelle.
- Hst – Haltestelle, the term for a Haltepunkt (see below) at the same location as an Abzweigstelle, Überleitstelle or Anschlussstelle/Ausweichanschlussstelle.
- Ldst – Ladestelle, a simplified freight station used to transship goods, nowadays mostly part of a station or categorized as Awanst.

== Places without a set of points ==
- Hp – Haltepunkt (halt), a passenger stop that does not fit the requirements to be a Bahnhof. Defined as a place where trains can stop, start or terminate, but which has no sets of points in the vicinity.
- Bk – Blockstelle (block post), a signal box outside station limits, where there is a long distance between stations and/or junctions/crossovers, with just one signal in each direction, to allow more trains following each other (only called Bk if it is staffed, otherwise it is called Sbk – selbsttätige Blockstelle (automatic block post)).
- Dkst – Deckungsstelle, a signal box outside station limits which protects rail operation at danger spots like moveable bridges with its signals.

== Other railway facilities ==
- Bush – Bushaltestelle (bus stop)
- Est – Einsatzstelle (office of the staff, locomotive depot; old/colloquial abbreviation: Bw for Bahnbetriebswerk)
- BZ – Betriebszentrale/ESTW (head office of computer-based interlocking)
- Gp – Grenzpunkt, border to another railway infrastructure manager (domestic and foreign).
- LGr – Landesgrenze, border between German federated states.
- Schstr – Schutzstrecke, neutral section in an overhead line to separate two electrical supplies.
- Slst – Schiffslandestelle (ship dock)
- Strw – Streckenwechsel, change of VzG line.
- Tank – Tankanlagen (filling stations)
- Uw – Unterwerk (traction substation)
- Werk – Werk (repair shop; old/colloquial abbreviation: Aw or Raw for Ausbesserungswerk)

== Classification of railway facilities ==
Railway facilities in Germany are divided into three categories:

- Bahnanlagen der Bahnhöfe (railway facilities of the stations): e.g. station buildings, platforms, loading docks, signal boxes, goods sheds
- Bahnanlagen der freien Strecke (railway facilities outside station limits): Abzw, Anst, Awanst, Bk, Dkst, Hp, Hst, Üst
- Sonstige Bahnanlagen (other railway facilities): e.g. electrical substations, depots, repair shops

== See also ==
- List of Deutsche Bahn station codes
- German railway station categories
