= List of Deutsche Bahn station codes =

Deutsche Bahn and its predecessors Deutsche Bundesbahn, Deutsche Reichsbahn and Deutsche Reichsbahn-Gesellschaft use a system of letters to denote a station on their network. The station code used today is colloquially called the DS 100 code, named after the original papers of the Deutsche Bundesbahn laying out the system, the DS 100, Abkürzungen der Betriebsstellen; nowadays called Richtlinie (Ril) 100, Abkürzungen für Örtlichkeiten. Every code specifies abbreviation, name and type of the station.

== Description of the code ==
The code is set up as follows:

- X YYYY Z

where X denotes the Bundesbahndirektion (BD) in West Germany or Reichsbahndirektion (Rbd) in East Germany and prior to 1949, and YYYY is the code of the station itself, which can be up to four letters. Together with the Direktionen letter (X or Z) the first letter is also the country code for foreign destinations (see below). Although some of the Direktionen have been merged into others, changed, or otherwise remodeled, their old codes remained in place. For example, most of the Northern areas of Germany still have the BD code A for Altona (now a part of Hamburg), even though the BD Altona has long been out of existence. Further information can be added by an extra letter Z after the station identifier, for example HB is the code for Bremen Hauptbahnhof, (BD Hanover (H), station code B) whilst HB X is the code for the Bremen maintenance works, which are considered a subdivision of Bremen Hauptbahnhof and hence do not have their own code. Special codes are also used to identify border points, special tariff points for ships et cetera.

== Listing of BD/Rbd codes ==
- A – Altona (Hamburg)
- B – Berlin
- D – Dresden
- E – Essen
- F – Frankfurt
- H – Hanover
- K – Cologne
- L – Halle (Saale)
- M – Munich
- N – Nuremberg
- R – Karlsruhe
- S – Saarbrücken
- T – Stuttgart
- U – Erfurt
- W – Schwerin
- X – see #Country codes (X)
- Z – see #Country codes (Z)

Letters C, G, I, J, O, P, Q, V and Y are assigned for facilities of DB Energie (e.g. filling stations) and DB Netz (e.g. changes of VzG lines) or other foreign locations for planning purposes.

=== Country codes (X) ===
These codes were assigned to international destinations west of Germany, but are used for eastern European destinations too.

- XA – Austria
- XB – Belgium
- XC – Russia
- XD – Denmark
- XE – Spain
- XF – France
- XG – Greece
- XH – Finland
- XI – Italy
- XJ – Serbia
- XK – United Kingdom
- XL – Luxembourg
- XM – Hungary
- XN – Netherlands
- XO – Norway
- XP – Poland
- XQ – Turkey
- XR – Croatia
- XS – Switzerland
- XT – Czech Republic
- XU – Romania
- XV – Sweden
- XW – Bulgaria
- XX – Portugal
- XY – Slovakia
- XZ – Slovenia

=== Country codes (Z) ===
These codes were assigned for international destinations east of Germany.

- ZA – Macedonia
- ZB – Bosnia and Herzegovina
- ZE – Estonia
- ZI – Ireland
- ZK – Kazakhstan
- ZL – Lithuania
- ZM – Moldova
- ZT – Latvia
- ZU – Ukraine
- ZW – Belarus

== List of station codes ==
- Please refer Deutsche Bahn AG: Übersicht der Betriebsstellen und deren Abkürzungen (XLSX, 24,7 MB, status: May 2026)

== See also ==
- Railway divisions in Germany
- Railway station types in Germany
