= Göttingen–Bodenfelde railway =

Railway line in Germany

Overview
- Line number: 1801
- Locale: Hesse and Lower Saxony, Germany

Service
- Route number: 356 Süd; until 1992: 245; until ?: 246; until 1970: 202d, ex 200c

Technical
- Line length: 36.780 km (22.854 mi)
- Minimum radius: 500 m (1,640 ft)
- Operating speed: 80 km/h (49.7 mph) (maximum)
- Maximum incline: 0.092%

The Göttingen–Bodenfelde railway, also called the Oberweserbahn (Upper Weser Railway) and in Göttingen the Bodenfelder Bahn (Bodenfeld Railway), is a standard gauge railway in South Lower Saxony. The single-track, non-electrified branch line runs from Göttingen to Bodenfelde through the Weser Uplands. It is used mainly by local traffic, but it is also used by through traffic. The route was once used, for example, by Düsseldorf–Göttingen traffic.

The only freight is from a basalt quarry in Adelebsen.

== Route ==
The route runs approximately from the southeast to the northwest, with important intermediate stations at Lenglern and Adelebsen.

It now branches about 3 kilometres north of Göttingen station at the former Weende station from the Hanoverian Southern Railway (part of the old North–South railway). Until the construction of the Hanover–Würzburg high-speed railway, it had its own track to Göttingen station. It successively crosses the high-speed railway, federal highway 3 and the Leine. On the western edge of the Leine valley it passes under Autobahn 7 and rises briefly to Lödingsen. Between Emmenhausen and Offensen it runs through the Münden Nature Park. From Adelebsen to Bodenfelde the line follows the Schwülme river to the Weser river. This section is sometimes referred to as the Schwülmetalbahn (Schwülme Valley Railway). Vernawahlshausen station is located in the state of Hesse. From there it runs parallel to the Solling Railway, which it joins at Bodenfelde station.

== History ==
During the planning of the Hanover–Hann. Münden–Kassel railway (opened from Hanover to Göttingen in 1854 and to Hann. Münden in 1856) options to the west of the town were discussed. In the mid-1860s, a connection between Göttingen and the Frederick William Northern Railway (Friedrich-Wilhelms-Nordbahn) at Bad Karlshafen via Adelebsen was discussed. This was demanded repeatedly especially in Adelebsen as its quarries had already become important. This line would have been useful for long-distance traffic, as the Halle–Kassel railway was extended via Arenshausen to Göttingen in 1867, but an extension to Kassel was very controversial. Nevertheless, the Arenshausen–Münden link (connecting to Kassel) was completed in 1872. The Solling Railway via Uslar and Hardegsen was opened further north in 1878. This meant that east-west traffic skirted Göttingen and Adelebsen. The construction of another mainline railway in the same general direction was not expected. Demands and discussions followed for three decades. Among other things, the western extension of the narrow-gauge Garte Valley Railway (Gartetalbahn, connecting Duderstadt and Göttingen) via Adelebsen and Uslar to Schönhagen was planned from 1897 (the last section of this route was similar to the later Uslar–Schönhagen (Han) railway.

From about 1901, the Prussian state railways became interested in this region. On 25 June 1904, the Prussian parliament approved a package of several secondary and light railways, including one from Göttingen to Bodenfelde. In 1906 the route was surveyed and construction began in the spring of 1908. It was briefly interrupted by a flood on the line, but the terrain was unproblematic. The branch line with a maximum slope of 1:109 was less steep than the adjacent Solling Railway and the Dransfeld ramp of the Hanoverian Southern Railway. The Göttingen–Bodenfelde railway was opened on 15 August 1910.

=== Operation until 1945 ===
The branch line was one of the most profitable in the country in the 1920s. 2,000 tonnes were loaded daily from three basalt quarries in Adelebsen. In addition, through traffic developed. The stations in Lenglern, Adelebsen and Verliehausen were upgraded from 1926 to 1928.

During the Second World War, a munitions plant was connected to the line near Lenglern. During fighting in April 1945, this line, among other things, was also damaged by the bombardment of an ammunition train. Supposedly damage in Emmenhausen arose when the U.S. troops participated in the making of a film about the war and they set alight wagons carrying ammunition. The railway was restored to operation in mid-June.

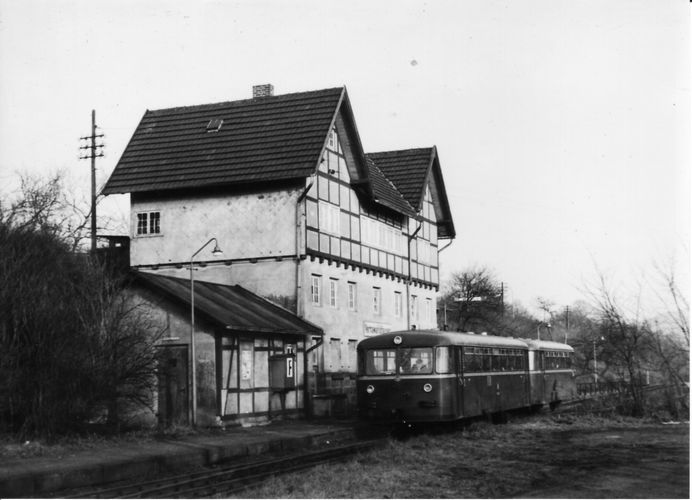
An Uerdingen railbus on the Göttingen side of Vernawahlshausen station in about 1970. Behind (higher) is the Solling Railway

=== 1950s to the 1980s ===
In the 1950s and early 1960s, traffic increased again, but did not reach the level of the pre-war period. The basalt quarry in Adelebsen was reopened and today it is the only quarry in operation. In contrast, a sawmill closed. From the mid-1960s passenger numbers declined. Eberhausen station was closed In 1973, Weende followed in 1976 and Lenglern, Emmenhausen and Verliehausen in 1988. Since 1976, only the services from Göttingen route have stopped in Vernawahlshausen (see picture), those on the Solling Railway have since run through without stopping at the former junction station, the station building was demolished in the same year. Deutsche Bundesbahn several times favoured decommissioning the line in the medium-term or using the line only for long distance traffic between the Ruhr and Göttingen. Neither of these options have been implemented to date.

Until the opening of the new Egge Tunnel on the line between Kassel and Paderborn, many trains between Kassel and the Ruhr region were diverted via Adelebsen if the direct route through the Egge range was blocked by landslides, as in 1988.

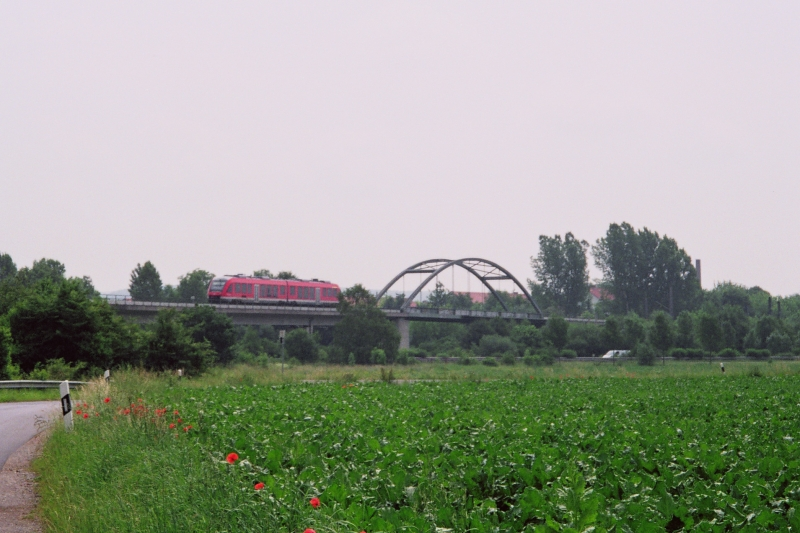
During the construction of the Hannover–Würzburg high-speed line a long bridge was built for the railway line to Bodenfelde, which later also crossed Federal highway 3.

For the construction of the Hanover–Würzburg high-speed railway, the former access route to Göttingen station was demolished. The traffic of the branch line was first diverted from Weende temporarily via the new line until the former railway embankment was extended by a bridge over the high-speed line and the new Federal highway 3 and connected to the railway at the former Weende station to the Hanover–Kassel railway. Thus, the trains to Bodenfelde were the first to run on the new line in Göttingen.

=== Today ===
In December 2005, after prolonged pressure on Deutsche Bahn and the Lower Saxony state transport company (Landesnahverkehrsgesellschaft Niedersachsen), they reopened the station in Lenglern, which had been closed in 1988. The line, which was still working with mechanical signalboxes in Adelebsen and Bodenfelde, has been controlled by an electronic interlocking in Göttingen since October 2008. The maximum speed on most of the line remains 60 km/h for the time being, contrary to the original announcements. While two level crossings were made technically secure with half barriers in Erbsen and Lödingsen in October/November 2013, the technical backup at some other level crossings is still unclear. The lack of several engineering backup systems have led to speed restrictions. Since late 2009, the section between Offensen (25.6 kilometres) and Bodenfelde can be run at 80 km/h. There is no wheelchair access to trains in Lenglern and Adelebsen. Trains can only be reached by stairs in Bodenfelde. Maps and directions to buses or taxis for the onward journey are missing at the halts at Leglern, Lödingsen, Offensen (Kr. Northeim) and Vernawahlshausen.

== Operations ==
Since 15 December 2013, services on the line have been by operated by NordWestBahn GmbH. This has run at weekdays at hourly intervals. This represented an intensification of operations as the previous operator DB Regio had operated a two-hour regular interval service with additional Regionalbahn services for students since December 2007. Due to the lack of crossing facilities (which was only possible in Adelebsen), the journey time between Bodenfelde and Göttingen was lengthened by about six to eight minutes with the reintroduction of hourly services and now amounts to around 50 minutes.

The trains continue from Bodenfelde on the Solling Railway to Ottbergen, where there are good connections both towards Paderborn and towards Höxter, Holzminden and Kreiensen. The NordWestBahn operates three-part Bombardier Talent diesel railcars. DB Regio operated two-part LINT railcars until 14 December 2013. Until 2005, most DB services were operated with class 614 and 628 diesel multiple units.

A Paderborn–Kreiensen/Göttingen service was established with sections uncoupling in Ottbergen (thus offering a transfer-free connection between Paderborn and Göttingen) at the timetable change in December 2015 (RB 84/RB 85).

In 1910, there were five pairs of passenger trains with a travel time of 82 minutes, in 1937 there were ten pairs, in the 1950s there were 13 to 16 pairs, including several long-distance express trains that stopped only in Adelebsen. Until 1989, an Eilzug (semi-fast) service ran between the Ruhr and Göttingen, which was upgraded to an express (D-Züge) in 1983. The carriages ran to Bodenfelde as through coaches in the last few years.
