= International Federation of Tobacco Workers =

The International Federation of Tobacco Workers (IFTW) was a global union federation bringing together unions representing workers involved in growing, processing or selling tobacco.

== History ==
The idea of an international federation of tobacco workers arose in the 1880s in the Belgian and Dutch unions, which tried to interest the German Tobacco Workers' Union in participating. In 1889, a conference was held in Antwerp between the unions, and in 1890, the federation was launched. It was based in Antwerp until 1910, then in Bremen, but became moribund during World War I. It was refounded in 1918, and the headquarters were moved to Amsterdam. By 1925, the federation had 25 affiliates, with a total of 118,000 members. This then fell, and by 1935, it had only 42,000 members, in Belgium, Czechoslovakia, Denmark, France, the Netherlands, Norway, Sweden, Switzerland, and the UK.

In 1958, the federation merged into the International Union of Food and Drinks Workers' Associations, which renamed itself as the "International Union of Food, Drinks and Tobacco Workers' Associations", although some of its affiliates preferred instead to join the new Plantation Workers International Federation.

== Affiliates ==
In 1954, the following unions were affiliated to the federation:

Union	Country	Affiliated membership
Danish Tobacco Workers' Union	Denmark	8,942
Federation of Tobacco and Matches	France	6,000
General Dutch Industrial Union of the Tobacco Industry	Netherlands	3,000
National Federation of State Monopoly Workers	Italy	Unknown
Norwegian Tobacco Workers' Union	Norway	1,296
Pan Hellic Federation of Tobacco Workers	Greece	Unknown
Swedish Tobacco Industry Workers' Union	Sweden	1,766
Tobacco Workers' Union	Belgium	3,809
Tobacco Workers' Union	United Kingdom	20,750

== Leadership ==
=== General Secretaries ===
1890: J. Vendelmans
1892: Henri Jugters
1910: Karl Deichmann
1919: Harry Eichelsheim
1931: Ferdinand Husung
1933: Edmund Olsen
1938: Dirk Nak
1952: Alfons van Uytven

=== Presidents ===
1919: Christian Jensen
1934: V. Novack
1945: Marcelle Delabit
