= Solling Railway =

Railway in Germany

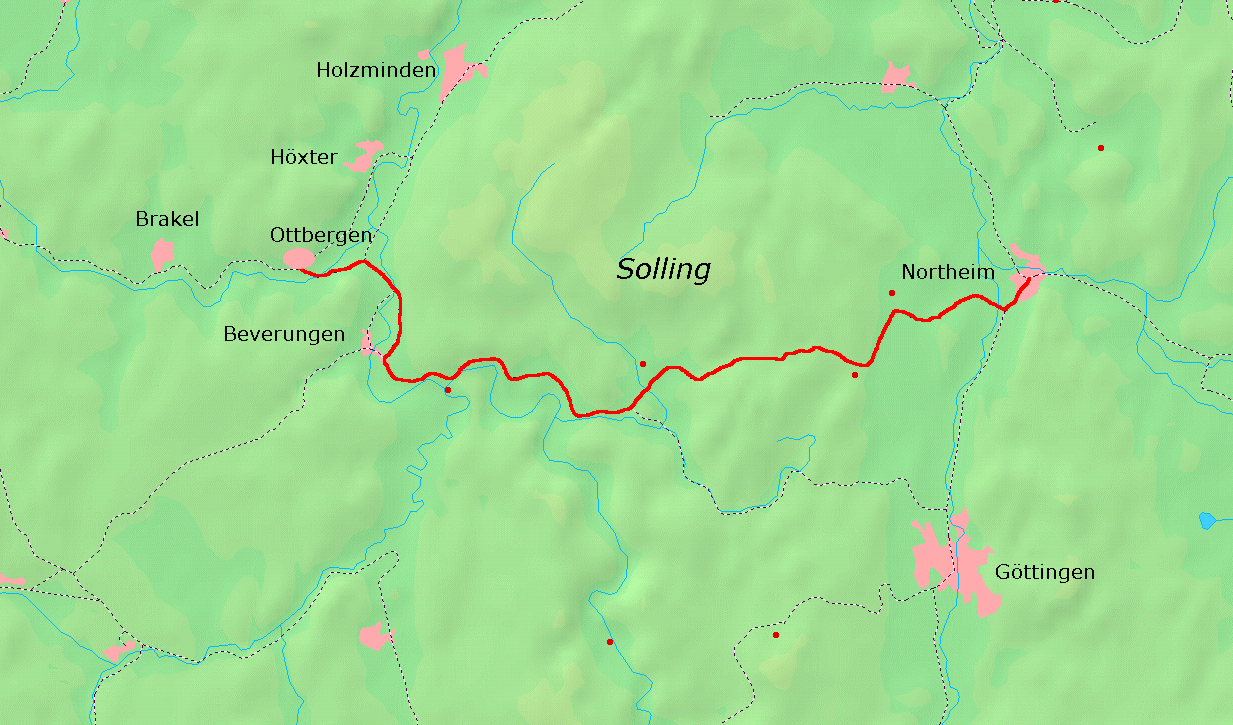

Overview
- Native name: Sollingbahn
- Line number: 2975
- Locale: Lower Saxony, North Rhine-Westphalia and Hesse, Germany
- Termini: Höxter-Ottbergen; Northeim

Service
- Route number: 356 north

Technical
- Line length: 63.95 km (39.74 mi)
- Track gauge: 1,435 mm (4 ft 8 1/2 in) standard gauge
- Electrification: 15 kV/16.7 Hz AC; Overhead catenary

The Solling Railway (German: Sollingbahn is a non-electrified, single track standard gauge railway connecting Höxter-Ottbergen in the east of the German state of North Rhine-Westphalia and Northeim in southern Lower Saxony. It takes its name from the fact that it runs through the southern Solling in Lower Saxony, an area of large forests and low mountains (Mittelgebirge).

It is listed as timetable (KBS) route 356 north (until 1992 it was KBS 245, and until 1970 it was KBS 200).

== Route ==
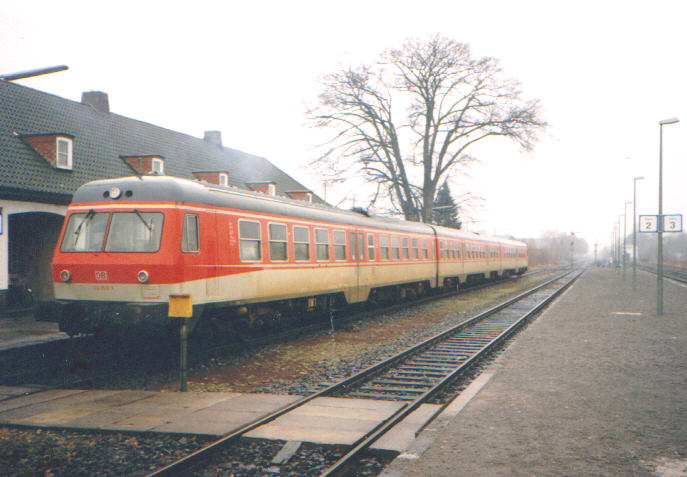
Class 614 in Höxter-Ottbergen

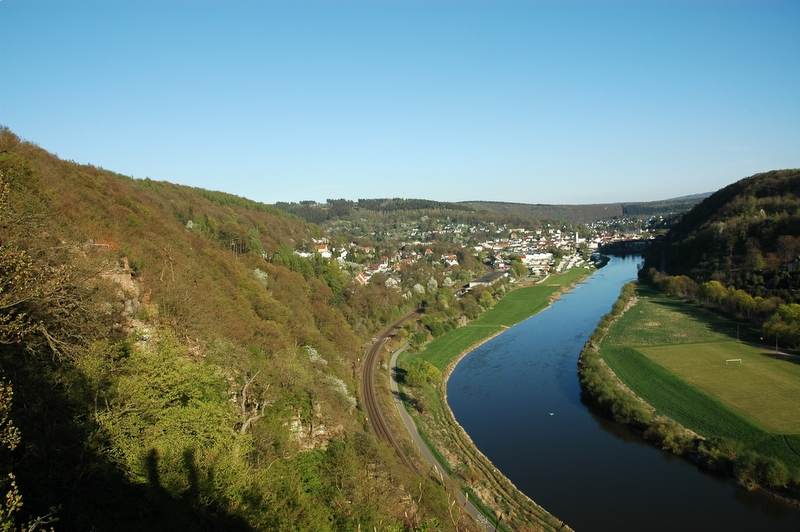
Section near Bad Karlshafen

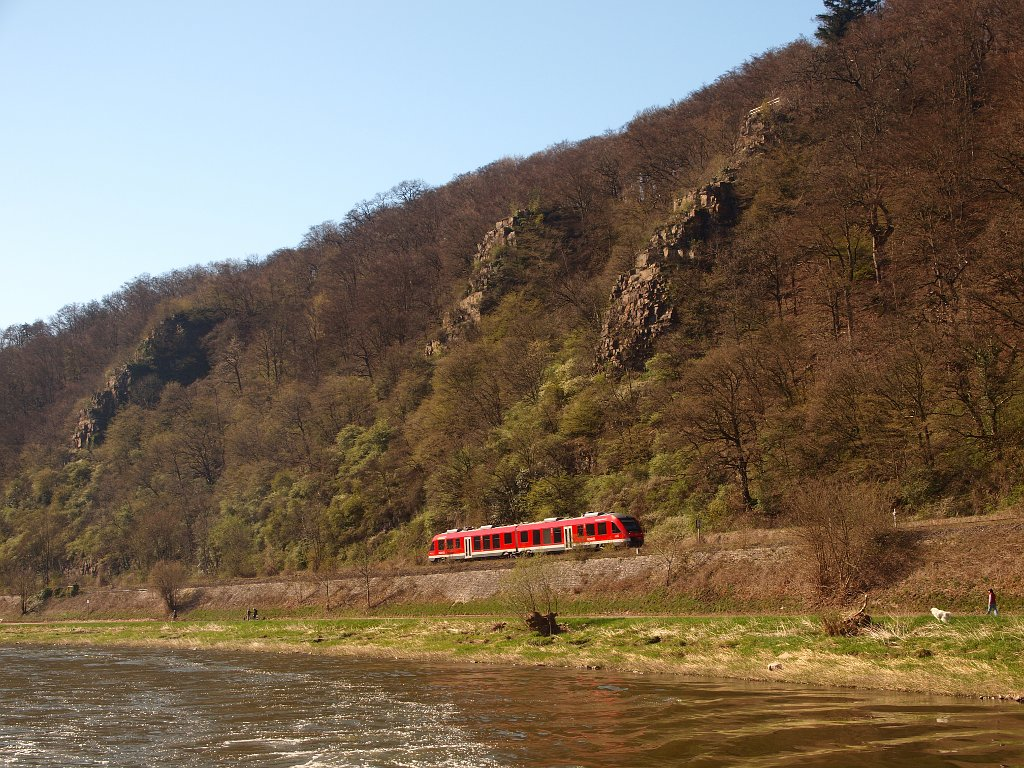
Solling Railway below the Hanover Cliffs

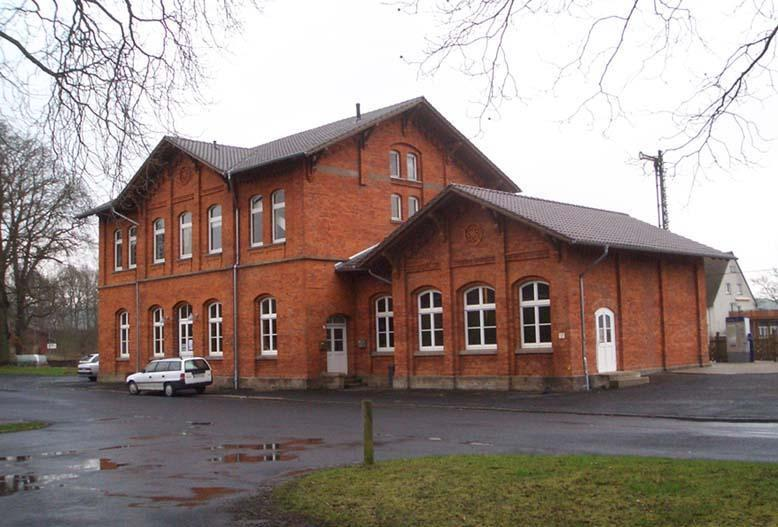
Uslar station is now a cultural centre

The line begins in the North Rhine-Westphalian district of Höxter, near Ottbergen and runs on a high embankment including a bridge over the Nethe to Amelunxen. It runs through a deep cutting to Wehrden station and then crosses the Weser river on a steel bridge and enters Lower Saxony and the district of Holzminden. The line follows the Weser upstream, passing through Lauenförde-Beverungen station and at Würgassen returns to the district of Höxter. After Würgassen it runs on a picturesque route between the Weser and the "Hanover cliffs" to the North Rhine-Westphalia–Hesse state border on the eastern outskirts of Bad Karlshafen, the northernmost city in the state, which is in the Kassel district, and on to Bad Karlshafen. Shortly after Bad Karlshafen the line runs through the Lower Saxony district of Northeim. The Wahmbeck tunnel cuts through a loop of the Weser.

After Bodenfelde station the line finally leaves the Weser valley and then runs through the Schwülme valley. Just after Bodenfelde station, the Solling Railway and the Göttingen–Bodenfelde line separate and run parallel to Vernawahlshausen station, crossing the Hesse/Lower Saxony border three times (twice while crossing the Schwülme). Until 1976 it was possible to change between the lines in Vernawahlshausen, but now only trains on the line to/from Göttingen stop there. From there the line runs until the end of the line in the district of Northeim. In Gut Steimke, before Uslar, it crosses the Ahle river on a high viaduct. From Uslar-Allershausen until after Uslar-Bollensen the line again runs on a high embankment. The Solling line climbs along the southern slope of the Rehbach valley through Uslar and Volpriehausen stations to Ertinghäusen (Bollert) tunnel, the highest point of the track (259 m above sea level), with gradients of up to 1.14%, and then runs down the Leine valley passing through Hardegsen on a gradient of up to 1.27%. In Hardegsen it passes through another deep cutting. After Berwartshausen the Solling line crosses the A 7 autobahn, running between Hanover and Kassel. Before Northeim it runs on an embankment and crosses the Leine river, the Hanover–Würzburg high-speed line and the North–South railway (Hanoverian Southern Railway). In Northeim, it ends at the 63.951 km mark.

=== Former branches ===
The former Holzminden–Scherfede mainline railway (which had been built by the Bergisch-Märkische Railway Company to connect the Upper Ruhr Valley Railway and the Altenbeken–Kreiensen railway) was crossed in Wehrden. Both lines ran parallel through Wehrden station, where changing trains was possible.

After World War II, a 1.1 kilometre long rail link was built to the Holzminden–Scherfede line, connecting Ottbergen and Holzminden between Wildberg bei Amelunxen (a suburb of Beverungen) junction and Steinberg junction. Already during the war, the German military feared that three bridges near Höxter, Fürstenberg and Meinbrexen would be targets of air attacks, and in 1944 it began the construction of this rail link (since the Fürstenberg bridge made the easiest crossing of the three over the Weser to maintain), which however could not be completed. These bridges were, however, by blown up German troops on 7 April 1945 during their retreat. As it was the easiest bridge to rebuild, British engineers reopened the Fürstenberg Bridge on 1 September 1946 for double-track operations and in parallel also completed the rail link. Since the track is essentially a big curve, it was called the Engländerkurve (English curve). It was closed on 11 December 1964 and subsequently dismantled. The Weser river bridges at Höxter and Wehrden were reopened on 13 December 1948. The bridge at Wehrden for the Solling railway was rebuilt with only one track and further repairs were subsequently carried out several times.

At Bad Karlshafen there was a second station on the left side of the Weser on Carl's Railway (Carlbahn) to Hümme, who was not connected to the Solling Railway. The station at the Solling was therefore called Karlshafen r.U. (r.U. for rechtes Ufer, right bank), while the station on Carl's Railway was called Karlshafen l.U. (l.U. for linkes Ufer, left bank).

The closed Uslar–Schönhagen (Han) railway (line number 1802; 1921/1927–1989/1990) branched off at Uslar.

== History ==
The Prussian state railways commenced construction of the line on 11 November 1873, the Ertinghausen tunnel, its highest point, was pierced on 6 September 1876, and its official opening took place on 15 January 1878. In 1886 the line was duplicated. This line was a very important route in the rail network of the German Empire, as it was a section of railway link between the industrial areas of Halle–Leipzig and the Ruhr. The construction of the railway line through it and the resulting connection with the industrial centres of eastern and western Germany, stimulated economic growth. Together with the adjoining Altenbeken-Ottbergen-Kreiensen line to the west and the South Harz Railway (Südharzbahn) to the east adjoining it became in the period between 1930 and 1945 one of the busiest for east–west freight traffic (during the Second World War more than 100 freight trains ran on the line).

The division of Germany reduced the importance of the line, although freight traffic continued as far as Walkenried on the edge of the German Democratic Republic. Freight traffic was discontinued in 1989.

After German reunification east–west traffic was concentrated on the routes through Hanover and Kassel, so this route has since only had regional importance. Beginning in early 1990 one track of the line has been dismantled. Crossings loops now only remain in Lauenförde, Bodenfelde, Uslar and Hardegsen.

Since 2000, total closure of the line has been threatened several times, although in 2002 freight traffic was temporarily resumed on a small scale. Meanwhile, the railway has been connected to the electronic interlocking in Göttingen to enable operation with little manpower.

=== Current operations ===
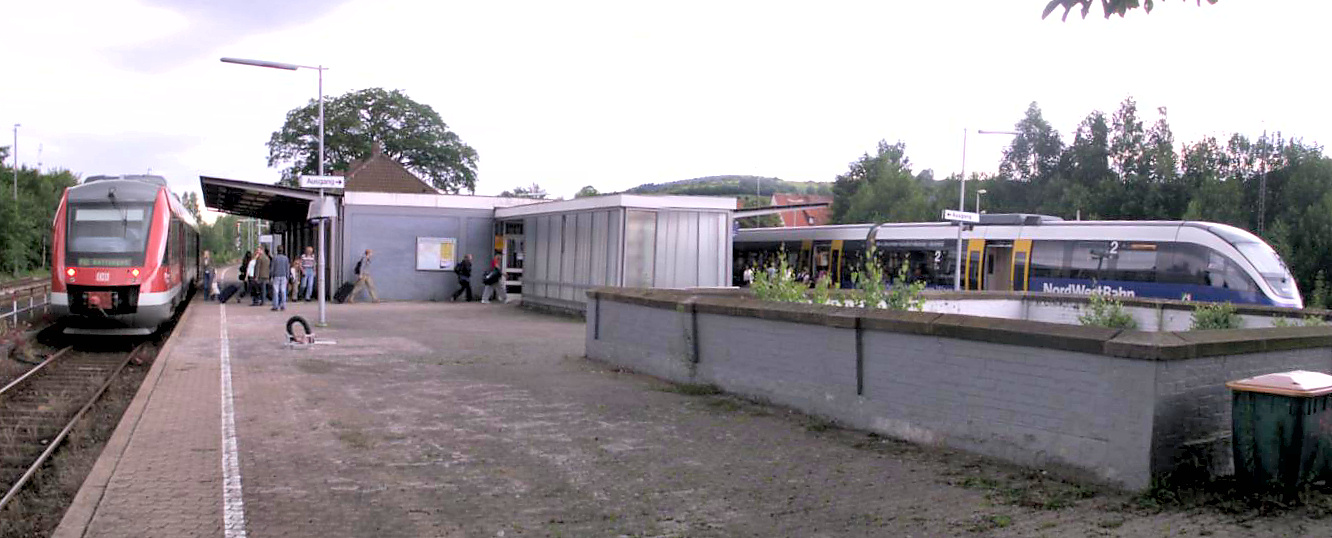
Interchange at Höxter-Ottbergen station

Since 9 December 2007, there has been a service every two hours between Ottbergen and Göttingen, which connects to Northeim in Bodenfelde. There are also additional services for school students.

Public transport fares between Ottbergen and Bad Karlshafen are set by Nahverkehrsverbund Paderborn-Höxter (Regional transport association of Paderborn-Höxter). To the east from Lauenförde-Beverungen, fares are set by Verkehrsverbundes Süd-Niedersachsen (transport association of southern Lower Saxony).

The connection from Ottbergen to Göttingen, which runs as fas as Bodenfelde on this line, is also called the Oberweserbahn (Upper Weser Railway); it continues over the Göttingen–Bodenfelde railway.

The line is currently operated with class 648 diesel multiple units.
