= South Harz Railway =

Railway line in central Germany

Northeim–Nordhausen railway
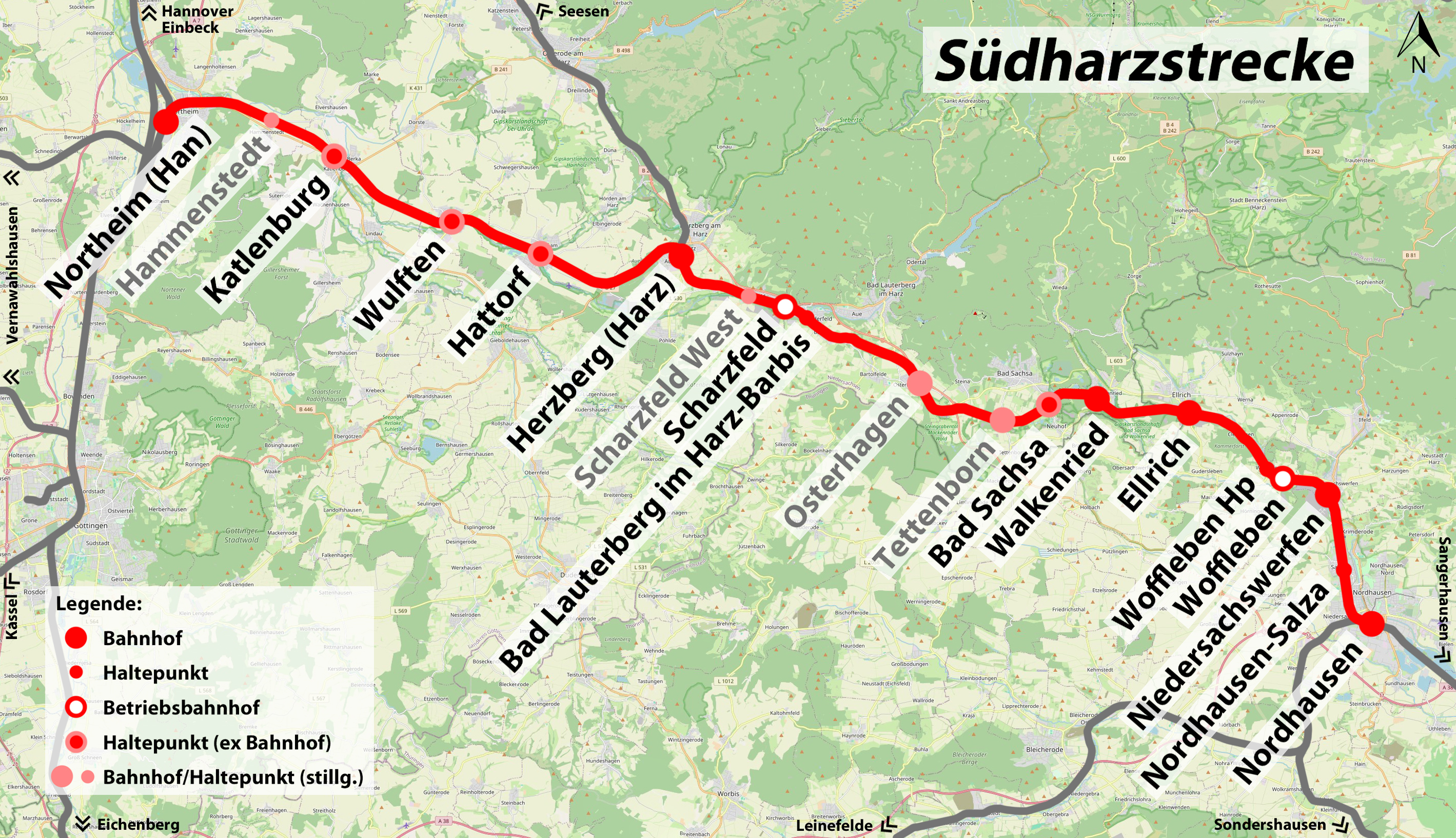

Overview
- Line number: 1810
- Locale: Lower Saxony and Thuringia, Germany

Service
- Route number: 357

Technical
- Line length: 69 km (43 mi)
- Number of tracks: 2: Northeim–Walkenried (formerly throughout)
- Track gauge: 1,435 mm (4 ft 8 1/2 in) standard gauge
- Operating speed: 100 km/h (62.1 mph) (maximum)
- Maximum incline: 1.06%

The South Harz Railway (German: Südharzstrecke or Südharzbahn) is a railway line through the German states of Lower Saxony and Thuringia. It runs from Northeim to Nordhausen, via Herzberg am Harz, Bad Lauterberg-Barbis, Bad Sachsa, Walkenried and Ellrich. The line is 69 kilometres (43 mi) long.

== Route ==
The South Harz line runs roughly east–west, with Northeim lying further north than Nordhausen. It runs from the Leine valley along the Rhume and the Oder (Harz) rivers with normal grades through Katlenburg-Lindau to Herzberg am Harz. From there it rises on a grade of up to 1.06% through Scharzfeld and Barbis to the former station of Osterhagen, the highest point of the line. The line falls gently and runs south of Bad Sachsa to Walkenried. To the east is the only tunnel on the line, connecting to the valley of the Zorge. Shortly after the tunnel is the border of Lower Saxony and Thuringia, the former Inner German border. From Ellrich the line follows the Zorge to Nordhausen. The Harz Railway (Harzquerbahn) runs parallel from Niedersachswerfen.

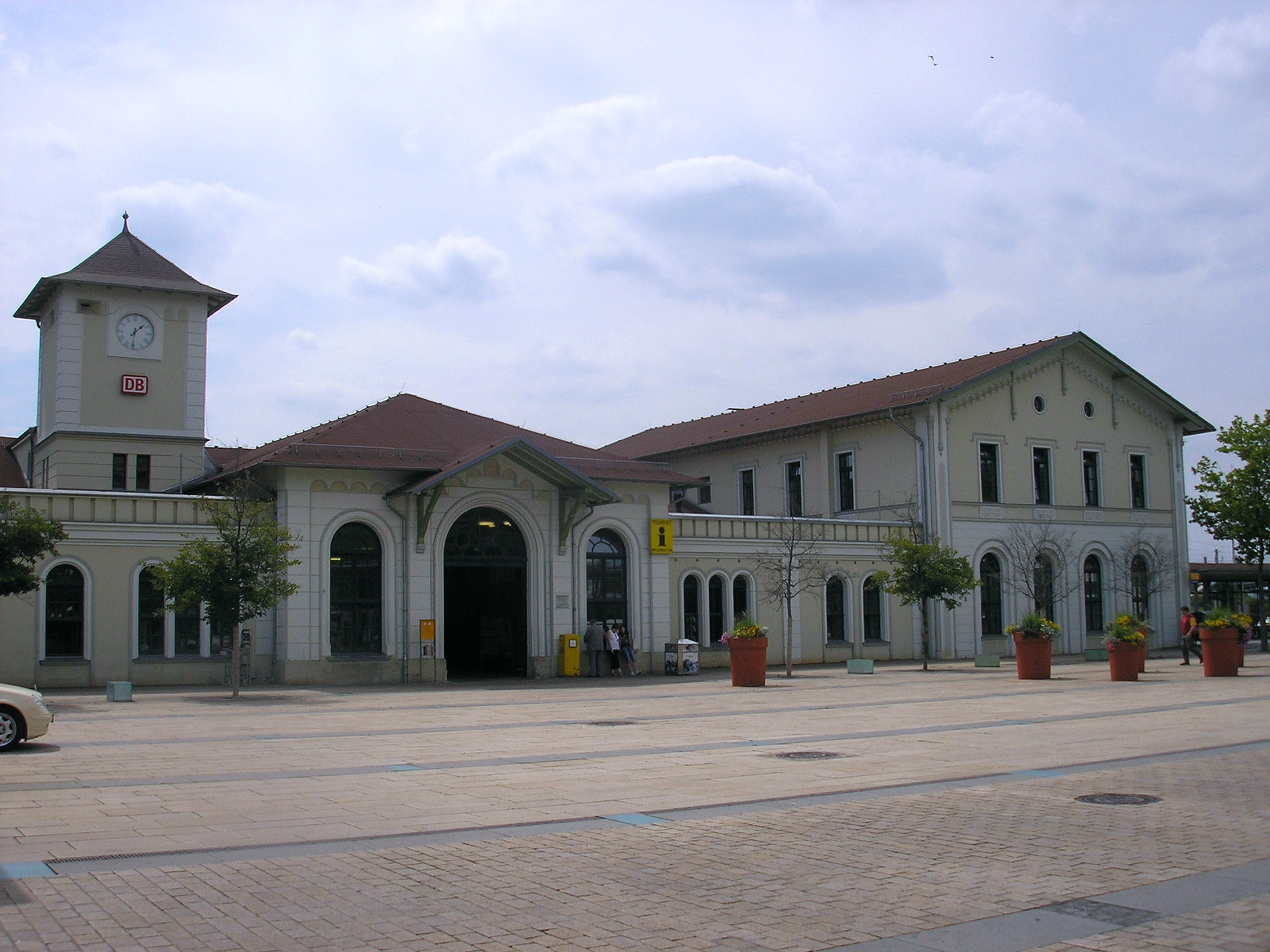
Nordhausen station

From Herzberg to Niedersachswerfen the South Harz line crosses the South Harz gypsum karst. Near Tettenborn, at Sachsenstein near Walkenried and near Woffleben there are problems with subsidence: the load-carrying capacity of the soil must be regularly controlled. During the building of the Walkenried Tunnel in 1868, the miners discovered the unstable Himmelreich cave, which made construction difficult. Three workers died during the tunnel construction, when the tunnel fell several metres.

The distance markers begin in Northeim (Han) station at 88.6 km (55.1 mi) (measured from Hanover Central) and end in Nordhausen at 157.5 km (97.9 mi).

== History ==
At the beginning of the 1860s, the Kingdom of Hanover began to consider various options for railways in the southwest of the Harz. On the one hand, a connection between the planned Altenbeken–Kreiensen and Halle–Kassel railways could be built to take a portion of east–west traffic. On the other hand, the industrial town of Osterode am Harz sought a rail connection. In 1865, it was agreed to build the line as it now exists with a branch from Katlenburg to Osterode. The section of the line in the Kingdom of Hanover would be built and operated by the Royal Hanoverian State Railways, while the Prussian section would be built and operated by the Magdeburg-Cöthen-Halle-Leipzig Railway Company (Magdeburg-Cöthen-Halle-Leipziger Eisenbahn-Gesellschaft), which owned the Halle–Kassel railway. The Austro-Prussian War of 1866 interrupted the work. Prussia won the war and confiscated the Hanoverian State Railways, giving control of the whole line to the Magdeburg-Leipzig Railway.

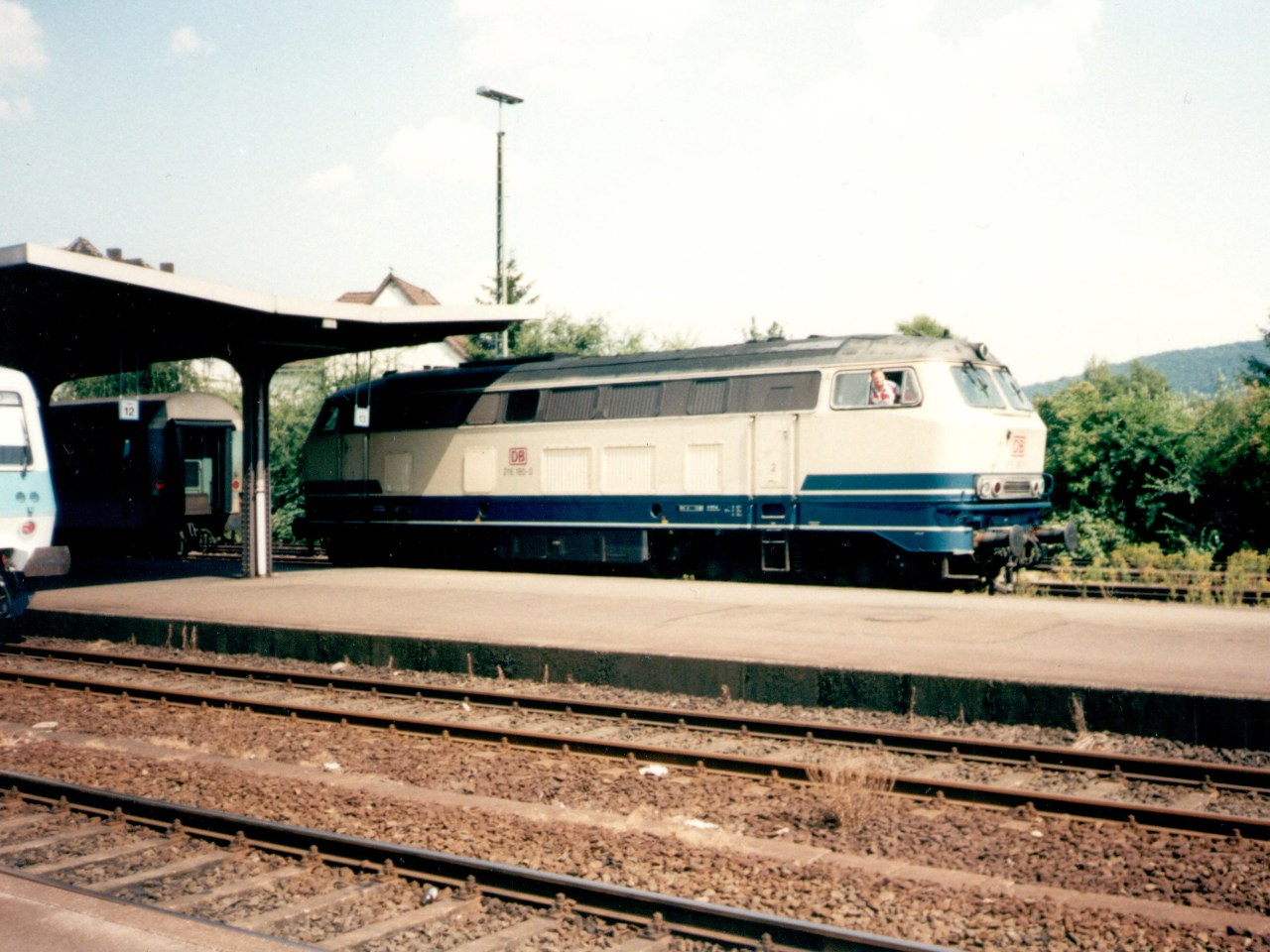
216 180-0 reached Northeim on 6 August 1995 with RE 3666 and is running around ready for the return journey.

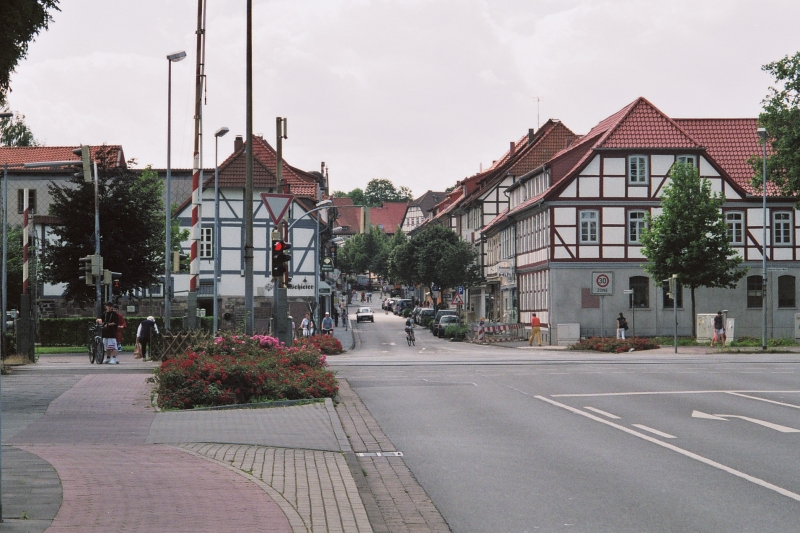
The level crossing at Northeimer Mühlentor, a possible location for a local halt.

The South Harz line was opened on 1 December 1868 from Northeim to Herzberg and it was put into operation to Nordhausen on 1 August 1869. Since the completion of the Solling Railway from Ottbergen to Northeim in 1878, it was part of the shortest route between Cologne and Leipzig. It was therefore an important freight route between the Ruhr and Halle/Leipzig until 1945. On the other hand, the line never became important for passenger traffic, since most express trains bypassed the Harz.

Near Ellrich the line crosses the modern border between Lower Saxony and Thuringia, which was the Inner German border from 1945 to 1990. The line was operated with freight trains during the existence of East Germany. Passenger services began operating along the whole line again on 12 November 1989. Since it was badly in need of repairs, trains in the 1990s and early 2000s could only run in some sections at a maximum speed of 30 km/h (19 mph). It is now possible to operate over the major part of the line at a speed of 100 km/h (62 mph).

From 1899 to 1963, Walkenried was a terminus of the metre gauge line of the South Harz Railway Company (Südharz-Eisenbahn-Gesellschaft) to Braunlage. In Ellrich, a light railway to Zorge (Kleinbahn-AG Ellrich–Zorge) branched off between 1906 and 1945.

In Scharzfeld, the former Oder Valley Railway branched off to St. Andreasberg. Passenger services on the last section to Bad Lauterberg ended on 12 December 2004. Later Scharzfeld station was also closed and replaced from the timetable change on 11 December 2005 with a new halt called Bad Lauterberg im Harz–Barbis. This is about 1 km to the east and is somewhat closer to the former Bad Lauterberg station than Scharzfeld station was. However, the new station is nearly 4.5 kilometers west of the centre of the town.

Since 1911, the town of Northeim has held so far unsuccessful negotiations with the relevant railway companies to establish a station at the Mühlentor, which would be closer to the pedestrian zone than Northeim station.

Signalling on the South Harz line will in future use electronic interlockings that are remotely controlled from a centre in Göttingen.

During World War II work began on the Helme Valley Railway (Helmetalbahn) between Osterhagen and Nordhausen to relieve congestion associated with the establishment of the nearby Mittelbau-Dora concentration camp to the northwest of Nordhausen in 1943. The camp was attached to the vast underground Mittelwerk weapons factories for building V-2s and V-1 flying bombs. Construction of the Helme Valley Railway began in 1944 and shortly later in 1945 the single-track “valley track” (Talgleis) was opened. The second track of the Helme Valley Railway, the "mountain track" (Berggleis), which would have run in the opposite direction, would have run to a point about two kilometres northeast of the junction of the South Harz line and the valley track, first crossing from the north to the south of the South Harz line and then running onto the track of the South Harz line that runs from Osterhagen to Northeim. Work was only started on its construction before work came to an end with Germany's loss of the war.

== Rail operations ==
The South Harz line is served by Regionalbahn services operated by DB Regio Niedersachsen. Since 2009, hourly services have operated between Nordhausen and Northeim, services going to or coming from Göttingen or Bodenfelde alternatively. From Monday to Friday additional services also run between Northeim and Walkenried as well as between Northeim and Herzberg, connecting in Herzberg to Osterode am Harz and Brunswick. Services are operated with Alstom Coradia LINT diesel multiple units.

== Literature ==
- Manfred Dittman: Vor 150 Jahren – Lokomotiven aus dem Harz. Vom Lokomotiv- und Tenderbau in Zorge 1842–1851. Clausthal-Zellerfeld 1992
- Joseph Högemann: Eisenbahn Altenbeken–Nordhausen. Geschichte eines Ost-West-Schienenstrangs. Verlag Kenning, Nordhorn 1991
