= Volpriehausen station =

Railway station in Uslar, Germany

Volpriehausen

General information
- Location: Volpriehausen, Niedersachsen; Germany
- Coordinates: 51°39′39″N 9°44′18″E
- Owner: DB Netz
- Operator: DB Station&Service
- Line: Sollingbahn
- Platforms: 1
- Tracks: 1

Other information
- Fare zone: VSN: 434
- Website: www.bahnhof.de

Services
| Preceding station | DB Regio Nord | Following station |
|---|---|---|
| Uslar towards Bodenfelde | RB 81 | Hardegsen towards Nordhausen |
Location
- Location within Lower Saxony

Volpriehausen (German: Bahnhof Volpriehausen) is a railway station located in Volpriehausen, Germany. The station is located on the Sollingbahn, and the train services are operated by Deutsche Bahn.

== Train services ==
The station is served by the following services:

- Local services RB 81 Bodenfelde – Northeim
