= Offensen (Kr Northeim) station =

Railway station in Uslar, Germany

Offensen
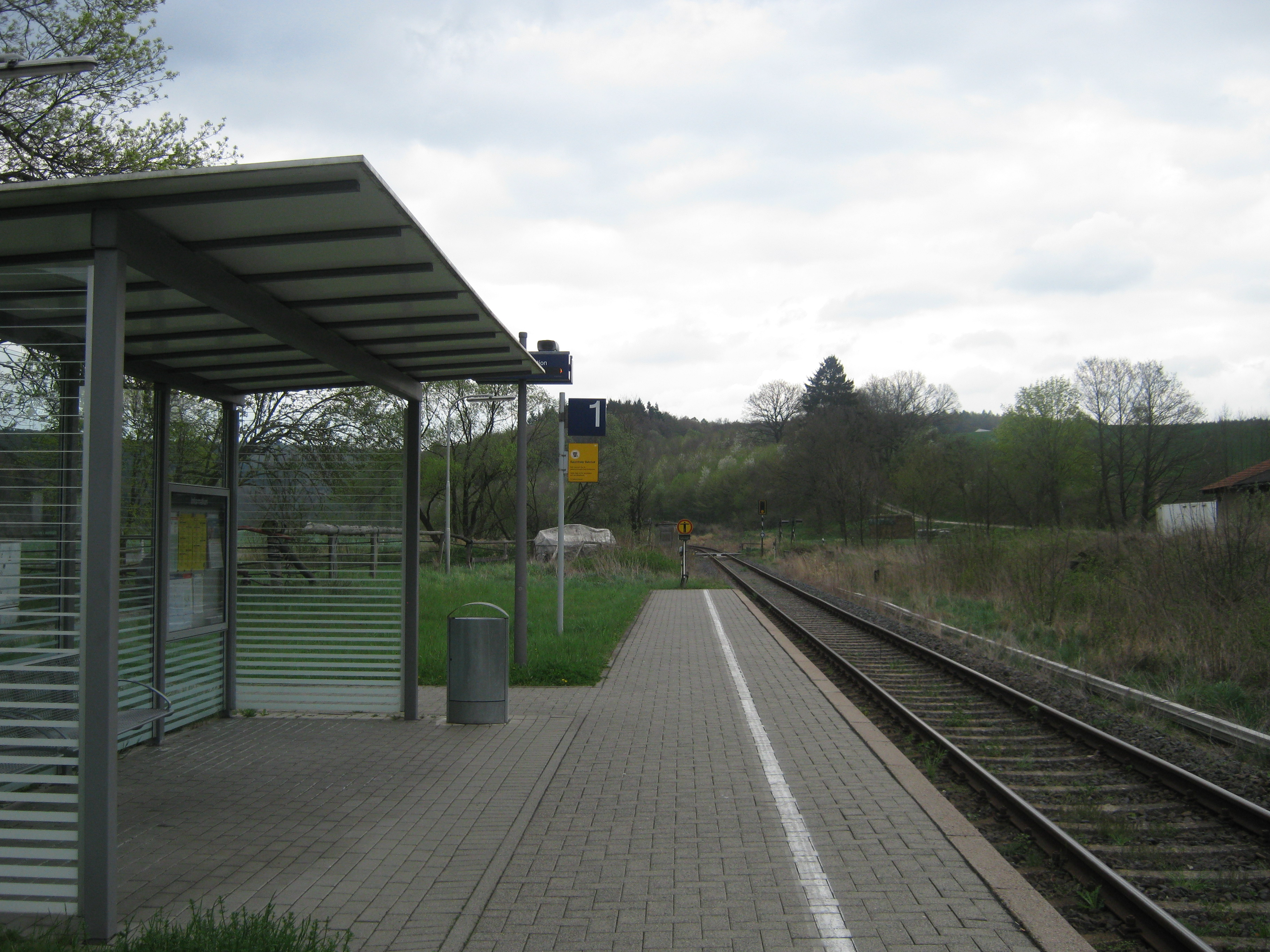
- Offensen station

General information
- Location: Offensen, Uslar, Niedersachsen; Germany
- Coordinates: 51°35′22″N 9°40′47″E
- Line: Oberweserbahn
- Platforms: 1
- Tracks: 1

Other information
- Fare zone: VSN: 436

Services
Preceding station	NordWestBahn	Following station
Vernawahlshausen towards Höxter-Ottbergen	RB 85	Adelebsen towards Göttingen
Location

Offensen is a railway station located just outside Offensen, a district of the town of Uslar in the Northeim area, Lower Saxony, Germany. The station is located on the Oberweserbahn and the train services are operated by NordWestBahn.

== Train services ==
The station is served by the following services:

- Local services RB 85 Ottbergen – Bad Karlshafen – Bodenfelde – Göttingen
