= Adelebsen station =

Railway station in Adelebsen, Germany

Adelebsen
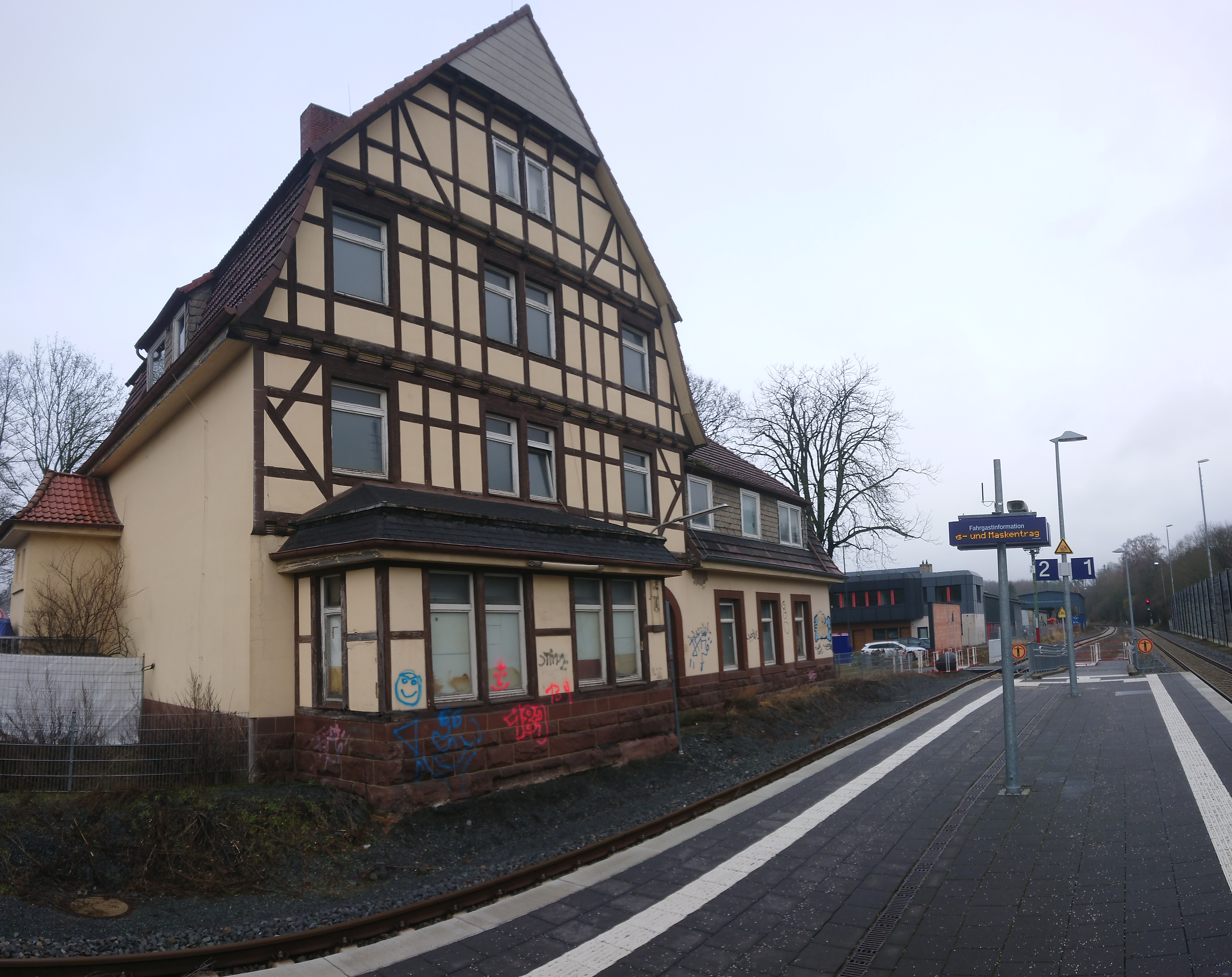
- Adelebsen station

General information
- Location: Adelebsen, Niedersachsen; Germany
- Coordinates: 51.3440°N 9.4536°E
- Line: Oberweserbahn
- Platforms: 1
- Tracks: 1

Other information
- Fare zone: VSN: 290

Services
Preceding station	NordWestBahn	Following station
Offensen towards Höxter-Ottbergen	RB 85	Lödingsen towards Göttingen
Location

Adelebsen (German: Bahnhof Adelebsen) is a railway station located in Adelebsen, Germany. The station is located on the Oberweserbahn. The train services are operated by NordWestBahn.

== Train services ==
The station is served by the following services:

- Regional services RB 85 Ottbergen – Bad Karlshafen – Bodenfelde – Göttingen
