= Bad Karlshafen station =

Railway station in Bad Karlshafen, Germany

Bad Karlshafen
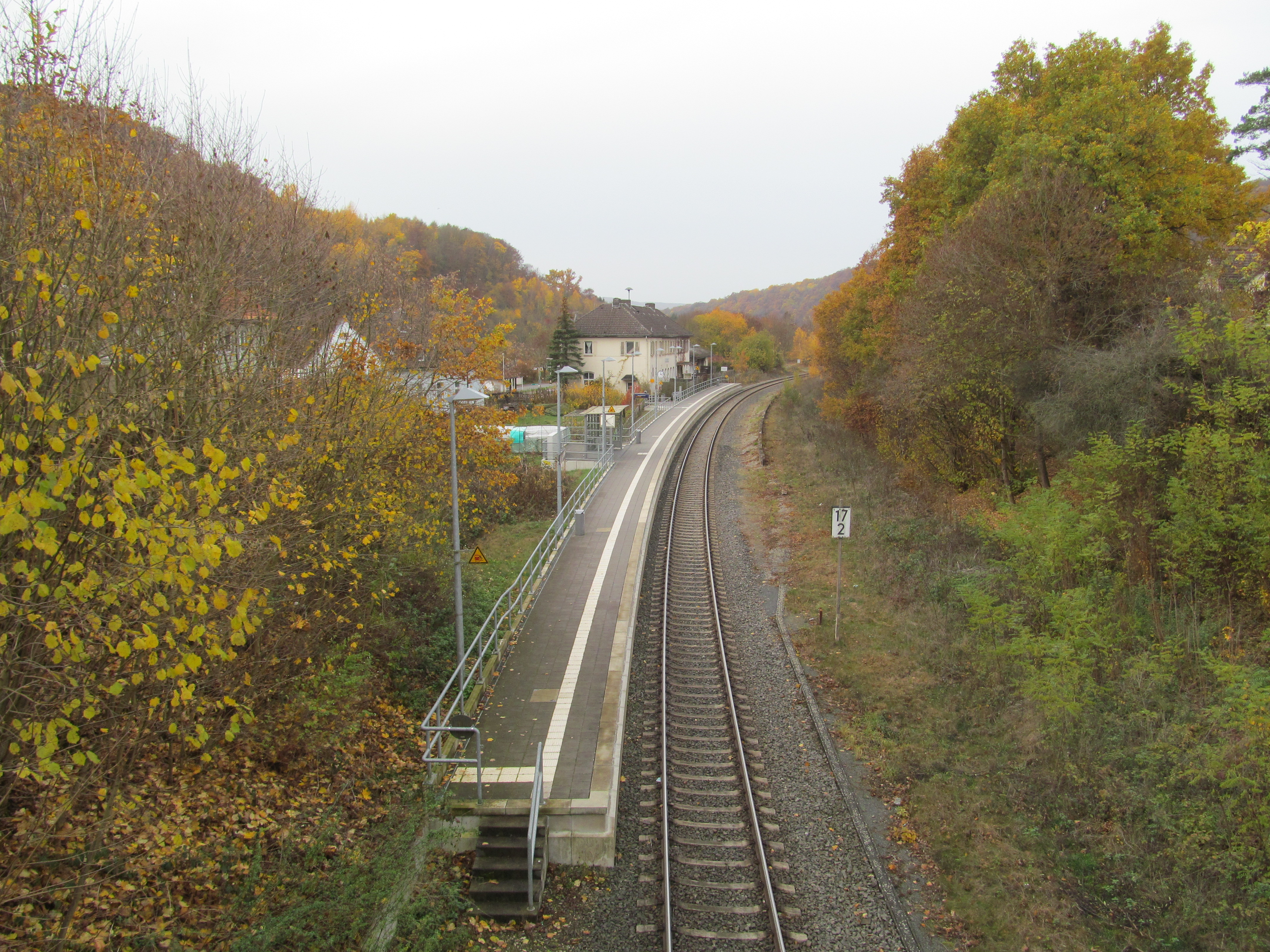
- 2018

General information
- Location: Bad Karlshafen, Hesse; Germany
- Coordinates: 51°38′47″N 9°26′44″E
- Owner: Deutsche Bahn
- Operator: DB Netz; DB Station&Service
- Line: Solling Railway
- Platforms: 1
- Tracks: 1
- Connections: RB 85; 180 523 R22

Other information
- Station code: 287
- Category: 6
- Fare zone: NVV: 3020; VSN: 630 (NVV transitional tariff); Westfalentarif: 79830 (NVV transitional tariff)
- Website: www.bahnhof.de

Services
Preceding station	NordWestBahn	Following station
Lauenförde-Beverungen towards Höxter-Ottbergen	RB 85	Bodenfelde towards Göttingen
Location

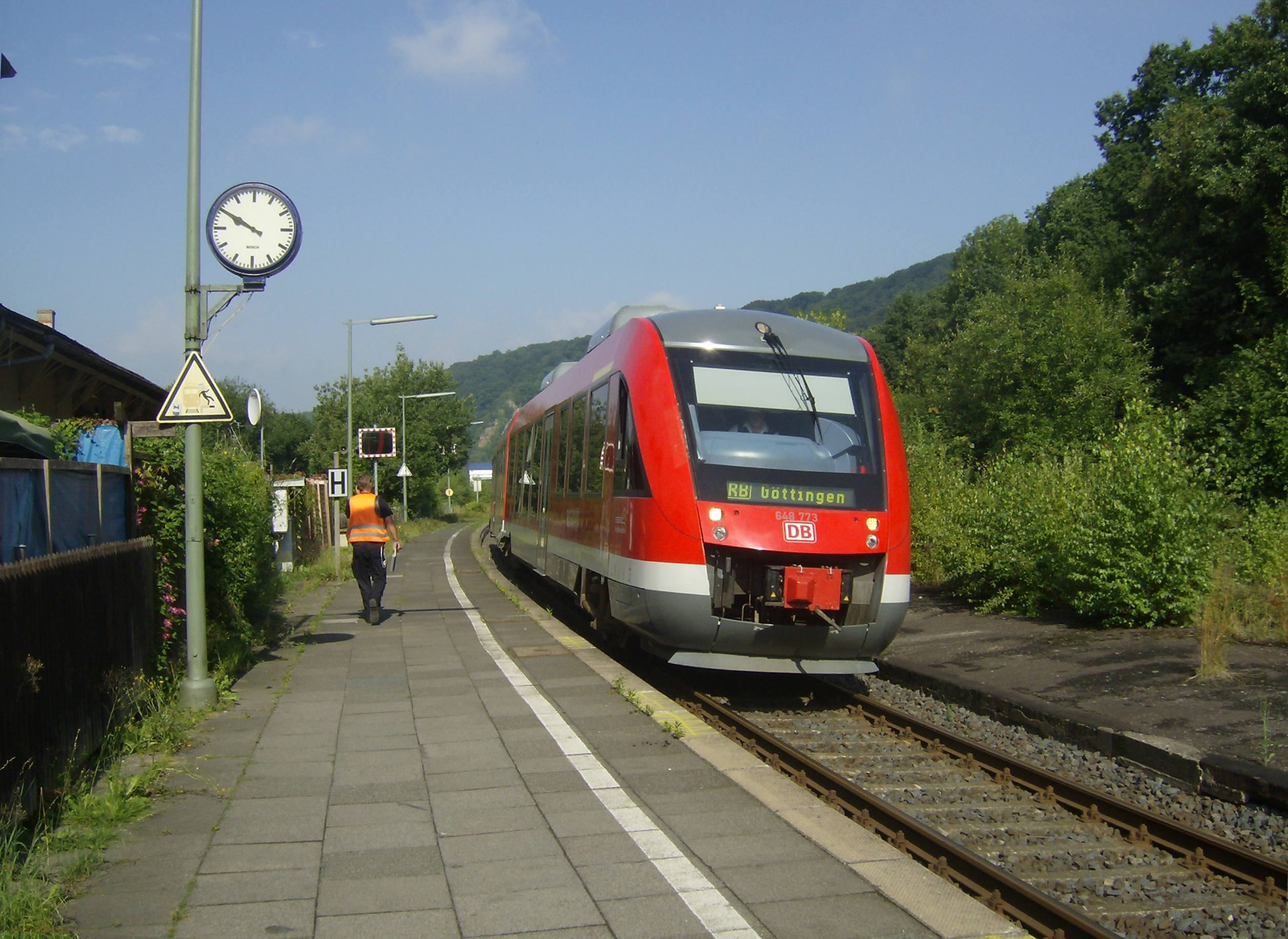
A class 648 arrives at Bad Karlshafen

Bad Karlshafen is a railway station located in Bad Karlshafen, Germany. The station is located on the Sollingbahn. The train services are operated by NordWestBahn. The station is close to the borders of three states: Hesse, North Rhine-Westphalia and Lower Saxony.

A former station to the south of the river existed until 1966 on the Carlsbahn.

== Train services ==
The station is served by the following services:

- Local services RB 85 Ottbergen – Bad Karlshafen – Bodenfelde – Göttingen
