= Lödingsen station =

Railway station in Adelebsen, Germany

Lödingsen
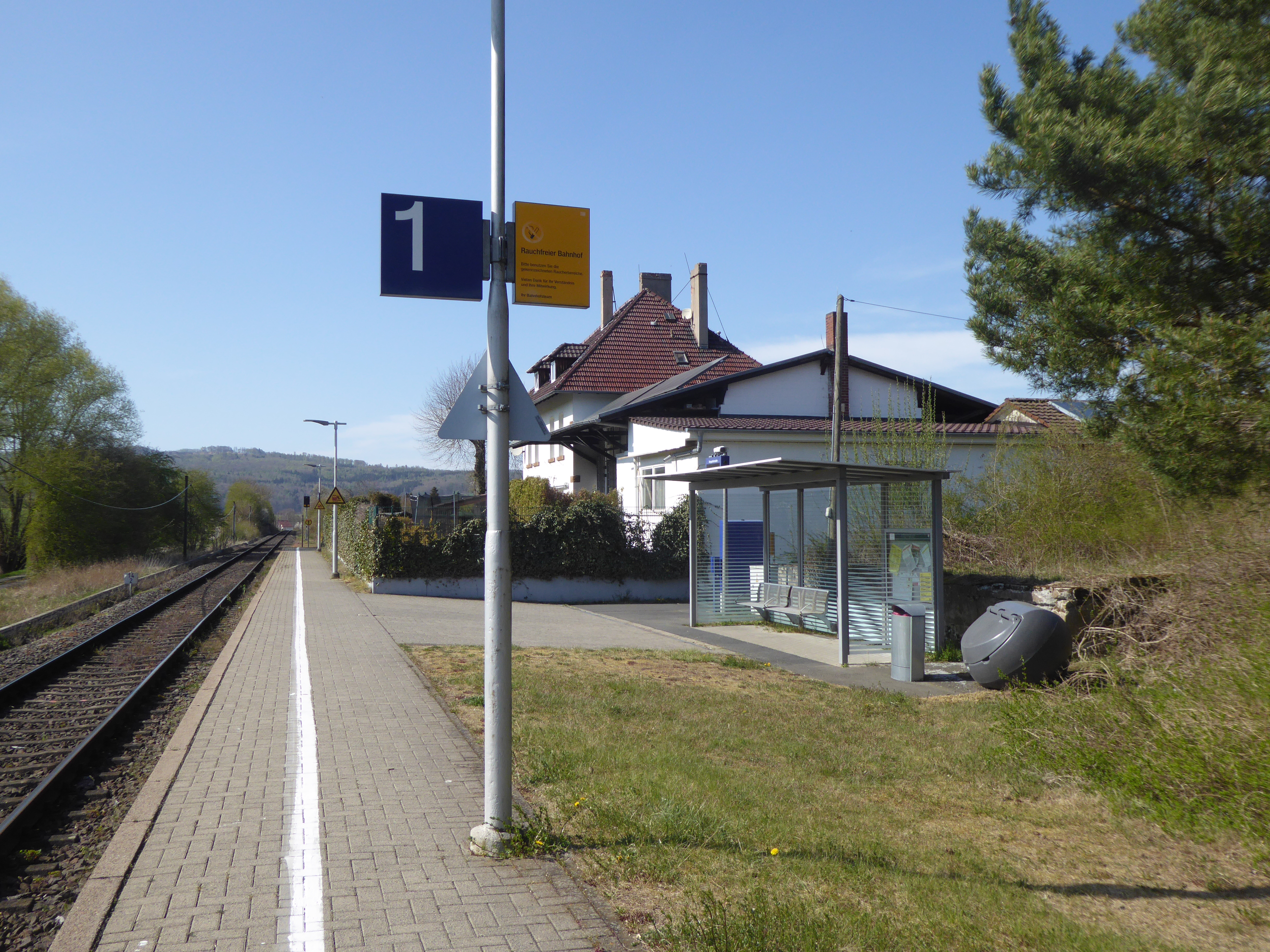
- Lödingsen station

General information
- Location: Lödingsen, Niedersachsen; Germany
- Coordinates: 51°35′21″N 9°47′25″E
- Line: Oberweserbahn
- Platforms: 1
- Tracks: 1

Other information
- Fare zone: VSN: 291

Services
Preceding station	NordWestBahn	Following station
Adelebsen towards Höxter-Ottbergen	RB 85	Lenglern towards Göttingen
Location

Lödingsen is a railway station located in Lödingsen, Germany. The station is located on the Oberweserbahn and the train services are operated by NordWestBahn.

== Train services ==
The station is served by the following services:

- Local services RB 85 Ottbergen – Bad Karlshafen – Bodenfelde – Göttingen
