= Lenglern station =

Railway station in Bovenden, Germany

Lenglern
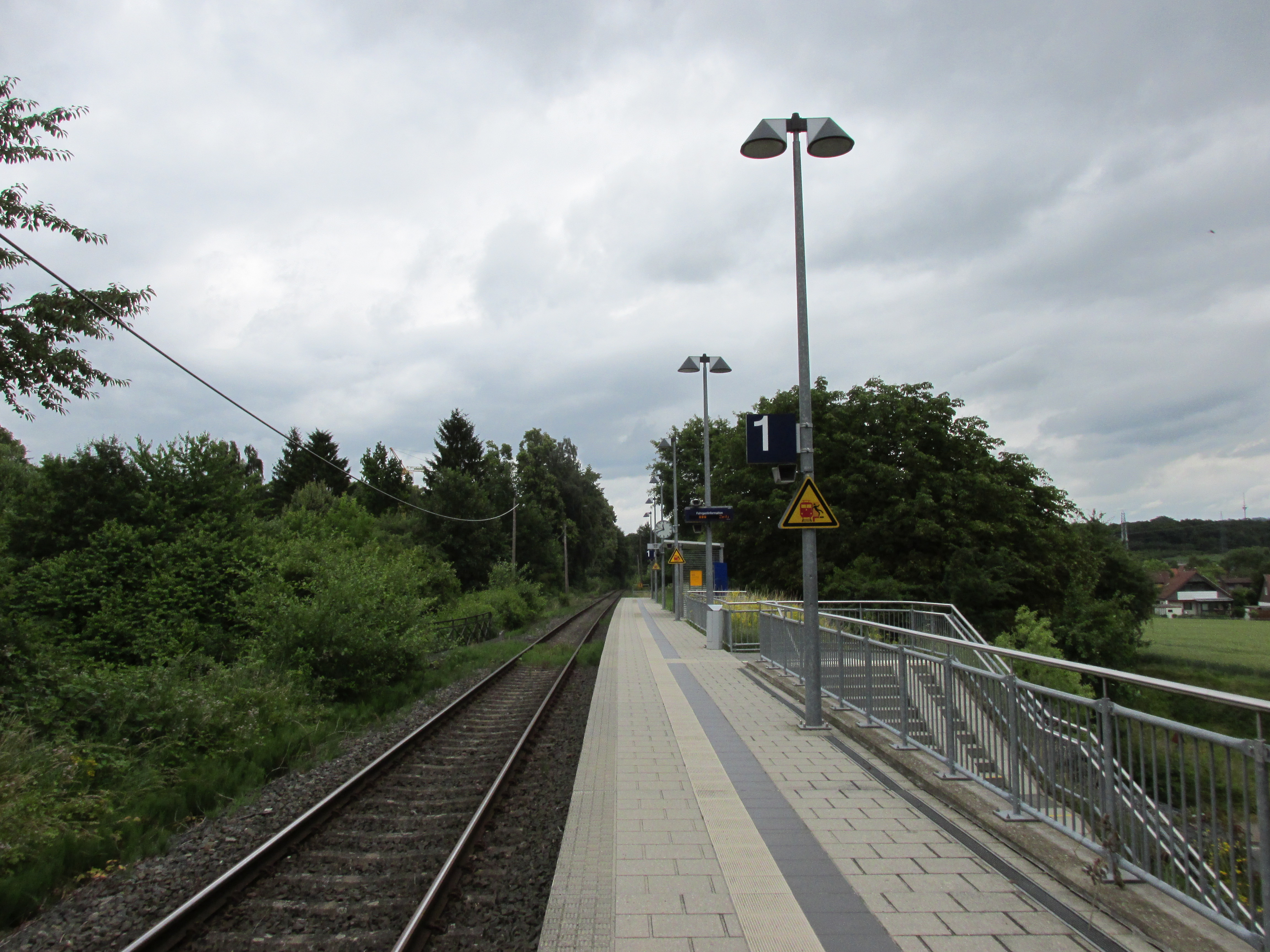

General information
- Location: Lenglern, Niedersachsen; Germany
- Coordinates: 51°35′16″N 9°52′15″E
- Line: Oberweserbahn
- Platforms: 1
- Tracks: 1

Other information
- Fare zone: VSN: 281

Services
Preceding station	NordWestBahn	Following station
Lödingsen towards Höxter-Ottbergen	RB 85	Göttingen Terminus
Location

Lenglern is a railway station located in Lenglern, Germany. The station is located on the Oberweserbahn and the train services are operated by NordWestBahn.

== Train services ==
The station is served by the following services:

- Local services RB 85 Ottbergen – Bad Karlshafen – Bodenfelde – Göttingen
