= General Federation of Agriculture, Food, Tobacco and Related Services Workers =

Trade union of France

The General Federation of Agriculture, Food, Tobacco and Related Services Workers (French: Fédération générale des travailleurs de l'agriculture, de l'alimentation, des tabacs et des services annexes, FGTA) is a trade union representing workers in a range of related industries in France.

The union was founded in 1975, when the National Federation of Agricultural Workers merged with the Federation of Workers in Food and Retail. Like its predecessors, the union affiliated to Workers' Force. From formation until 1997, it was led by Jean-Marie Goube. In 1988, the Federation of Tobacco and Matches merged in. By 1995, the union claimed 14,000 members.
