= Hardegsen station =

Railway station in Hardegsen, Germany

Hardegsen
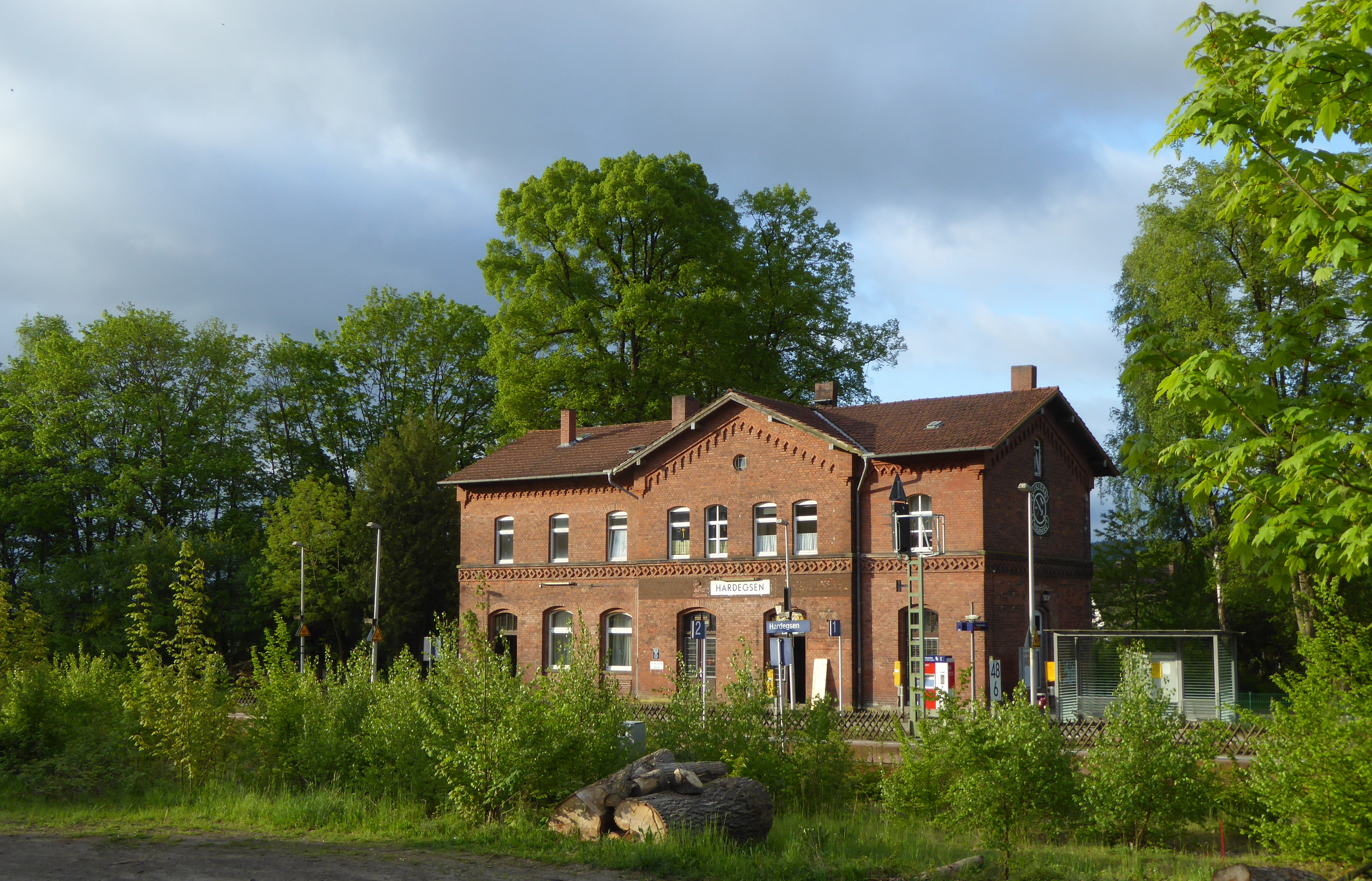
- Hardegsen station in 2015

General information
- Location: Hardegsen, Niedersachsen; Germany
- Coordinates: 51°39′34″N 9°49′32″E
- Owner: DB Netz
- Operator: DB Station&Service
- Line: Sollingbahn
- Platforms: 1
- Tracks: 1

Other information
- Fare zone: VSN: 420
- Website: www.bahnhof.de

Services
Preceding station	DB Regio Nord	Following station
Volpriehausen towards Bodenfelde	RB 81	Northeim (Han) towards Nordhausen
Location
- Location within Lower Saxony

Hardegsen (German: Bahnhof Hardegsen) is a railway station located in Hardegsen, Germany. The station is located on the Sollingbahn, and the train services are operated by Deutsche Bahn.

== Train services ==
The station is served by the following services:

- Local services RB 81 Bodenfelde – Northeim
