= Karl Deichmann =

German trade unionist and politician

Karl Deichmann (5 October 1863 – 12 February 1940) was a German trade unionist and politician.

Born in Uslar, Deichmann was orphaned at an early age and went to work in a cigar factory at the age of 11. He moved to Bremen in 1884, and soon joined the Social Democratic Party of Germany (SPD) and the German Tobacco Workers' Union. He became associated with the right wing of the trade union movement, and worked closely with Friedrich Ebert. In 1900, he was elected as the president of the union, and from 1910 until 1918, he additionally served as General Secretary of the International Federation of Tobacco Workers. In 1912, he was elected to the Reichstag.

Deichmann was a supporter of the November Revolution and joined the Bremen Workers' and Soldiers' Council, but he opposed the idea of a workers' republic. In 1919, he joined the provisional Bürgerschaft of Bremen, where he took on responsibility for the police. He was then elected to the regularly constituted Bürgerschaft, which appointed him to the Senate of Bremen. From 1919 until 1920, he served as President and Mayor of the Senate. He was again appointed to the Senate in 1928, with responsibility for policing, and became the Mayor of the Senate again.

In 1931, Deichmann retired, due to poor health. He died in 1940.

Trade union offices
Preceded by Hermann Junge	President of the German Tobacco Workers' Union; 1900–1928	Succeeded by Ferdinand Husung
Preceded by H. Jughers	General Secretary of the International Federation of Tobacco Workers; 1910–1918	Succeeded by Harry Eichelsheim
Political offices
Preceded by Martin Donandt	President and Mayor of the Senate of Bremen; 1919–1920	Succeeded by Martin Donandt
Preceded by Martin Donandt	Mayor of the Senate of Bremen; 1928–1931	Succeeded by Martin Donandt
