= German Tobacco Workers' Union =

Former German Reich trade union (1872–1933)

- Deutscher Tabakarbeiter-Verband
- Predecessor: German Cigar Workers' Union
- Successor: Union of Trade, Food and Luxuries (E Germany), Food, Beverages and Catering Union (W Germany)
- Founded: 1872
- Dissolved: 2 May 1933
- Headquarters: 58/60 Faulenstraße, Bremen
- Location: Germany
- Members: 75,501 (1928)
- Publication: Der Tabakarbeiter
- Affiliations: ADGB, IFTW

The German Tobacco Workers' Union (German: Deutscher Tabakarbeiter-Verband) was a trade union representing people in the tobacco manufacturing industry in Germany.

The German Cigar Workers' Union was founded in 1848, but was subsequently banned. Friedrich Wilhelm Fritzsche formed the General German Cigar Workers' Association in Leipzig in 1865, and within two years it had 6,500 members, making it one of the largest unions of the day. It was linked closely with the General German Workers' Association (ADAV), whose leader wished to establish dictatorial powers. Fritzsche and the majority of the union rejected this, but a minority split away, in order to remain with the ADAV.

In 1872, the two unions merged, to form the "German Tobacco Workers' Union", again under the leadership of Fritzsche. It was banned by the Anti-Socialist Laws of 1878, but Fritzsche maintained an underground organisation through the magazine, Der Wanderer, and its successor, Der Tabakarbeiter.

On 22 November 1882, the union was re-established, at a meeting in Bremen, as a "Travel Support Association". From 1889, it could operate legally once more, renaming itself again as the "German Tobacco Workers' Union", and it grew to have 14,538 members by 1890. In 1912, the small Union of Cigar Sorters and Box Gluers in Germany merged in. It affiliated to the General German Trade Union Confederation and grew steadily. By 1928, its membership was 75,501, which meant it was no longer one of the larger German unions.

The union was banned by the Nazis in 1933. After World War II, tobacco workers were represented as part of the Food, Beverages and Catering Union.

== Presidents ==
1882: Wilhelm Fuhse
1884: Hermann Junge
1900: Karl Deichmann
1928: Ferdinand Husung
