= Altenbeken–Kreiensen railway =

Railway line in Germany

Overview
- Line number: 1760 (Altenbeken–Langeland); 2974 (Langeland–Holzminden); 1940 (Holzminden–Kreiensen)
- Locale: Lower Saxony, Germany

Service
- Route number: 403 (Altenbeken–Holzminden); 354 (Holzminden–Kreiensen)

Technical
- Line length: 93.5 km (58.1 mi)
- Number of tracks: 2: Altenbeken–Höxter-Ottbergen; Stadtoldendorf–Vorwohle
- Operating speed: 80 km/h (50 mph) (maximum)

The Altenbeken–Kreiensen railway is part of a former long-distance route in Germany from the Ruhr area via Altenbeken, Höxter-Ottbergen, Holzminden, Kreiensen and Seesen towards Berlin. The once continuous double track main line railway is now operated as a single track east of Ottbergen. It runs through the Egge ridge and along the northern edge of the Solling hills.

The section in North Rhine-Westphalia up to and including Holzminden is also known as the Egge Railway (German: Eggebahn).

== History ==
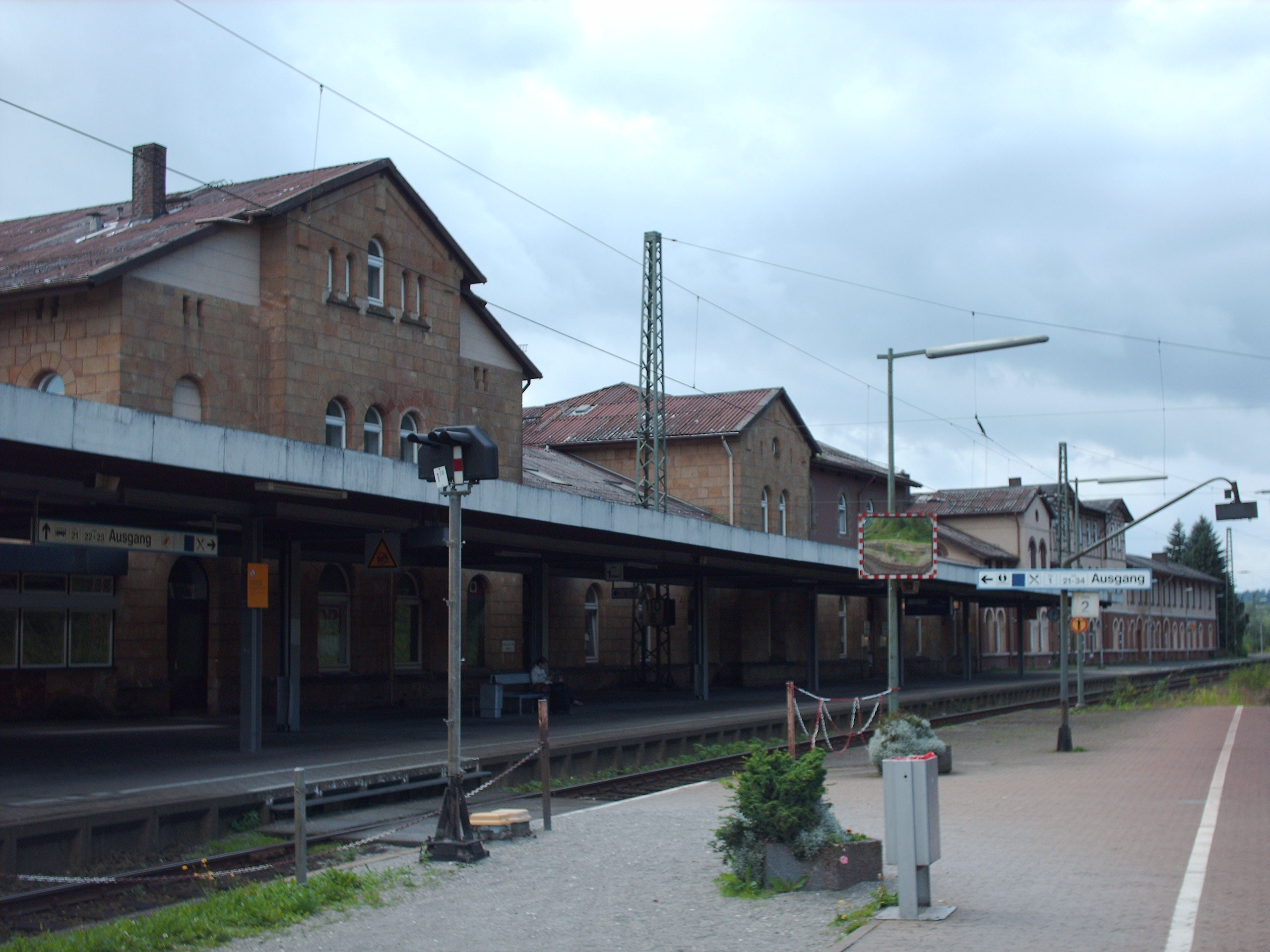
Northern side of Altenbeken station.

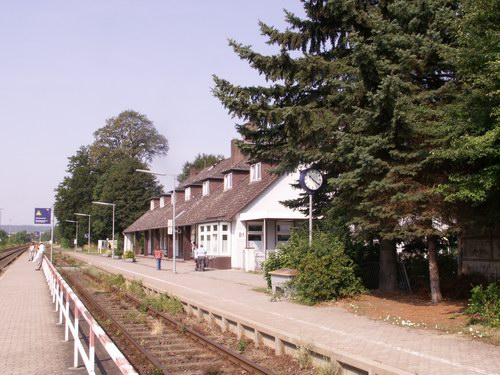
Brakel station

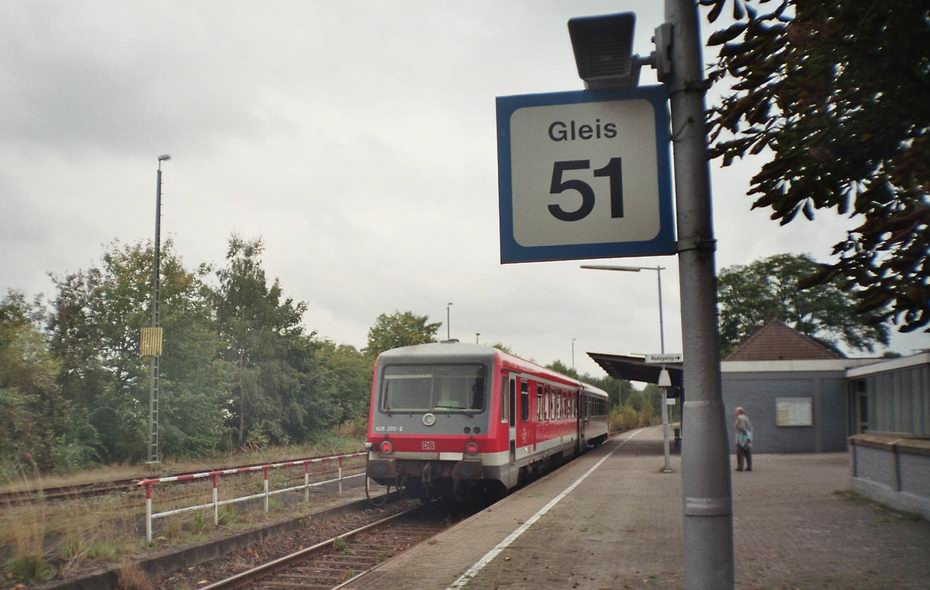
Höxter-Ottbergen station

The line from Altenbeken to Godelheim was opened on 1 October 1864 by the Royal Westphalian Railway Company and extended on 10 October 1865 to Holzminden. It connected with the Brunswick Southern Railway, which was opened by the Duchy of Brunswick State Railway between Holzminden and Kreiensen on 10 October 1865, creating a link with Brunswick (Braunschweig). To connect with the Brunswick area the line bypassed the town of Einbeck with two tunnels and a long climb. Originally the route was considered a long distance line from the Ruhr to Brunswick and Berlin. The section east of Ottbergen remained a secondary line because after Prussia’s annexation of the Kingdom of Hanover in 1866 a bypass of Hanover was no longer necessary. The section from Altenbeken to Ottbergen connected with the Solling Railway (Sollingbahn), opened in 1873, and the South Harz Railway (Südharzstrecke), opened 1868–69, creating an important west-east connection to Göttingen, Halle and Leipzig. The line lost importance because more traffic shifted to the north-south direction over the decades after 1945 as a result of the division of Germany. The most striking construction on the Egge Railway is the 1,631 m long Rehberg Tunnel at Altenbeken.

As late as the 1980s there had been for years a continuous long distance express ("D-train", D-Zug, short for Durchgangszug, literally “corridor train”) with through carriages that were separated in Altenbeken and continued towards Höxter. In the 1990s through trains also ran on the line from Ottbergen to Nordhausen in Thuringia. The Paderborn–Holzminden–Kreiensen service ended with the handover of passenger operations between Paderborn and Holzminden on the line to NordWestBahn in December 2003.

The line is now double track between Altenbeken and Ottbergen and between Stadtoldendorf and Vorwohle. Since October 2008 it has been controlled by an electronic interlocking operating from Göttingen.

== Operations ==
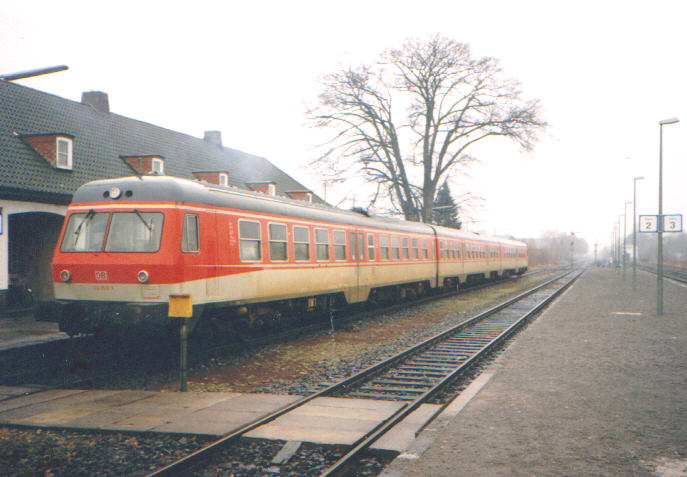
RB Ottbergen–Kreiensen: BR 614 in the 1990s in Ottbergen station

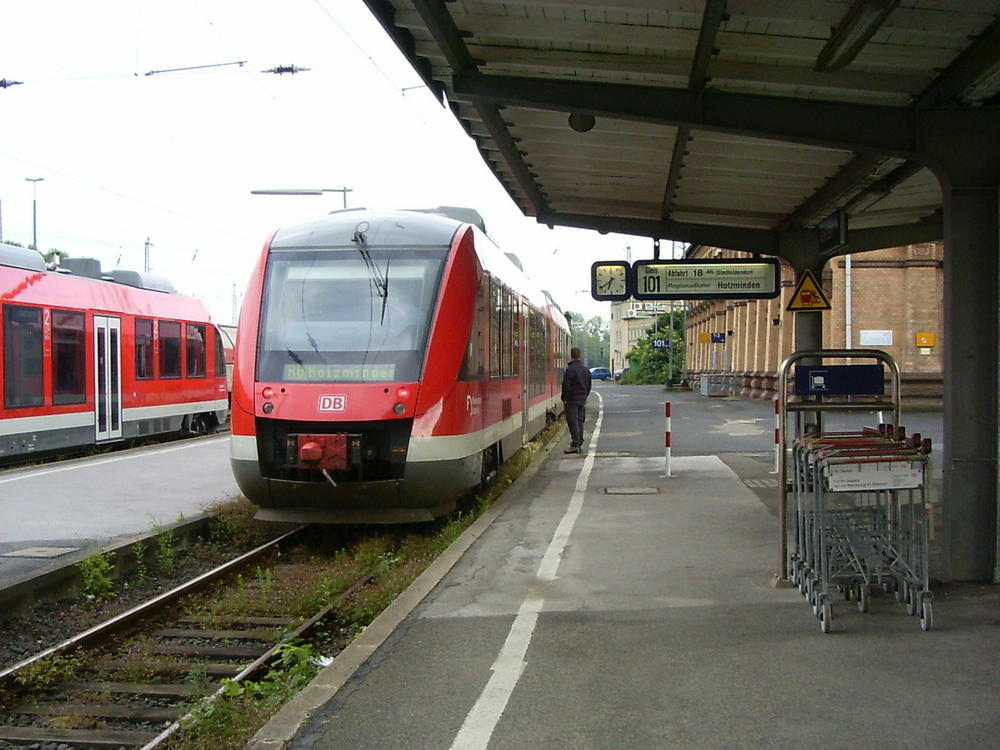
Train to Holzminden in Kreiensen

Between December 2003 and December 2013, passengers operations on the line was divided into two sections at Holzminden. The Regionalbahn service RB 84 (Egge-Bahn) ran hourly throughout every day of the week. In Paderborn it became RB 74 Senne-Bahn running to Bielefeld on the Senne Railway. The eastern section was operated every two hours by Deutsche Bahn with Alstom Coradia LINT diesel single-units. Most services continued over the Kreiensen–Brunswick line to Bad Harzburg.

With the timetable change on 15 December 2013, both services were combined as RB 84 (Paderborn–Höxter-Ottbergen–Kreiensen) in the OWL diesel network and operated by NordWestBahn. The service continued over the Paderborn–Holzminden section each hour. The section east of Holzminden was only operated every the two hours. The service was operated with Bombardier Talent DMUs able to run at 120 km/h. The route east of Altenbeken is mostly able to be run at 100 km/h. The average speed is 66 km/h.

In December 2015, portion working was introduced Ottbergen with an RB 84 service (Kreiensen–Holzminden–Paderborn) and a RB 85 service (Ottbergen–Göttingen). Passengers can now travel from both Göttingen and Kreiensen to Paderborn. To implement the measure Höxter-Ottbergen station had to be rebuilt with a storage track and track connections. The implementation of these measures began in September 2014 within the "Modernisation Initiative 2" (Modernisierungsoffensive 2).
