= Uslar station =

Railway station in Uslar, Germany

Uslar
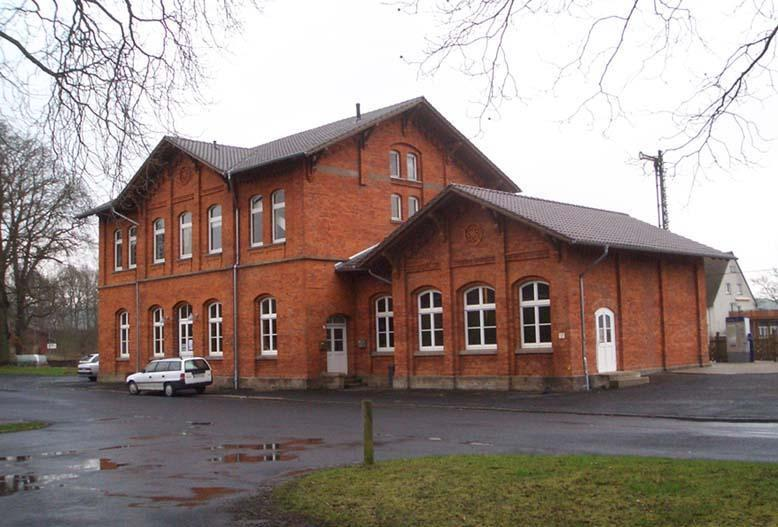
- Uslar station is now a cultural centre

General information
- Location: Uslar, Niedersachsen; Germany
- Coordinates: 51°39′16″N 9°39′19″E
- Line: Sollingbahn
- Platforms: 1
- Tracks: 1

Other information
- Fare zone: VSN: 430
- Website: www.bahnhof.de

Services
Preceding station	DB Regio Nord	Following station
Bodenfelde Terminus	RB 81	Volpriehausen towards Nordhausen
Location
- Location within Lower Saxony

Uslar (German: Bahnhof Uslar) is a railway station located in Uslar, Germany. The station is located on the Sollingbahn, and the train services are operated by Deutsche Bahn.

== Train services ==
The station is served by the following services:

- Local services RB 81 Bodenfelde – Northeim
