= Vernawahlshausen station =

Railway station in Wahlsburg, Germany

Vernawahlshausen
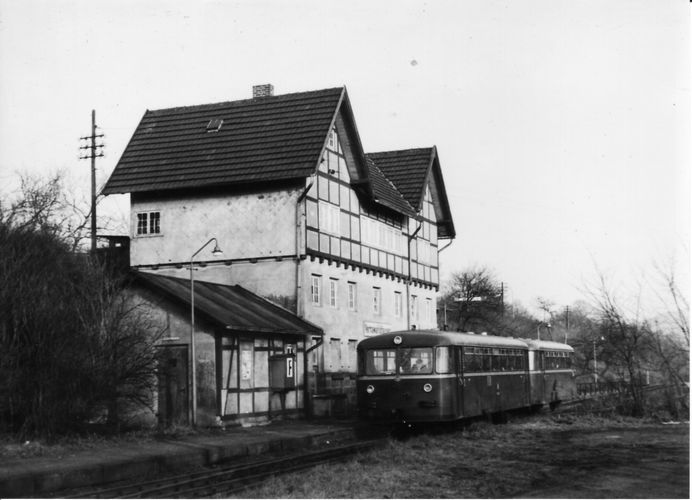
- Vernawahlshausen station with Uerdingen railbus, c. 1970

General information
- Location: Vernawahlshausen, Hesse; Germany
- Coordinates: 51°37′45″N 9°36′51″E
- Line: Upper Weser Railway
- Platforms: 1

Other information
- Station code: 6409
- DS100 code: HVWH
- Category: 7
- Fare zone: NVV: 3270; VSN: 621 (NVV transitional tariff)
- Website: www.bahnhof.de

Services
Preceding station	NordWestBahn	Following station
Bodenfelde towards Höxter-Ottbergen	RB 85	Offensen (Kr Northeim) towards Göttingen
Location

Vernawahlshausen is a railway station located just outside Vernawahlshausen, Germany. The station is located on the Oberweserbahn and the train services are operated by NordWestBahn.

== Train services ==
The station is served by the following services:

- Local services RB 85 Ottbergen – Bad Karlshafen – Bodenfelde – Göttingen
