= Ferdinand Husung =

German trade union leader

Ferdinand Husung (18 October 1879 – 2 April 1962) was a German trade union leader.

Born in Groß Wochsung, Husung moved to Bremen, and became the vice president of the German Tobacco Workers' Union in 1919. In 1928, he was elected as the union's president, and in 1931, he additionally became general secretary of the International Federation of Tobacco Workers.

The Nazi government banned the trade unions in 1933, but Husung survived the war. In 1946, he was elected to the Bürgerschaft of Bremen, representing the Social Democratic Party of Germany. From 1949 until 1951, he worked as a secretary at the head office of the Food, Beverages and Catering Union.

Trade union offices
Preceded by Karl Deichmann	President of the German Tobacco Workers' Union; 1928–1933	Succeeded by Union banned
Preceded by Harry Eichelsheim	General Secretary of the International Federation of Tobacco Workers; 1931–1933	Succeeded by Edmund Olsen
