= Marcelle Delabit =

French trade unionist

Marcelle Jeanne Delabit (9 June 1892 – April 1969) was a French trade unionist.

Born in Paris as Marcelle Hartmann, Delabit worked in a tobacco factory. During World War I, she was promoted to become a supervisor. She joined the National Federation of Workers of the Tobacco Manufactures of France, an affiliate of the General Confederation of Labour, and in 1922 was elected as its deputy general secretary.

In 1928, Delabit became general secretary of the renamed Federation of Tobacco and Matches. She became increasingly prominent in the CGT, serving on its administrative committee, and writing regularly for its newspaper, Le Peuple. She was also active in the French Section of the Workers' International, and in the pacifist movement.

In 1936, the Unitary Federation of Tobacco and Matches merged into Delabit's union. This union was dominated by members of the French Communist Party, and Delabit strongly opposed their growing influence, becoming a leading member of the group around the Syndicates journal.

Trade unions were banned during World War II, but Delabit served on the Economic and Trade Union Studies Committee which grouped together former leaders of the CGT who supported Léon Jouhaux. At the end of the war, she regained her position as leader of the union, now named the "Federation of Tobacco Manufacturing Services", and the administrative committee of the CGT. In 1945, she was also elected as president of the International Federation of Tobacco Workers.

In 1948, Delabit's union switched to the newly founded Workers' Force (FO), with Delabit's support, and she was elected to FO's first executive. She retired in 1962, and underwent a major operation in 1969, from which she did not recover.

Trade union offices
Preceded by ?	General Secretary of the Federation of Tobacco and Matches; 1928–1962	Succeeded by Lucien Trichard
Preceded by V. Novack	President of the International Federation of Tobacco Workers; 1945–1958	Succeeded by Federation merged
