= Harry Eichelsheim =

Dutch trade unionist

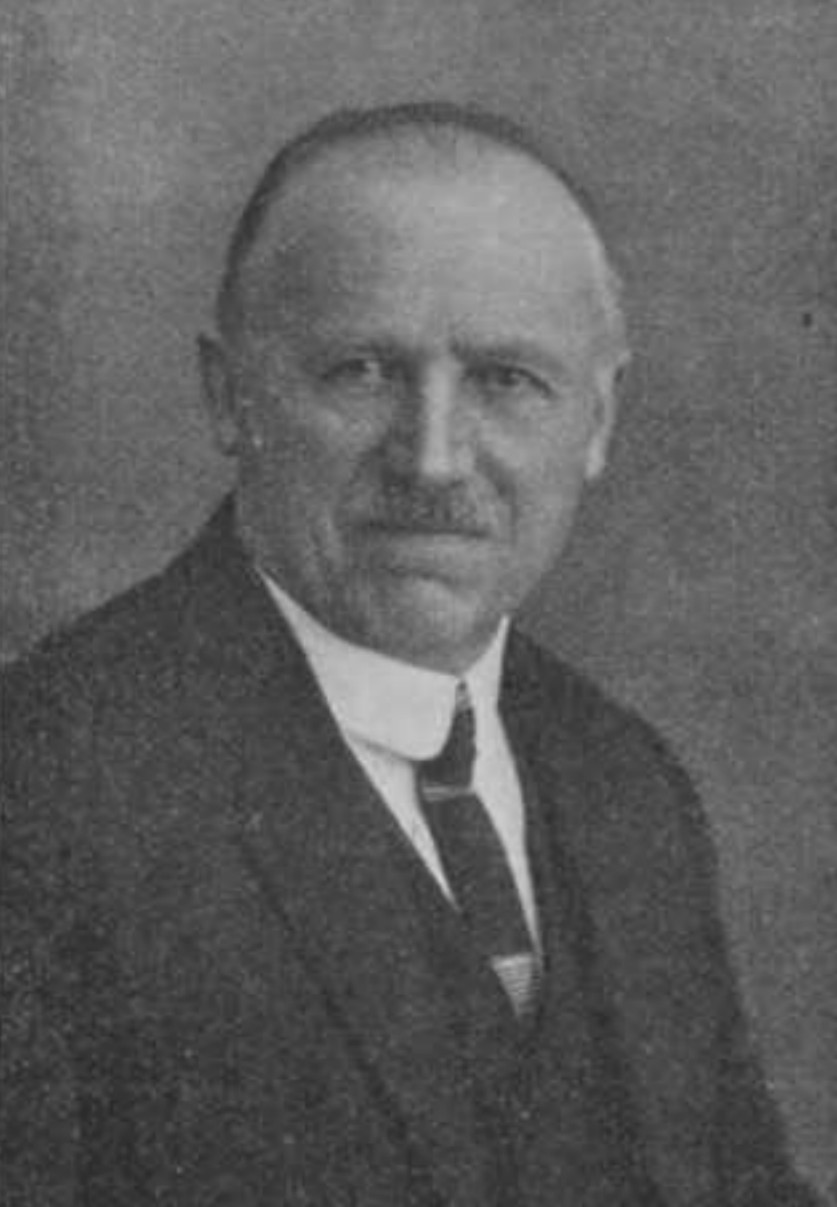
H.J.J. Eichelsheim

Henri Johannes Jacobus Eichelsheim (30 September 1865 – 6 May 1933) was a Dutch trade unionist.

Born in The Hague, he grew up in Rotterdam. When he was ten years old, he began working in a cigar factory. In 1885, he joined the Social Democratic League, and the Rotterdam Cigar Makers' Union, becoming its secretary in 1887. He negotiated a merger between it and the Amsterdam Cigar Makers' Union, forming the Dutch Cigar Makers' and Tobacco Workers' Union (ANBT). He served on its executive, and became known as a strong speaker.

Eichelsheim attended the 1896 Congress of the Socialist International, and although initially walking out in protest at its support for parliamentary activity, he was won around, and soon joined the Social Democratic Workers' Party (SDAP). However, he was often out of work due to his activism, trying to find employment under a pseudonym, and eventually starting his own tobacco factory, with the support of the ANBT. In 1904, he became the union's vice president.

Eichelsheim supported the formation of the Dutch Confederation of Trade Unions (NVV) in 1906, and that year also began working full-time for the ANBT. In 1914, he became its president. After World War I, he was involved in re-establishing the International Federation of Tobacco Workers, and was elected as its president. He retired from the ANBT in 1930, and the international in 1931, dying two years later.

Trade union offices
Preceded by Henri Bruens	President of the Dutch Cigar Makers' and Tobacco Workers' Union; 1914–1930	Succeeded by Willem van der Hoeve?
Preceded by Karl Deichmann	General Secretary of the International Federation of Tobacco Workers; 1919–1931	Succeeded by Ferdinand Husung
