= General Dutch Industrial Union of the Tobacco Industry =

Dutch trade union

The General Dutch Industrial Union of the Tobacco Industry (Dutch: Algemene Nederlandse Bedrijfsbond voor de Tabakverwerking Industrie, ANBTI) was a trade union representing workers involved in making tobacco products in the Netherlands.

A Dutch Cigar Makers' Union was founded in 1871, but it dissolved two years later following an unsuccessful strike. New, local, unions of tobacco workers were established, and on 25 December 1887, they formed the Dutch Cigar Makers' and Tobacco Workers' Union. Originally based in Amsterdam, it relocated its headquarters to Rotterdam in 1894.

In 1893, the union was a founding affiliate of the National Labour Secretariat, but it was expelled in 1900, because it would not hand over voluntary strike contributions. In 1906, it was a founder of the Dutch Confederation of Trade Unions (NVV). Following a major strike in 1913, the union achieved a national wage scheme.

From the 1930s, mechanisation led to job loses in the industry. The union campaigned for a law against the use of machinery, attracting the support of small employers who were unable to invest in it, but the campaign was unsuccessful.

In 1953, the NVV rearranged its affiliates as industrial unions, the union thereafter also organising administrative staff in the industry, and becoming the ANBTI. However, its membership continued declining. By the end of 1968, it had only 2,269 members, and on 1 January 1969, it merged into the General Union of Miscellaneous Industries.

== Presidents ==
1901: Henri Bruens
1914: Harry Eichelsheim
1931: Willem van der Hoeve?
1940s: T. Beerens
1950s: G. H. Gorter
1960s: G. van Dolder
