= Federation of Tobacco and Matches =

Trade union of France

The Federation of Tobacco and Matches (French: Fédération des Tabacs et Allumettes) was a trade union representing workers in the tobacco industry in France.

The union was founded in December 1890, as the National Federation of Workers of the Tobacco Manufactures of France, bringing together workers at fifteen factories. By 1895, it was able to launch a regular newspaper, L'Écho des tabacs, and was a founding affiliate of the General Confederation of Labour (CGT).

The union split in 1920, with the left-wing forming the Unitary Federation of Tobacco, affiliated to the United General Confederation of Labor (CGTU). In 1926, the Federation of Match Manufacturing Workers joined the CGT union, which renamed itself as the Federation of Tobacco and Matches, and this brought Léon Jouhaux into membership. The CGTU union rejoined in 1935, but its members failed to win any seats on the executive.

The union was banned during World War II, with none of its leadership collaborating with the Vichy regime. It was re-established after the war, but its leaders became increasingly uncomfortable with the influence of the French Communist Party in the CGT. In 1948, it resigned from the CGT, and became a founding constituent of Workers' Force.

Membership of the union gradually declined after the war, and in 1988, it merged into the General Federation of Agriculture, Food, Tobacco and Related Services Workers.

== General Secretaries ==
1899: Moritz
1902:
1928: Marcelle Delabit
1962: Lucien Trichard
1964: Georges Barbier
1968: Jacques Faure
1985: Daniel Dreux
