= Bodenfelde station =

Railway station in Bodenfelde, Germany

Bodenfelde
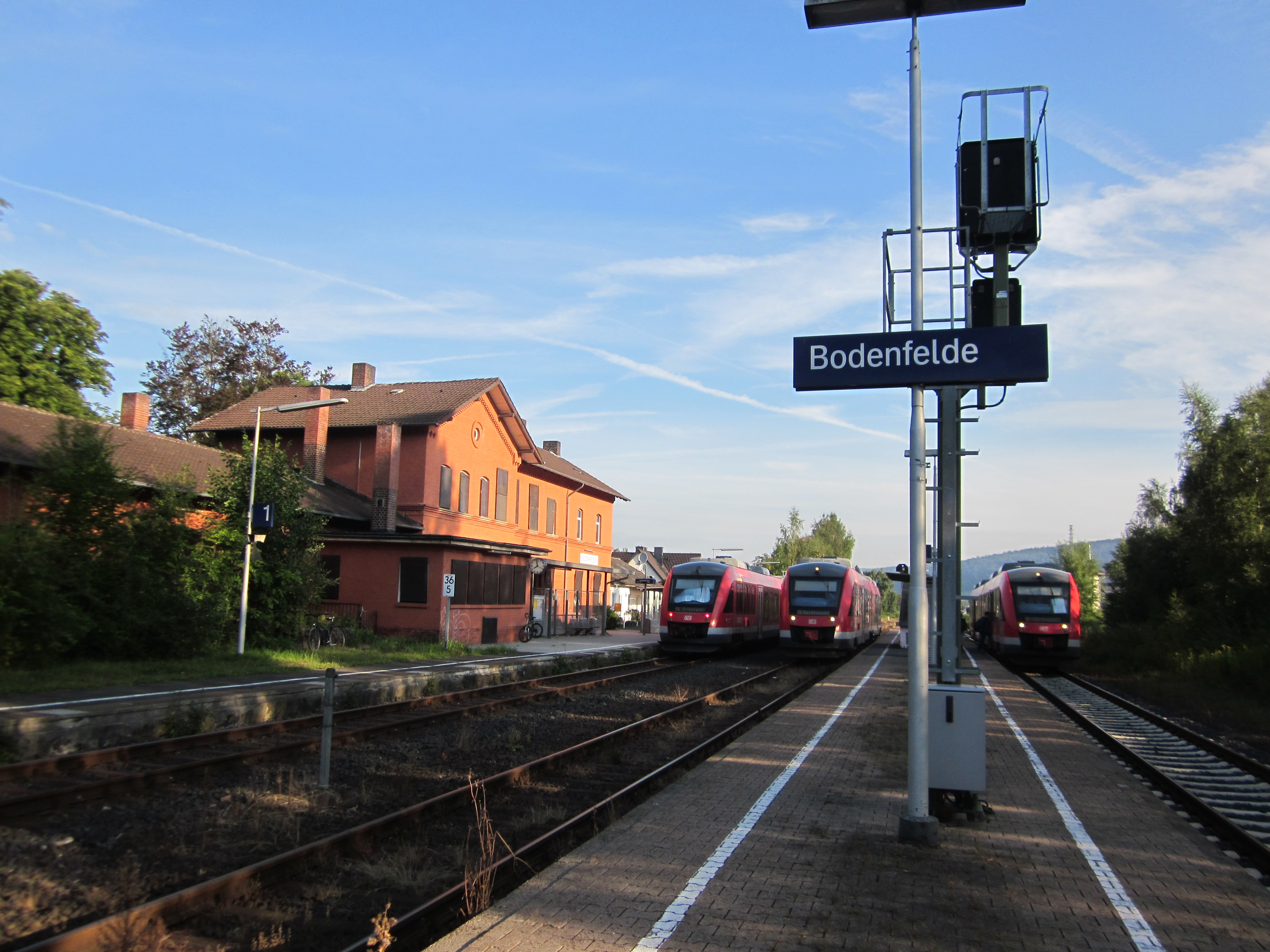
- 2013

General information
- Location: Bahnhofstraße 13; 37194 Bodenfelde; Lower Saxony, Germany
- Coordinates: 51.63698°N 9.56155°E
- Owner: DB Netz
- Operator: DB Station&Service
- Lines: Sollingbahn; Oberweserbahn
- Platforms: 1 island platform 1 side platform
- Tracks: 3
- Train operators: DB Regio Nord; NordWestBahn

Other information
- Station code: 738
- DS100 code: HBOF
- IBNR: 8001050
- Category: 6
- Fare zone: VSN: 440
- Website: www.bahnhof.de

Services
Preceding station	DB Regio Nord	Following station
Terminus	RB 81	Uslar towards Nordhausen
Preceding station	NordWestBahn	Following station
Bad Karlshafen towards Höxter-Ottbergen	RB 85	Vernawahlshausen towards Göttingen
Location
- Location within Lower Saxony

Bodenfelde (German: Bahnhof Bodenfelde) is a railway station located in Bodenfelde, Germany. The station is located on the Sollingbahn and Oberweserbahn. The train services are operated by NordWestBahn and Deutsche Bahn.

== Train services ==
The station is served by the following services:

- Local services RB 81 Bodenfelde – Northeim
- Local services RB 85 Ottbergen – Bad Karlshafen – Bodenfelde – Göttingen
