= Bad Karlshafen =

- Town
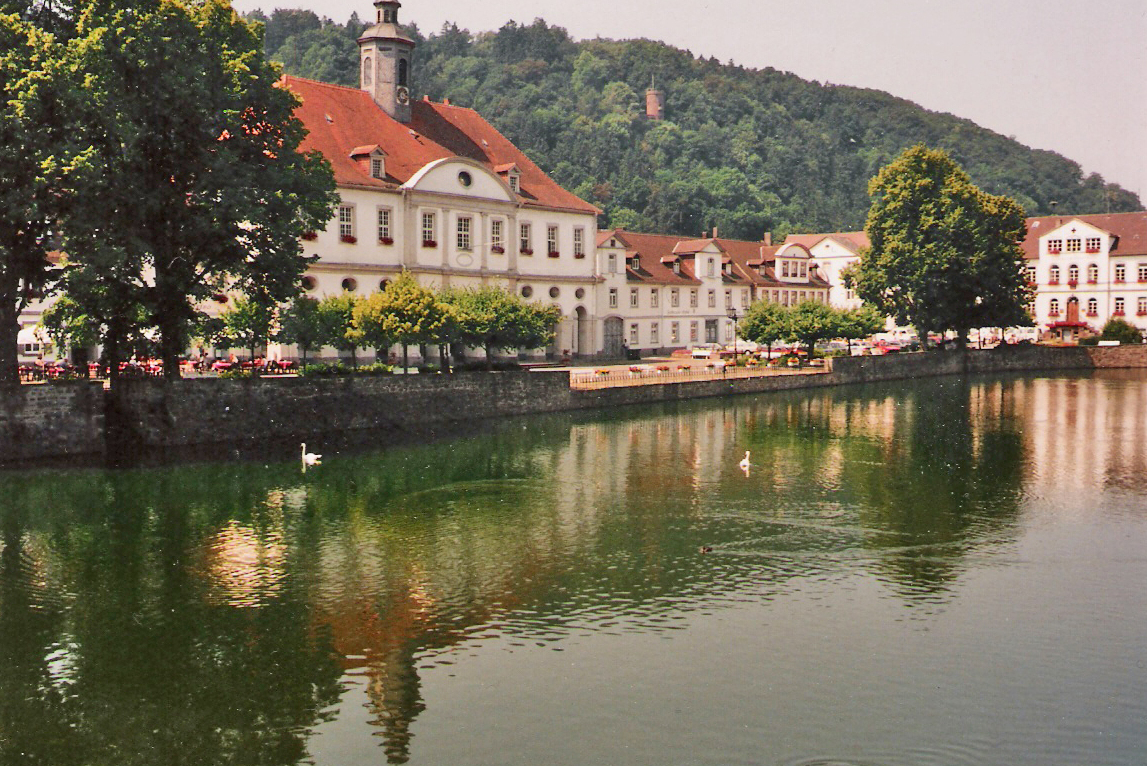
- Bad Karlshafen

- Coat of arms

- Location of Bad Karlshafen within Kassel district
- Interactive map of Bad Karlshafen
- Location within Germany Location within Hesse
- Coordinates: 51°38′N 09°27′E
- Country: Germany
- State: Hesse
- Admin. region: Kassel
- District: Kassel

Government
  - Mayor (2023–29): Marcus Dittrich (Ind.)

Area
  - Total: 14.85 km^{2} (5.73 sq mi)
- Elevation: 151 m (495 ft)

Population (2025-12-31)
  - Total: 3,328
  - Density: 224.1/km^{2} (580.4/sq mi)
- Time zone: UTC+01:00 (CET)
  - Summer (DST): UTC+02:00 (CEST)
- Postal codes: 34385
- Dialling codes: 05672
- Vehicle registration: KS
- Website: www.bad-karlshafen.de

Bad Karlshafen (German pronunciation: [baːt kaʁlsˈhaːfn̩]) is a baroque, thermal salt spa town in the district of Kassel, in Hesse, Germany. It has 2300 inhabitants in the main ward of Bad Karlshafen, and a further 1900 in the medieval village of Helmarshausen. It is situated at the confluence of the Diemel and Weser rivers, 15 km south of Höxter, and 37 km north of Kassel. In the town is a tripoint where three states meet: Hesse, Lower Saxony and North Rhine-Westphalia.

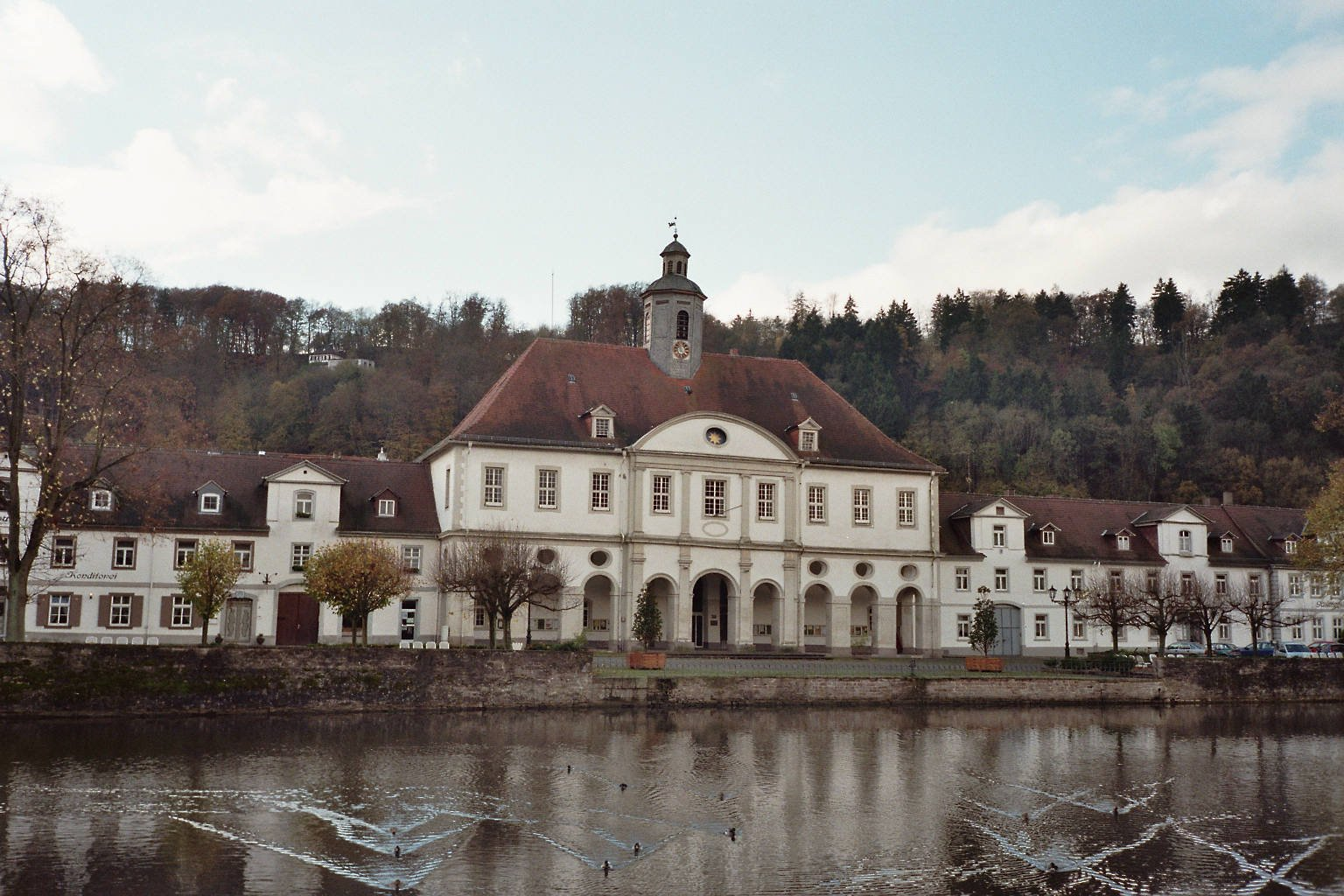
The city hall of Bad Karlshafen in Hessen, Germany

== History ==
The town was founded in 1699 by French Huguenots fleeing persecution in France. Though initially named Sieburg, the town was later named after Charles I, Landgrave of Hesse-Kassel, who granted them refuge. The German Huguenot Museum located here contains a picture archive, library, and family histories of the Huguenots in Germany. Charles I, Landgrave of Hesse-Kassel, had ambitious plans for town-planning and developing new water trade channels in the region; including a 'haven' in Karlshafen. Together with his engineer and architect Friedrich Conradi he developed plans for a Landgrave-Carl-Canal in order to avoid customs duty at Hannoversch Münden, but these were never finalised. Plans for Bad Karlshafen, however, were partially completed in a baroque style by architect Paul du Ry in 1717 and the town was renamed as Carlshaven.

Between 1685 and 1750, hundreds of Waldensians from Northern Italian ethnic enclaves hailing from the Piedmont Valleys in the Kingdom of Savoy-Piedmont-Sardinia existed in Carlshaven. Following the Revocation of the Edict of Nantes in France in 1685, the Kingdom of Savoy-Piedmont-Sardinia followed suit along with their ally and banished its Waldensian population, during which time, many of these diasporic Northern Italians existed in "ghettoized" ethnic enclaves in Hesse Cassel.

Since 1977 Karlshafen has spa status, which is when it received the title 'Bad'.

== Mayor ==
Marcus Dittrich

== Leisure and health ==
Bad Karlshafen is a spa town (Bad = spa), which offers a modern health centre, the Weser Therme, based on a thermal salt spring, and in 1986 a graduation tower was established.

== Transport ==
- Bad Karlshafen railway station offers services between Ottbergen and Göttingen, at roughly a 2 hourly frequency, with bicycle space.
- Bus services also operate in the area.

== Sons and daughters of the town ==
- Hermann Suchier (1848–1914), linguist
- Georg Zülch (1870–1942), lawyer and politician ( DNVP)
- Günter Frankenberg, (born 1945), lawyer
- Wilhelm Hubweges (1905–1971), sculptor and painter
- Andreas Thiele (born 1980), actor
- Sebastian Schachten (born 1984), football player
