= Uslar =

- Town
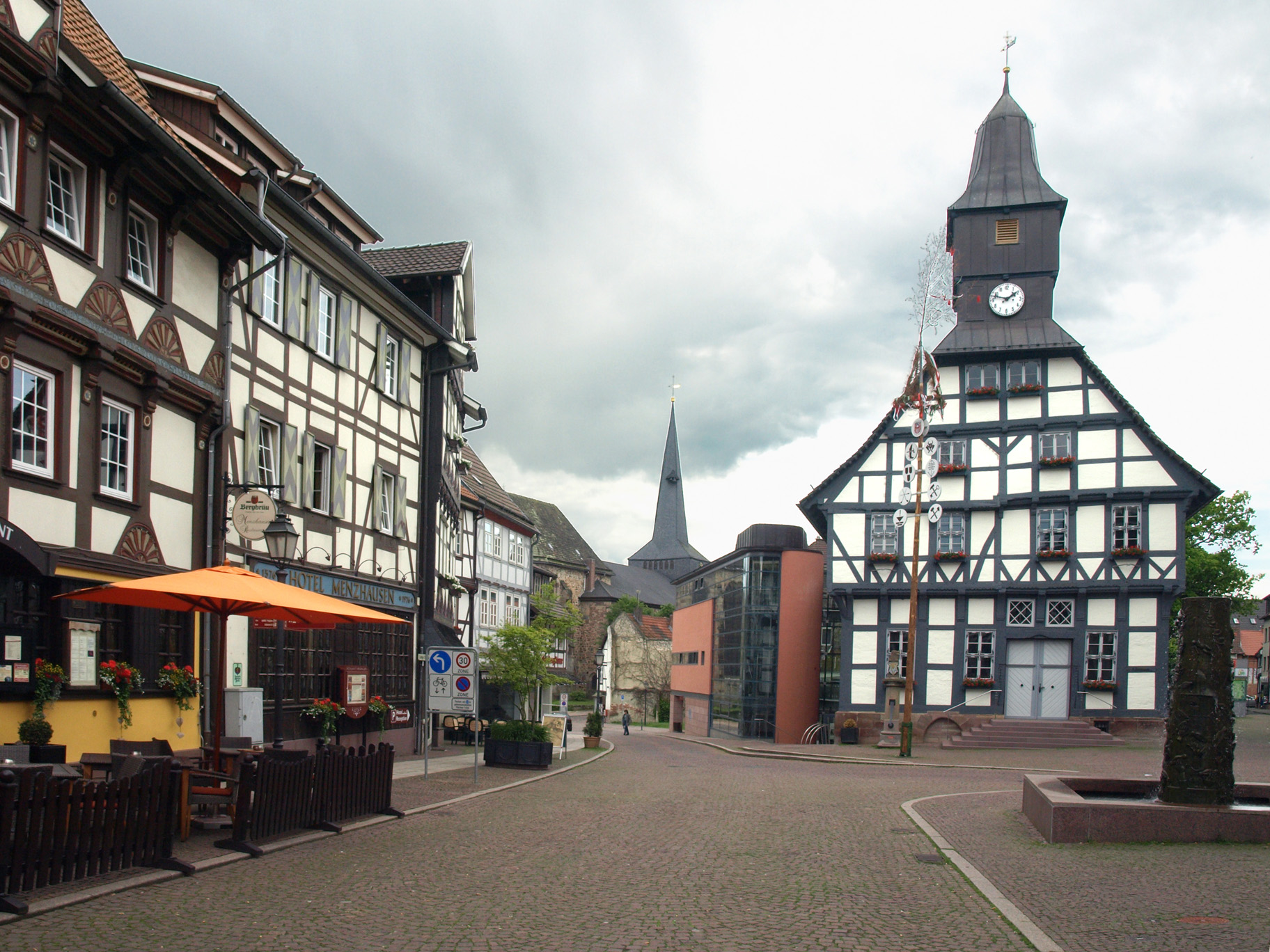

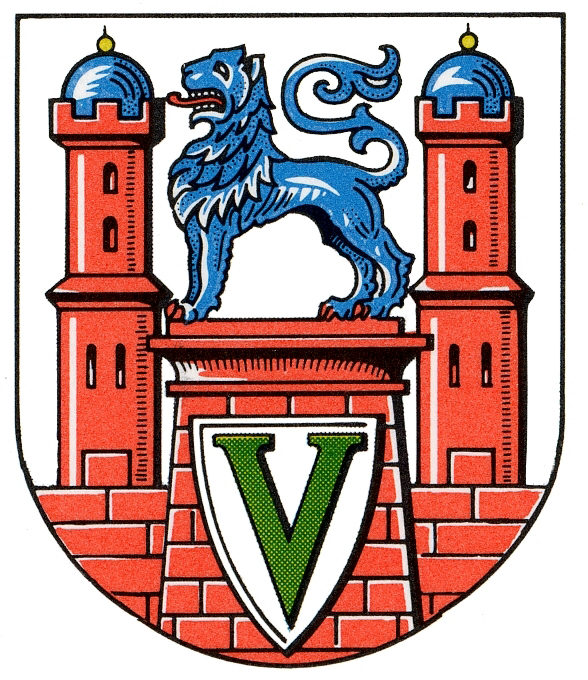
- Coat of arms

- Location of Uslar within Northeim district
- Interactive map of Uslar
- Location within Germany Location within Lower Saxony
- Coordinates: 51°39′35″N 9°38′09″E
- Country: Germany
- State: Lower Saxony
- District: Northeim
- Subdivisions: 19 districts

Government
  - Mayor (2020–25): Torsten Bauer (CDU)

Area
  - Total: 113.58 km^{2} (43.85 sq mi)
- Elevation: 178 m (584 ft)

Population (2025-12-31)
  - Total: 13,414
  - Density: 118.10/km^{2} (305.88/sq mi)
- Time zone: UTC+01:00 (CET)
  - Summer (DST): UTC+02:00 (CEST)
- Postal codes: 37170
- Dialling codes: 05571, 05573, 05506, 05574
- Vehicle registration: NOM
- Website: www.uslar.de

Uslar (German pronunciation: [ˈʊslaʁ]; Eastphalian: Üsseler) is a town and a municipality in southern Lower Saxony, Germany, in the south-western part of the district of Northeim, and in the south of the hills of Solling forest which are part of the Weser Uplands.

Uslar is located on the German Timber-Frame Road.

== Geography ==
Uslar lies close to the borders of Hesse and North Rhine-Westphalia. Hanover is 110 kilometres (68 miles) to the north, Hesse's biggest city Frankfurt am Main is 240 kilometres (149 miles) to the south, and Berlin is 350 kilometres (217 miles) to northeast.

=== Division of the municipality ===
The municipality of Uslar consists of 19 towns and villages: Ahlbershausen, Allershausen, Bollensen, Delliehausen, Dinkelhausen, Eschershausen, Fürstenhagen, Gierswalde, Kammerborn, Offensen, Schlarpe, Schönhagen, Schoningen, Sohlingen, Uslar, Vahle, Verliehausen, Volpriehausen and Wiensen.

== Transport ==
Uslar can be reached by car via the Landstraße (state's route) L554 from Göttingen. Through Uslar passes the Bundesstraße (federal route) B241 out of direction of Beverungen to Northeim. The closest Autobahns are the A7 (from Ausfahrt (Exit) Nörten-Hardenberg) and A44 (Ausfahrt Warburg). The nearest international airports are Hanover (IATA-Code: HAJ; ICAO EDDV), Paderborn-Lippstadt (IATA-Code: PAD) and Kassel-Calden. 1NM western the city center is a gliding airfield by the local soaring association LSV Solling e. V. Furthermore, Uslar can be reached by the Solling Railway via Northeim. From Göttingen, Uslar can be reached by bus route 210 direction Uslar, from Holzminden, bus route 510.

== History ==
Uslar was first mentioned in 1006/1007. In the second half of the 12th century, the Welfen-dynasty started to rule Uslar until the 19th century. In 1599, the castle of Freudenthal was built, which burned down in 1612. In 1819 big parts of the town of Uslar burned down.

== Economy and business ==
Uslar's industry uses the area's natural resources of wood, sand and water. In the 20th century, Uslar's furniture industry (Ilse-Möbel company, approx. 2000 employees in the 1950s) was world-famous. Nowadays, only tourism plays an important role in the area of Uslar (Uslarer Land). There is also the Privatbrauerei Haffner, which brews the Bergbräu family of beers, bottled in pop-top bottles much like Schleswig-Holstein's Flensburger beer and Holland's Grolsch.

The municipality Uslar is highly indebted. For example, the local swimming pool had to close in May 2011 and could only be re-opened in November 2012, with the help of a local initiative. Since 2005 the population has been steadily decreasing, averaging at 168 people per year.

== International relations ==
Uslar's sister cities are:

- – Człuchów, Poland since 1999.

== Notable people ==
- Georg Ludwig Friedrich Laves (1788–1864), a German architect, civil engineer and urban planner.
- Karl Deichmann (1863–1940), a German trade unionist and politician.
