= Höxter-Ottbergen station =

Railway station in Höxter, Germany

Höxter Ottbergen
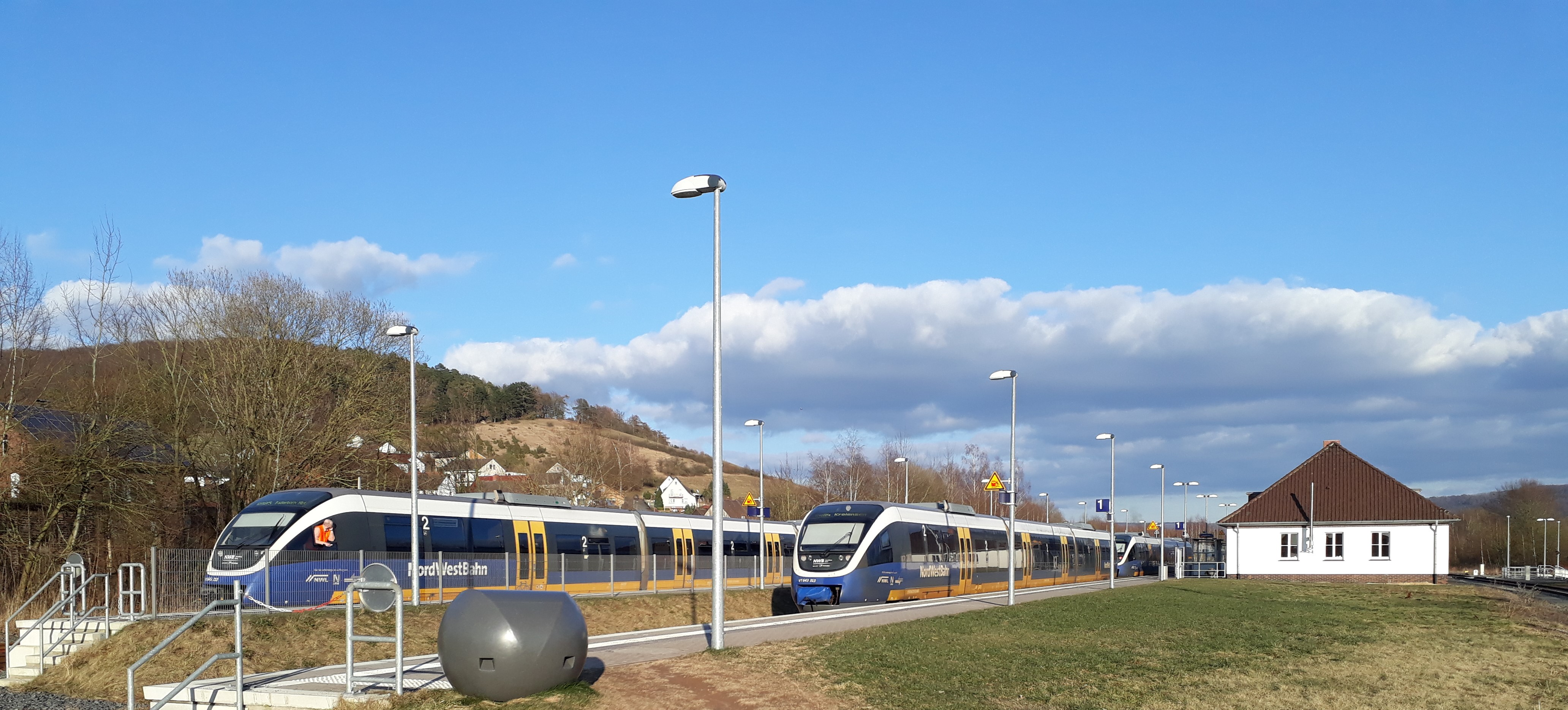
- Höxter-Ottbergen station

General information
- Location: Bahnhofstr. 19, Ottbergen, NRW; Germany
- Coordinates: 51°42′39″N 9°18′22″E
- Owner: DB Netz
- Operator: DB Station&Service
- Lines: Altenbeken–Kreiensen (km 31.6) (KBS 403); Höxter–Northeim (km 0.0) (KBS 356)
- Platforms: 3 side platforms
- Tracks: 4
- Train operators: NordWestBahn

Construction
- Accessible: Yes

Other information
- Station code: 4820
- DS100 code: HOTT
- IBNR: 8000213
- Category: 6
- Fare zone: Westfalentarif: 77857
- Website: www.bahnhof.de

History
- Opened: 1864

Services
| Preceding station | NordWestBahn | Following station |
|---|---|---|
| Brakel towards Paderborn Hbf | RB 84 | Godelheim towards Kreiensen |
| Terminus | RB 85 | Wehrden towards Göttingen |
Location
- Location within North Rhine-Westphalia

Höxter-Ottbergen is a railway station located in Ottbergen, Germany. The station is located on the Altenbeken–Kreiensen and the Solling railway lines. The train services are operated by NordWestBahn.

== Train services ==
In the 2026 timetable, the following services stop at the station. Trains run hourly on weekdays. The two services are coupled between Paderborn and Höxter-Ottbergen.

- Local services RB 84 Paderborn - Altenbegen - Höxter-Ottbergen - Holzminden - Kreiensen
- Local services RB 85 Höxter-Ottbergen – Bad Karlshafen – Bodenfelde – Göttingen
