= Hesepe station =

Railway station in Lower Saxony, Germany

Hesepe

General information
- Location: Hesepe, Lower Saxony; Germany
- Coordinates: 52.43939°N 7.96752°E
- Lines: Oldenburg–Osnabrück railway Delmenhorst–Hesepe railway
- Platforms: 2
- Tracks: 2

Services
Preceding station	NordWestBahn	Following station
Bersenbrück towards Wilhelmshaven	RE 18 Limited services	Bramsche towards Osnabrück Hbf
Rieste towards Bremen Hbf	RB 58	Bramsche towards Osnabrück Hbf
Location

Hesepe is a railway station located in Hesepe, Germany. The station is located on the Oldenburg–Osnabrück railway and Delmenhorst–Hesepe railway. The train services are operated by NordWestBahn.

== Train services ==
The station is served by the following services:

Line	Route	Interval	Operator	Rolling stock
RE 18	Wilhelmshaven – Oldenburg – Cloppenburg – Quakenbrück – Hesepe – Osnabrück Altstadt – Osnabrück	Some trains	NordWestBahn	Lint 41
RB 58	Bremen – Delmenhorst – Vechta – Neuenkirchen – Hesepe – Osnabrück Altstadt – Osnabrück	60 min	NordWestBahn	Lint 41
