= Achmer station =

Railway station in Germany

Achmer
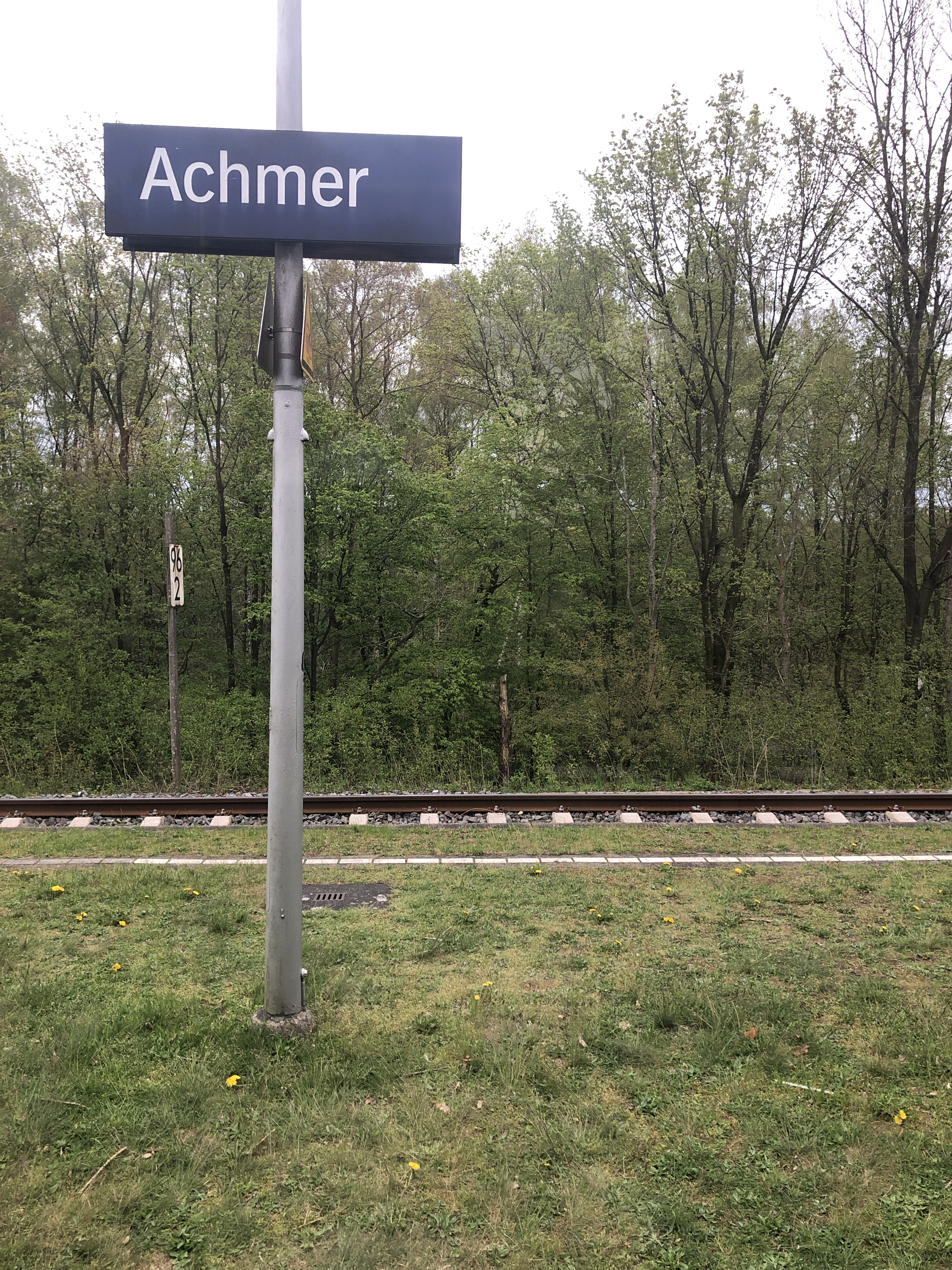
- Achmer railway station

General information
- Location: Achmer, Lower Saxony; Germany
- Coordinates: 52.39066°N 7.94199°E
- Line: Oldenburg–Osnabrück railway
- Platforms: 2
- Tracks: 2

Other information
- Fare zone: VOS: 644 (buses only)

Services
Preceding station	NordWestBahn	Following station
Bramsche towards Wilhelmshaven	RE 18 Peak-time services	Halen towards Osnabrück Hbf
Bramsche towards Bremen Hbf	RB 58	Halen towards Osnabrück Hbf
Location

Achmer is a railway station located in Achmer, Germany. The station is located on the Oldenburg–Osnabrück railway and the train services are operated by NordWestBahn.

== Train services ==
The station is served by the following services:

Line	Route	Interval	Operator	Rolling stock
RE 18	Wilhelmshaven – Oldenburg – Cloppenburg – Quakenbrück – Achmer – Osnabrück Altstadt – Osnabrück	Some trains	NordWestBahn	Lint 41
RB 58	Bremen – Delmenhorst – Vechta – Neuenkirchen – Achmer – Osnabrück Altstadt – Osnabrück	60 min	NordWestBahn	Lint 41
