= Bramsche station =

Railway station in Bramsche, Germany

Bramsche
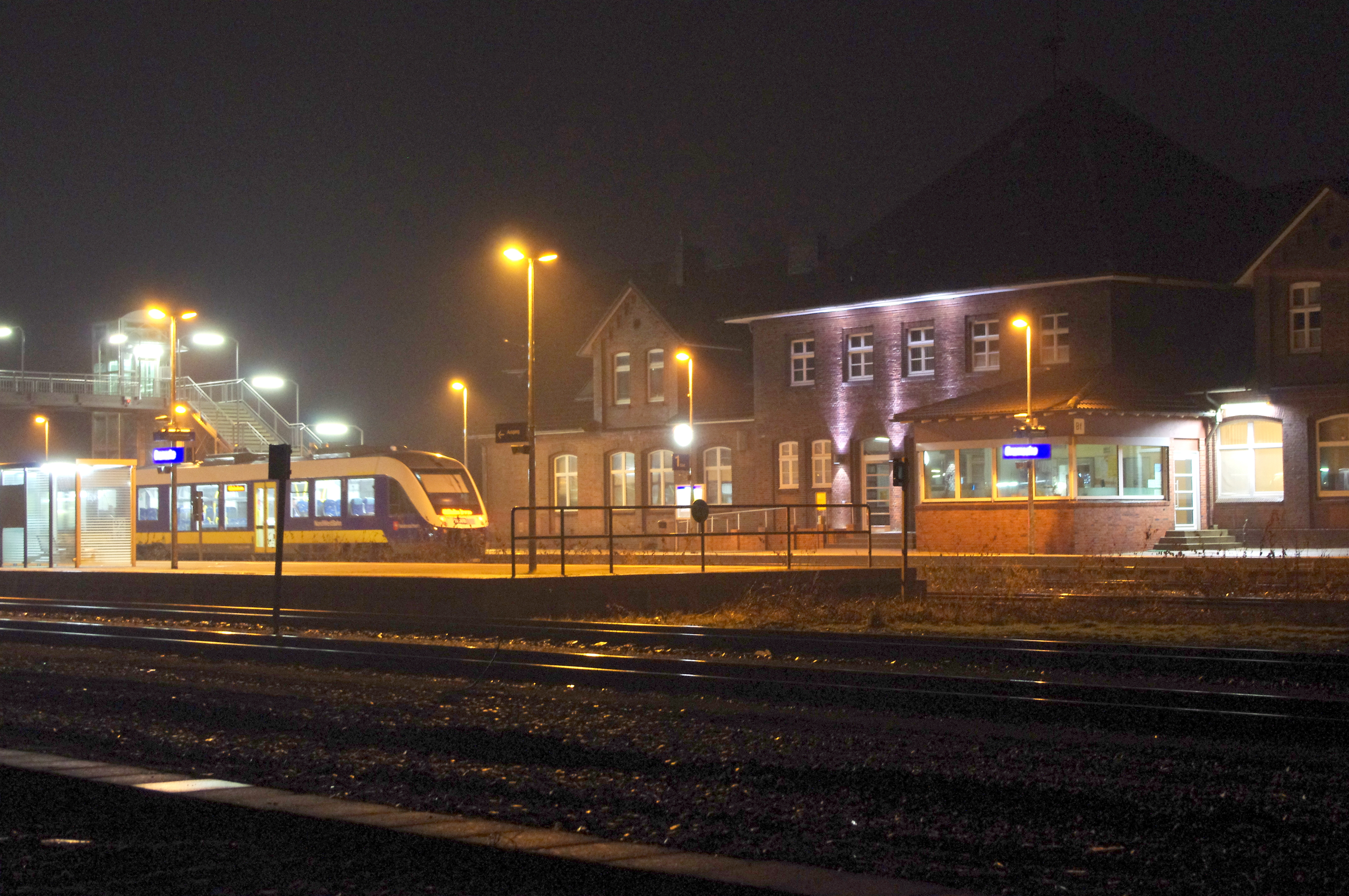
- Bramsche railway station

General information
- Location: Bramsche, Lower Saxony; Germany
- Coordinates: 52.41096°N 7.97493°E
- Line: Oldenburg–Osnabrück railway
- Platforms: 3
- Tracks: 5

Other information
- Fare zone: VOS: 640 (buses only)

Services
Preceding station	NordWestBahn	Following station
Bersenbrück towards Wilhelmshaven	RE 18	Osnabrück Altstadt towards Osnabrück Hbf
Hesepe towards Bremen Hbf	RB 58	Achmer towards Osnabrück Hbf
Bersenbrück towards Esens(Ostfriesl)	RB 59 Limited service	Osnabrück Altstadt One-way operation
Location

Bramsche is a railway station located in Bramsche, Germany. The station is located on the Oldenburg–Osnabrück railway and the train services are operated by NordWestBahn.

== Train services ==
The station is served by the following services:

Line	Route	Interval	Operator	Rolling stock
RE 18	Wilhelmshaven – Oldenburg – Cloppenburg – Quakenbrück – Bramsche – Osnabrück Altstadt – Osnabrück	60 min	NordWestBahn	Lint 41
RB 58	Bremen – Delmenhorst – Vechta – Neuenkirchen – Bramsche – Osnabrück Altstadt – Osnabrück	60 min	NordWestBahn	Lint 41
RB 59	Esens – Oldenburg – Cloppenburg – Quakenbrück – Bramsche – Osnabrück Altstadt – Osnabrück	1 train Sa	NordWestBahn	Lint 41
