= Halen station =

Railway station in Lotte, Germany

Halen
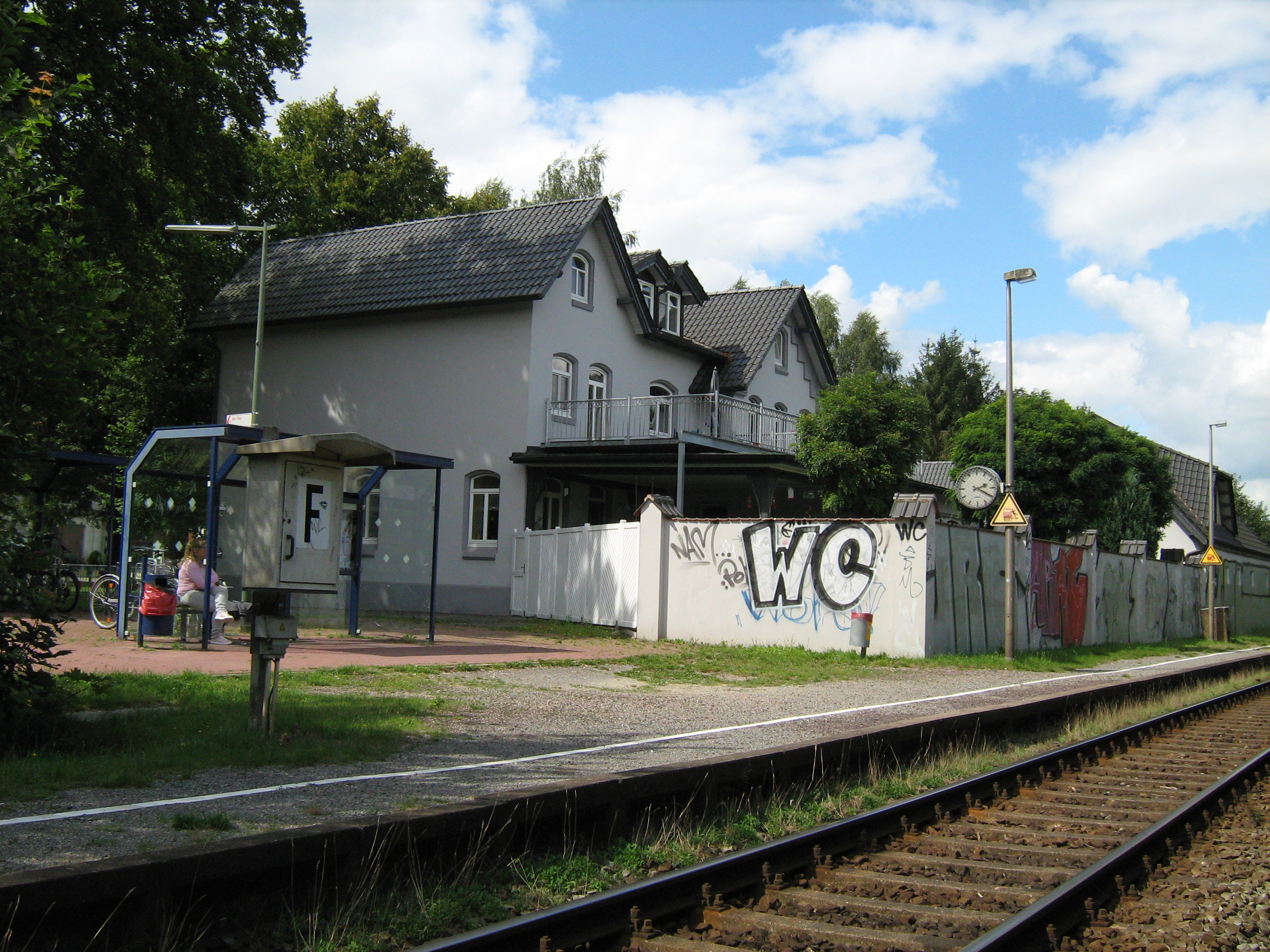
- Halen railway station

General information
- Location: Halen, Northrhine Westfalia; Germany
- Coordinates: 52.33924°N 7.94504°E
- System: Bf
- Line: Bremen–Hanover railway
- Platforms: 1
- Tracks: 1

Other information
- Fare zone: Westfalentarif: 51063

Services
Preceding station	NordWestBahn	Following station
Achmer towards Wilhelmshaven	RE 18 Peak-time services	Osnabrück Altstadt towards Osnabrück Hbf
Achmer towards Bremen Hbf	RB 58	Osnabrück Altstadt towards Osnabrück Hbf
Location

Halen is a railway station located in Halen, Germany. The station is located on the Oldenburg–Osnabrück railway and the train services are operated by NordWestBahn.

== Train services ==
The station is served by the following services:

Line	Route	Interval	Operator	Rolling stock
RE 18	Wilhelmshaven – Oldenburg – Cloppenburg – Quakenbrück – Halen – Osnabrück Altstadt – Osnabrück	Some trains	NordWestBahn	Lint 41
RB 58	Bremen – Delmenhorst – Vechta – Neuenkirchen – Halen – Osnabrück Altstadt – Osnabrück	60 min	NordWestBahn	Lint 41
