= Osnabrück Altstadt station =

Railway station in Osnabrück, Germany

Osnabrück Altstadt
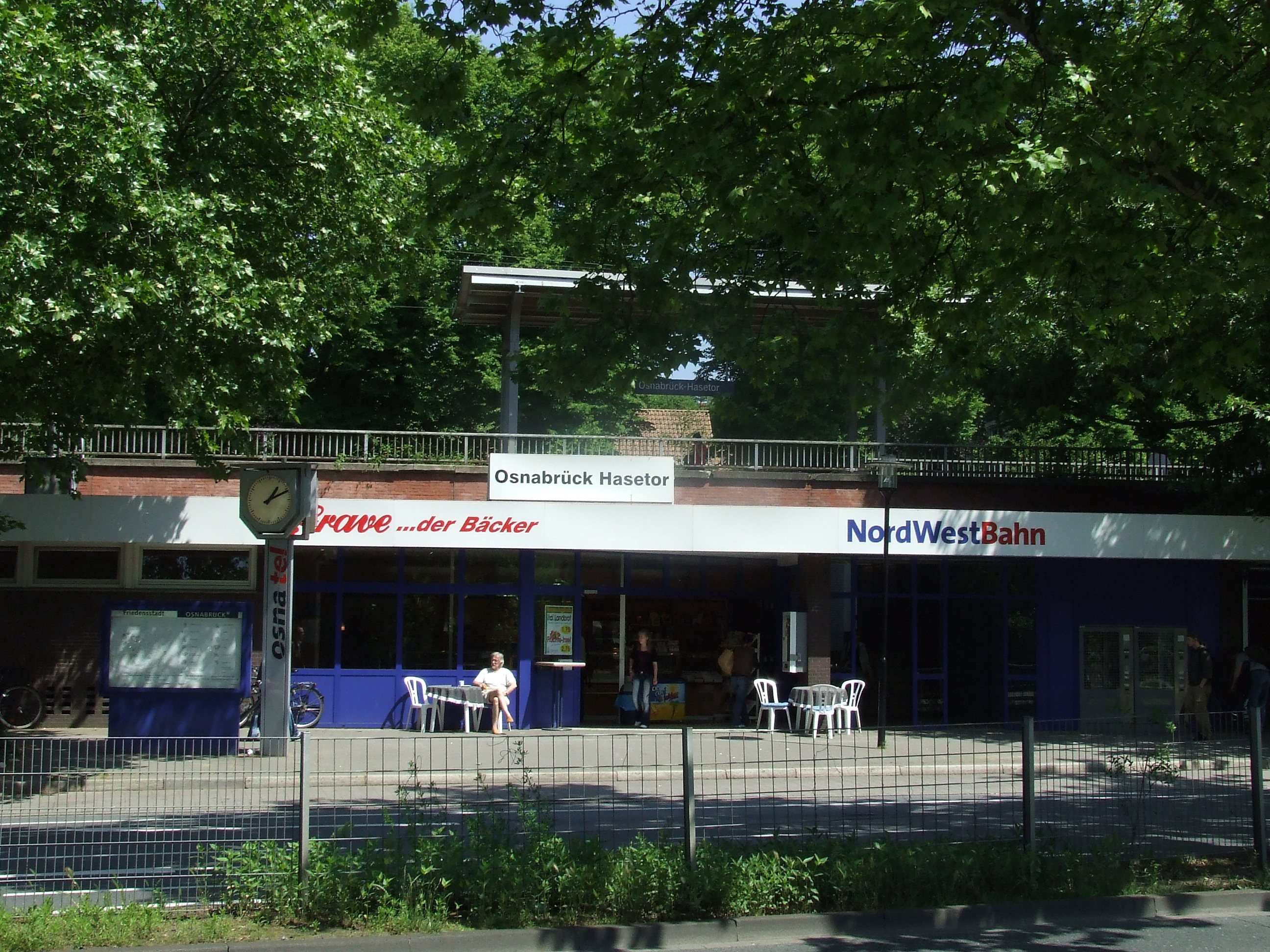
- Osnabrück Altstadt railway station

General information
- Location: Osnabrück, Lower Saxony; Germany
- Coordinates: 52.1652°N 8.0244°E
- Owner: Deutsche Bahn
- Operator: DB Station&Service
- Lines: Löhne–Rheine railway; Oldenburg–Osnabrück railway
- Platforms: 2
- Tracks: 3

Other information
- Station code: n/a
- Category: 5
- Fare zone: VOS: 100 (buses only); Westfalentarif: 91000 (VOS transitional tariff)
- Website: www.bahnhof.de

Services
Preceding station	NordWestBahn	Following station
Bramsche towards Wilhelmshaven	RE 18	Osnabrück Hbf Terminus
Halen towards Bremen Hbf	RB 58	Osnabrück Hbf Terminus
Bramsche towards Esens(Ostfriesl)	RB 59 Limited service	Osnabrück Hbf One-way operation
Preceding station		Following station
Ibbenbüren-Laggenbeck towards Rheine	RE 60	Osnabrück Hbf towards Braunschweig Hbf
Preceding station		Following station
Ibbenbüren-Laggenbeck towards Hengelo	RB 61	Osnabrück Hbf towards Bielefeld Hbf
Preceding station	DB Regio Nord	Following station
Ibbenbüren towards Rheine	RE 62	Osnabrück Hbf towards Löhne (Westfalen)
Location
- Location within Lower Saxony Location within Germany Location within Europe

Osnabrück Altstadt (formerly Osnabrück-Hasetor) is a railway station located in Osnabrück, Germany. The station is located on the Löhne–Rheine and the Oldenburg–Osnabrück lines. The train services are operated by Eurobahn, NordWestBahn, and WestfalenBahn.

== Train services ==
The station is served by the following services:

Line	Route	Interval	Operator	Rolling stock
RE 18	Wilhelmshaven – Oldenburg – Cloppenburg – Quakenbrück – Osnabrück Altstadt – Osnabrück	60 min	NordWestBahn	Lint 41
RE 60	Rheine – Osnabrück Altstadt – Osnabrück – Löhne – Minden – Hannover – Braunschweig	120 min	WestfalenBahn	Stadler Kiss
RE 62	Rheine – Osnabrück Altstadt – Osnabrück – Löhne	120 min	DB Regio Nord	Alstom Coradia Continental
RB 58	Bremen – Delmenhorst – Vechta – Neuenkirchen – Osnabrück Altstadt – Osnabrück	60 min	NordWestBahn	Lint 41
RB 59	Esens – Oldenburg – Cloppenburg – Quakenbrück – Osnabrück Altstadt – Osnabrück	1 train Sa	NordWestBahn	Lint 41
RB 61	Hengelo – Bad Bentheim – Rheine – Osnabrück Altstadt – Osnabrück – Bünde – Herford – Bielefeld	60 min	Eurobahn	Stadler Flirt 3
