= Lohne (Oldb) station =

Railway station in Lohne, Germany

Lohne (Oldb)
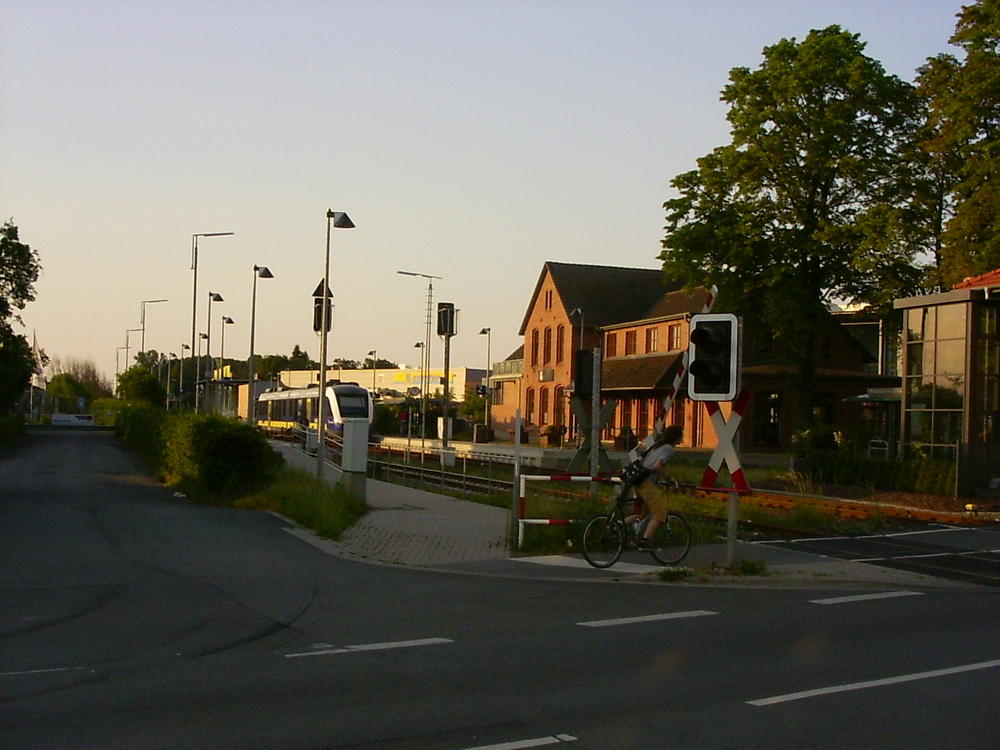
- Lohne railway station

General information
- Location: Lohne, Lower Saxony; Germany
- Coordinates: 52.6654°N 8.2293°E
- Line: Delmenhorst–Hesepe railway
- Platforms: 2
- Tracks: 2

Services
Preceding station	NordWestBahn	Following station
Mühlen (Oldb) towards Osnabrück Hbf	RB 58	Vechta towards Bremen Hbf
Location

Lohne (Oldb) is a railway station located in Lohne, Germany. The station is located on the Delmenhorst–Hesepe railway and the train services are operated by NordWestBahn.

== Train services ==
The station is served by the following services:

- Local services RB 58 Osnabrück - Bramsche - Vechta - Delmenhorst - Bremen
