= Brettorf station =

Railway station in Dötlingen, Germany

Brettorf
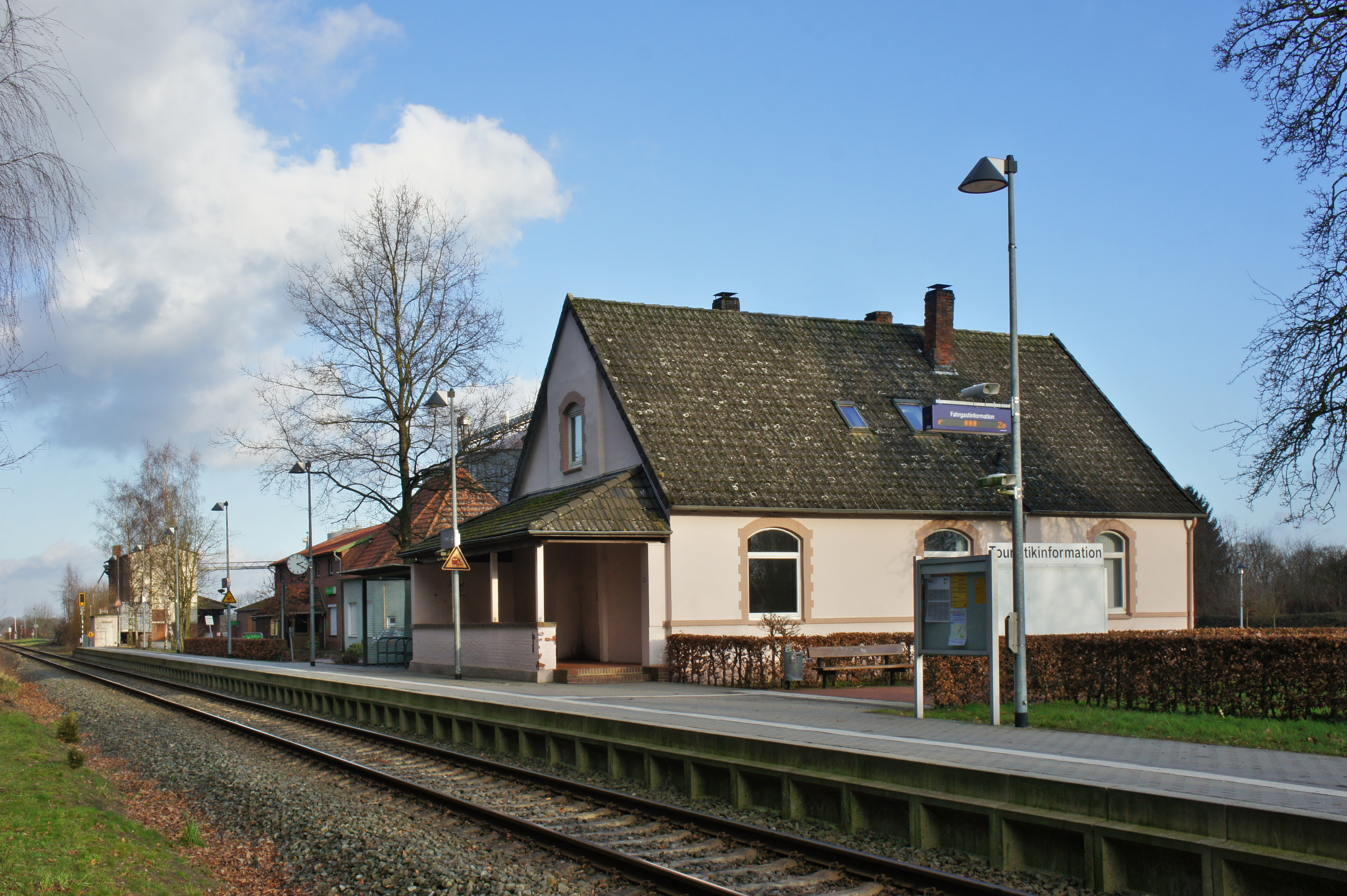
- Brettorf railway station in 2014

General information
- Location: Brettorf, Lower Saxony; Germany
- Coordinates: 52.5801°N 8.2650°E
- Line: Delmenhorst–Hesepe railway
- Platforms: 1
- Tracks: 1

Other information
- Fare zone: VBN: 620

Services
Preceding station	NordWestBahn	Following station
Wildeshausen towards Osnabrück Hbf	RB 58	Ganderkesee towards Bremen Hbf
Location

Brettorf is a railway station located in Brettorf, Germany. The station is located on the Delmenhorst–Hesepe railway and the train services are operated by NordWestBahn.

== Train services ==
The station is served by the following services:

- Local services RB 58 Osnabrück - Bramsche - Vechta - Delmenhorst - Bremen
