= Holdorf (Oldb) station =

Railway station in Holdorf, Germany

Holdorf (Oldb)
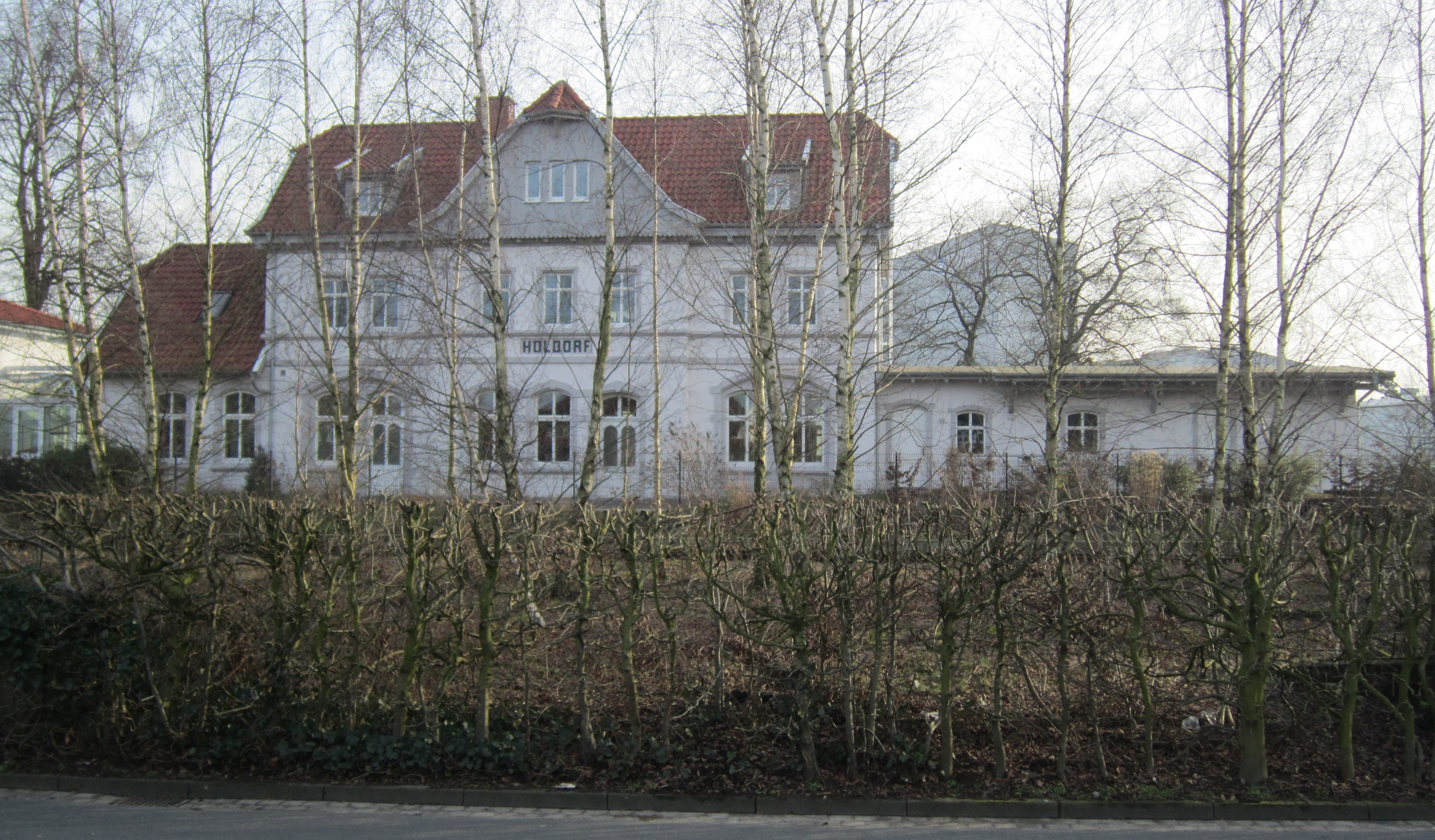
- Holdorf railway station

General information
- Location: Holdorf, Lower Saxony; Germany
- Coordinates: 52.57488°N 8.13837°E
- Line: Delmenhorst–Hesepe railway
- Platforms: 1
- Tracks: 1

Services
Preceding station	NordWestBahn	Following station
Neuenkirchen (Oldb) towards Osnabrück Hbf	RB 58	Steinfeld (Oldb) towards Bremen Hbf
Location

Holdorf (Oldb) is a railway station located in Holdorf, Germany. The station is located on the Delmenhorst–Hesepe railway and the train services are operated by NordWestBahn.

== Train services ==
The station is served by the following services:

- Local services RB 58 Osnabrück - Bramsche - Vechta - Delmenhorst - Bremen
