= Wildeshausen station =

Railway station in Wildeshausen, Germany

Wildeshausen
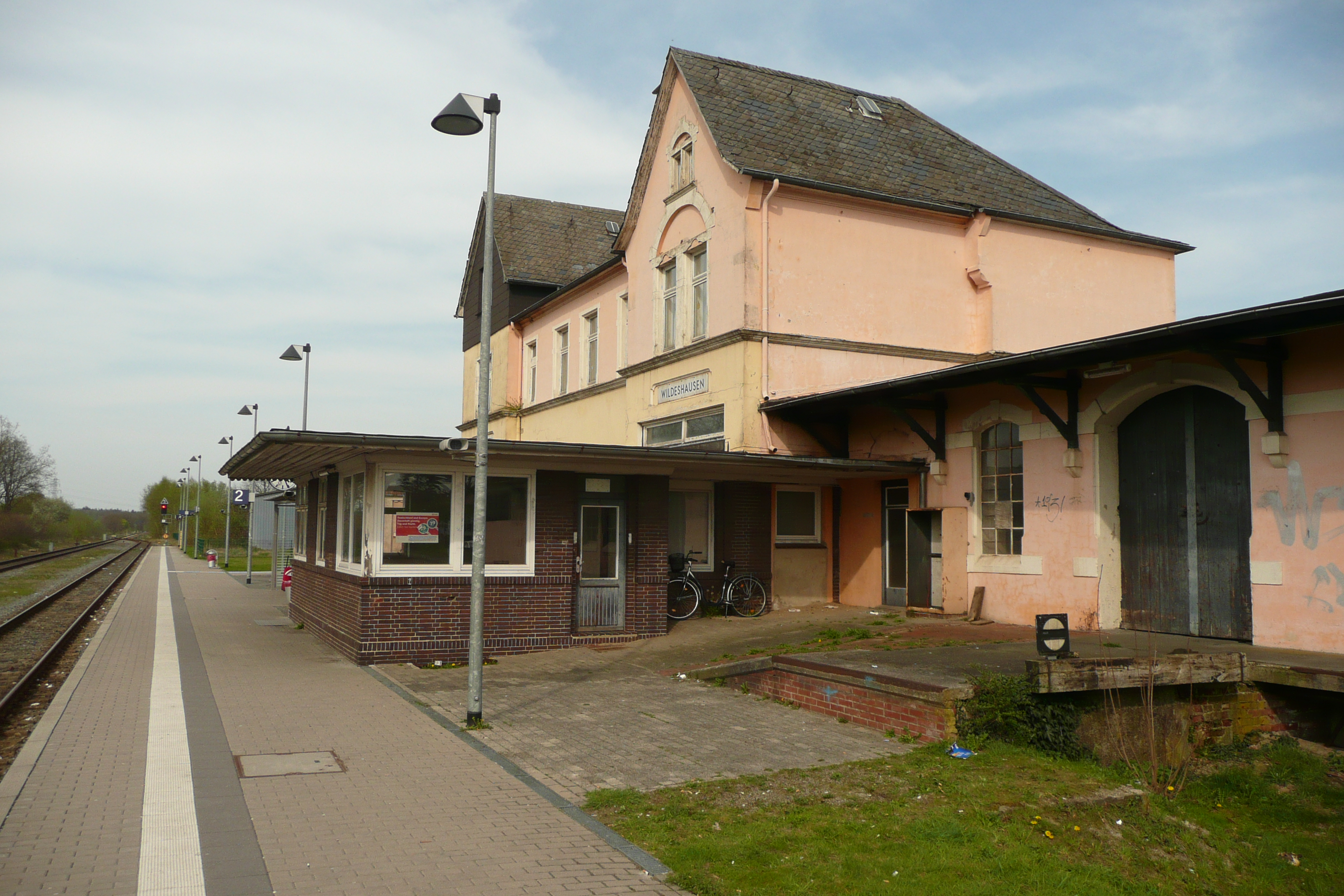
- Wildeshausen station in 2009

General information
- Location: Wildeshausen, Lower Saxony; Germany
- Coordinates: 52.8981°N 8.4318°E
- Line: Delmenhorst–Hesepe railway
- Platforms: 2
- Tracks: 2

Other information
- Fare zone: VBN: 630

Services
| Preceding station | NordWestBahn | Following station |
|---|---|---|
| Rechterfeld towards Osnabrück Hbf | RB 58 | Brettorf towards Bremen Hbf |
Location

Wildeshausen is a railway station located in Wildeshausen, Germany. The station is located on the Delmenhorst–Hesepe railway and the train services are operated by NordWestBahn.

== Train services ==
The station is served by the following services:

- Local services RB 58 Osnabrück - Bramsche - Vechta - Delmenhorst - Bremen
