= Mühlen (Oldb) station =

Railway station in Steinfeld, Germany

Mühlen (Oldb)

General information
- Location: Mühlen; Germany
- Coordinates: 52.61922°N 8.20838°E
- Line: Delmenhorst–Hesepe railway
- Platforms: 1
- Tracks: 1

Services
Preceding station	NordWestBahn	Following station
Steinfeld (Oldb) towards Osnabrück Hbf	RB 58	Lohne (Oldb) towards Bremen Hbf
Location

Mühlen (Oldb) is a railway station located in Mühlen, Germany. The station is located on the Delmenhorst–Hesepe railway and the train services are operated by NordWestBahn.

== Train services ==
The station is served by the following services:

- Local services RB 58 Osnabrück - Bramsche - Vechta - Delmenhorst - Bremen
