= Lutten station =

Railway station in Goldenstedt, Germany

Lutten
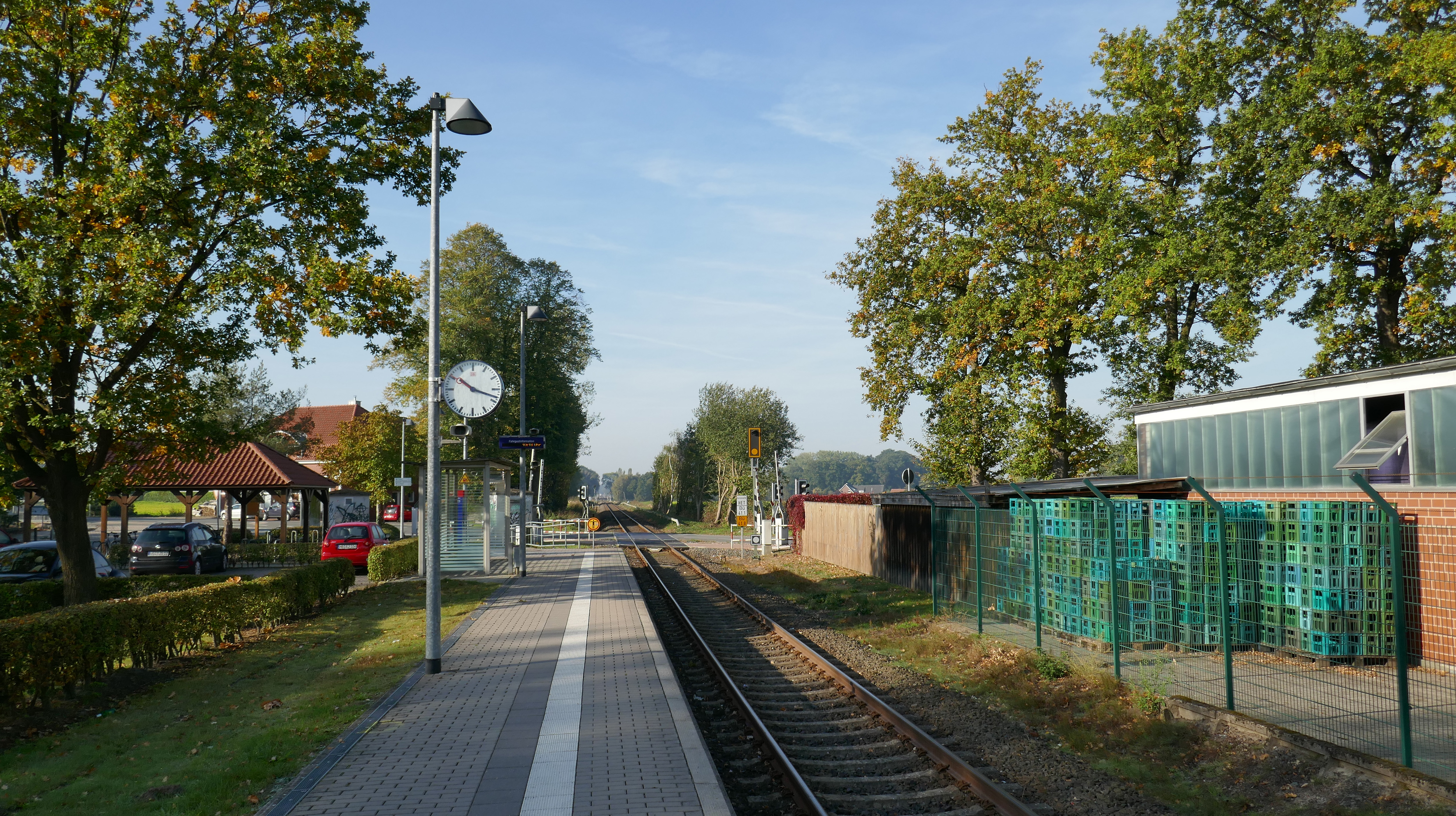
- Lutten railway station in 2018

General information
- Location: Lutten, Lower Saxony; Germany
- Coordinates: 52.767778°N 8.343333°E
- Line: Delmenhorst–Hesepe railway
- Platforms: 1
- Tracks: 1

Services
Preceding station	NordWestBahn	Following station
Vechta towards Osnabrück Hbf	RB 58	Goldenstedt (Oldb) towards Bremen Hbf
Location

Lutten is a railway station located in Lutten, Germany. The station is located on the Delmenhorst–Hesepe railway and the train services are operated by NordWestBahn.

== Train services ==
The station is served by the following services:

- Local services RB 58 Osnabrück — Bramsche — Vechta — Delmenhorst — Bremen
