= Steinfeld (Oldb) station =

Railway station in Steinfeld, Germany

Steinfeld (Oldb)

General information
- Location: Steinfeld (Oldenburg); Germany
- Coordinates: 52.59255°N 8.19791°E
- Line: Delmenhorst–Hesepe railway
- Platforms: 1
- Tracks: 1

Services
Preceding station	NordWestBahn	Following station
Holdorf (Oldb) towards Osnabrück Hbf	RB 58	Mühlen (Oldb) towards Bremen Hbf
Location

Steinfeld (Oldb) is a railway station located in Steinfeld, Lower Saxony, Germany. The station is located on the Delmenhorst–Hesepe railway and the train services are operated by NordWestBahn.

== Train services ==
The station is served by the following services:

- Local services RB 58 Osnabrück - Bramsche - Vechta - Delmenhorst - Bremen
