= Rieste station =

Railway station in Lower Saxony, Germany

Rieste
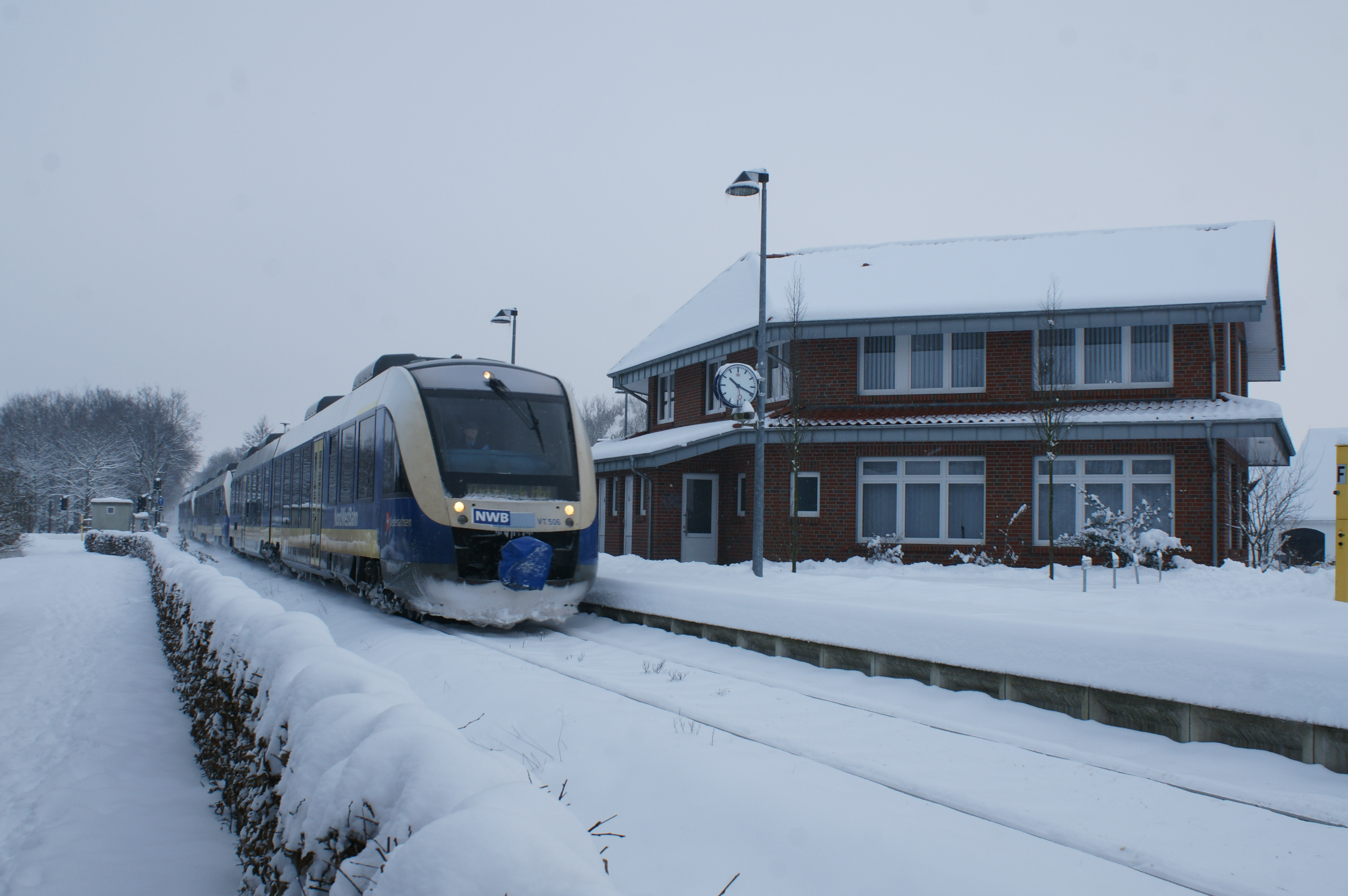
- Rieste station in 2010

General information
- Location: Rieste, Lower Saxony; Germany
- Coordinates: 52.48475°N 8.01044°E
- Line: Delmenhorst–Hesepe railway
- Platforms: 1
- Tracks: 1

Services
Preceding station	NordWestBahn	Following station
Hesepe towards Osnabrück Hbf	RB 58	Neuenkirchen (Oldb) towards Bremen Hbf
Location

Rieste is a railway station located in Rieste, Germany. The station is located on the Delmenhorst–Hesepe railway and the train services are operated by NordWestBahn.

== Train services ==
The station is served by the following services:

- Local services RB 58 Osnabrück - Bramsche - Vechta - Delmenhorst - Bremen
