= Goldenstedt (Oldb) station =

Railway station in Goldenstedt, Germany

Goldenstedt (Oldb)
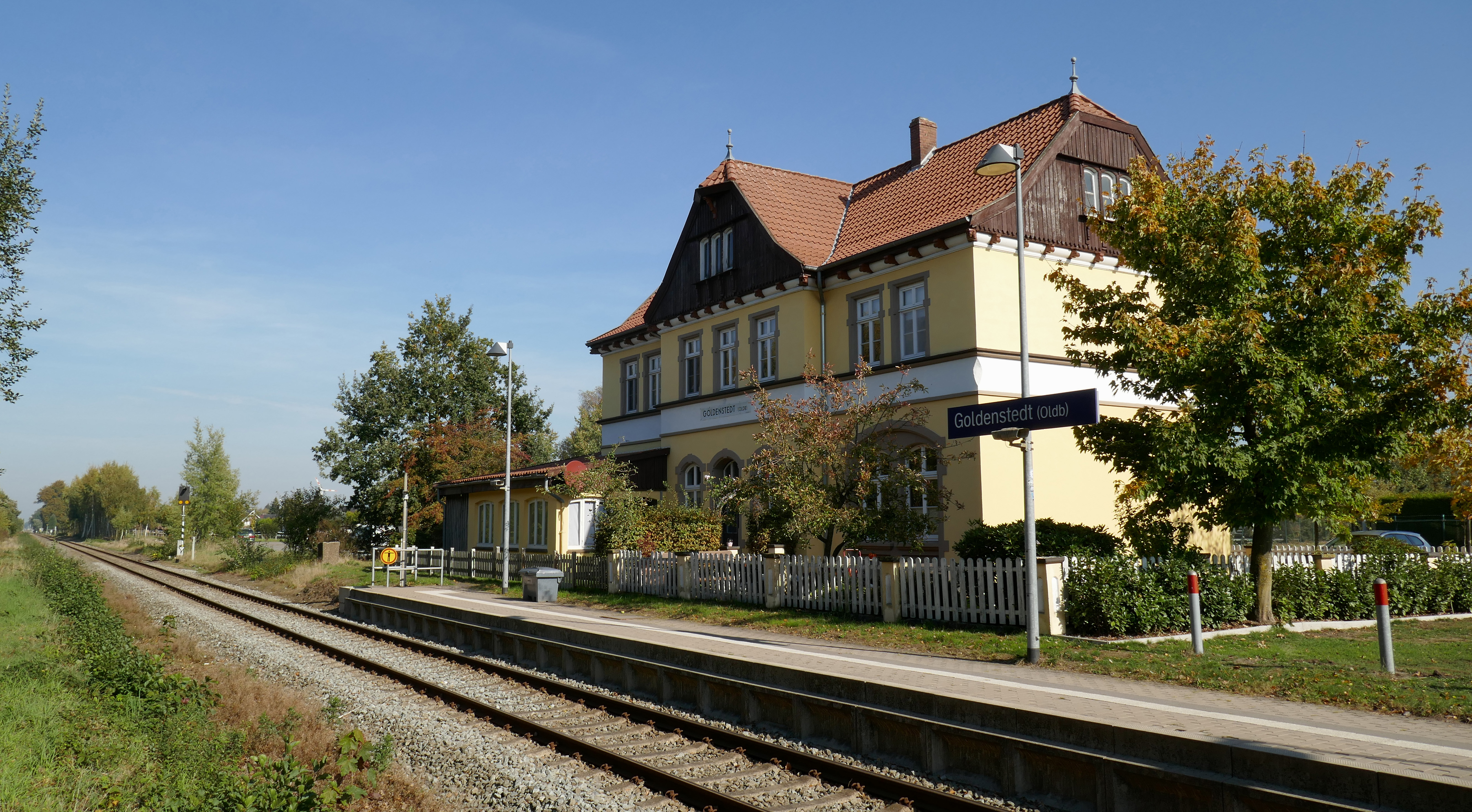
- Goldenstedt railway station

General information
- Location: Goldenstedt, Lower Saxony; Germany
- Coordinates: 52.8006°N 8.3944°E
- Line: Delmenhorst–Hesepe railway
- Platforms: 1
- Tracks: 1

Services
Preceding station	NordWestBahn	Following station
Lutten towards Osnabrück Hbf	RB 58	Rechterfeld towards Bremen Hbf
Location

Goldenstedt is a railway station located in Goldenstedt, Germany. The station is located on the Delmenhorst–Hesepe railway and the train services are operated by NordWestBahn.

== Train services ==
The station is served by the following services:

- Local services RB 58 Osnabrück - Bramsche - Vechta - Delmenhorst - Bremen
