= Rechterfeld station =

Railway station in Visbek, Germany

Rechterfeld
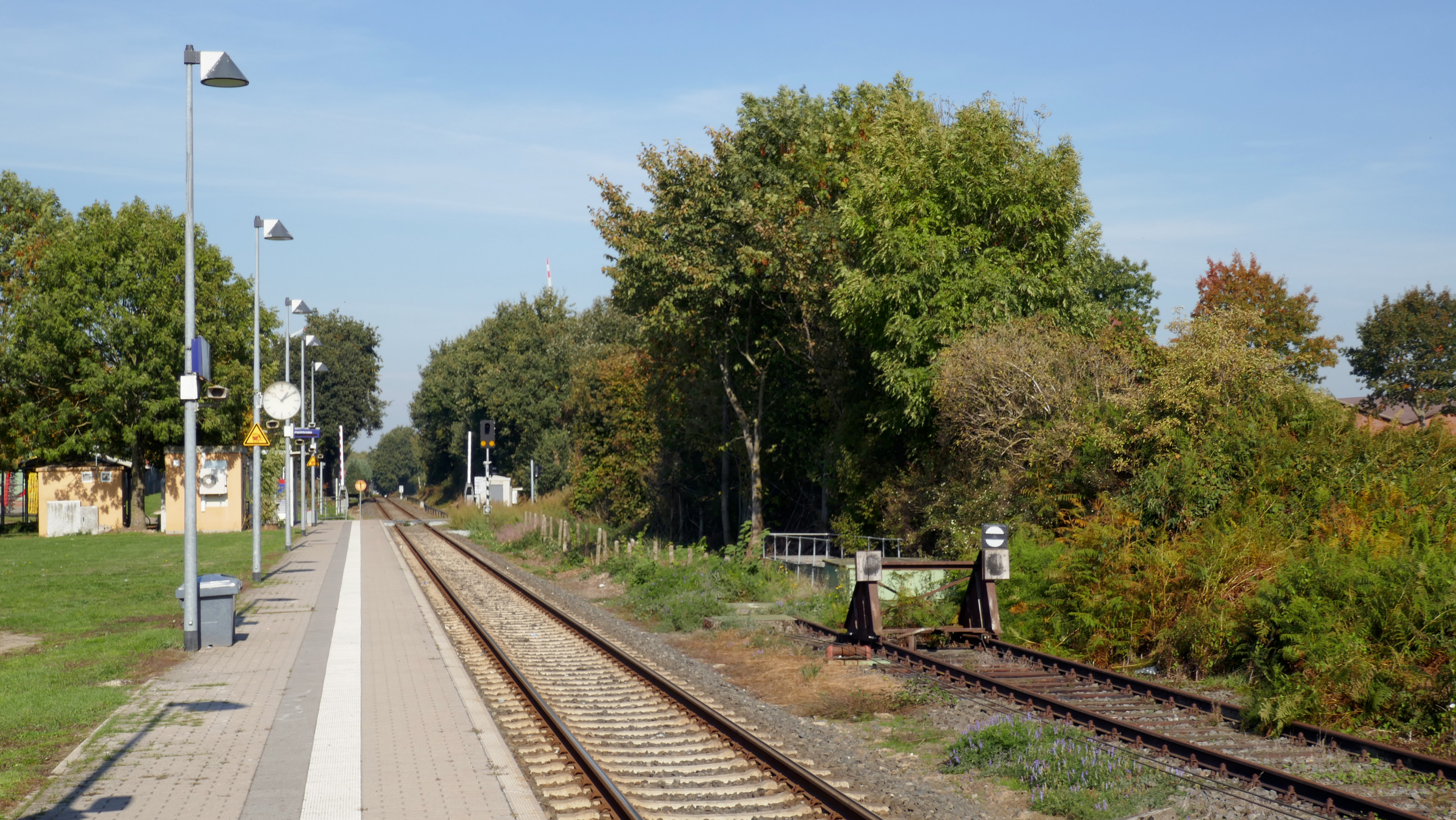
- Rechterfeld railway station in 2018

General information
- Location: Rechterfeld, Lower Saxony; Germany
- Coordinates: 52.83815°N 8.3912°E
- Line: Delmenhorst–Hesepe railway
- Platforms: 1
- Tracks: 1

Other information
- Fare zone: VLV: 613 (buses only)

Services
Preceding station	NordWestBahn	Following station
Goldenstedt (Oldb) towards Osnabrück Hbf	RB 58	Wildeshausen towards Bremen Hbf
Location

Rechterfeld is a railway station located in Rechterfeld, Germany. The station is located on the Delmenhorst–Hesepe railway and the train services are operated by NordWestBahn.

== Train services ==
The station is served by the following services:

- Local services RB 58 Osnabrück - Bramsche - Vechta - Delmenhorst - Bremen
