= Neuenkirchen (Oldb) station =

Railway station in Neuenkirchen-Vörden, Germany

Neuenkirchen (Oldb)
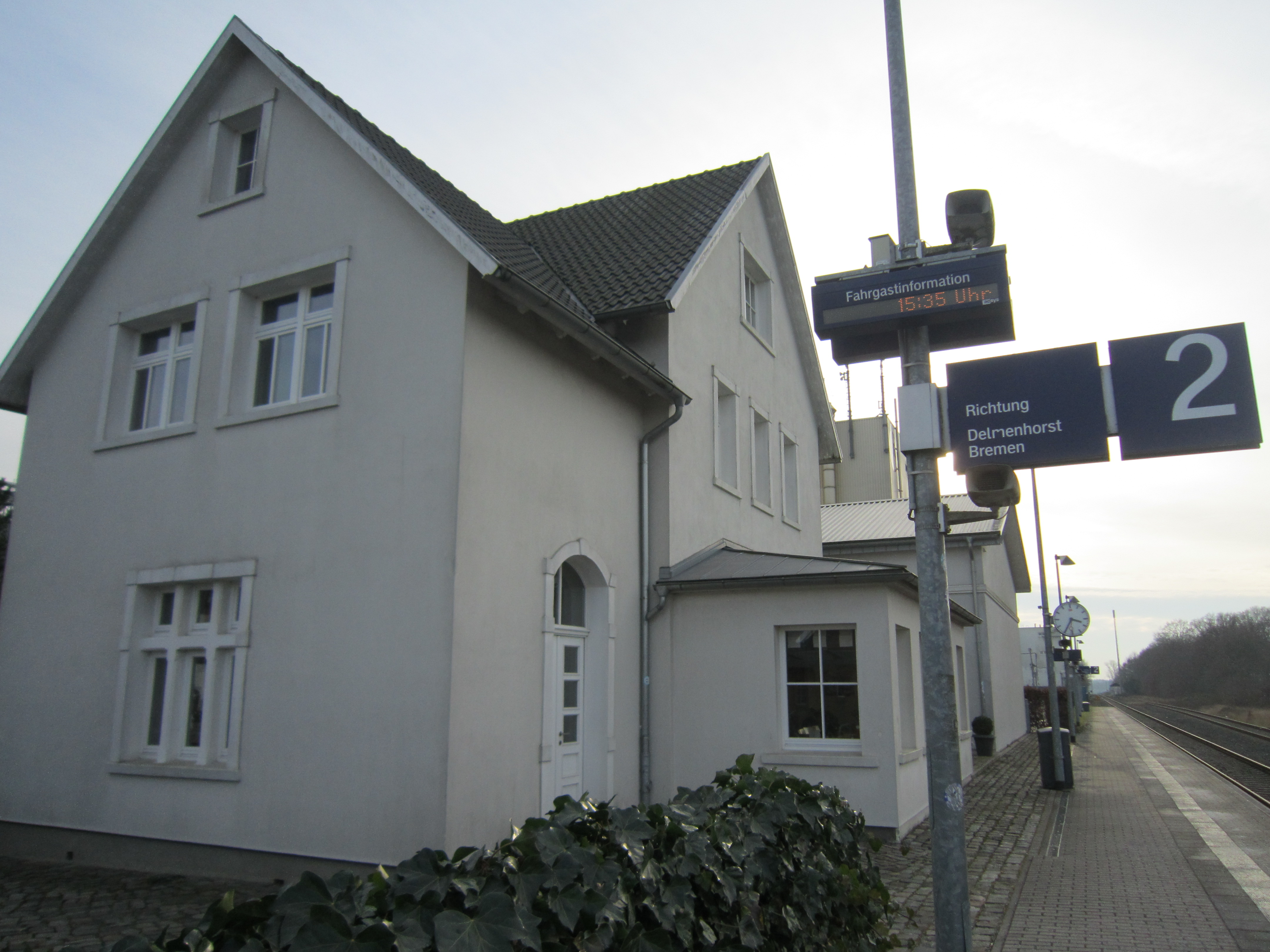
- Neuenkirchen railway station in 2016

General information
- Location: Neuenkirchen-Vörden, Lower Saxony; Germany
- Coordinates: 52.50837°N 8.05956°E
- Line: Delmenhorst–Hesepe railway
- Platforms: 1
- Tracks: 1

Services
Preceding station	NordWestBahn	Following station
Rieste towards Osnabrück Hbf	RB 58	Holdorf (Oldb) towards Bremen Hbf
Location

Neuenkirchen (Oldb) is a railway station located in Neuenkirchen-Vörden, Germany. The station is located on the Delmenhorst–Hesepe railway and the train services are operated by NordWestBahn.

== Train services ==
The station is served by the following services:

- Local services RB 58 Osnabrück - Bramsche - Vechta - Delmenhorst - Bremen
