= Ganderkesee station =

Railway station in Ganderkesee, Germany

Ganderkesee
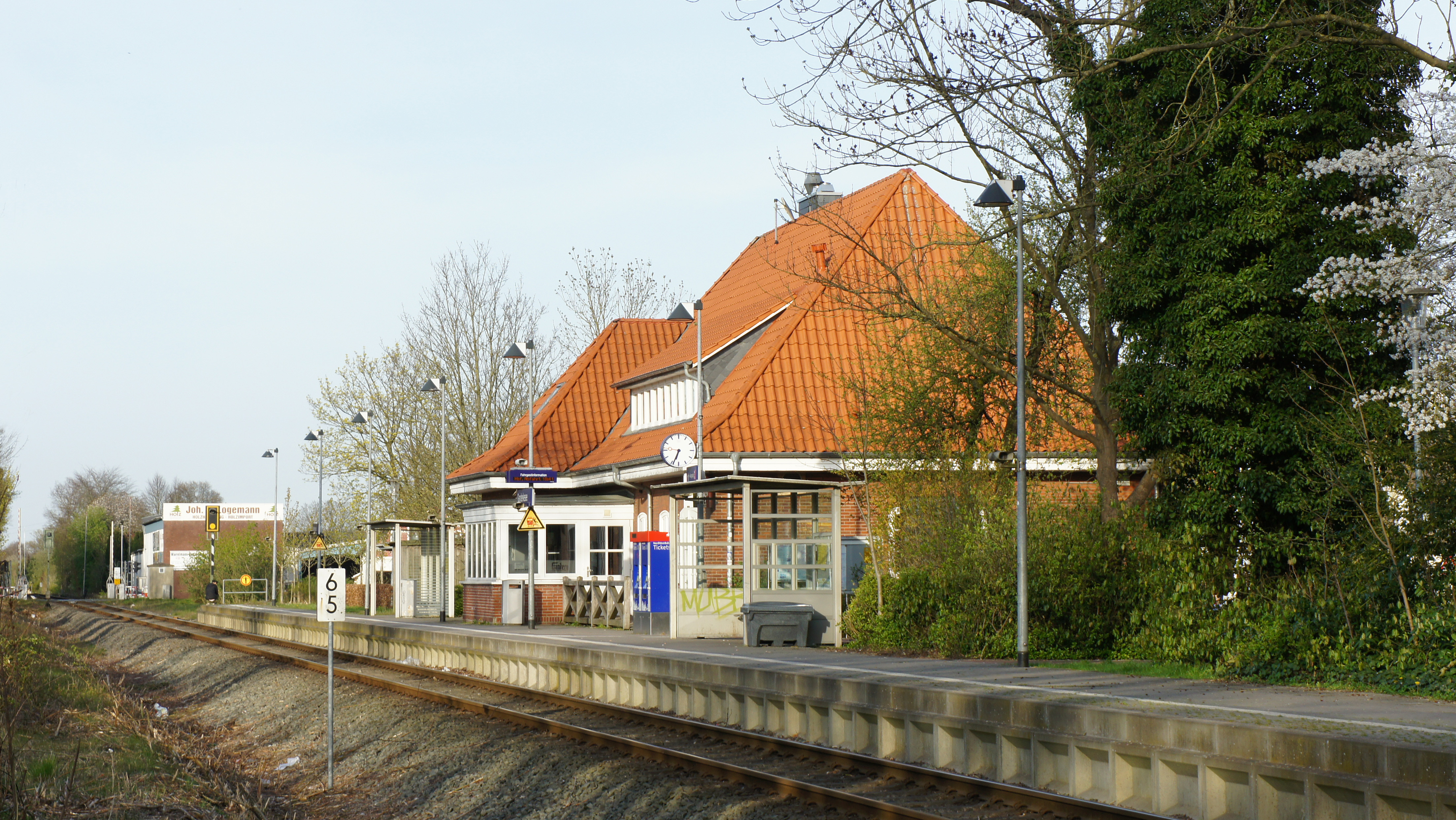
- Ganderkesee railway station in 2020

General information
- Location: Ganderkesee, Lower Saxony; Germany
- Coordinates: 53.0351°N 8.5429°E
- Line: Delmenhorst–Hesepe railway
- Platforms: 1
- Tracks: 1

Other information
- Fare zone: VBN: 720

Services
| Preceding station | NordWestBahn | Following station |
|---|---|---|
| Brettorf towards Osnabrück Hbf | RB 58 | Delmenhorst towards Bremen Hbf |
Location

Ganderkesee is a railway station located in Ganderkesee, Germany. The station is located on the Delmenhorst–Hesepe railway and the train services are operated by NordWestBahn.

== Train services ==
The station is served by the following services:

- Local services RB 58 Osnabrück - Bramsche - Vechta - Delmenhorst - Bremen
