= Varel station =

Railway station in Varel, Germany

Varel (Oldb)
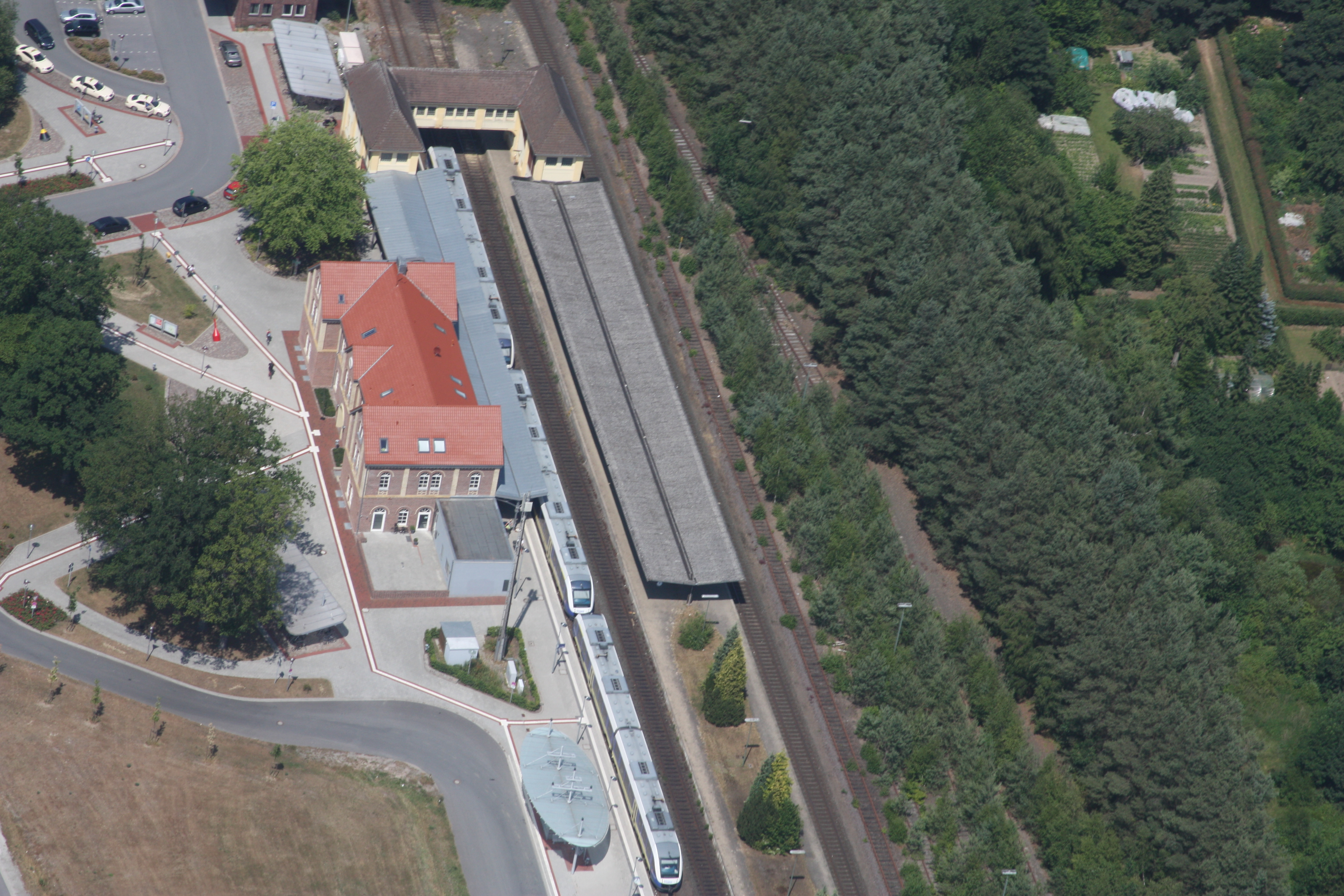
- Varel railway station from the air

General information
- Location: Varel, Lower Saxony; Germany
- Coordinates: 53.2356°N 8.0900°E
- Line: Oldenburg–Wilhelmshaven railway
- Platforms: 3

Services
Preceding station	NordWestBahn	Following station
Sande towards Wilhelmshaven	RE 18	Jaderberg towards Osnabrück Hbf
Sande towards Esens(Ostfriesl)	RB 59 Limited service	Jaderberg One-way operation
Preceding station	Bremen S-Bahn	Following station
Sande towards Wilhelmshaven	RS3	Jaderberg towards Bremen Hbf
Location

Varel (German: Bahnhof Varel) is a railway station located in Varel, Germany. The station is located on the Oldenburg–Wilhelmshaven railway. The train services are operated by NordWestBahn.

== Train services ==
The following services currently call at the station:

- Regional services RE 18 Wilhelmshaven - Varel - Oldenburg - Cloppenburg - Bramsche - Osnabrück
- S-Bahn service RS3 Oldenburg (Oldb) Hbf – Rastede – Jaderberg – Varel (Oldb) – Sande – Wilhelmshaven
