= Sande station =

Railway station in Lower Saxony, Germany

Sande
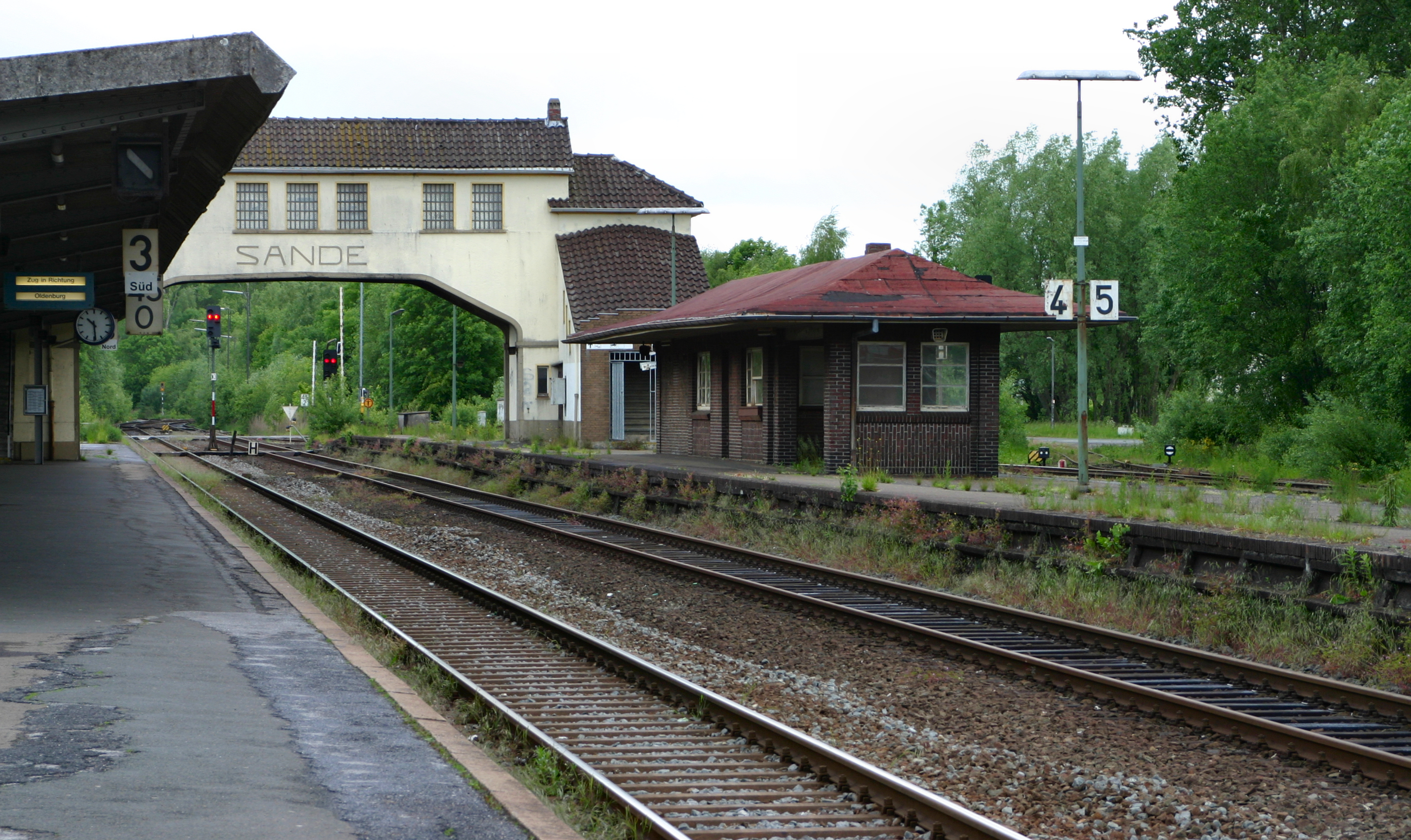
- Sande railway station

General information
- Location: Sande, Lower Saxony; Germany
- Coordinates: 53.2923°N 8.0153°E
- Lines: Oldenburg–Wilhelmshaven railway Sande-Esens railway
- Platforms: 2

Services
Preceding station	NordWestBahn	Following station
Varel towards Osnabrück Hbf	RE 18	Wilhelmshaven Terminus
Schortens-Heidmühle towards Esens	RB 59	Varel One-way operation
Schortens-Heidmühle towards Esens	RB 59	Wilhelmshaven Terminus
Preceding station	Bremen S-Bahn	Following station
Varel towards Wilhelmshaven	RS3	Wilhelmshaven towards Bremen Hbf
Location

Sande station (German: Bahnhof Sande) is a railway station located in Sande, Lower Saxony, Germany. The station is located on the Oldenburg–Wilhelmshaven railway and Sande-Esens railway. The train services are operated by NordWestBahn.

== Train services ==
The following services currently call at the station:

- Regional services RE 18 Wilhelmshaven - Varel - Oldenburg - Cloppenburg - Bramsche - Osnabrück
- Local services RB 59 Esens - Sande - Wilhelmshaven
- S-Bahn service RS3 Oldenburg (Oldb) Hbf – Rastede – Jaderberg – Varel (Oldb) – Sande – Wilhelmshaven
