= Ibbenbüren-Laggenbeck station =

Railway station in Laggenbeck, Germany

Coordinates: 52°15′50″N 7°47′04″E

Ibbenbüren Laggenbeck
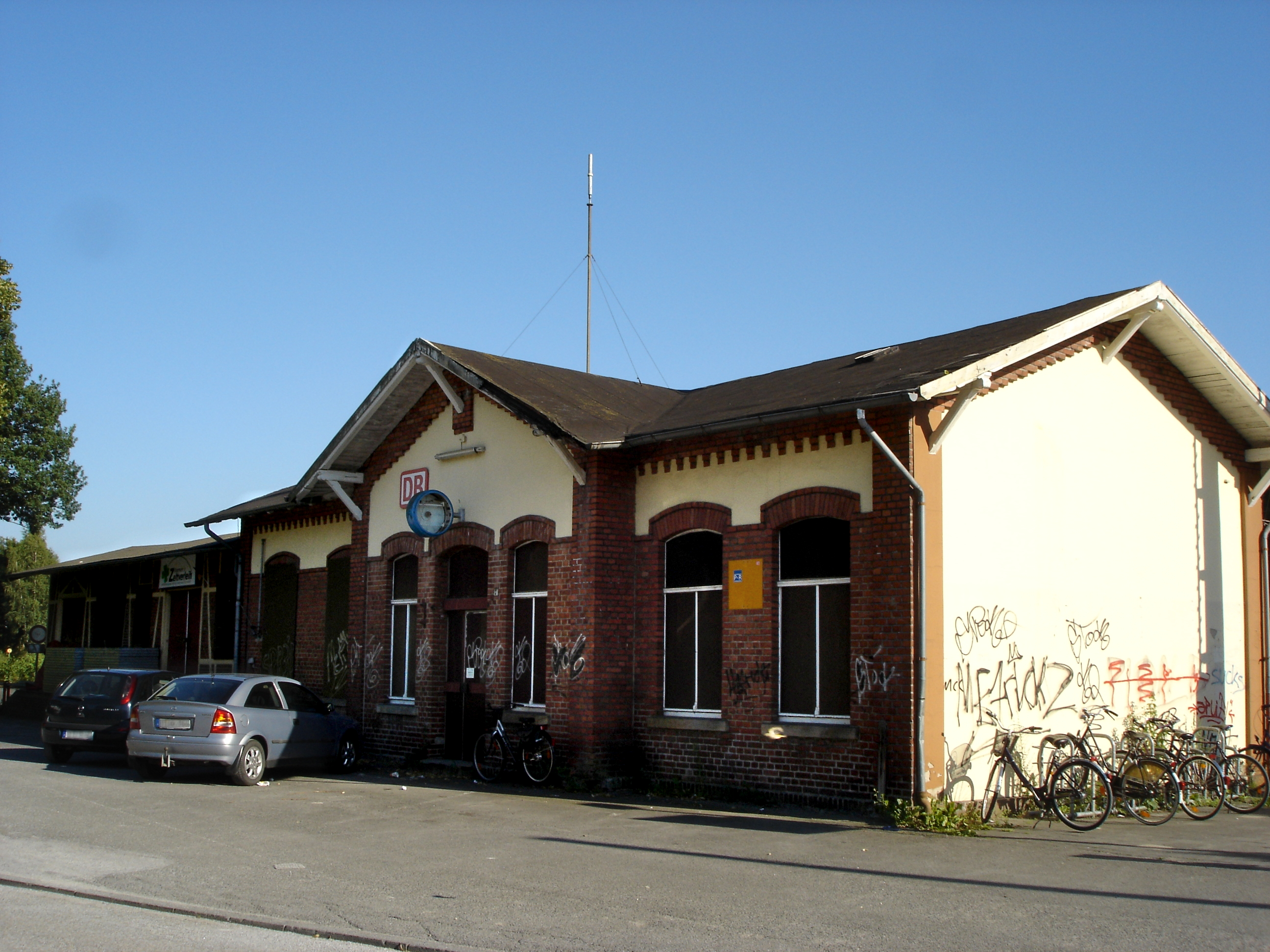
- Ibbenbüren-Laggenbeck railway station

General information
- Location: Ibbenbüren, NRW; Germany
- Line: Löhne–Rheine railway
- Platforms: 2

Construction
- Accessible: Yes

Other information
- Station code: n/a
- Category: 5
- Fare zone: Westfalentarif: 51034
- Website: www.bahnhof.de

History
- Opened: 1884

Services
Preceding station		Following station
Ibbenbüren towards Rheine	RE 60	Osnabrück Altstadt towards Braunschweig Hbf
Preceding station		Following station
Ibbenbüren towards Hengelo	RB 61	Osnabrück Altstadt towards Bielefeld Hbf
Location

Ibbenbüren-Laggenbeck is a railway station located in Laggenbeck, a village of Ibbenbüren, Germany. The station was opened in 1884 and is located on the Löhne–Rheine line. The train services are operated by WestfalenBahn. The station was known as Laggenbeck until December 2004.

== Train services ==
The following services currently call at Rheine:

- Regional services RE 60 Rheine - Osnabrück - Minden - Hanover - Braunschweig
- Local services RB 61 Bad Bentheim - Rheine - Osnabrück - Herford - Bielefeld
