= Vechta station =

Railway station in Vechta, Germany

Vechta
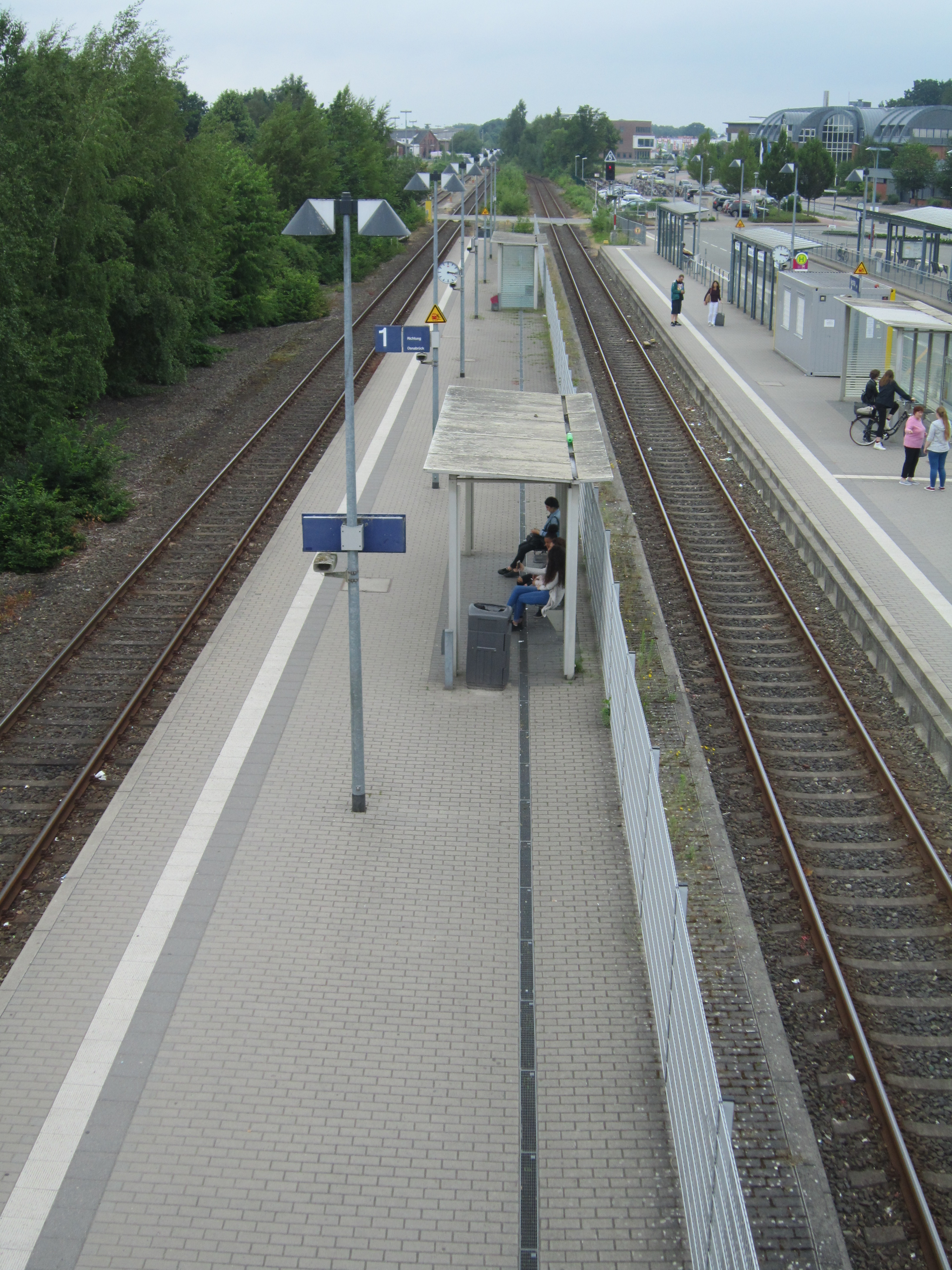
- Vechta railway station in 2018

General information
- Location: Vechta, Lower Saxony; Germany
- Coordinates: 52.7292°N 8.2804°E
- Line: Delmenhorst–Hesepe railway
- Platforms: 2
- Tracks: 2

Services
Preceding station	NordWestBahn	Following station
Lohne (Oldb) towards Osnabrück Hbf	RB 58	Lutten towards Bremen Hbf
Location

Vechta is a railway station located in Vechta, Germany. The station opened on 1 October 1885 and is located on the Delmenhorst–Hesepe railway. The train services are operated by NordWestBahn.

Between Vechta and Lutten railway station, the trains stop at Stoppelmarkt during the market.

== Train services ==
The station is served by the following services:

- Local services RB 58 Osnabrück - Bramsche - Vechta - Delmenhorst - Bremen
