= Oldenburg–Osnabrück railway =

Railway line in Germany

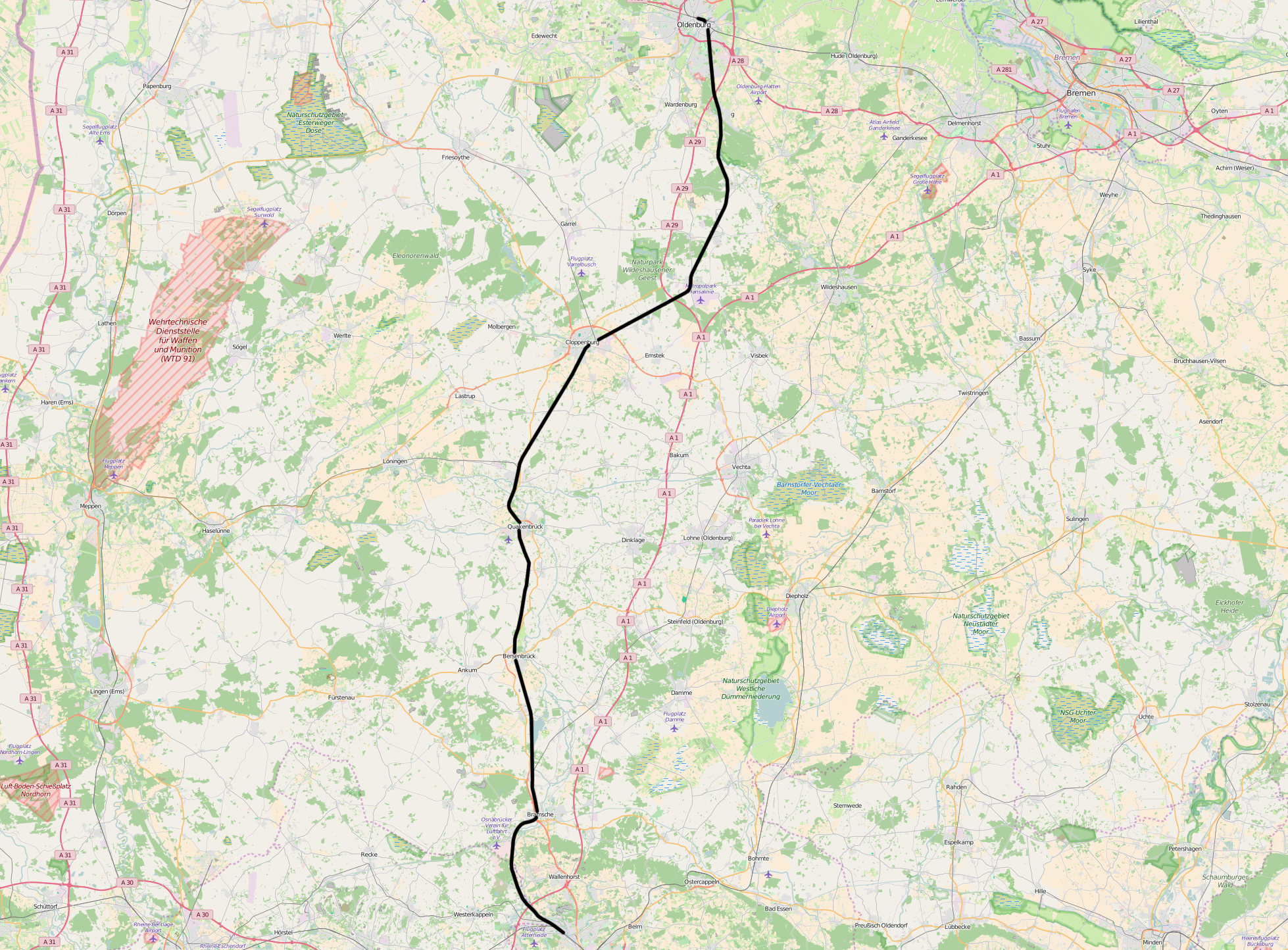

Overview
- Status: in use
- Line number: 392
- Locale: Germany
- Termini: Oldenburg; Osnabrück

Service
- Type: Heavy rail
- Operator(s): NordWestBahn

History
- Opened: 1875

Technical
- Line length: 113 km (70 mi)
- Number of tracks: 1; 2 between Oldenburg Hbf – Oldenburg-Osternburg and Bramsche – Achmer
- Track gauge: 1,435 mm (4 ft 8 1/2 in) standard gauge
- Operating speed: 120 km/h (75 mph)

The Oldenburg–Osnabrück railway is a single-track, non-electrified railway line from Oldenburg to Osnabrück, both in the German state of Lower Saxony.

The line was opened in two stages between 1875 and 1876. The first section, from Oldenburg to Quakenbrück, was built between 1870 and 1875 by the Grand Duchy of Oldenburg State Railways (GOE). The opening of the first section took place on 15 October 1875. The section from Quakenbrück to Osnabrück-Eversburg, then passing through Prussian territory, opened only a year later, on 30 June 1876. The official opening took place on 15 November 1876.

Until the mid-1990s, there was a modest long-distance train connection over the line. There was a daily express train from Koblenz and Cologne to Wilhelmshaven and a train from Mönchengladbach to Wilhelmshaven.

From 2000 onwards, the infrastructure was expanded to introduce a train service with shorter journey times and better connections. Part of the development was to increase the maximum line speed to 120 km/h and the closure of little used stations. The travel time between Oldenburg and Osnabrück was consequently reduced by 22 minutes to 87 minutes. In Oldenburg, good connections were created with the regional and intercity trains on the line between Bremen and Emden. The travel time between Wilhelmshaven and Osnabrück also fell by 45 minutes.

The services on the line have been operated by NordWestBahn since November 2000. The current contract continues until December 2026.

== Usage ==
The line is used by the following service(s):

- Regional services Wilhelmshaven - Varel - Oldenburg - Cloppenburg - Bramsche - Osnabrück
- Local services Osnabrück - Bramsche - Vechta - Delmenhorst - Bremen between Osnabrück and Hesepe
