= Wilhelmshaven station =

Railway station in Germany

Wilhelmshaven
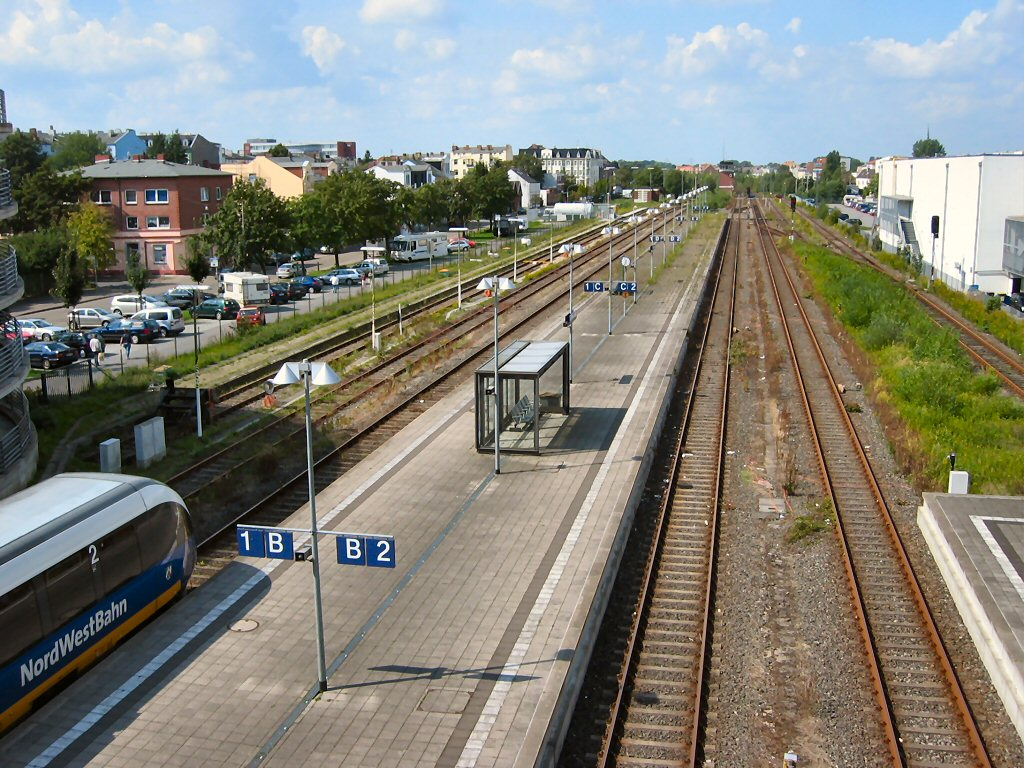
- Wilhelmshaven station

General information
- Location: Wilhelmshaven, Lower Saxony; Germany
- Coordinates: 53°31′08″N 8°06′54″E
- Line: Oldenburg–Wilhelmshaven railway
- Platforms: 4

History
- Opened: 14 July 1867; 159 years ago
- Electrified: 12 December 2022; 3 years ago
- Former names: 1867–1869: Heppens; 1869–1937: Wilhelmshaven; 1937–2015: Wilhelmshaven Hauptbahnhof

Services
Preceding station	NordWestBahn	Following station
Sande towards Osnabrück Hbf	RE 18	Terminus
Sande towards Esens	RB 59	Terminus
Preceding station	Bremen S-Bahn	Following station
Sande towards Bremen Hbf	RS3	Terminus
Location

Wilhelmshaven, also known as Wilhelmshaven Hauptbahnhof (German: Bahnhof Wilhelmshaven), is a railway station in Wilhelmshaven, Germany, on the Wilhelmshaven–Oldenburg railway. The trains are operated by NordWestBahn.

== Train services ==
The station is served by the following:

- Regional services RE 18 Wilhelmshaven - Varel - Oldenburg - Cloppenburg - Bramsche - Osnabrück
- Local services RB 59 Esens - Sande - Wilhelmshaven
- S-Bahn service RS3 Oldenburg (Oldb) Hbf – Rastede – Jaderberg – Varel (Oldb) – Sande – Wilhelmshaven
