= Delmenhorst–Hesepe railway =

Railway line in Germany

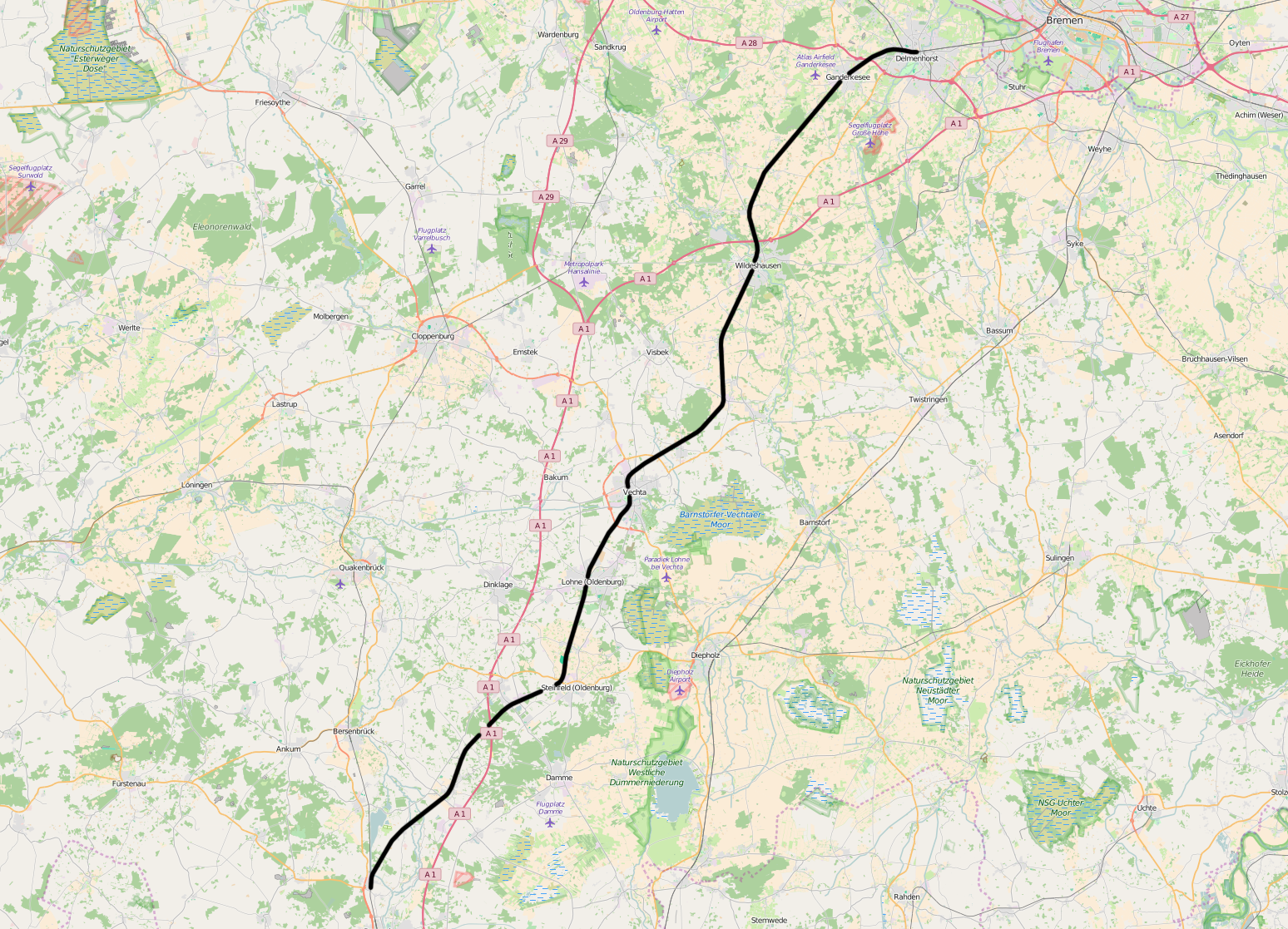

Overview
- Status: in use
- Line number: 394
- Locale: Germany
- Termini: Delmenhorst; Hesepe

Service
- Type: Heavy rail
- Route number: 1560
- Operator: NordWestBahn

History
- Opened: 1888

Technical
- Line length: 88 km (55 mi)
- Num of tracks: 1
- Track gauge: 1,435 mm (4 ft 8 1/2 in) standard gauge
- Operating speed: 80 km/h (50 mph)

The Delmenhorst–Hesepe railway is a single-track, non-electrified railway line from Delmenhorst to Hesepe, both in the German state of Lower Saxony.

The line was opened in four stages between 1888 and 1900. The first section from Vechta to Lohne was opened in 1888 as part of the Ahlhorn–Vechta railway. The section between Delmenhorst and Vechta opened on 1 May 1898. One year later on 1 November 1899 the section between Lohne and Neuenkirchen opened. This section was extended to Hesepe on 1 May 1900.

The services on the line have been operated by NordWestBahn since November 2000. The current contract continues until December 2026.

== Usage ==
The line is used by the following service(s):

- Local services Osnabrück - Bramsche - Vechta - Delmenhorst - Bremen
