= Osnabrück Hauptbahnhof =

Railway station in Germany

Osnabrück Hbf
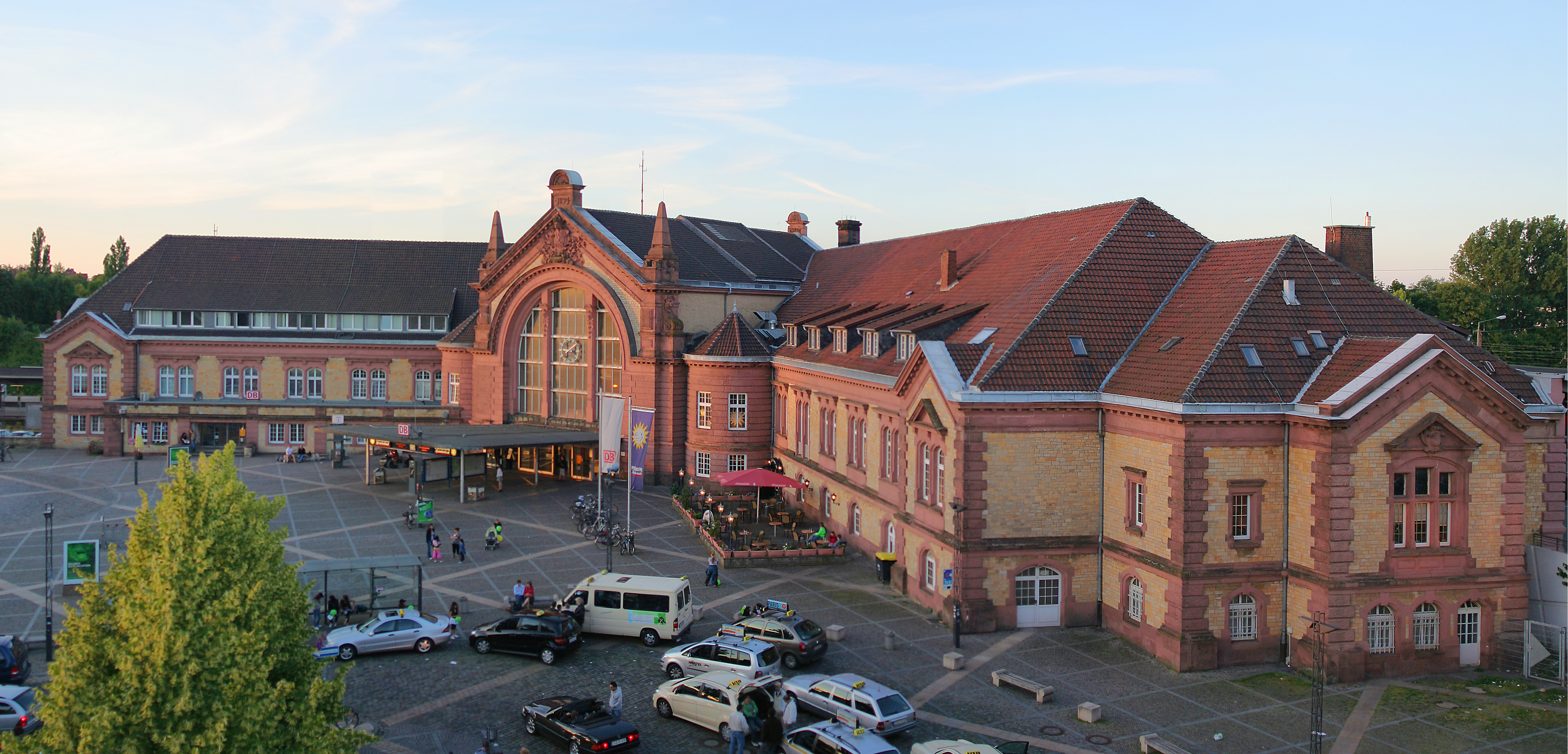
- Entrance building and station forecourt

General information
- Location: Theodor-Heuss-Platz 2 Osnabrück, Lower Saxony; Germany
- Coordinates: 52°16′22″N 8°3′42″E
- Owner: Deutsche Bahn
- Operator: DB Station&Service
- Lines: Wanne-Eickel–Hamburg railway (KBS 385); Löhne–Rheine railway (KBS 375); Osnabrück–Bielefeld railway (KBS 402); Oldenburg–Osnabrück railway (KBS 392); Delmenhorst–Hesepe railway (KBS 394)
- Platforms: 9

Construction
- Accessible: Yes

Other information
- Station code: 4787
- DS100 code: HO
- Category: 2
- Fare zone: VOS: 100 (VOS Plus tickets accepted on RB75 up to Dissen-Bad Rothenfelde); Westfalentarif: 91001 (VOS transitional tariff)
- Website: www.bahnhof.de

History
- Opened: 1895
Services
Preceding station	DB Fernverkehr	Following station
Münster Hbf towards Aachen Hbf	ICE 14	Hannover Hbf towards Berlin Ostbahnhof
Münster Hbf towards Köln Hbf	ICE 33	Bremen Hbf towards Westerland (Sylt)
Münster Hbf towards München Hbf	ICE 42	Bremen Hbf towards Hamburg-Altona
Münster Hbf towards Basel SBB	ICE 43	Bremen Hbf towards Hamburg-Altona
Münster Hbf towards Amsterdam Centraal	ICE 77	Bünde towards Berlin Ostbahnhof
Preceding station		Following station
Münster Hbf towards Köln Hbf	FLX 20	Hamburg-Harburg towards Hamburg Hbf
Preceding station	DB Regio Nord	Following station
Bohmte towards Bremerhaven-Lehe	RE 9	Terminus
Preceding station	DB Regio NRW	Following station
Hasbergen towards Düsseldorf Hbf	RE 2	Terminus
Preceding station	NordWestBahn	Following station
Osnabrück Altstadt towards Wilhelmshaven	RE 18	Terminus
Osnabrück Altstadt towards Bremen Hbf	RB 58	Terminus
Terminus	RB 75	Osnabrück-Sutthausen towards Bielefeld Hbf
Preceding station		Following station
Osnabrück Altstadt towards Rheine	RE 60	Melle towards Braunschweig Hbf
Preceding station		Following station
Osnabrück Altstadt towards Hengelo	RB 61	Wissingen towards Bielefeld Hbf
Hasbergen towards Münster Hbf	RB 66	Terminus
Location

Osnabrück Hauptbahnhof is the main railway station serving the city of Osnabrück in Lower Saxony, Germany. The station is located in central Osnabrück, on the eastern edge of the historic city centre.

The station was opened in 1895 and is situated on the Wanne-Eickel–Hamburg, Löhne–Rheine, Osnabrück–Bielefeld and the Oldenburg–Osnabrück lines. The train services are operated by Deutsche Bahn, Hamburg-Köln-Express, NordWestBahn, Eurobahn and WestfalenBahn. The station features two levels, with lines at right angles to each other.

Close to the railway stations are several stores including a cinema, a döner shop, an escort service, and a disco.

== History ==
Osnabrück Hauptbahnhof was ceremoniously opened as the “Central Station” by German Emperor Wilhelm II on 24 April 1895. The new station was situated where the Hamburg-Venlo railway crossed the Hanoverian Western Railway at right angles with a height difference of 5.85 m (19.2 ft), which was why the design of a station at two levels was chosen. The new station replaced the two separate previous stations, the Hanoverian station located on the Hanoverian Western Railway, and the Bremen station located on the Hamburg-Venlo railway line.

== Rail services ==
In the 2026 timetable, the following services stopped at the station:

=== Long distance ===
Line	Route	Frequency	Operator
ICE 14	Berlin – Wolfsburg – Hannover – Osnabrück – Münster – Essen – Düsseldorf – Cologne	2 train pairs	DB Fernverkehr
ICE 33	Westerland – Niebüll – Itzehoe – Hamburg – Bremen – Osnabrück – Münster – Essen – Düsseldorf – Cologne	1 train pair	DB Fernverkehr
ICE 42	Hamburg-Altona – Hamburg – Bremen – Osnabrück – Münster – Dortmund – Cologne – Stuttgart – Munich	120 min	DB Fernverkehr
ICE 43	Hamburg-Altona – Hamburg – Bremen – Osnabrück – Münster – Dortmund – Wuppertal – Cologne – Frankfurt Airport – Mannheim – Karlsruhe – Freiburg – Basel SBB	120 min with gaps	DB Fernverkehr
ICE 77	Amsterdam – Hilversum – Amersfoort – Apeldoorn – Deventer – Hengelo – Bad Bentheim – Rheine – Osnabrück – Bünde – Hannover – Berlin-Spandau – Berlin – Berlin Ostbahnhof	120 min	DB Fernverkehr
FLX 20	Hamburg – Hamburg-Harburg– Bremen– Osnabrück – Münster– Gelsenkirchen – Essen– Duisburg– Düsseldorf– Köln	2 train pairs	Flixtrain

In March 2026 GoVolta services began calling.

=== Regional services ===
Line	Route	Frequency
RE 2	Osnabrück – Hasbergen – Lengerich – Münster – Recklinghausen – Essen – Duisburg – Düsseldorf	60 min
RE 9	Bremerhaven-Lehe – Bremen – Osnabrück	60 min
RE 18	Wilhelmshaven – Varel – Oldenburg – Cloppenburg – Bramsche – Osnabrück	60 min
RE 60	Rheine - Osnabrück - Minden - Hannover - Braunschweig	120 min
RB 58	Osnabrück – Bramsche – Vechta – Delmenhorst – Bremen	60 min
RB 61	Bad Bentheim – Rheine – Osnabrück – Herford – Bielefeld	60 min
RB 66	Osnabrück – Münster	60 min
RB 75	Osnabrück – Halle (Westf) – Bielefeld	60 min

== Bus services ==
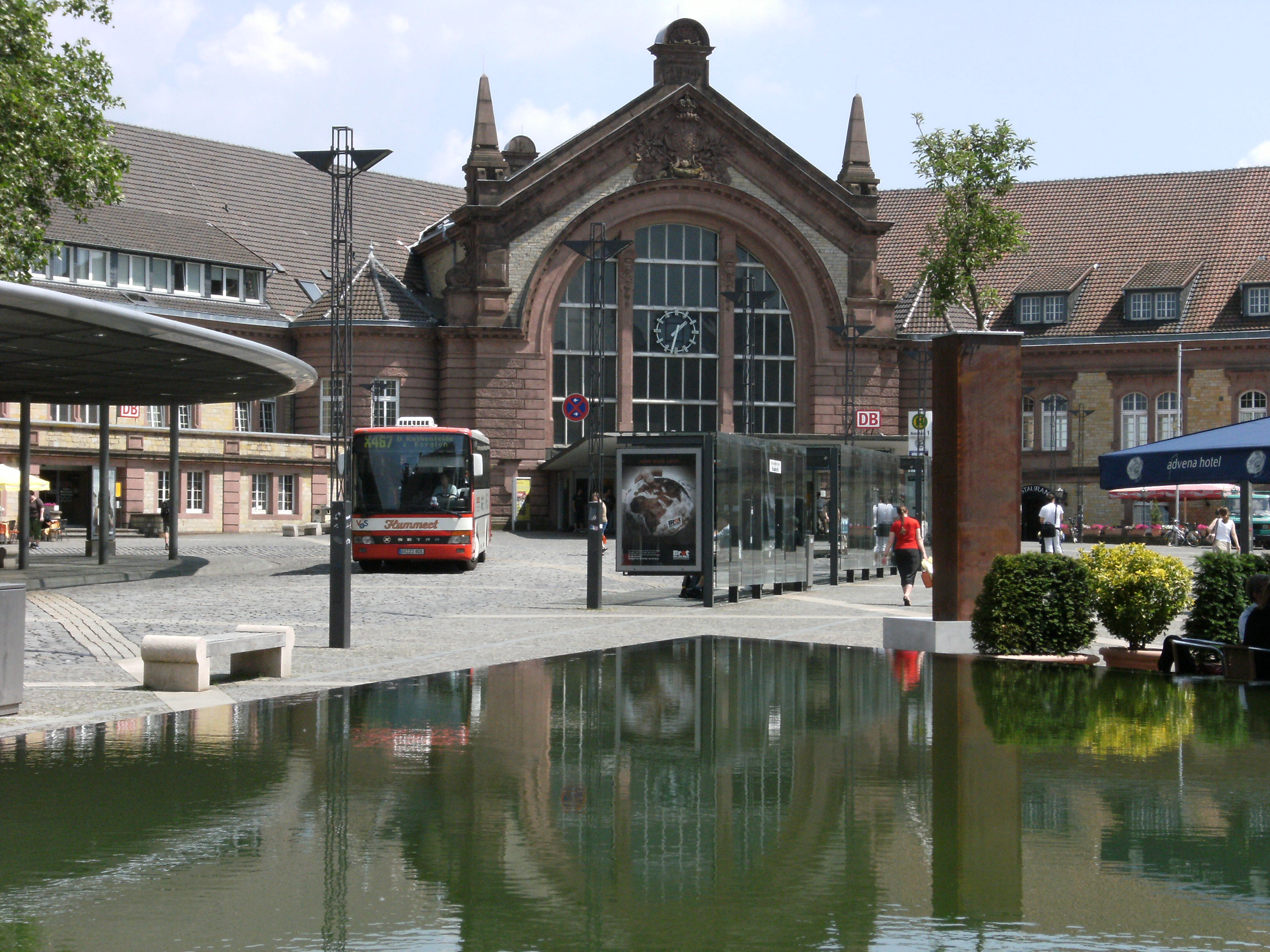
The bus station outside the station

Many bus services depart from the bus station outside the station.

A coach shuttle service to Münster Osnabrück Airport operates from the station, taking approximately 40 minutes to get from the railway station to the airport.

== See also ==
- Railway stations in Germany
- List of railway stations in Lower Saxony
- Rail transport in Germany
