= NordWestBahn =

German railway company

NordWestBahn GmbH
- Company type: GmbH
- Founded: 1992
- Headquarters: Osnabrück, Germany
- Area served: Germany
- Services: Passenger transportation
- Parent: Transdev Germany; Stadtwerke Osnabrück; VWG Oldenburg
- Website: www.nordwestbahn.de

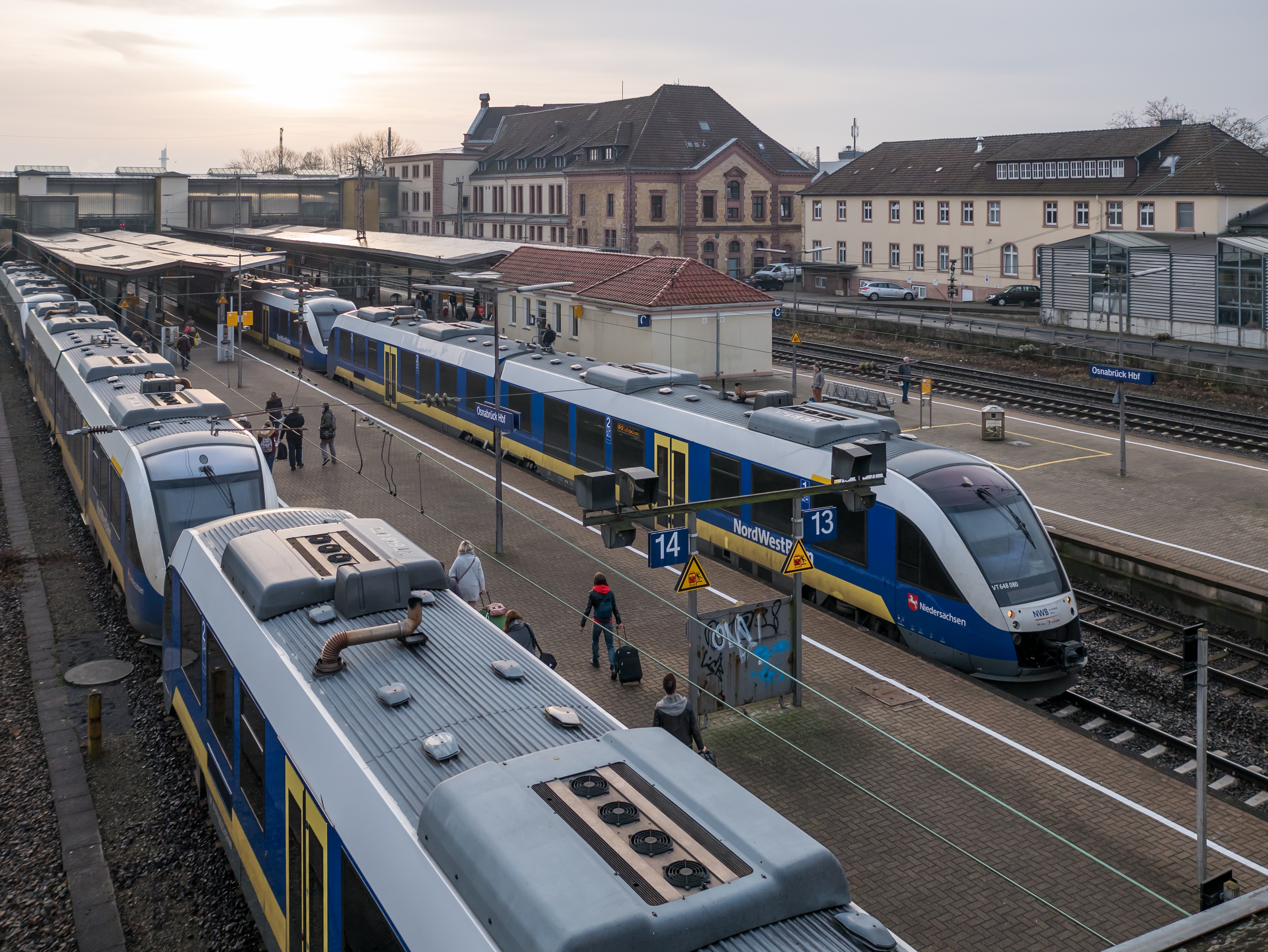
NordWestBahn trains at Osnabrück Hbf

The North West Railway company (German: NordWestBahn GmbH, abbreviated to NWB) is a private railway company providing regional train services on several routes in northern and western Germany. It is a joint venture of Stadtwerke Osnabrück AG, Verkehr und Wasser GmbH in Oldenburg and Transdev Germany, Berlin. The head office of the company is in Osnabrück. NWB claims to be Germany's largest regional railway company.

Since 5 November 2000, NordWestBahn has operated, on behalf of the public transport company of Lower Saxony (Landesnahverkehrsgesellschaft Niedersachsen, abbreviated to LNVG), the Weser-Ems-Network in Lower Saxony. The company promptly pursued various other regional railway opportunities within the German market. During March 2008, NordWestBahn was selected to run the regional S-Bahn Bremen/Lower Saxony, having submitted a superior bid to the German national railway operator DB Regio; operation of these routes started in December 2010. Following a competitive tendering process in early 2019, the company retained operations in Bremen and Lower Saxony. On 6 November 2018, NordWestBahn was awarded the contract to operate the S-Bahn regional trains around Hanover.

== History ==
During 1999, NordWestBahn was established as a privately owned railway operator. During November of that year, it took over the first routes north of Osnabrück from the state-owned incumbent Deutsche Bahn (DB). Operationally, while NordWestBahn had established its own operations control center populated by its own employees, it needed to coordinate with the various pre-existing signal boxes, stations, and other facilities that remained in DB's hands. The company has also coordinated with various other private entities, such as Abellio. Over time, NordWestBahn has seen increased competition from emerging private railway companies.

In March 2008, NordWestBahn won the tender to operate the regional S-Bahn services in Bremen and Lower Saxony, having submitted a more favourable bid than the incumbent operator DB Regio; the contract awarded was reportedly worth roughly 500 million euros. The company commenced operation of these routes during December 2010.

Throughout the 2010s, NordWestBahn secured further opportunities. On 6 November 2018, NordWestBahn was awarded the contract to operate the S-Bahn regional trains serving Hannover. Valued in excess of €1.5 billion, this was an important milestone for the company, being the single largest regional railways contract in its history, pertaining to the operation of the entire 385-kilometre-long (239 mi) network around Hannover for a duration of 12 and a half years, starting in December 2021. To fulfil this demand, the company took on additional rolling stock in the form of Stadler FLIRT electric multiple units (EMUs).

During April 2019, it was announced that NordWestBahn had succeeded in its bid to retain the Regional S-Bahn Bremen & Niedersachsen franchise; under the terms of the new contract, which commenced in December 2021, it is set to continue running this franchise through to December 2036. Furthermore, the network is to be expanded and several improvements, such as capacity increases and new rolling stock, are to be implemented during this period. Later that same year, NordWestBahn agreed terms with the rolling stock leasor Alpha Trains for the latter to acquire 16 Stadler FLIRT EMUs for their use by the former around Bremen; the new fleet was introduced during late 2022. The existing Alstom Coradia fleet was also refurbished for continued use.

On 1 September 2022, substantial service changes were enacted. Specifically, those routes in the Rhein-Ruhr area formerly performed by NordWestBahn were split off from the core business, instead being operated by a separate company, Transdev RheinRuhr, which operates as RheinRuhrBahn. By this time, NordWestBahn was carrying roughly 40 million passenger per year and operated 145 trains, covering 19.1 million kilometres (11.9 million miles) annually; it had a total of 850 employees.

== Services ==
Network map of NWB routes in 2022.

=== NordWestBahn services ===
The following services are currently operated under the NordWestBahn brand:

Line	Name	Route	Contract dates
RE 18		Wilhelmshaven Hbf – Oldenburg (Oldb) Hbf – Osnabrück Hbf	11/2000 – 12/2026
RB 58		Bremen Hbf – Delmenhorst – Vechta – Osnabrück Hbf	11/2000 – 12/2026
RB 59		Wilhelmshaven Hbf – Jever – Wittmund – Esens	11/2000 – 12/2026
RS1		Bremen-Farge – Bremen Hbf – Verden	12/2011 – 12/2036
RS2		Bremerhaven-Lehe – Bremerhaven Hbf – Bremen Hbf – Twistringen	12/2010 – 12/2036
RS3	Formerly RE 19	Bremen Hbf – Oldenburg (Oldb) Hbf – Bad Zwischenahn	12/2003 – 12/2036
RS30		Bremen Hbf – Oldenburg Hbf – Bad Zwischenahn	12/2003 – 12/2036
RS4		Bremen Hbf – Nordenham	12/2010 – 12/2036
RS6		Verden (Aller) – Rotenburg	12/2022 – 12/2036
RB 74	Senne-Bahn	Bielefeld Hbf – Hövelhof – Paderborn Hbf	12/2003 – 12/2029
RB 75	Haller Willem	Bielefeld Hbf – Halle (Westf.) – Dissen-Bad Rothenfelde – Osnabrück Hbf	12/2003 – 12/2029
RB 84	Egge-Bahn	Paderborn Hbf – Ottbergen – Holzminden – Kreiensen -	12/2003 – 12/2029
RB 85	Oberweserbahn	Paderborn – Altenbeken – Ottbergen – Göttingen	12/2013 – 12/2029

=== RheinRuhrBahn services ===
The following services were operated as NordWestBahn services until 1 September 2022, but are now branded as RheinRuhrBahn:

Line	Name	Route	Contract dates
RE 10	Niers-Express	Düsseldorf Hbf – Krefeld Hbf – Geldern – Kleve	12/2009 – 12/2028
RE 14	Emscher-Münsterland-Express	Borken (Westf) / Coesfeld (Westf) – Dorsten – Gladbeck – Bottrop Hbf – Essen Hbf - Essen-Steele	12/2006 – 12/2029
RB 31	Der Niederrheiner	Xanten – (Kamp-Lintfort South State Garden Show 2020) Moers – Duisburg Hbf	12/2009 – 12/2027
RB 36	Ruhrort-Bahn	Duisburg-Ruhrort – Oberhausen Hbf	12/2010 – 12/2027
RE 44	Fossa-Emscher-Express	Moers – Duisburg Hbf – Oberhausen Hbf – Bottrop Hbf	12/2010 – 12/2027
S7	Der Müngstener	Wuppertal Hbf – Wuppertal-Oberbarmen – Remscheid Hbf – Solingen Hbf	12/2023 – 12/2028 (option: 12/2031)

== Fleet ==
Class	Image	Cars per set	Type	Top speed		Number	Builder	Built
Class	Image	Cars per set	Type	km/h	mph	Number	Builder	Built
VT 643		2 or 3	Diesel multiple unit	120	75	43	Bombardier Talent	2003-2006
VT 648		2	Diesel multiple unit	120	75	59	Alstom LINT-41	2000-2010
ET 440		3 or 5	Electric multiple unit	160	99	35	Alstom Coradia Continental	2010

== Depots ==
NordWestBahn has five depots to maintain its fleet. These are at Osnabrück, Dorsten, Mettmann (operated by RegioBahn), Bremerhaven and Kleve.
