= Hannover-Nordstadt station =

Railway station in Hannover-Nordstadt, Germany

Hannover Nordstadt
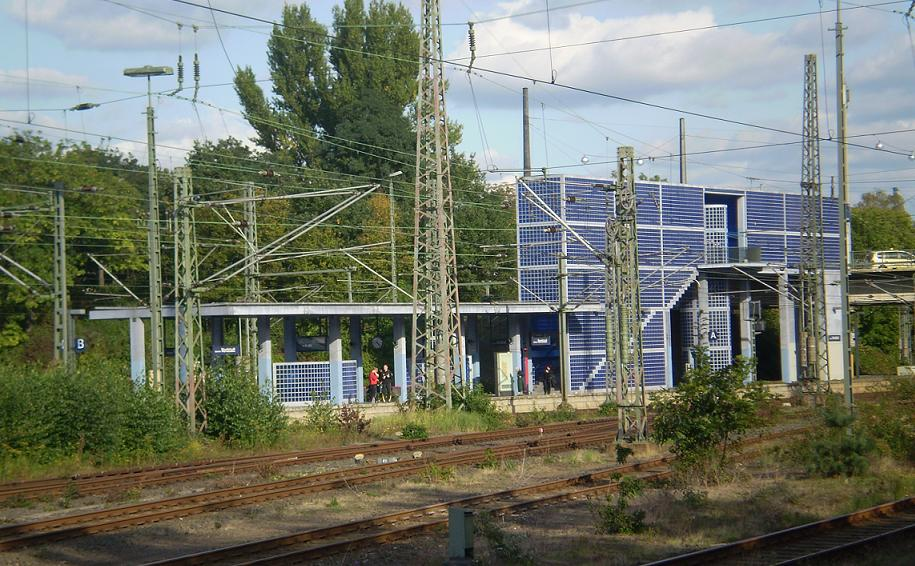
- Hanover-Nordstadt railway station

General information
- Location: Hanover, Lower Saxony; Germany
- Coordinates: 52.2338°N 9.4303°E
- Lines: Hanover–Minden railway Bremen–Hanover railway Heath Railway
- Platforms: 2

Other information
- Station code: 7899
- Category: 4
- Fare zone: GVH: A

Services
Preceding station	Hanover S-Bahn	Following station
Leinhausen towards Minden (Westfalen)	S 1	Hannover Hbf towards Haste (Han)
Leinhausen towards Nienburg (Weser)	S 2	Hannover Hbf towards Haste (Han)
Ledeburg towards Bennemühlen	S 4	Hannover Hbf towards Hildesheim Hbf
Ledeburg towards Flughafen	S 5	Hannover Hbf towards Paderborn Hbf
Langenhagen Mitte towards Flughafen	S 8	Hannover Hbf towards Messe/Laatzen
Location

Hanover-Nordstadt is a railway station located in Hanover, Germany. The station is located on the Hanover–Minden railway, Bremen–Hanover railway and the Heath Railway. The train services are operated by Deutsche Bahn as part of the Hanover S-Bahn. It was designed in 1996 for the Expo line by Studio Hansjörg Göritz. Its design was showcased in the exhibition La Rinascimento della Stazione [The Rebirth of Train Stations] at the 1996 Venice Architecture Biennale.

== Train services ==
The following services currently call at the station:

- Hanover S-Bahn S1 Minden - Haste - Wunstorf - Hanover - Weetzen - Haste
- Hanover S-Bahn S2 Nienburg - Wunstorf - Hanover - Weetzen - Haste
- Hanover S-Bahn S4 Bennemühlen - Langenhagen - Hanover - Hanover Messe/Laatzen - Hildesheim
- Hanover S-Bahn S5 Hanover Airport - Langenhagen - Hanover - Weetzen - Hameln - Paderborn
- Hanover S-Bahn S8 Hanover Airport - Langenhagen - Hanover - Hanover Messe/Laatzen

== Tram services ==
Hanover Stadtbahn line 6 also serves the station.

- 6: Nordhafen - Nordstadt - City Centre - Braunschweigerplatz - Messe/Ost
