= Langenhagen Pferdemarkt–Hannover Airport railway =

Railway line in Germany

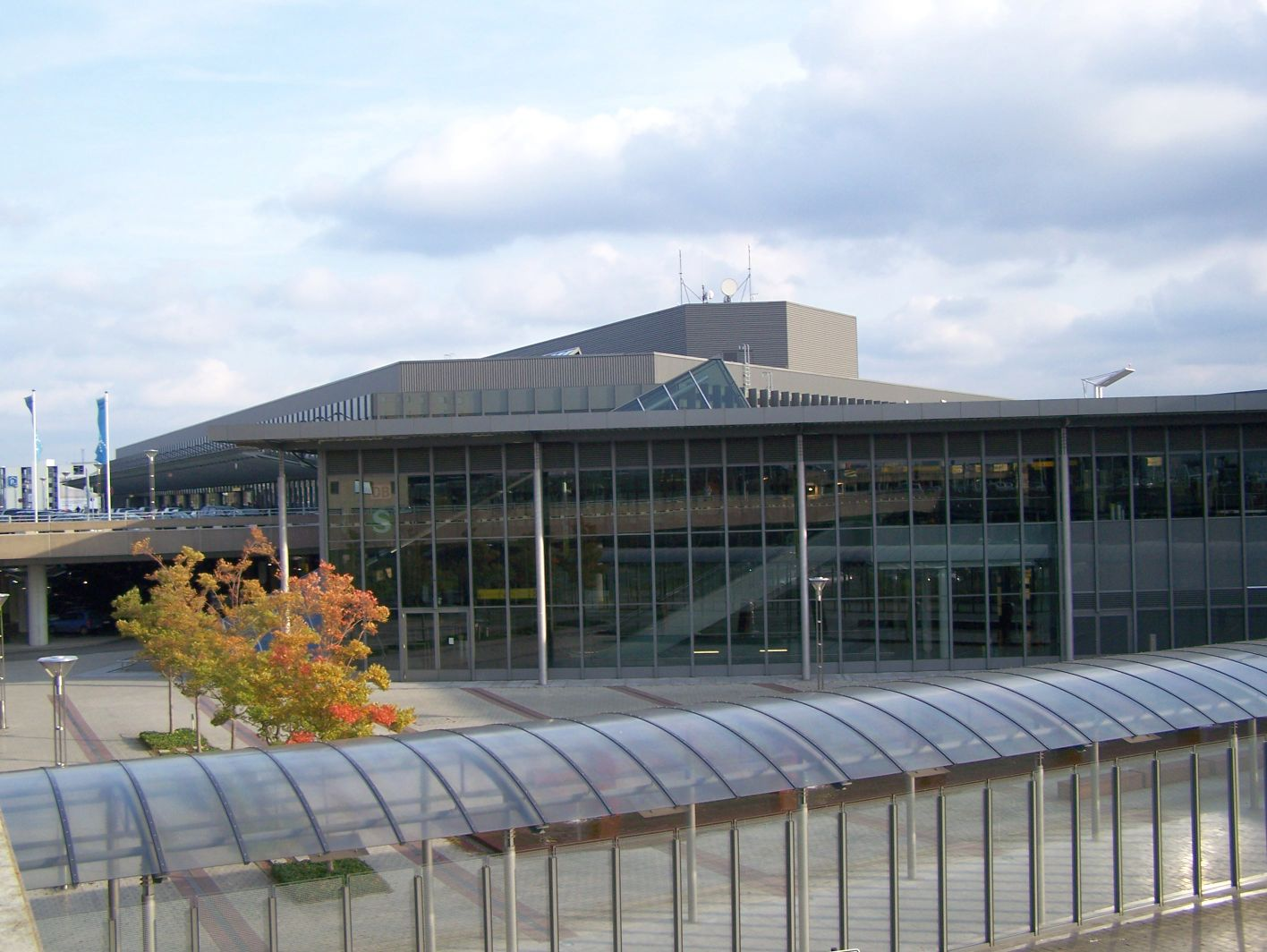
- Entrance hall of Hannover Airport station

Overview
- Line number: 1713
- Locale: Lower Saxony, Germany

Service
- Route number: 360.5

Technical
- Line length: 3.5 km (2.2 mi)
- Number of tracks: 1
- Track gauge: 1,435 mm (4 ft 8 1/2 in) standard gauge
- Minimum radius: 300 m (980 ft)
- Electrification: 15 kV/16.7 Hz AC overhead catenary
- Operating speed: 120 km/h (75 mph)

The Langenhagen Pferdemarkt–Hannover Airport railway is a main line in the town of Langenhagen in the Hanover Region in the German state of Lower Saxony. It provides a public transport connection to Hannover Airport. It has been operated exclusively by the Hanover S-Bahn since its opening on 28 May 2000.

== Route ==
Shortly after Langenhagen Pferdemarkt station, the line branches to the west off the Hanover–Buchholz railway, which runs to the north at this point. It then runs almost directly to the west, crossing the A 352. Shortly before Hannover Airport station, the line enters a cutting, which bends to the southwest and the line runs into the underground station.

The S-Bahn station is a terminal station and the only station on the line. The station has two platform tracks, which join in the tunnel area to form one track, although the station access ramp is wide enough for the laying of a second track.

Signalling on the line is operated by the computer-based interlocking in Langenhagen, which is controlled by a dispatcher in Betriebszentrale Nord (Operations Centre North) in Hanover.

== Operations ==
Normally, the line is served by S5 services to Hamelin and Paderborn. During large fairs on the Hanover Fairground, S8 services also run to Hannover Messe/Laatzen station.

Trial operations had already taken place on the line by 3 March 2000.
