= Hannover Karl-Wiechert-Allee station =

Railway station in Hanover, Germany

Coordinates: 52°22′27″N 9°48′33″E

Hannover Karl-Wiechert-Allee
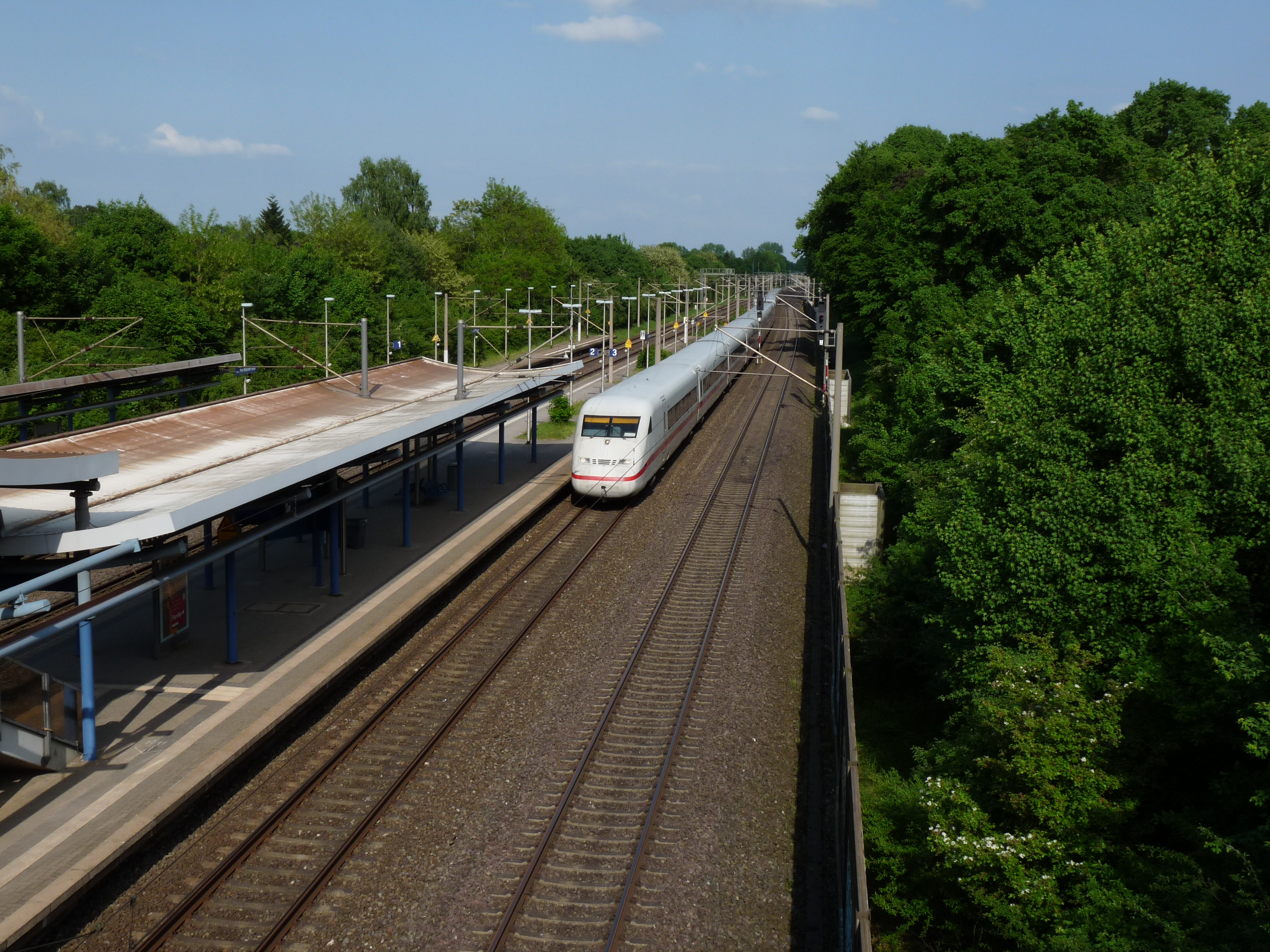
- 2018

General information
- Location: Karl-Wiechert-Allee; 30625 Hannover; Lower Saxony; Germany
- Owner: DB Netz
- Operator: DB Station&Service
- Lines: Hanover–Brunswick railway (KBS 310)
- Platforms: 1 island platform 1 side platform
- Tracks: 4
- Train operators: S-Bahn Hannover

Other information
- Station code: 7181
- DS100 code: HKWA
- IBNR: 8070086
- Category: 4
- Fare zone: GVH: A
- Website: www.bahnhof.de

Services
Preceding station	Hanover S-Bahn	Following station
Kleefeld towards Hannover Hbf	S 3	Anderten-Misburg towards Hildesheim Hbf
Hannover Hbf Terminus	S 6	Aligse towards Celle
Kleefeld towards Hannover Hbf	S 7	Anderten-Misburg towards Celle
Location
- Location within Lower Saxony

Hannover Karl-Wiechert-Allee is a railway station located in Heideviertel, Hannover, Germany. The station is located on the Hanover–Brunswick railway. The train services are operated by Deutsche Bahn as part of the Hanover S-Bahn.

== Train services ==
It is served by the S3, S6 and S7. It is also served by line 4 of the Hanover Stadtbahn.
