= Sarstedt station =

Railway station in Sarstedt, Germany

Sarstedt
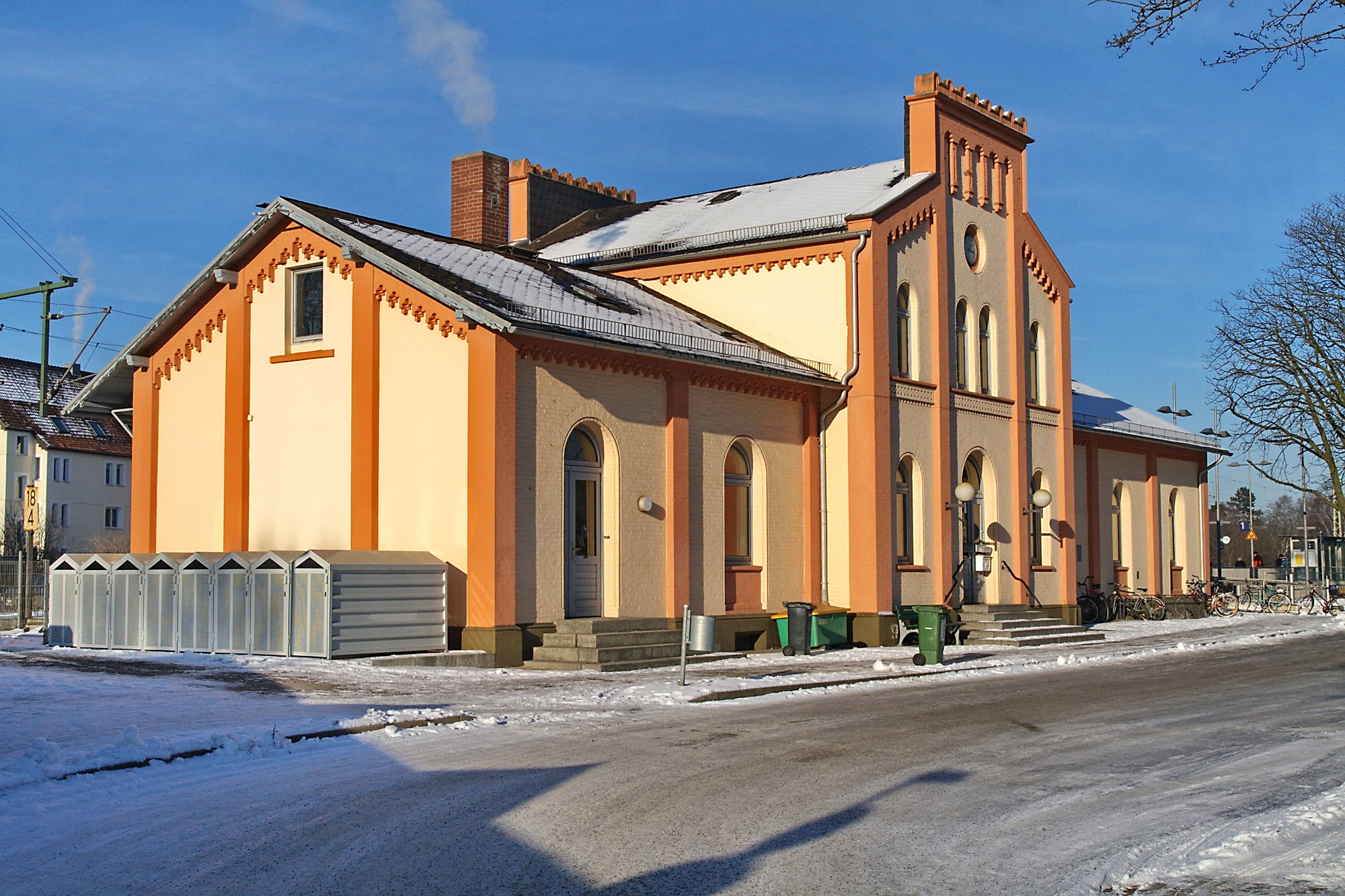
- Sarstedt railway station

General information
- Location: Sarstedt, Lower Saxony; Germany
- Coordinates: 52.2328°N 9.8429°E
- Owner: Deutsche Bahn
- Operator: DB Netz; DB Station&Service
- Line: Hanoverian Southern Railway
- Platforms: 2
- Connections: RE 2 RE 10; S 4; 201 211 212 213

Other information
- Fare zone: GVH: C

Services
Preceding station	Metronom	Following station
Hannover Hbf towards Uelzen	RE 2	Nordstemmen towards Göttingen
Preceding station		Following station
Hannover Hbf Terminus	RE 10	Hildesheim Hbf towards Bad Harzburg
Preceding station	Hanover S-Bahn	Following station
Rethen towards Bennemühlen	S 4	Barnten towards Hildesheim Hbf
Location

Sarstedt (German: Bahnhof Sarstedt) is a railway station located in Sarstedt, Germany. The station is located on the Hanoverian Southern Railway. The train services are operated by Deutsche Bahn, Metronom and Erixx. The station is also served by the Hanover S-Bahn.

== Train services ==
The following services currently call at the station:

- Regional services RE 2 Uelzen - Celle - Hannover - Barnten - Elze - Kreiensen - Northeim - Göttingen
- Regional services RE 10 Hannover - Hildesheim - Goslar - Bad Harzburg
- Hannover S-Bahn services S 4 Bennemühlen - Langenhagen - Hannover - Hannover Messe/Laatzen - Hildesheim
