= Hannover-Leinhausen station =

Railway station in Hanover, Germany

Hanover Leinhausen
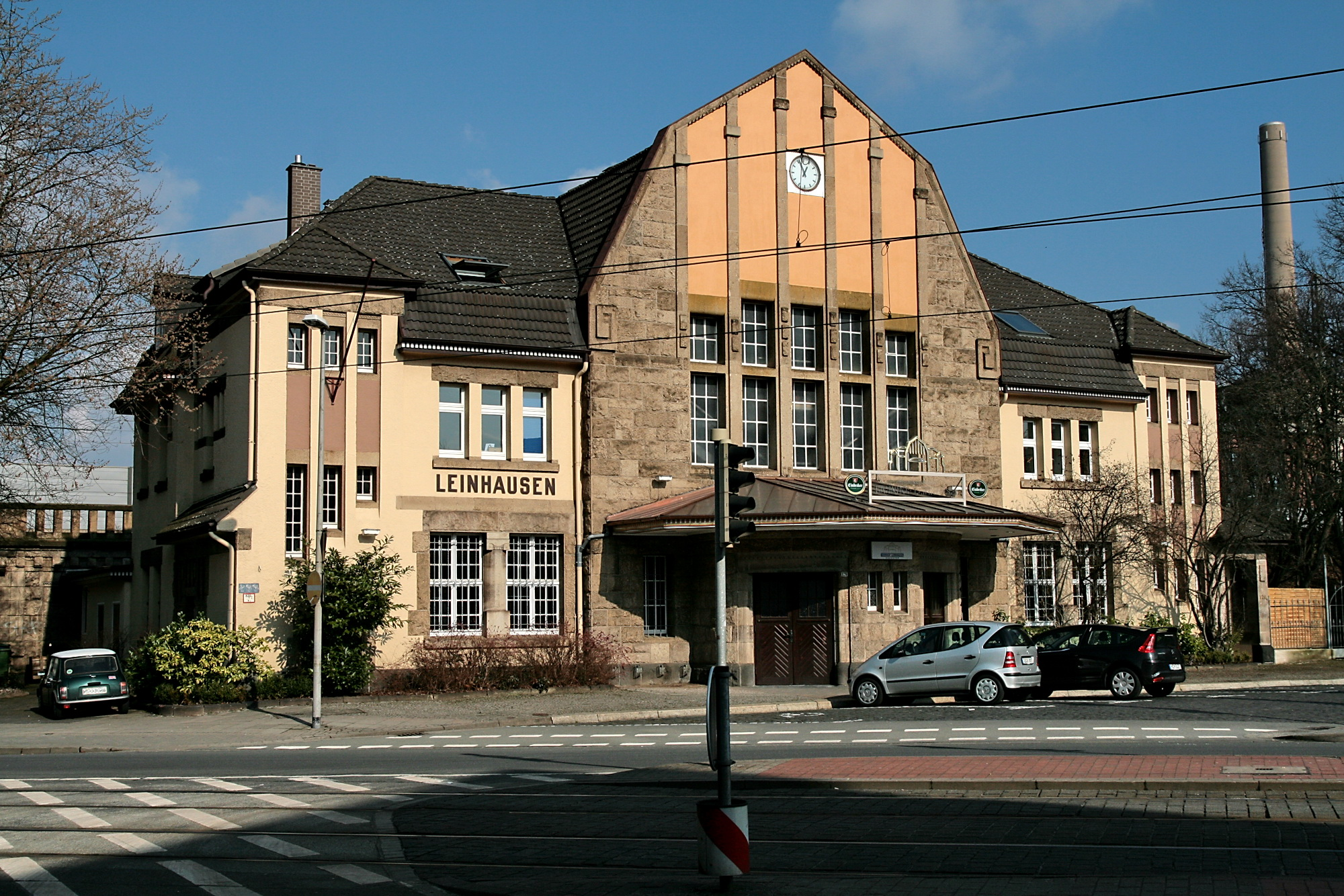
- Hanover-Leinhausen railway station

General information
- Location: Hanover, Lower Saxony; Germany
- Coordinates: 52.2348°N 9.4037°E
- Lines: Hanover–Minden railway Bremen–Hanover railway
- Platforms: 2

Other information
- Station code: 2550
- Category: 5
- Fare zone: GVH: A

Services
Preceding station	Hanover S-Bahn	Following station
Letter towards Minden (Westfalen)	S 1	Nordstadt towards Haste (Han)
Letter towards Nienburg (Weser)	S 2	Nordstadt towards Haste (Han)
Location

Hanover-Leinhausen is a railway station located in Hanover, Germany. The station is located on the Hanover–Minden railway, Bremen–Hanover railway. The train services are operated by Deutsche Bahn as part of the Hanover S-Bahn.

== Train services ==
The following services currently call at the station:

- Hanover S-Bahn services S1 Minden - Haste - Wunstorf - Hanover - Weetzen - Haste
- Hanover S-Bahn services S2 Nienburg - Wunstorf - Hanover - Weetzen - Haste

== Tram services ==
Hanover Stadtbahn lines 4 and 5 also serve the station.

- 4: Garbsen - Marienwerder Science Park - Leinhausen - Leibniz University - City Centre - Braunschweigerplatz - Karl-Wiechert-Allee - Roderbruch
- 5: Stöcken - Leinhausen - Leibniz University - City Centre - Braunschweigerplatz - Großer Hillen - Anderten
