= Hanover Airport station =

Railway station in Langenhagen, Germany

Hannover ✈ Flughafen
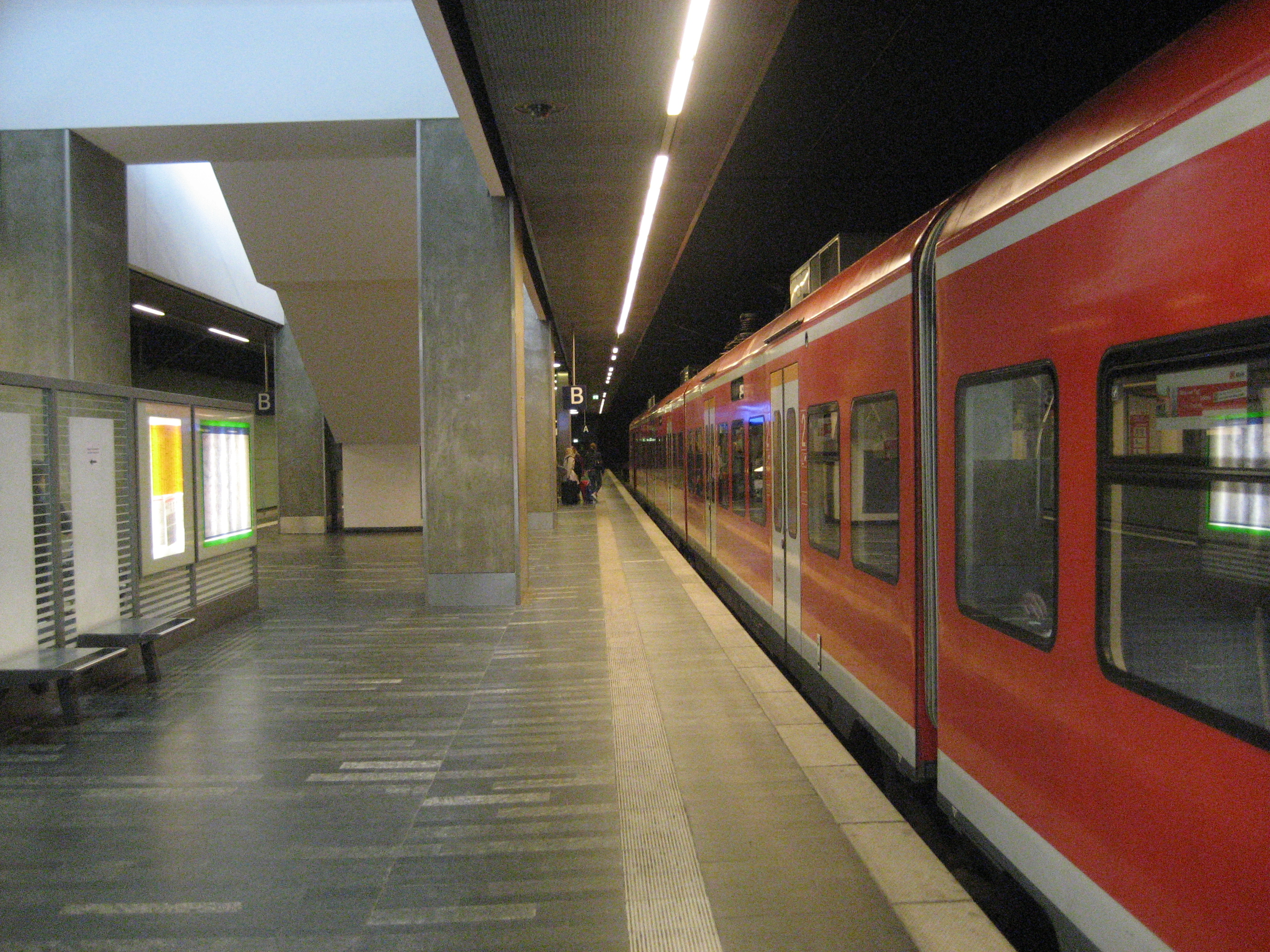
- Hanover Airport railway station

General information
- Location: Flughafenstr. 1, Hanover Airport, Lower Saxony; Germany
- Coordinates: 52.4585°N 9.6988°E
- Line: Langenhagen Pferdemarkt–Hanover Airport railway
- Platforms: 2

Other information
- Station code: 7180
- DS100 code: HLGF
- IBNR: 8000152
- Category: 4
- Fare zone: GVH: B
- Website: www.bahnhof.de

History
- Opened: 28 May 2000

Services
Preceding station	Hanover S-Bahn	Following station
Terminus	S 5	Langenhagen Pferdemarkt towards Paderborn Hbf
Terminus	S 8	Langenhagen Mitte towards Messe/Laatzen
Location

Hanover Airport (German: Bahnhof Hannover Flughafen) is a railway station located under the terminal of Hanover Airport, Germany. The station is located on a branch of the Heath Railway. The train services are operated by Deutsche Bahn as part of the Hanover S-Bahn.

== Train services ==
The following services currently call at the station:

- Hanover S-Bahn S5 Hanover Airport - Langenhagen - Hanover - Weetzen - Hameln - Paderborn
- Hanover S-Bahn S8 Hanover Airport - Langenhagen - Hanover - Hanover Messe/Laatzen

The S5 service provides a half-hourly service throughout the day, whilst the S8 operates only when there is a major event at the Messe (fair). Journey time between the airport and the city's main railway station (Hanover Hauptbahnhof) is 17 minutes.

== See also ==
- Rail transport in Germany
