= Letter station =

Railway station in Seelze, Germany

Coordinates: 52°23′39″N 9°38′26″E

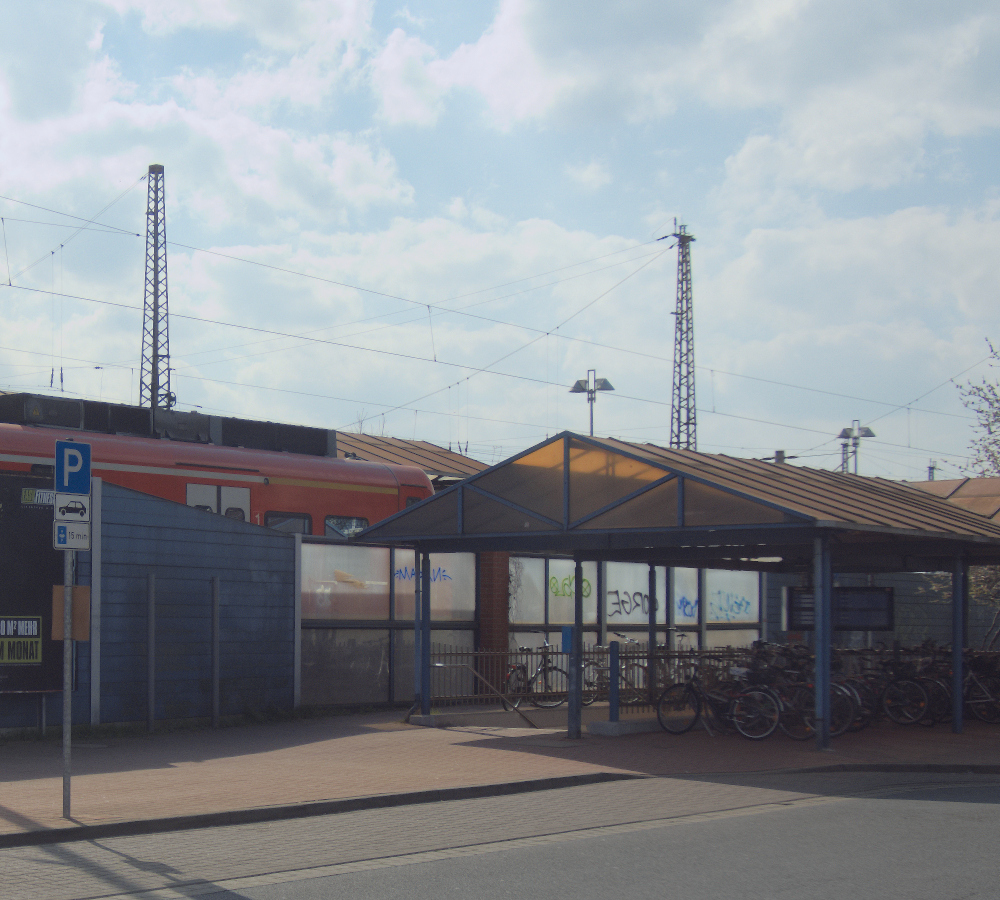
Letter station in 2019

Letter is a railway station located in Letter, Germany. The station is located on the Hanover–Minden railway and the Bremen–Hanover railway. The train services are operated by Deutsche Bahn as part of the Hanover S-Bahn. Letter is served by the S1 and S2. It is in the Umland zone of Hannover.

== Train services ==
The following services currently call at Letter:

| Preceding station | Hanover S-Bahn | Following station |
|---|---|---|
| Seelze towards Minden (Westfalen) | S 1 | Leinhausen towards Haste (Han) |
| Seelze towards Nienburg (Weser) | S 2 | Leinhausen towards Haste (Han) |
| Seelze Terminus | S 51 | Hannover Hbf towards Hameln |
