= Hanover S-Bahn =

Metro railway in Region Hannover, Germany

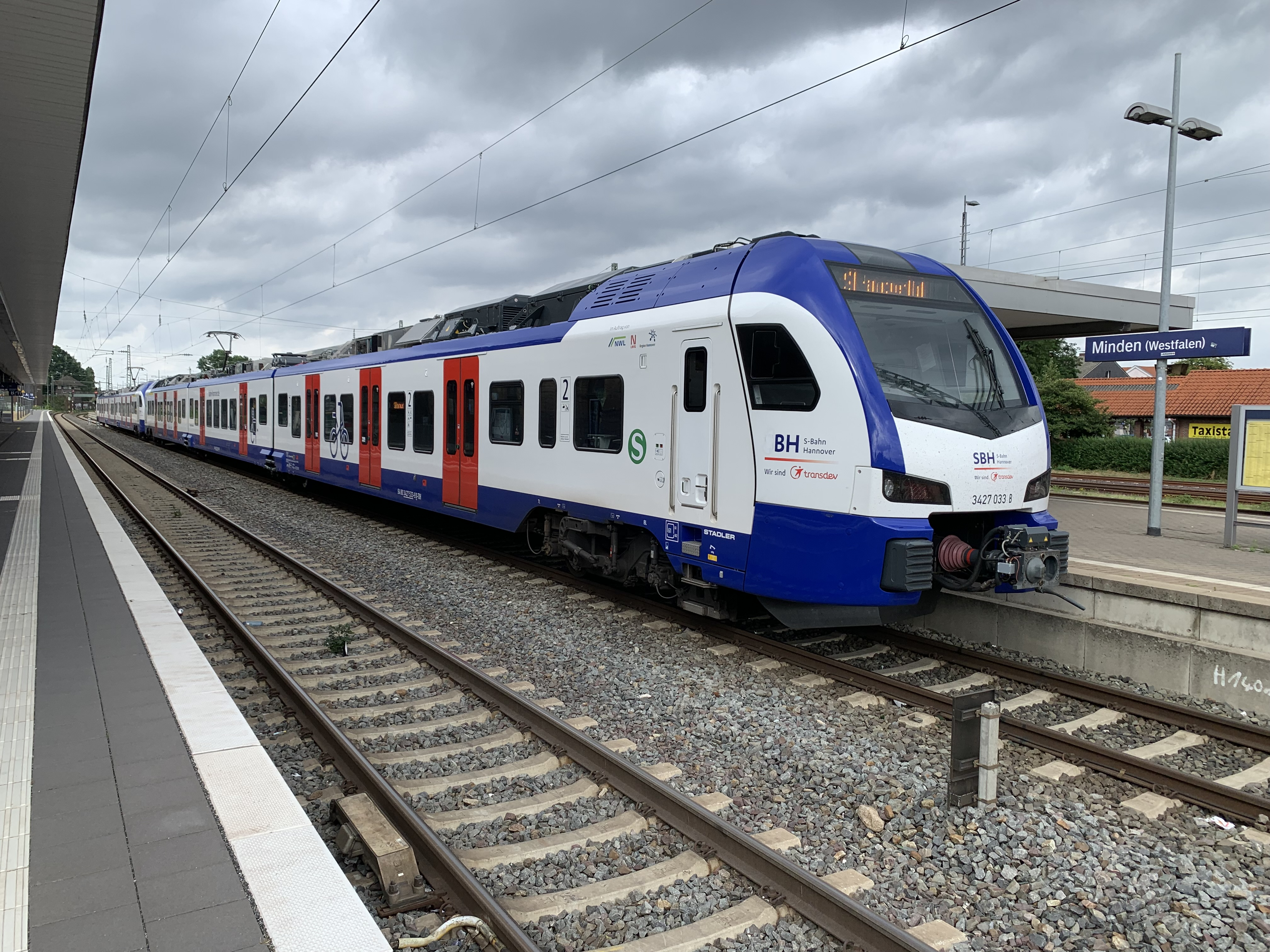
- Stadler Flirt at Minden

Overview
- Native name: S-Bahn Hannover
- Locale: Hannover, Lower Saxony, Germany
- Transit type: Commuter rail
- Number of lines: 10
- Number of stations: 74
- Annual ridership: 30 million
- Headquarters: Hannover, Germany
- Website: Hanover S-Bahn

Operation
- Began operation: 2000
- Operator: Transdev Hannover
- Number of vehicles: 68 (40×424, 28×425)
- Headway: 30 min.

Technical
- System length: 385 km (239 mi)
- Track gauge: 1,435 mm (4 ft 8 1/2 in) (standard gauge)
- Electrification: Overhead lines, 15 kV AC
System map

The Hanover S-Bahn (in German: S-Bahn Hannover) is an S-Bahn network operated by Transdev Hannover in the area of Hanover in the German state capital of Lower Saxony. It went operational shortly before Expo 2000 and is focused on the Hanover region, and also connects with adjacent districts (Celle, Hameln-Pyrmont, Hildesheim, Nienburg and Schaumburg), and into the state of North Rhine-Westphalia (Minden, Paderborn). The S-Bahn is an evolution of a suburban railway.

The S-Bahn has ten services in Hanover. It is distinguished from the Hannover Stadtbahn, which emerged from the Hannover tram network. In addition, there are other rail passenger services in the region composed of Regional-Express and Regionalbahn services. It is mainly operated with Class 424 electric multiple units.

The S5 line is in service 24/7 from Hannover Hauptbahnhof (central station) to Hannover Flughafen.

== History ==
In the 1960s there were plans to upgrade the rail network around Hanover. This led at first only to the establishment between 1965 and 1970 of regional commuter services on the east–west axis between Nienburg / Minden, Wunstorf, Hannover Hauptbahnhof (central station), Lehrte and Celle and on the Deister Railway. A further extension was omitted because of disagreement between federal, state and city region governments. In 1984, in preparation for the upgrading of the line between Wunstorf and Hannover, Seelze station was relocated and rebuilt with overtaking tracks. After Hanover won the right to build Expo 2000 in 1990, it was decided to bring forward the planned introduction of an S-Bahn network that was originally intended to be opened at a later date. On 12 November 1990 a development agreement was signed between the state of Lower Saxony, the Municipal Association of Greater Hannover and Deutsche Bundesbahn. In a relatively short time lines which for decades had remained virtually unchanged were upgraded considerably in and around Hanover.

Construction began with the new Hannover-Karl-Wiechert-Allee station on the Hannover–Braunschweig railway, which provides a connection to the Hannover Stadtbahn; the first pile for it was driven in 1993.

Two additional S-Bahn tracks were built on the western route from the Hauptbahnhof towards Wunstorf as far as Seelze from 1994, with services starting in 1997. In Leinhausen an extensive flying junction was built; this separates regional and long distance traffic running to and from the north and west. The S-Bahn runs over the old freight tracks in Hainholz and through the former main freight yard. This included the new Hannover-Nordstadt S-Bahn station, which replaced the existing suburban station of Hannover-Hainholz.

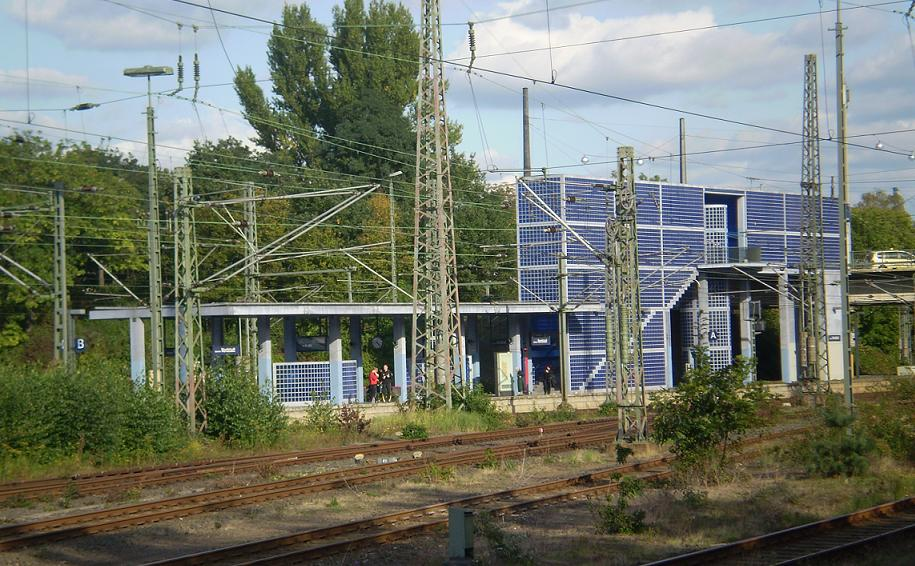
Hannover-Nordstadt station

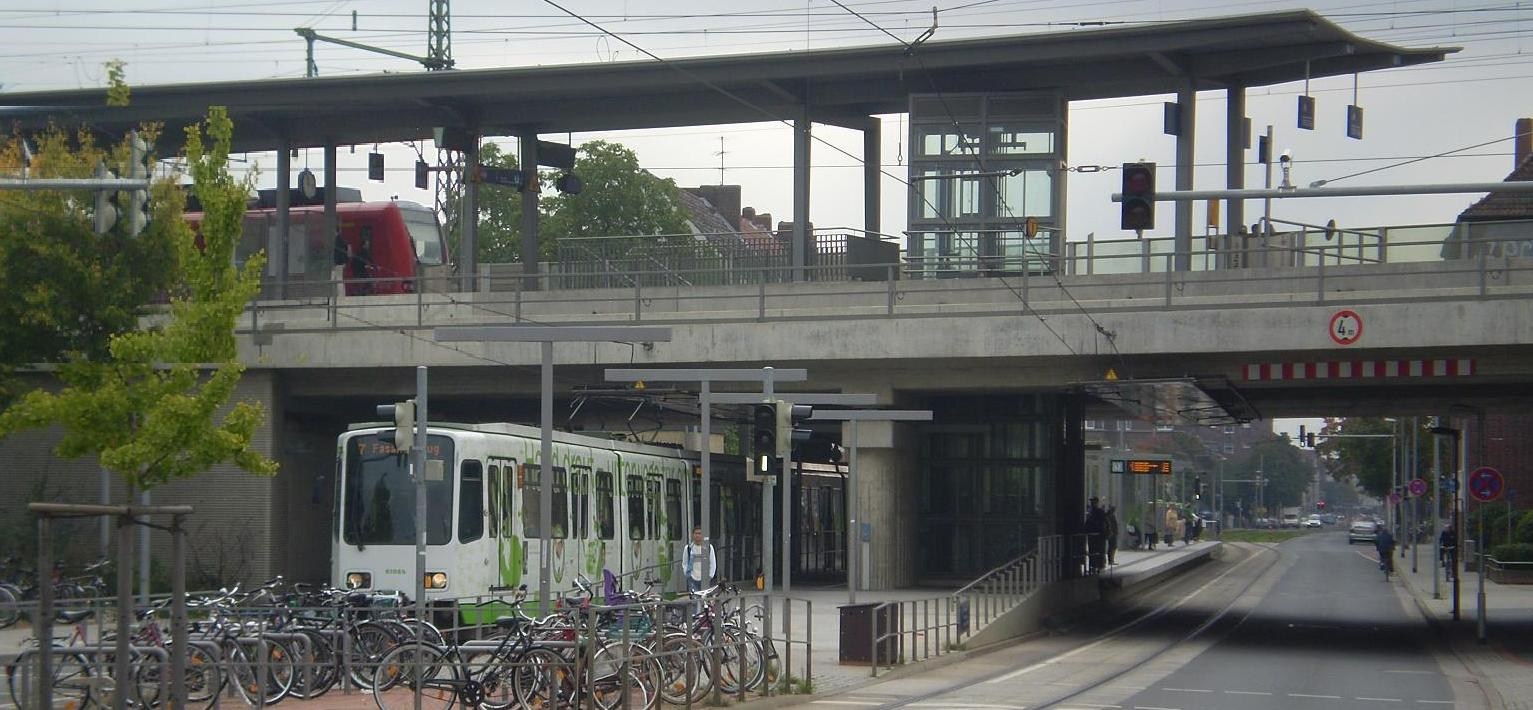
Hannover-Linden/Fischerhof station (S-Bahn above, Stadtbahn under)

Two additional tracks were laid for the S-Bahn on the line north to Langenhagen. On this line, Hannover-Herrenhausen station was replaced by the new S-Bahn station at Hannover-Ledeburg. The route was also electrified as far as Bennemühlen and in addition was doubled as far as Bissendorf. Hannover-Langenhagen Airport was connected by a local service for the first time, via the former goods track. From 1995, this line was electrified and extended through a tunnel to the airport's Terminal C, which was then under construction.

In the east the line was extended as a single track as far as the previously established station at Karl-Wiechert-Allee and operations on it started in 1999. Two additional S-Bahn tracks were then added almost to Ahlten, continuing to Lehrte as a single track; being brought into service in June 2000. This extension was part of the German Unity transport projects (Verkehrsprojekte Deutsche Einheit).

To the south an additional track was built, starting in 1996, between Hannover-Bismarckstrasse and the northern end of Hannover-Wülfel station to serve the completely reorganised Hannover Messe/Laatzen station.

On the Deister Railway a 10 km (6.2 mi) long section of double track was built between Lemmie and Egestorf to the west of the Weetzen level crossing in order to avoid delays due to conflicting train movements.

Stations were rebuilt where necessary to make them fully accessible for the disabled. Most construction projects were completed in time for Expo 2000, so since then Hanover has had an extensive network. For time and cost reasons, the conversion of some stations was not started before the Expo. The implementation of these modifications is still partly unfinished.

After the end of the Expo there were changes so that normal operation started on the route network. The network was extended via the Deister Railway to Barsinghausen, Bad Nenndorf and Haste and also via Springe to Hamelin. It was later extended to Bad Pyrmont and to Paderborn in North Rhine-Westphalia. Exceptionally, the service on the section from Bad Pyrmont to Paderborn, which is the furthest from Hannover, is less frequent and resembles a Regionalbahn service. All other routes, nearer the city, benefit from a full S-Bahn service.

On 14 December 2008 the S-Bahn was extended to replace three former Regionalbahn and Regional-Express services to Hildesheim and Celle. As a result, Hannover Messe/Laatzen station was included in the regular S-Bahn network.

In November 2018, French operator Transdev was awarded the contract, worth about €1.5 billion, to operate the S-Bahn from December 2021 until June 2034.

== Routes ==
The Hannover S-Bahn serves 12 stations within Hanover and connects the state capital with suburbs and other towns in the area.

Line	Route	Service interval (mins)	Railways	Remarks
S 1	Minden - Bückeburg - Kirchhorsten - Stadthagen - Lindhorst - Haste (Han) - Wunstorf - Dedensen-Gümmer - Seelze - Letter - Leinhausen - Nordstadt - Hannover Hbf - Bismarckstraße - Linden/Fischerhof - Bornum - Empelde - Ronnenberg - Weetzen - Lemmie - Wennigsen - Egestorf - Kirchdorf - Barsinghausen - Winninghausen - Bantorf - Bad Nenndorf - Haste (Han)	60	Hanover–Minden; Hanover–Altenbeken; Deister Railway	Train number change in H-Hbf; 30 minute service interval combined with S 2 between Wunstorf and Haste
S 2	Nienburg - Linsburg - Hagen (Han) - Eilvese - Neustadt am Rübenberge - Poggenhagen - Wunstorf - Dedensen-Gümmer - Seelze - Letter - Leinhausen - Nordstadt - Hannover Hbf - Bismarckstraße - Linden/Fischerhof - Bornum - Empelde - Ronnenberg - Weetzen - Lemmie - Wennigsen - Egestorf - Kirchdorf - Barsinghausen - Winninghausen - Bantorf - Bad Nenndorf - Haste (Han)	60	Bremen–Hannover; Hanover–Altenbeken; Deister Railway	30 minute service interval combined with S 1 between Wunstorf and Haste; On Sundays, Nienburg–Hanover only
S 3	Hannover Hbf - Kleefeld - Karl-Wiechert-Allee - Anderten-Misburg - Ahlten - Lehrte - Sehnde - Algermissen - Harsum - Hildesheim Hbf	60	Lehrte–Nordstemmen; Hanover–Braunschweig	30 minute service interval in combination with S 7 between Lehrte and Hanover
S 4	Bennemühlen - Mellendorf - Bissendorf - Langenhagen-Kaltenweide - Langenhagen Pferdemarkt - Langenhagen Mitte - Vinnhorst - Ledeburg - Nordstadt - Hannover Hbf - Bismarckstraße - Messe/Laatzen - Rheten - Sarstedt - Barnten - Emmerke - Hildesheim Hbf	30 (60)	Lehrte–Nordstemmen; Hanoverian Southern Railway; Heath Railway	1x per hour Bennemühlen–Hildesheim, 1x per hour Bennemühlen–Hannover
S 5	Flughafen - Langenhagen Pferdemarkt - Langenhagen Mitte - Vinnhorst - Ledeburg - Nordstadt - Hannover Hbf - Bismarckstraße - Linden/Fischerhof - Weetzen - Holtensen/Linderte - Bennigsen - Völksen/Eldagsen - Springe - Bad Münder - Hameln - Emmerthal - Bad Pyrmont - Lügde - Schieder - Steinheim - Altenbeken - Paderborn Hbf	30 (60)	Hamm–Warburg; Hannover–Altenbeken; Hanover–Hamburg; Langenhagen Pferdemarkt–Flughafen	1x per hour Hannover Airport–Paderborn, 1x per hour Hannover Airport–Hameln
S 51	Hannover Hbf - Bismarckstraße - Linden/Fischerhof - Springe - Hameln	60	Hannover–Altenbeken; Hannover–Minden	HVZ sprinter line, stops only at a few stations Mon-Fri seven train pairs daily
S 6	Hannover Hbf - Karl-Wiechert-Allee - Aligse - Burgdorf - Otze - Ehlershausen - Celle	60	Lehrte–Celle; Hannover–Brunswick	Does not stop at H-Kleefeld, H-Anderten/Misburg, Ahlten
S 7	Hannover Hbf - Kleefeld - Karl-Wiechert-Allee - Anderten-Misburg - Ahlten - Lehrte - Aligse - Burgdorf - Otze - Ehlershausen - Celle	60	Lehrte–Celle; Hanover–Brunswick	Every 30 minutes combined with S 3 (Lehrte – Hanover); Every 30 minutes combined with S 6 (Celle – Aligse)
S 8	Flughafen - Langenhagen Mitte - Nordstadt - Hannover Hbf - Bismarckstraße - Messe/Laatzen		Hannover–Hamburg; Hanoverian Southern Railway	As required for Fair traffic

== Lines ==
Trains run as a rule at hourly intervals. Lines S 4 and S 5 operate at half-hourly intervals on one leg each. Operation of at least two S-Bahn lines on the main routes in the core area of the network means that these routes have a half-hourly service. Line S 5 runs at 2 hour intervals on Sundays on the section in North Rhine-Westphalia (Bad Pyrmont–Paderborn).

== Rolling stock ==
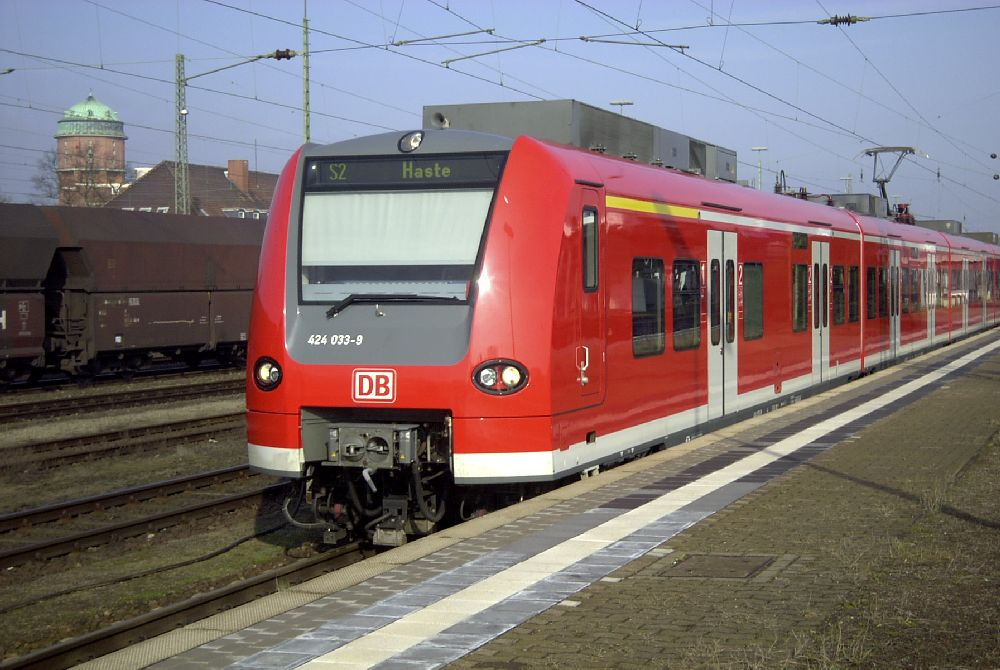
Class 424 electric multiple unit in Nienburg station

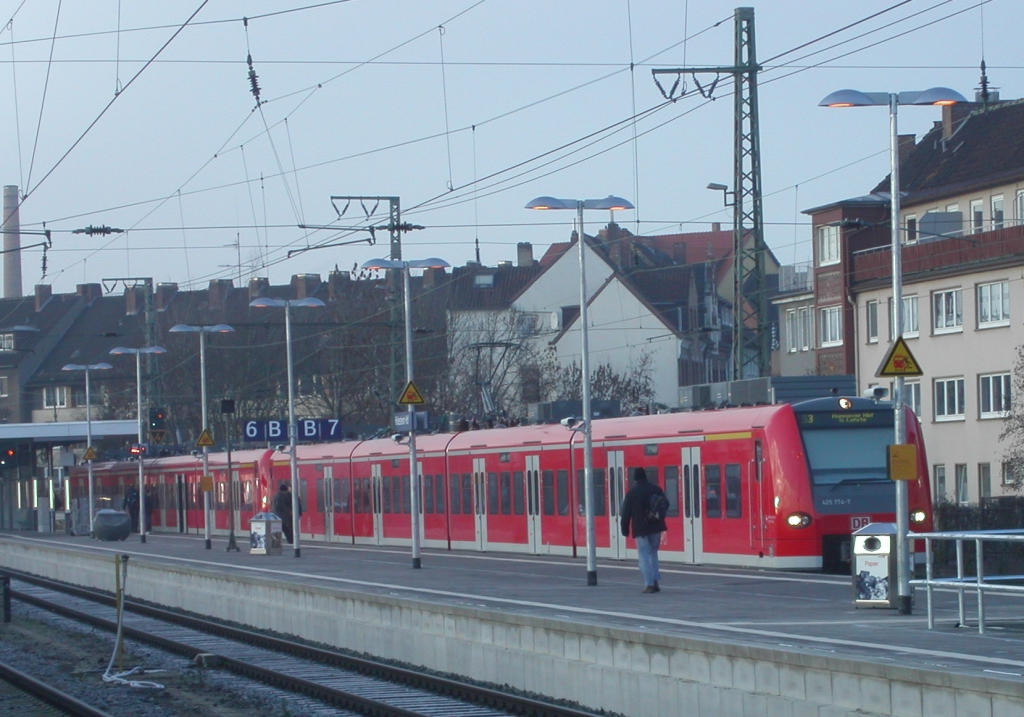
Class 425 electric multiple unit on the opening day of the S-Bahn in Hildesheim

40 Class 424 electric multiple units were acquired especially for the Hanover S-Bahn. These differ from the vehicles of class 423, as they have a lower floor height of 80 cm, fewer doors and include toilets. Although delivery began as early as 1998, the class 424 trains were not yet ready for the opening of the S-Bahn network at the start the Expo 2000 due to technical problems. Deutsche Bahn therefore had to temporarily borrow class 423 rolling stock from the Munich S-Bahn.

In addition there are six vehicles of class 425 (425 150–425 155), which were retrofitted with adjustable steps to allow access to lower platforms, without sacrificing barrier-free access to high platforms. On the S 5 to Paderborn these vehicles are coupled with the class 424 vehicles and run from Hameln uncoupled to Paderborn. In this section, there are lower platforms.

In 2008, 13 vehicles of class 425.2 were procured (425 271–425 283), for the new and upgraded lines to Hildesheim and Celle as it was decided not to produce a new batch of class 424 vehicles.

Upon taking control of S-Bahn operations in 2021, Transdev plans to operate 64 Stadler Rail EMUs on the network, primarily newbuild FLIRT units, and 13 class 425 EMUs on the network.

== See also ==
- Rail transport in Germany
