= Hannover Messe/Laatzen station =

Railway station in Hanover, Germany

Hannover Messe/Laatzen
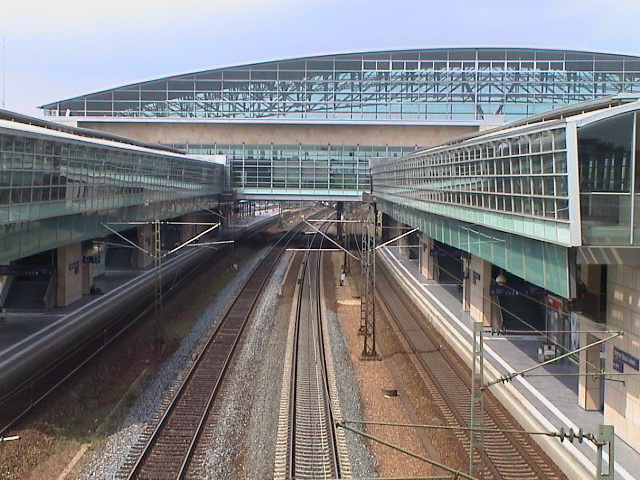
- Station

General information
- Location: Münchner Str. 2, Laatzen, Lower Saxony; Germany
- Coordinates: 52°19′02″N 9°47′33″E
- Lines: Hanoverian Southern Railway (KBS 350); Hanover–Würzburg HSL
- Platforms: 6

Construction
- Accessible: Yes

Other information
- Station code: 3488
- DS100 code: HHML
- IBNR: 8003487
- Category: 4
- Fare zone: GVH: B
- Website: www.bahnhof.de

History
- Opened: 2000

Services
Preceding station	Hanover S-Bahn	Following station
Bismarckstraße towards Bennemühlen	S 4	Rethen towards Hildesheim Hbf
Bismarckstraße towards Flughafen	S 8	Terminus
Location
- Location within Lower Saxony Location within Germany Location within Europe

Hannover Messe/Laatzen station is a Category 4 station in the German town of Laatzen near the Hanover fairground (German: Messegelände Hannover). It is normally served only by the Hanover S-Bahn. During major events such as CeBIT and Hanover Messe, all passing regional and long distance trains stop at the station. The station opened in 2000, replacing the old Messe station, which was located on a spur line in the fairgrounds.

== History ==
The station was built for Expo 2000. It replaced Messe station at Laatzen, which was built in 1977 during the construction of the Hanover–Würzburg high-speed line, which had in turn replaced the former suburban railway station of Hannover-Wülfel on the Hanoverian Southern Railway.

The Hannover-Messe station was a terminal station on the fairground site that it served until 1998, having been expanded again in 1988.

The new station was designed following a competition for planning ideas advertised throughout Europe. It was officially open on 22 March 2000. The first of two stages went into operation in the spring of 1998, following the start of construction in 1996. A total of €200 million was invested in the project, which included the installation of 30 new sets of points and 61 additional signals. As part of Expo 2000 133,000 passengers per day were expected to travel to and from the site in 300 long distance and regional trains and 250 S-Bahn trains.

A 60 m-long (200 ft) and 36 m-wide (118 ft) concrete bridge spans across the tracks, which is covered by a roof supported by curved steel trusses. This gives access to the platforms via covered fingers, which serve as roofs to the platform and have several exits to it.

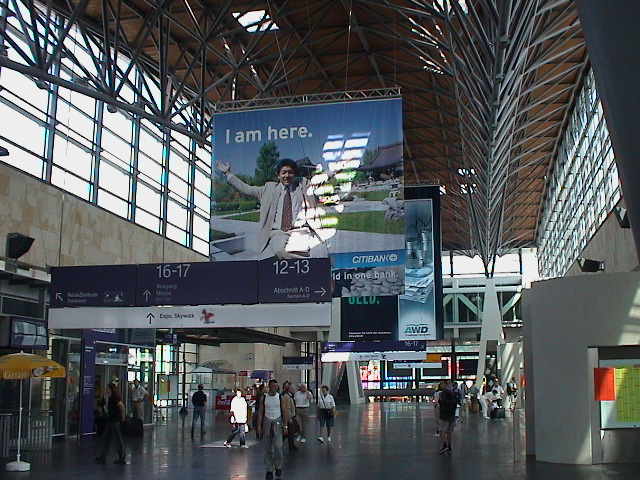
Station hall during Expo 2000

The Messe station has two 420 m-long (1,380 ft) and 9-metre-wide (30 ft) long-distance platforms serving four running lines and a 210 m-long (690 ft) terminal platform with two tracks for the S-Bahn line, which ends there. Two other non-stop tracks for the Hanover–Würzburg high-speed line run between the tracks serving the long-distance platforms.

During Expo 2000 there was a temporary Terminal B located northeast of the station on the existing tracks; this was used as a terminus for services to and from the north and east. These platforms were dismantled after Expo 2000 finished.

== Normal Operations ==
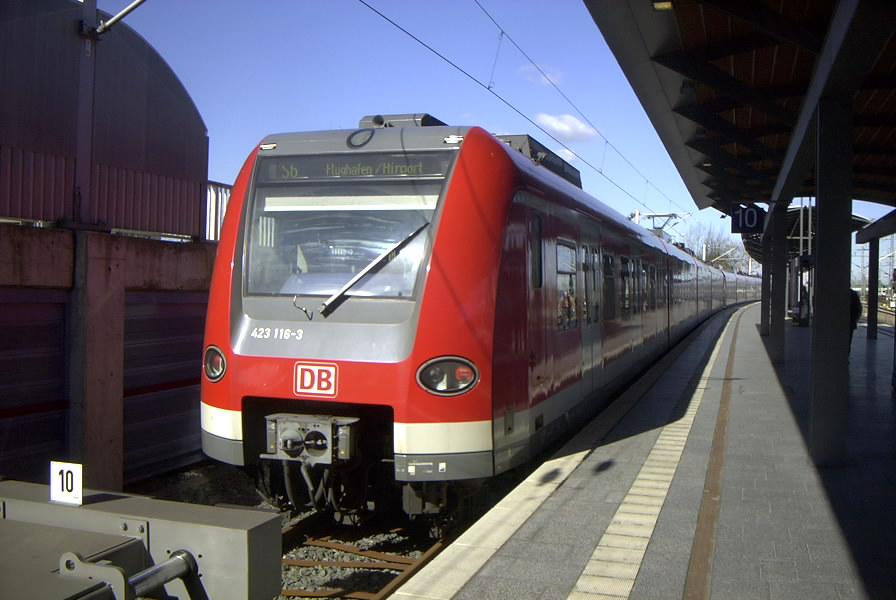
S-Bahn service of class 423 at the terminating platform

Hannover-Messe/Laatzen station has been served since December 2008 by the S-Bahn, with services running every hour on line 4. Previously it had been served by an hourly Regionalbahn services on the Hanover–Hildesheim route and a two hourly metronom service on the Uelzen–Hanover–Göttingen route. Since 10 December 2017, LOC 1818 and LOC 1819 of the private operator Locomore has also stopped at this station. Locomore connects the Hanover region with Berlin, Frankfurt and Stuttgart.

Line	Route	Interval
S 4	Hildesheim – Sarstedt – Hannover Messe/Laatzen – Hanover – Langenhagen – Bennemühlen	60 min

== Operations during major trade fairs ==
When major trade fairs like CeBIT and Hannover Messe are open, the station also serves as a long-distance station, giving a direct connection to the fairgrounds (CeBIT 2010 was served daily for up to 72 Intercity-Express and 15 Intercity trains and additional regional trains). S-Bahn line 4 towards Bennemühlen is reinforced so that it runs at 30-minute intervals. Furthermore, S-Bahn line 8 operates as a direct connection via Hannover Hauptbahnhof to Hannover airport.

Line	Route	Interval
ICE/ECE 20	(Kiel) – Hamburg – Hanover – Hannover Messe/Laatzen – Göttingen – Frankfurt – Mannheim – Karlsruhe – Freiburg – Basel SBB (– Zürich – Interlaken Ost)	120 min
ICE 22	(Kiel) – Hamburg – Hannover – Hannover Messe/Laatzen – Göttingen – Frankfurt – Frankfurt Flughafen – Mannheim (– Heidelberg) – Stuttgart	120 min
ICE 25	(Lübeck) – Hamburg – Hannover – Hannover Messe/Laatzen – Göttingen – Fulda – Würzburg – Nuremberg – Ingolstadt – Munich (– Garmisch-Partenkirchen)	60 min
ICE 26	Bremen – Hannover – Hannover Messe/Laatzen – Göttingen – Frankfurt – Heidelberg – Karlsruhe	120 min
RE 2	Uelzen – Celle – Hanover – Hannover Messe/Laatzen – Sarstedt – Nordstemmen – Elze – Kreiensen – Göttingen	60 min
RE 10	Hannover – Hannover Messe/Laatzen – Hildesheim – Derneburg – Salzgitter-Ringelheim – Goslar – Bad Harzburg	60 min
S 8	Hannover Flughafen – Langenhagen – Hannover – Hannover Messe/Laatzen	30/60 min

== Connections ==
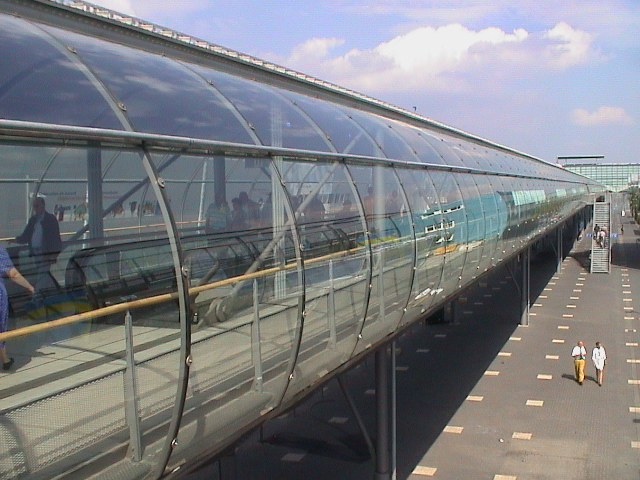
Skywalk to the exhibition ground

The 340-metre-long skywalk bridge connects the station and the fair ground. This is an elevated double tube in which two parallel walkways allow a rapid, two-way and all-weather pedestrian link.

There is a link to the Laatzen/Birkenstraße station on the Hanover Stadtbahn lines 1 and 2, which is located about 200 metres away on Hildesheimer Straße. Next to the station is a stop on bus routes 340 and 341, which only run hourly.

== See also ==
- Rail transport in Germany
- Railway stations in Germany
