= Hildesheim Hauptbahnhof =

Railway station in Hildesheim, Germany

Hildesheim Hbf
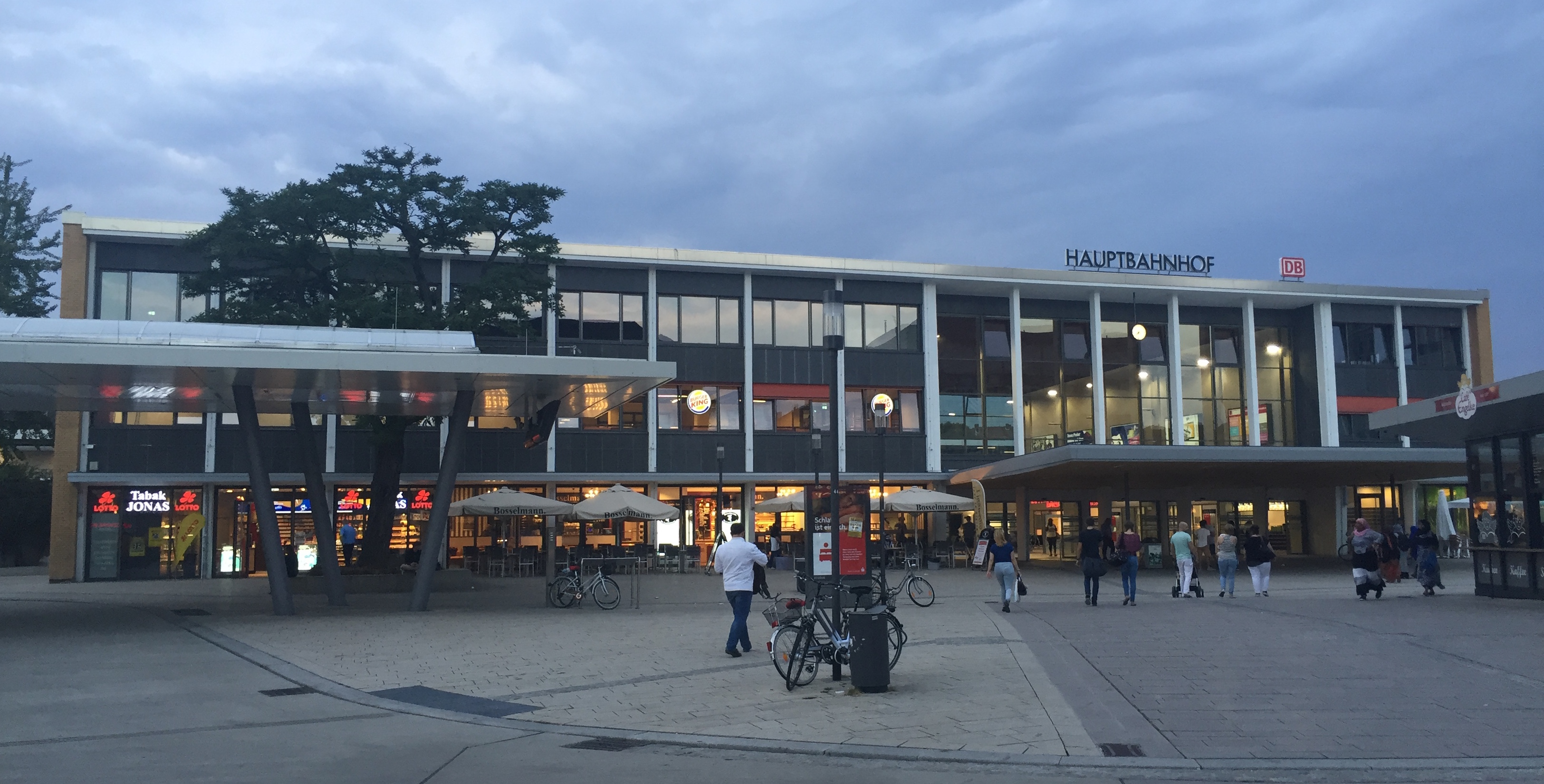
- Station forecourt in August 2016

General information
- Location: Bahnhofsplatz 1, Hildesheim, Lower Saxony; Germany
- Coordinates: 52°9′38″N 9°57′14″E
- Elevation: 87 m (285 ft)
- Owner: Deutsche Bahn
- Operator: DB Netz; DB Station&Service
- Lines: Lehrte–Nordstemmen (1770); Hildesheim–Brunswick (1772); Hildesheim–Goslar (1773); Hildesheim loop (1774)
- Platforms: 9

Construction
- Accessible: Yes

Other information
- Station code: 2765
- DS100 code: HHI
- IBNR: 8000169
- Category: 2
- Fare zone: ROSA: 100 (ROSA tickets accepted on RB79); GVH: D (ROSA transitional tariff, monthly passes only)
- Website: www.bahnhof.de

History
- Opened: 1846 (first station); 1884 (second station); 1961 (current station building)

Services
Preceding station	DB Fernverkehr	Following station
Göttingen towards Brig, Chur or Interlaken Ost	ICE 12	Braunschweig Hbf towards Berlin Ostbahnhof
Göttingen towards Frankfurt Airport, Frankfurt (Main) Hbf, Karlsruhe Hbf or Stuttgart Hbf	ICE 13	Braunschweig Hbf towards Berlin Ostbahnhof
Preceding station		Following station
Sarstedt towards Hannover Hbf	RE 10	Hildesheim Ost towards Bad Harzburg
Preceding station	Metronom	Following station
Terminus	RE 50	Hoheneggelsen towards Wolfsburg Hbf
Preceding station	Start	Following station
Emmerke towards Herford	RB 77	Terminus
Terminus	RB 79	Hildesheim Ost towards Bodenburg
Preceding station	Hanover S-Bahn	Following station
Harsum towards Hannover Hbf	S 3	Terminus
Emmerke towards Bennemühlen	S 4	Terminus
Location

Hildesheim Hauptbahnhof (German for Hildesheim Central Station) is the main railway station for the city of Hildesheim in Lower Saxony, Germany. The station opened in 1961 and is located on the Lehrte–Nordstemmen, Hildesheim–Brunswick and Hildesheim–Goslar railway. The train services are operated by DB Fernverkehr, Erixx, Metronom and NordWestBahn.

== History ==
The first Hildesheim station was opened by the Royal Hanoverian State Railways as the terminus of the Lehrte–Nordstemmen line—the southern arm of its Cross railway—on 12 July 1846 to the north of the present Kaiserstraße, near the current Bahnhofsallee. After the opening of the Hanoverian Southern Railway the Cross railway was extended on 15 September 1853 to Nordstemmen Station on the Southern Railway. The reception building of the first Hildesheim railway station was a half-timbered building with a slate roof.

The Hanover-Altenbeken Railway Company (German: Hannover-Altenbekener Eisenbahn-Gesellschaft, HAE) was planning to build a rail line from Löhne to Vienenburg, through Hildesheim. Since it became insolvent before the completion of the line, Magdeburg-Halberstädt Railway Company (German: Magdeburg-Halberstädter Eisenbahn-Gesellschaft, MHE) took over the construction of the line as well as the management of the HAE. It opened the line from Hildesheim to Vienenburg on 19 May 1875 and on 1 May 1883 the Brunswick Railway (German: Braunschweigischen Eisenbahn) opened a branch to Goslar, now part of the Hildesheim–Goslar line.

For the additional traffic the HAE built a second track from Nordstemmen to Hildesheim, but at first it had to build a temporary station, the current Hildesheim Ost station, because it was not allowed to use the existing station. Only after the nationalisation of the HAE and its parent the MHE did trains begin to stop at the main railway station on 20 May 1880.

Even without the additional traffic the original station was already too small, and so, after long negotiations with the city it was agreed to build a new station further north. On 4 May 1884, the new station was opened to a design by Hubert Stier in a neo-renaissance style. The old station building was taken apart and rebuilt as Dissen-Bad Rothenfelde station, which still stands. In 1888, the single-track line to Brunswick was opened for long-distance trains running east to Magdeburg and Berlin.

Although the station building was only slightly damaged in the bombing of Hildesheim on 22 March 1945, it was demolished in 1959. In 1961 the station received a new station building in the functional style of the time. The buildings on its island platform were then removed.

The Nordstemmen–Lehrte line was electrified on 29 May 1965 and the line to Brunswick has been worked by electric trains since 30 May 1976. The Hanover–Würzburg high-speed line was connected to Hildesheim by the Hildesheim loop in 1991. Since December 2008, Hildesheim Hauptbahnhof is located on the network of the Hanover S-Bahn. S-Bahn trains leave every hour for Hannover Hauptbahnhof via both Barnten and Sarstedt (S4) and Lehrte (S3). In preparation the platforms of tracks 4/5 and 6/7 were completely renovated in 2008.

The lobby of the Train station was renovated from 2013 to 2016. The original completion was mid 2015, but the renovation caused many problems and was moved to mid 2016.

== Train services ==
The station is served by the following services:

=== Long-distance ===
Line	Route			Frequency
ICE 12	Switzerland – Basel – Freiburg – Karlsruhe – Mannheim – Frankfurt – Kassel – Hildesheim – Braunschweig – Wolfsburg – Berlin – Berlin Ostbahnhof			Every two hours
ICE 13	Stuttgart –	Heidelberg – Darmstadt –	Frankfurt South – Kassel – Hildesheim – Braunschweig – Wolfsburg – Berlin – Berlin Ostbahnhof	Every 2 hours
ICE 13	Karlsruhe –	Heidelberg – Darmstadt –	Frankfurt South – Kassel – Hildesheim – Braunschweig – Wolfsburg – Berlin – Berlin Ostbahnhof	Every 2 hours
ICE 13	Frankfurt Airport –		Frankfurt South – Kassel – Hildesheim – Braunschweig – Wolfsburg – Berlin – Berlin Ostbahnhof	Every 2 hours

=== Regional ===
Line	Route	Interval (min)	Operator
RE 10	Hannover – Hildesheim – Salzgitter-Ringelheim – Goslar – Bad Harzburg	60	erixx
RE 50	Hildesheim – Braunschweig – Wolfsburg	60	metronom
RB 77	Hildesheim – Hamelin – Löhne – Herford	60	Regionalverkehre Start Deutschland
RB 79	Hildesheim – Bad Salzdetfurth – Bodenburg	60	Regionalverkehre Start Deutschland

=== S-Bahn ===
Since December 2008, Hildesheim Hauptbahnhof has been connected to the Hannover S-Bahn. Hourly S-Bahn trains run to Hannover Hauptbahnhof both via Barnten and Sarstedt (S4) and via Lehrte (S3). The platforms of tracks 4/5 and 6/7 were completely rebuilt in 2008 in preparation.

Line	Route	Interval (min)
S 3	Hildesheim – Sehnde – Lehrte – Hannover	60
S 4	Hildesheim – Sarstedt – Hannover Messe/Laatzen – Hannover – Langenhagen – Bennemühlen	60

== See also ==
- Rail transport in Germany
- Railway stations in Germany
