= Bennemühlen station =

Railway station in Wedemark, Germany

Bennemühlen
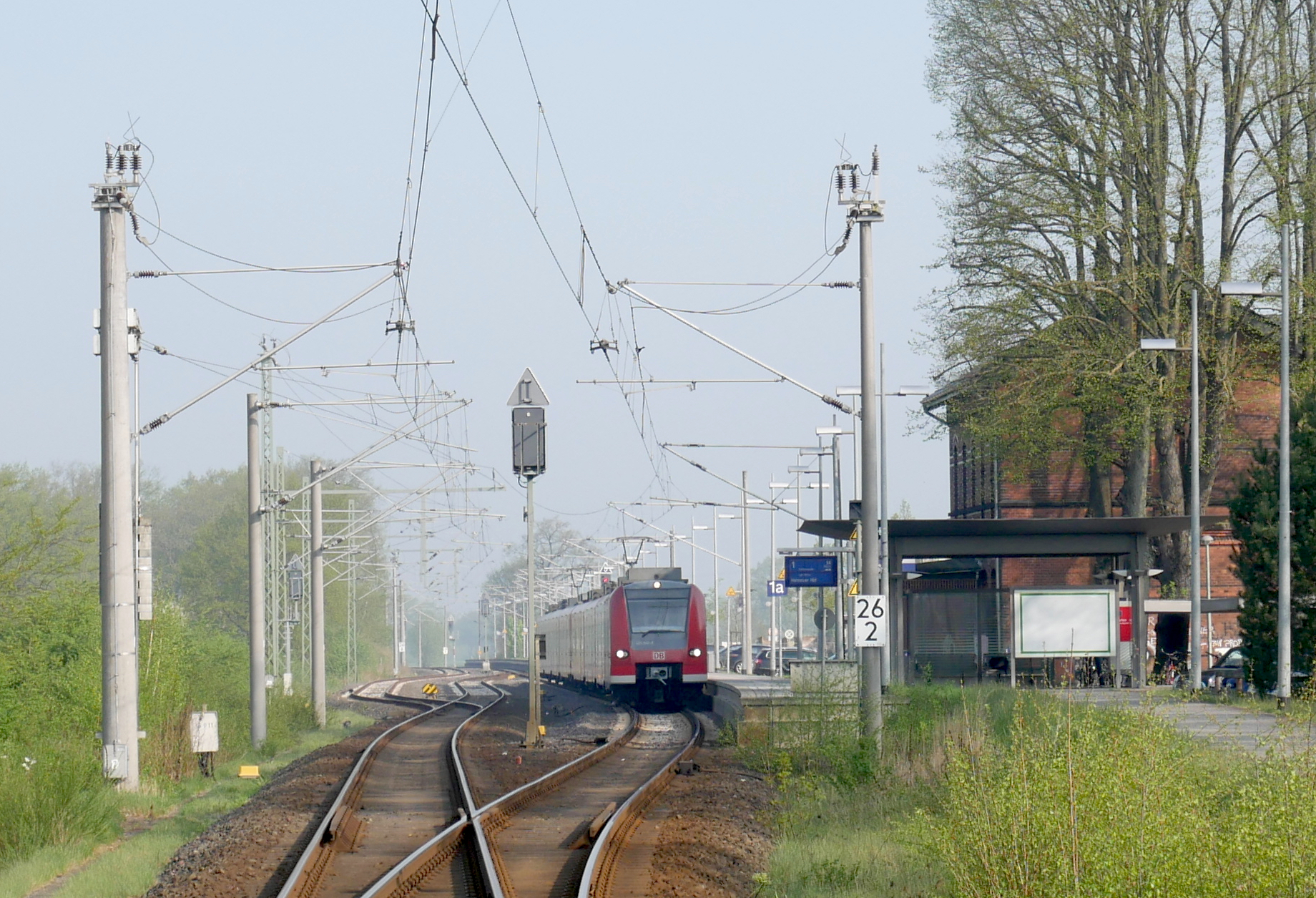
- 2018

General information
- Location: Am Bahnhof 1; 30900 Bennemühlen; Lower Saxony; Germany
- Coordinates: 52.5804°N 9.7275°E
- Elevation: 40 m (130 ft)
- Owner: DB Netz
- Operator: DB Station&Service
- Lines: Heath Railway (KBS 123)
- Platforms: 1 side platform
- Tracks: 3
- Train operators: DB Regio Nord

Construction
- Parking: yes
- Cycle facilities: yes
- Accessible: yes

Other information
- Station code: 482
- DS100 code: HBML
- IBNR: 8000871
- Category: 5
- Fare zone: GVH: C
- Website: www.bahnhof.de

Services
Preceding station	Hanover S-Bahn	Following station
Terminus	S 4	Mellendorf towards Hildesheim Hbf
Location
- Location within Lower Saxony Location within Germany Location within Europe

Bennemühlen station is a railway station in the municipality of Bennemühlen, located in the Hanover Region district in Lower Saxony, Germany.
