= Heath Railway =

Railway line in Lower Saxony, Germany

Hanover Hauptbahnhof–Buchholz (Nordheide) railway
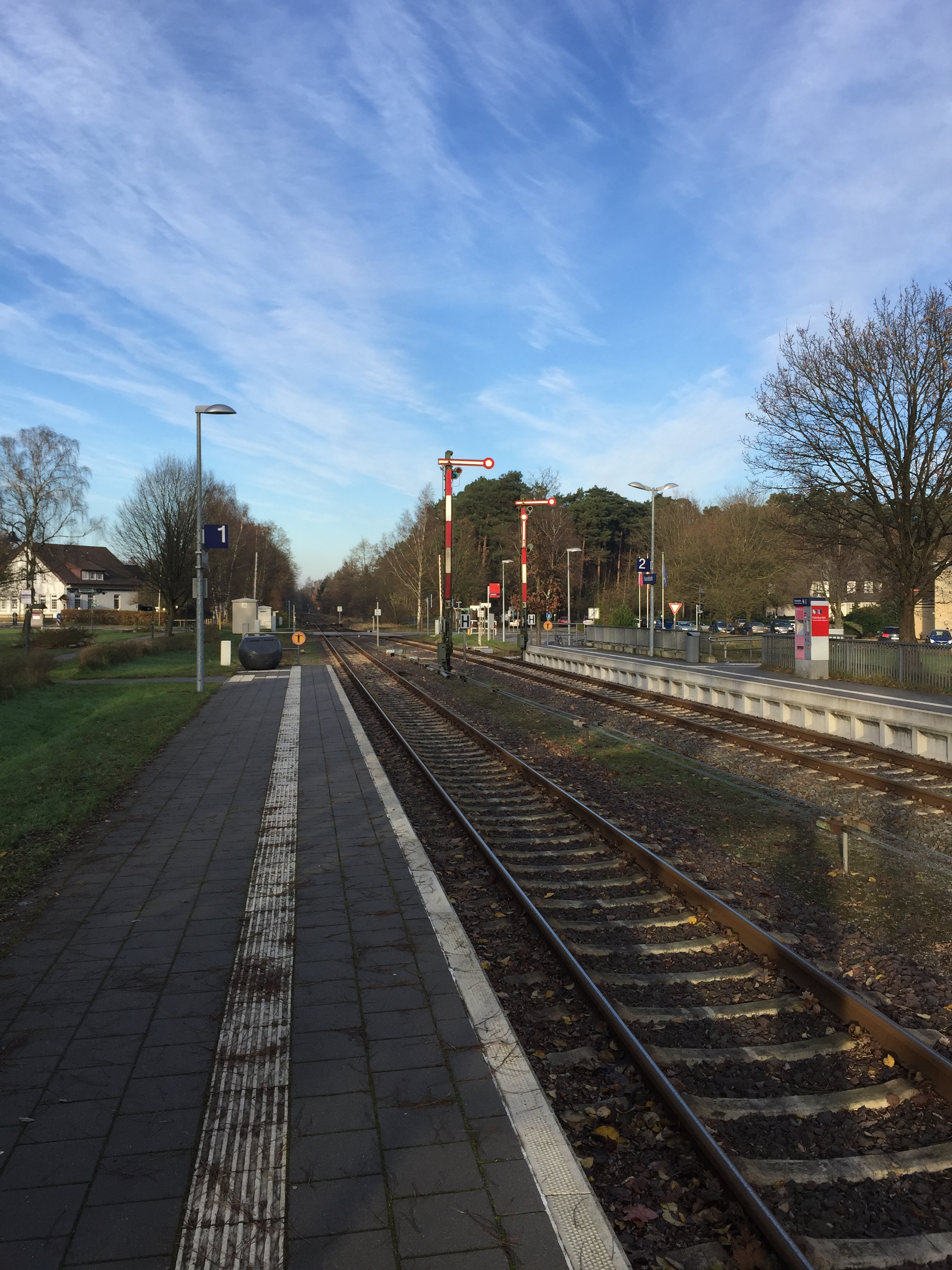

Overview
- Native name: Heidebahn
- Line number: 1711, 1712
- Locale: Lower Saxony, Germany

Service
- Route number: 123 Hannover–Buchholz; 363.4, 360.5 Hannover–Bennemühlen, earlier 363.4; formerly 109d (1941)

Technical
- Line length: 133.1 km (82.7 mi)
- Track gauge: 1,435 mm (4 ft 8 1/2 in) standard gauge
- Operating speed: 120 km/h (75 mph)
- Maximum incline: 1.05%
Route map
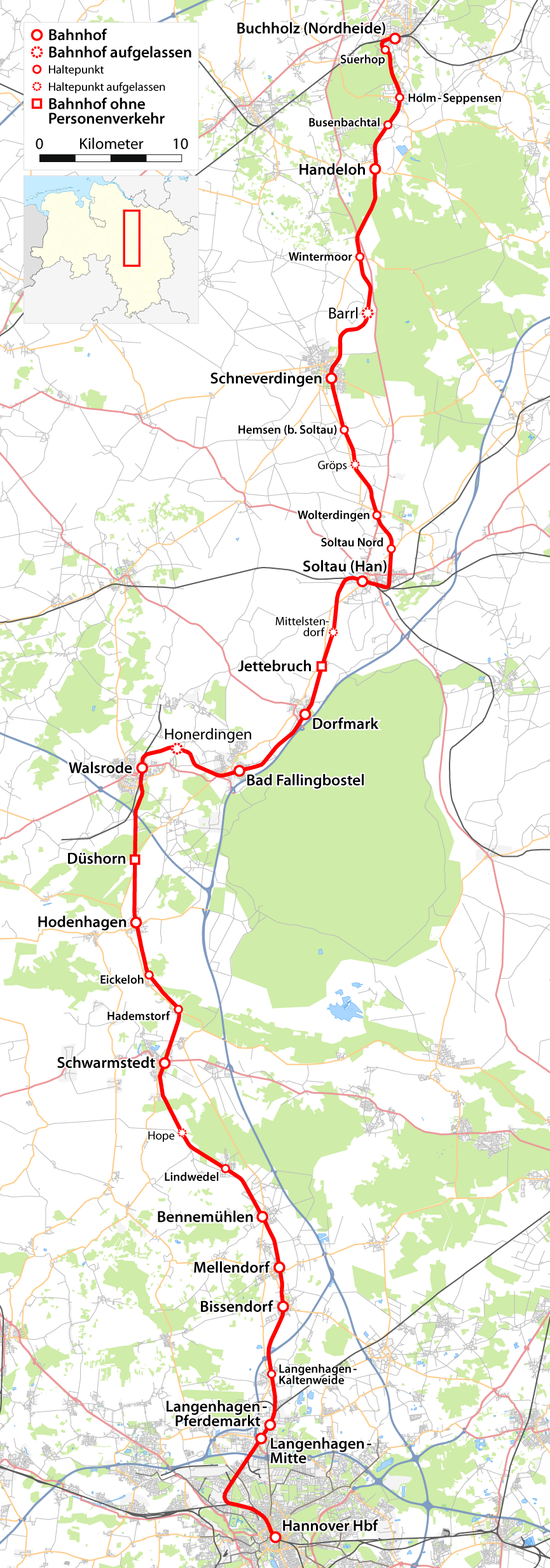
- Source: German railway atlas

The Heath Railway (German: Heidebahn) is a regional railway line in North Germany that crosses the Lüneburg Heath from which it derives its name. Most of the line is unelectrified and single-tracked. It links Buchholz in der Nordheide with Hanover, the capital city of Lower Saxony. Together with the east-west Uelzen–Langwedel railway, this north-south line is one of the two most important railways on the heath.

== History ==
Already in the middle of the 19th century, Walsrode sought a connection to a railway line in response to the growth of gunpowder factories in neighbouring Bomlitz. In 1866, during discussions of a proposal for the construction of the so-called America Line (Bremen–Uelzen–Berlin), the town of Walsrode unsuccessfully campaigned for a connection to this line. It was not until 27 February 1885 that the Prussian government approved the building of the Hannover–Walsrode–Visselhövede railway. This line was opened to Walsrode in 1890. Initially, freight operations were opened to Walsrode station on 16 June 1990 and the grand opening ceremony of the new Hanover–Visselhövede railway took place on 25 August 1890. Later, the section from Walsrode to Visselhövede was extended via Rotenburg an der Wümme, Zeven and Bremervörde to Bremerhaven. The Bremervörde–Walsrode section was intended as a long-distance connection and was built in largely straight sections. However, it could never establish itself as a through route.

Already at the beginning of the construction of the Hanover–Visselhövede line, Fallingbostel and Soltau also sought a connection to it. The Walsrode–Fallingbostel–Soltau branch line was opened on 1 October 1896. The first passenger train reached Fallingbostel on 1 June 1896.

The construction of the Soltau–Buchholz section began in 1898. The line was built using a mechanised method, with workers filling wagons hauled by narrow-gauge steam locomotives. The most expensive work of this section was a viaduct over the Dumpetal, which cost 27,000 marks. The opening run took place on 30 September 1901.

These sections have a distinctly secondary character.

=== Development ===
The current Heath Railway was now complete, but it was then supplemented by eight branch lines.

- The Celle–Schwarmstedt–Wahnebergen–Verden (Aller) state railway was built from 1903 to 1905. It formed part of the so-called Aller Valley Railway (Allertalbahn).
- The Verden–Walsrode Railway followed in 1911.
- The later Osthannoversche Eisenbahnen (OHE) network was connected from Soltau to Celle (23 April 1910), to Lüneburg (13 June 1913) and Neuenkirchen (1 January 1917).
- In Cordingen, the electrified Wolff & Co. works railway was connected to Bomlitz in 1915. At times it also carried public passenger traffic.
- The most important branch today, the so-called Hasenbahn (Hare Railway) from Langenhagen to Celle, was opened on 15 May 1938. The resulting Hannover–Langenhagen–Celle connection now forms part of the Hanover–Hamburg railway.
- The factory railway of the Eibia munitions company was connected in Honerdingen in 1938. Until 1945, it had the largest freight traffic in terms of quantity of the branches from the Heath Railway. It connected to the Wolff & Co. works railway to Bomlitz in Benefeld.

During the Second World War, the Heath Railway was an important transport route serving prison camps, the Bergen military training area and the local armament industry, such as the Eibia works. So the prisoner transports to Stalag XI B and Stalag XI D ran over the line. The prisoners were driven from Fallingbostel (now Bad Fallingbostel) station to the camps. Bad Fallingbostel station has a plaque commemorating these events.

The branch lines across the heath did not last long. Passenger traffic was abandoned on the OHE lines around Soltau from 1961 to 1975 and on the Verden–Walsrode Railway in 1964. In 1980, the line to Visselhövede was reduced to traffic to the works and passenger traffic to Bomlitz, which was served until 1991. The passenger traffic on the Aller Valley Railway (Verden–Schwarmstedt–Celle) was discontinued in 1966 and the line was closed in 1995.

The closure of the Heath Railway was repeatedly discussed in the 1980s and the early 1990s, with the Buchholz–Soltau section particularly at risk.

An S-Bahn was opened in Hanover in preparation for Expo 2000. The section of the Heath Railway to Bennemühlen was included in this network. The number of stops was increased from three to ten. Bennemühlen station was selected as a provisional end point, where passengers usually had to change trains to continue to Soltau until December 2012. Located on the border of the Hanover Region, this station has little of its own traffic. In the first years of operation, the new S-Bahn line was able to increase the number of passengers from 2,600 in 2000 to 7,200 in 2002.

Between Buchholz and Soltau there are still semaphore signals and this section of the line is still equipped with mechanical signal boxes. Since October 2011, Hodenhagen station has been extensively rebuilt and is now remotely controlled from Walsrode using a computer-based interlocking. In 2016, electronic interlockings were installed in Dorfmark and Fallingbostel, replacing the mechanical signal boxes.

== Development and modernisation ==
The Heath railway was upgraded until 2016 for a top speed of up to 120 km/h. The upgrade was carried out in three sections:

- section 1: Bennemühlen–Walsrode
- section 2: Walsrode–Soltau
- section 3: Soltau–Buchholz

The completion of the first construction phase between Bennemühlen and Walsrode was originally planned for 2007. It was only in December 2007 that the contracts necessary for the project were signed by the railway and the state of Lower Saxony (represented by the State public transport company of Lower Saxony—Landesnahverkehrsgesellschaft Niedersachsen, LNVG). As part of the project, the halts of Hademstorf and Eickeloh were closed in the summer of 2010. Under the winter timetable of 2011, the first regional trains ran on the first stage at 120 km/h, which reduces travel time by ten minutes. This reduction was made possible by the station closures, the upgrade of level crossings and the installation of a digital train radio system.

The third construction phase (Soltau–Buchholz) had to completed before the second construction phase (Walsrode–Soltau) to comply with the time restrictions on the use of EU funds. The design for the third construction phase was completed in 2008, so that the upgrade could be started by the end of 2009. By the end of 2011, the 46-kilometre section was upgraded to increase train speeds from 80 km/h to 120 km/h. The travel time was shortened by eleven minutes. After the completion of all construction works (2017), the stations of Wintermoor, Büsenbachtal and Suerhop were considered for closure. With passenger numbers (as of 2009) of 150 (Suerhop), 90 (Büsenbachtal) and 80 (Wintermoor), the minimum number of 200 passengers per day was not reached. The halt of Hemsen has not been served due to the construction work since 6 November 2010. In response to rising passenger numbers, the three halts were adapted to be barrier-free and extended in 2016, so now there can be served by sets of three LINT 41 railcars. The remaining work lasted until 2017.

The second construction phase started in early summer 2015. All construction measures were expected to be completed by 2017. The reduction of stops in Soltau to 15 minutes (2015: 24 minutes) at the timetable change in December 2016 resulted from the largely completed upgrade of the missing section. In addition, the travel time between Hanover and Buchholz was reduced while maintaining hourly intervals between services all day. With the transfer of the train crossings from Dorfmark to Soltau, a clock-face hub was established in Soltau for direct transfer to the trains on the Bremen–Uelzen railway, which also cross there at hourly-intervals.

Running time from Buchholz to Hanover:

- before start of construction (summer timetable for 2008) at least 2:24
- after completion (annual timetable for 2017) 1:50 (according to the timetable, typically 1:53 or 1:55)

The total cost of the upgrade was over €100 million.

Plans to upgrade the Heath Railway south of Walsrode as part of the Y-Trasse (Y-route) to the high-speed line have been abandoned. Instead, smaller upgrades are planned on other existing lines in the area.

== Current services ==
The Heath Railway is important for commuter traffic to Hanover and Hamburg as well as for day tourists. The RB 38 service runs hourly each day over the entire line between Hanover and Buchholz (Nordheide). By the time of the timetable change in 2016, however, only the line between Hanover and Soltau (Han) was served hourly on weekends.

The line is approved for a top speed of 120 km/h. On its southern section between Langenhagen and Bennemühlen the Heath Railway is electrified and forms line S 4 of the Hanover S-Bahn network. The track has been doubled as far as Bissendorf. The northern end between Buchholz in der Nordheide and Handeloh is part of the Hamburg Transport Association (HVV) network. On the line between Handeloh and Soltau the HVV fare tariff is restricted to season tickets.

Because the Hamburg–Uelzen–Hanover and Hamburg–Rotenburg (Wümme)–Verden (Aller)–Hanover routes are much faster, the Heath Railway is of little importance for through services; the journey from Hamburg to Hanover via Soltau takes at least 2 hours, 32 minutes according to the winter 2016/2017 timetable. No through connexions are offered; for example passengers have to change in Buchholz (Nordheide), Soltau and/or Bennemühlen.

There are regular goods trains only on the southern part of the line to Walsrode.

Osthannoversche Eisenbahnen AG (OHE) won the tender for the Heath Railway and took over operations at the timetable change in December 2011 for eight years. For this purpose, they founded a new subsidiary, Heidekreuzbahn GmbH, which was renamed Erixx GmbH on 18 April 2011.

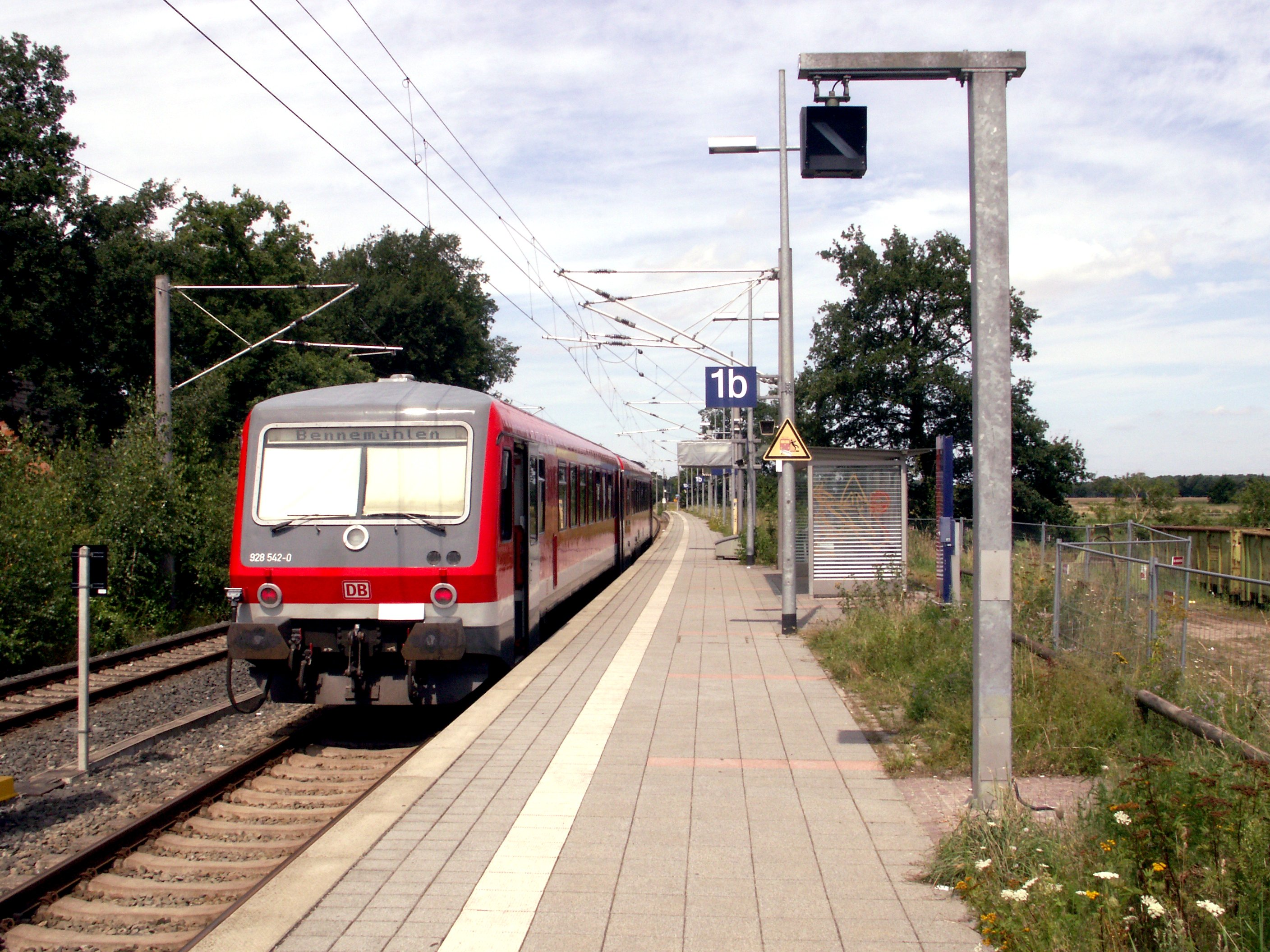
Bennemühlen station

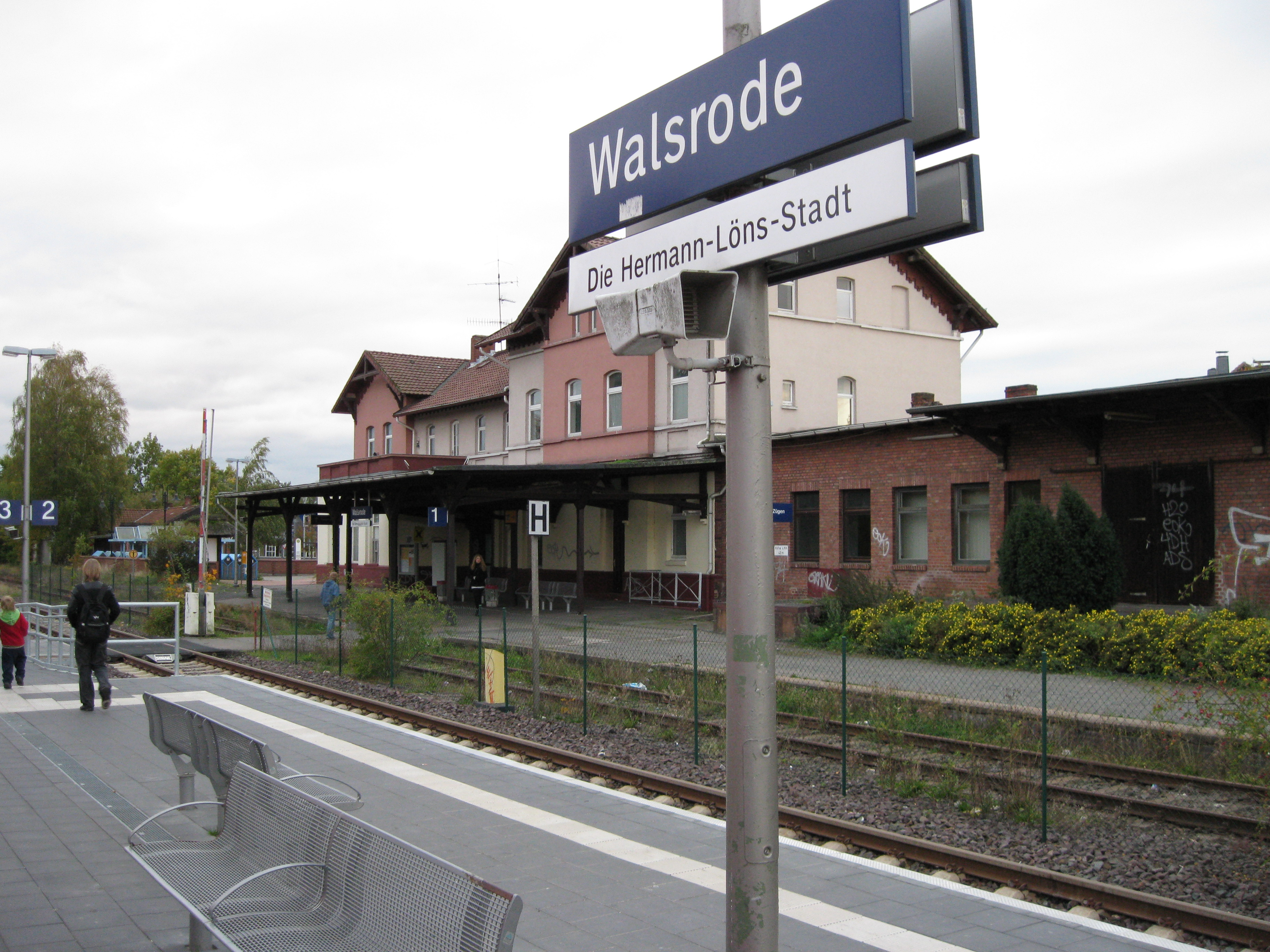
Walsrode station

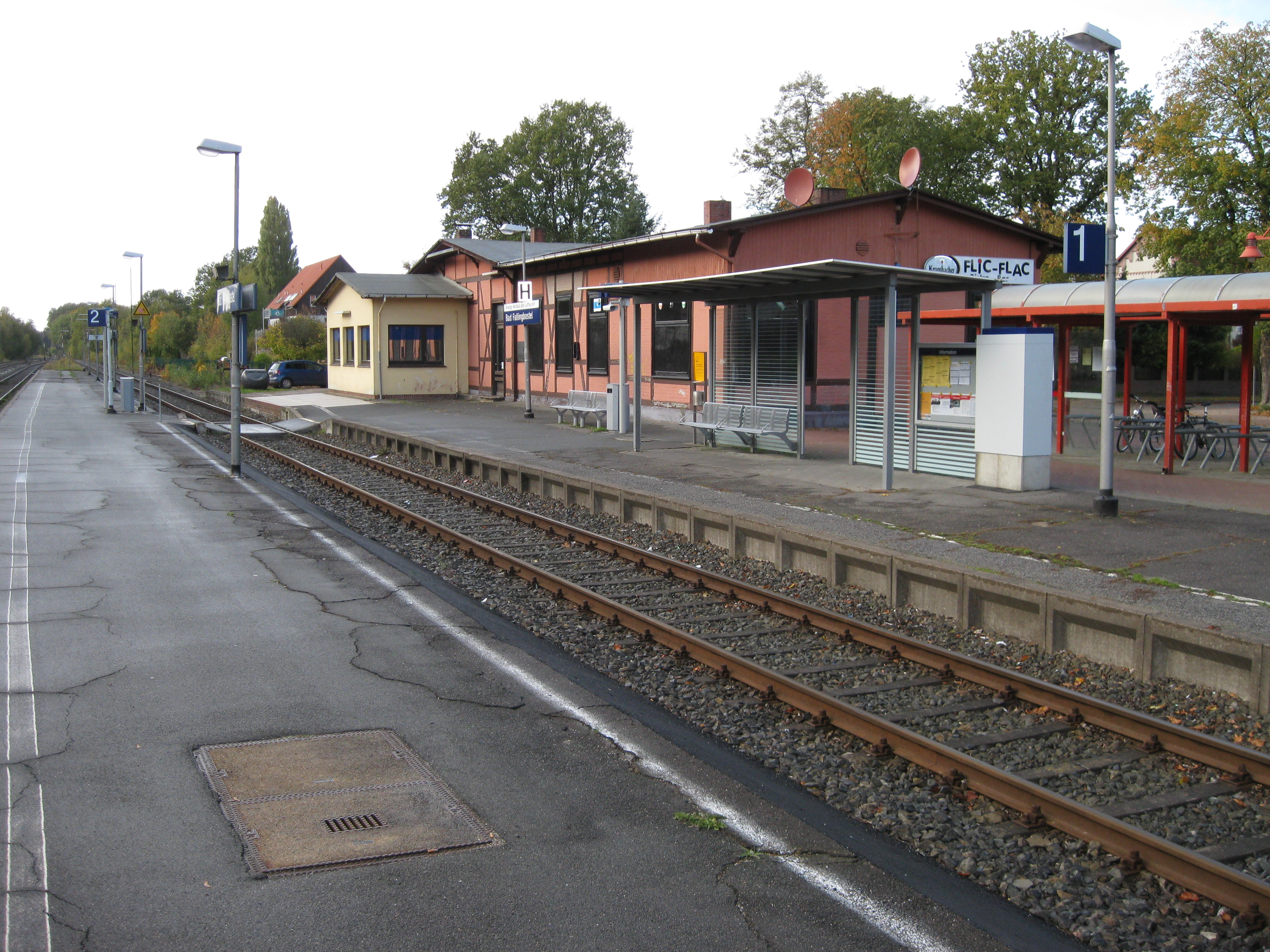
Bad Fallingbostel station

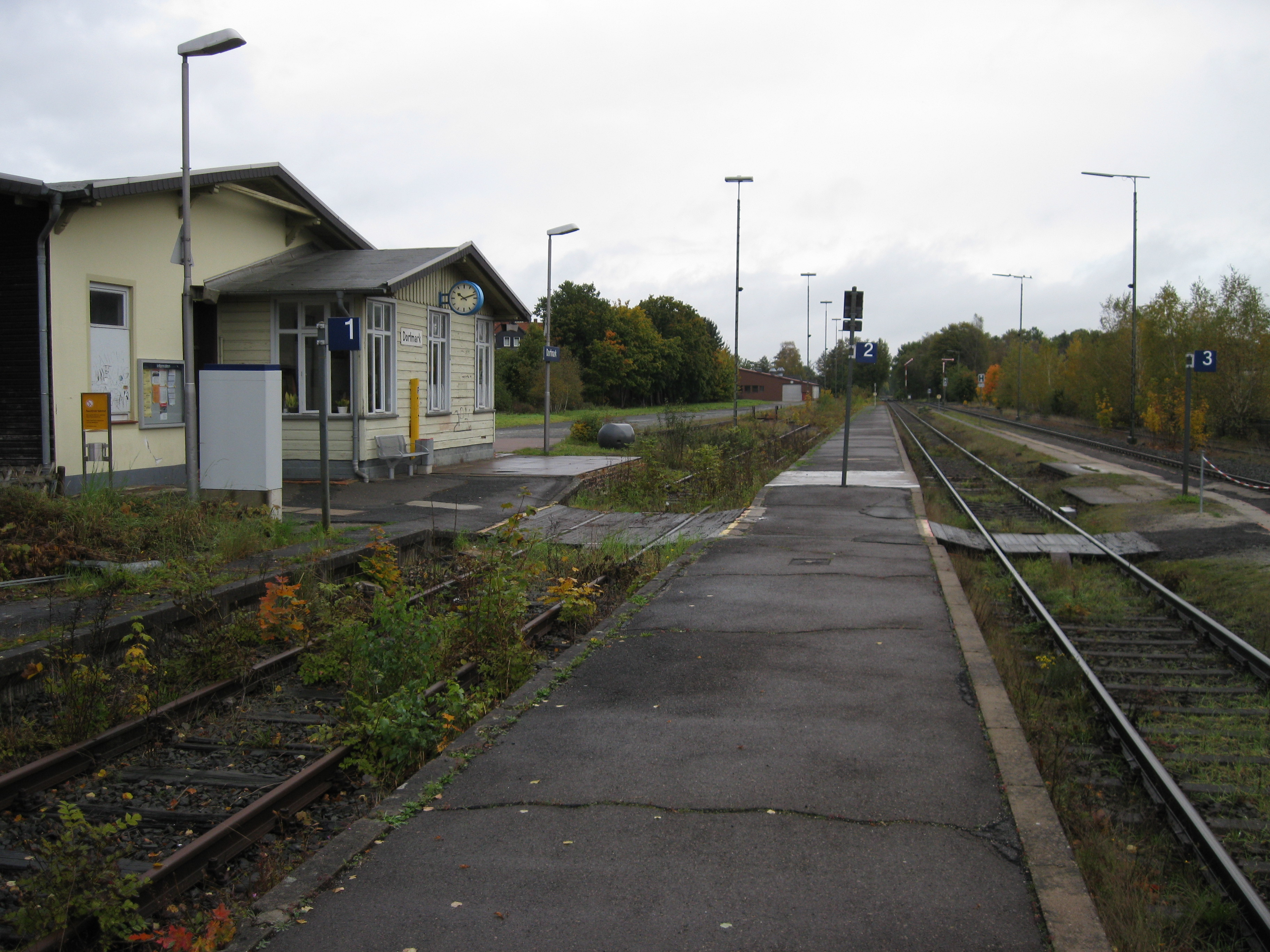
Dorfmark station

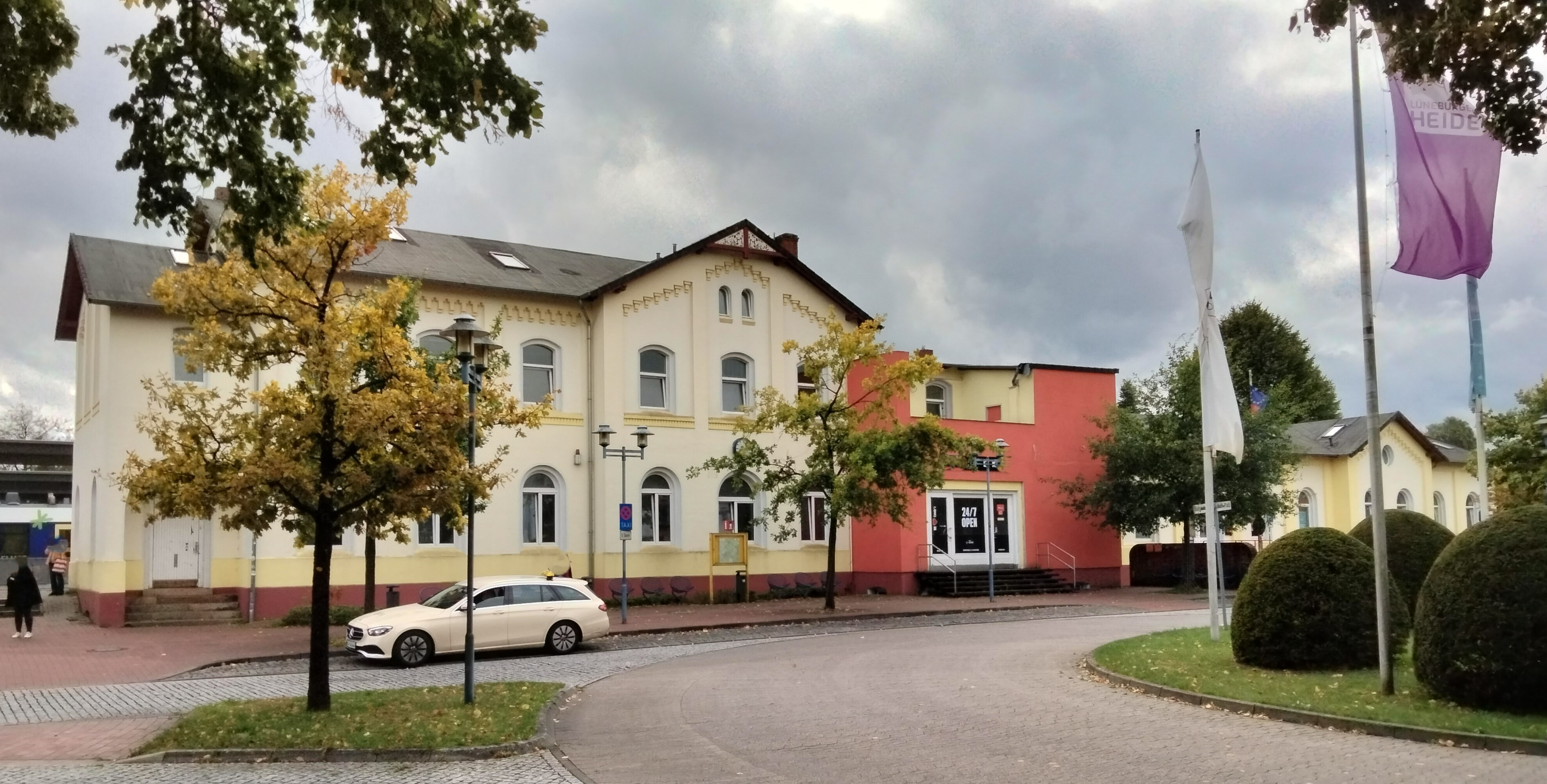
Soltau station

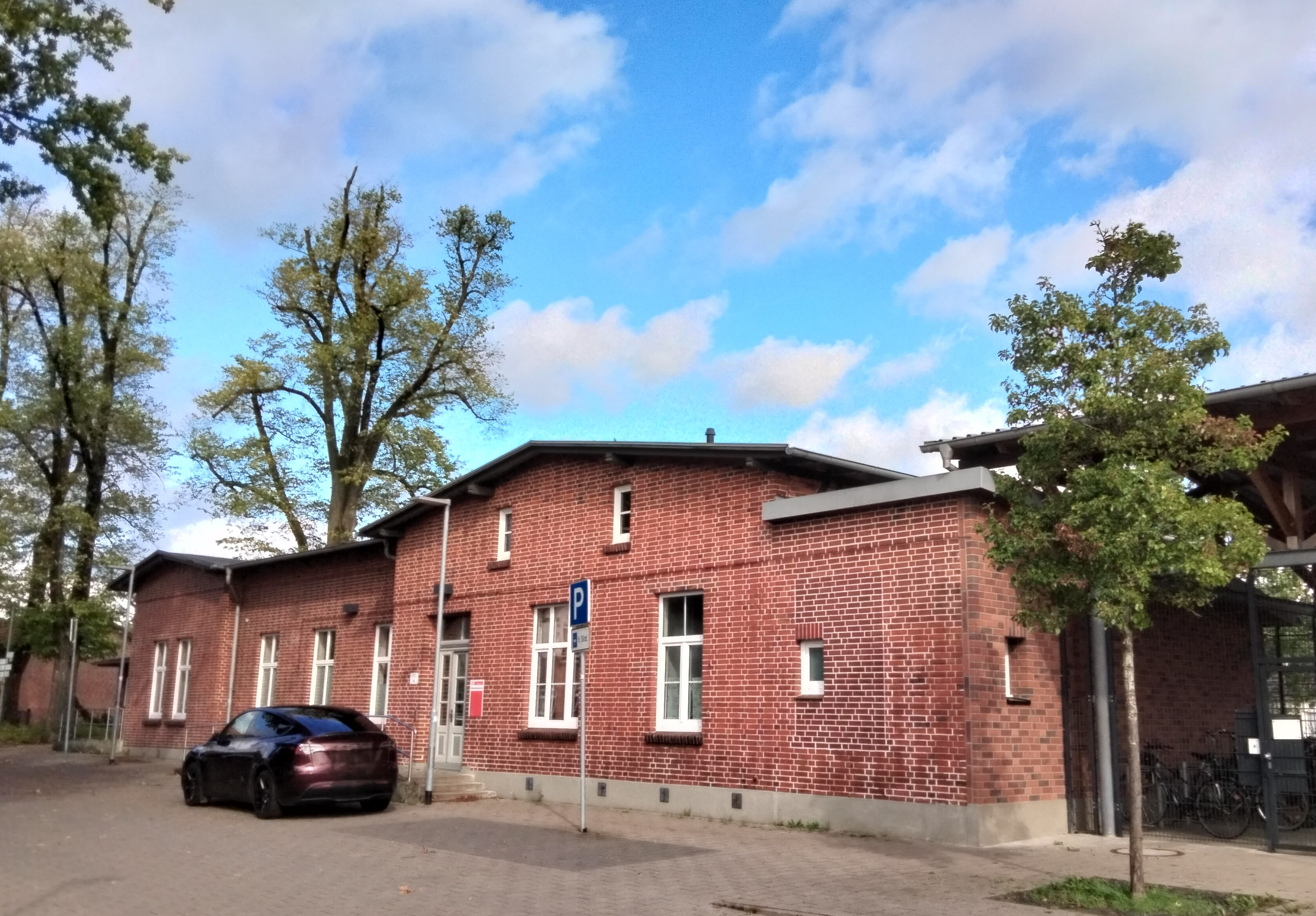
Schneverdingen station

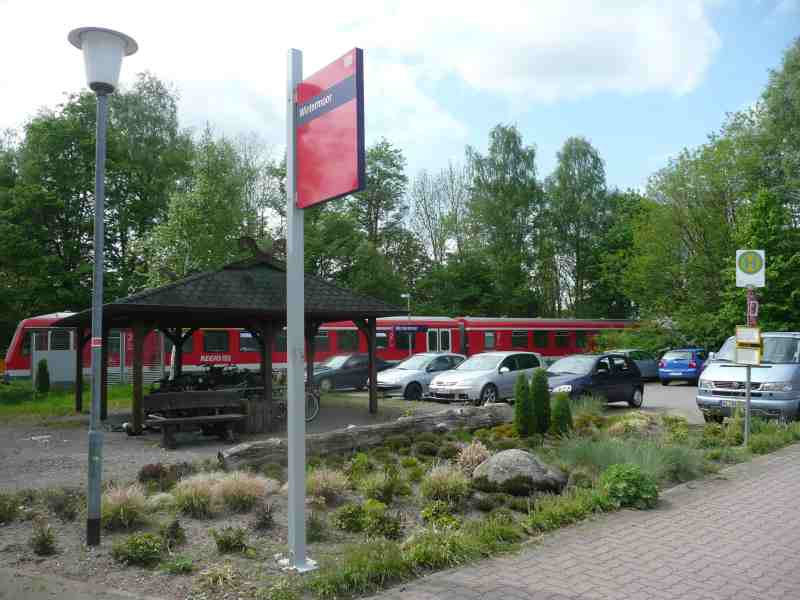
Wintermoor station

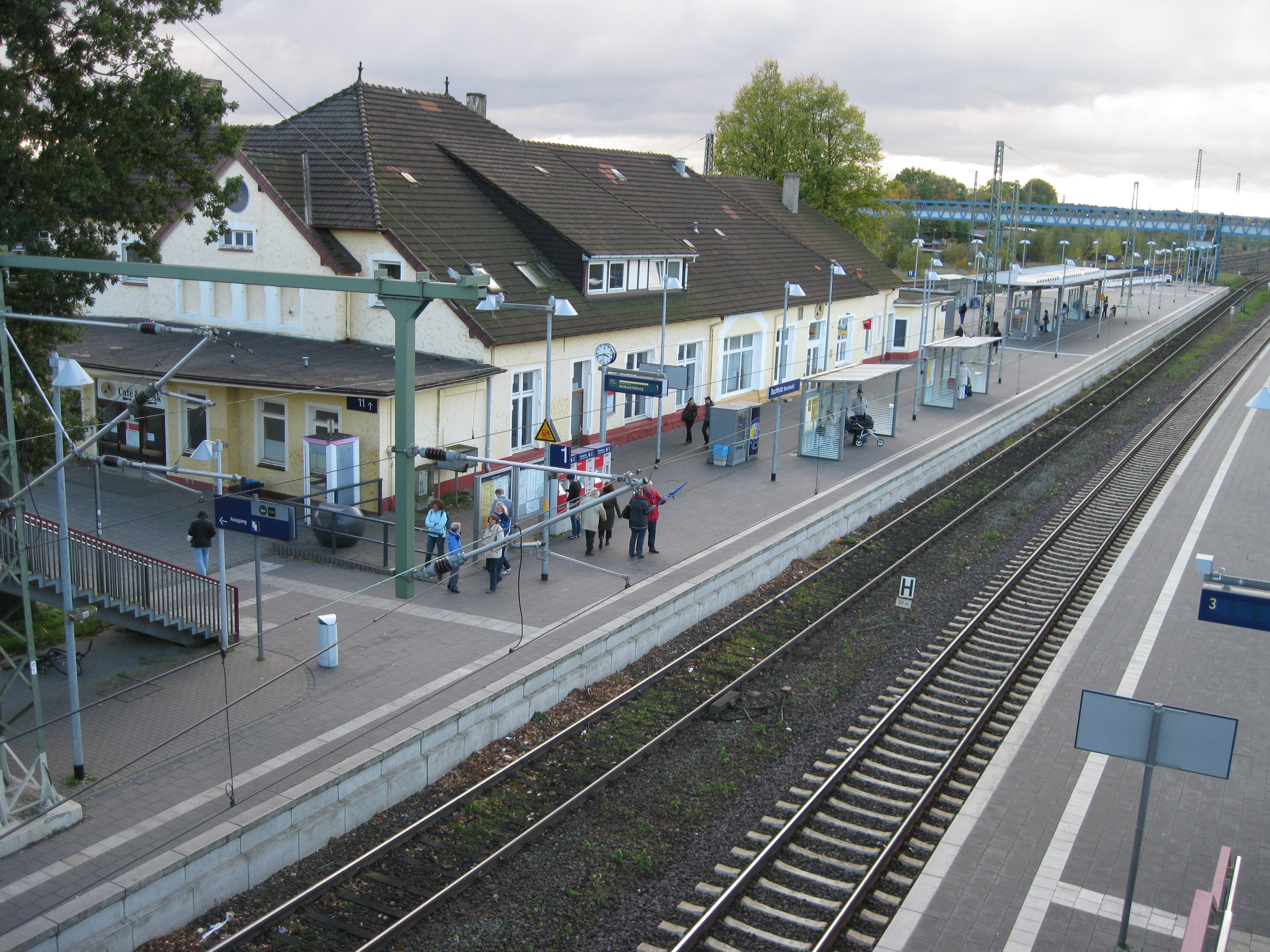
Buchholz station

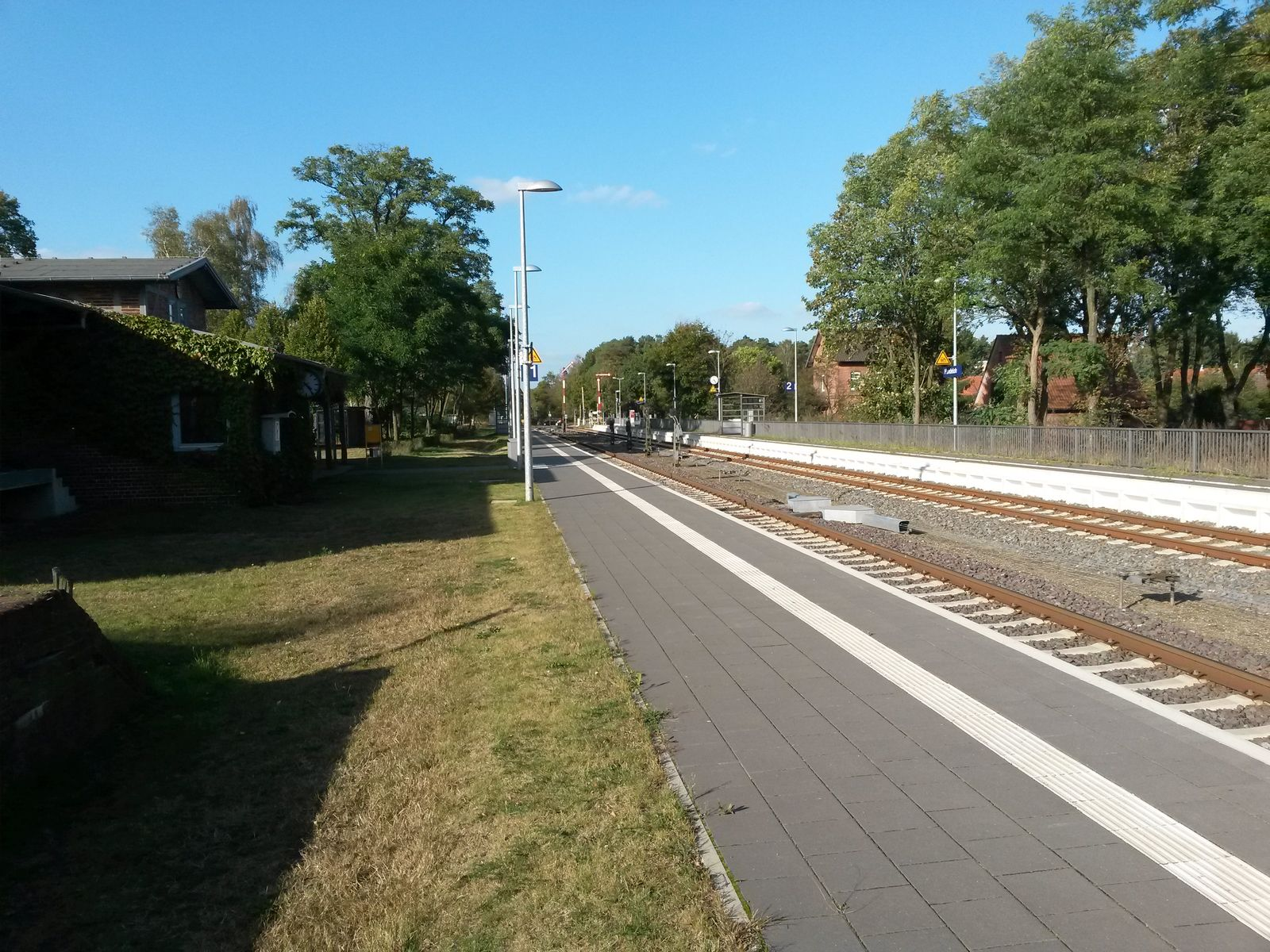
Handeloh station

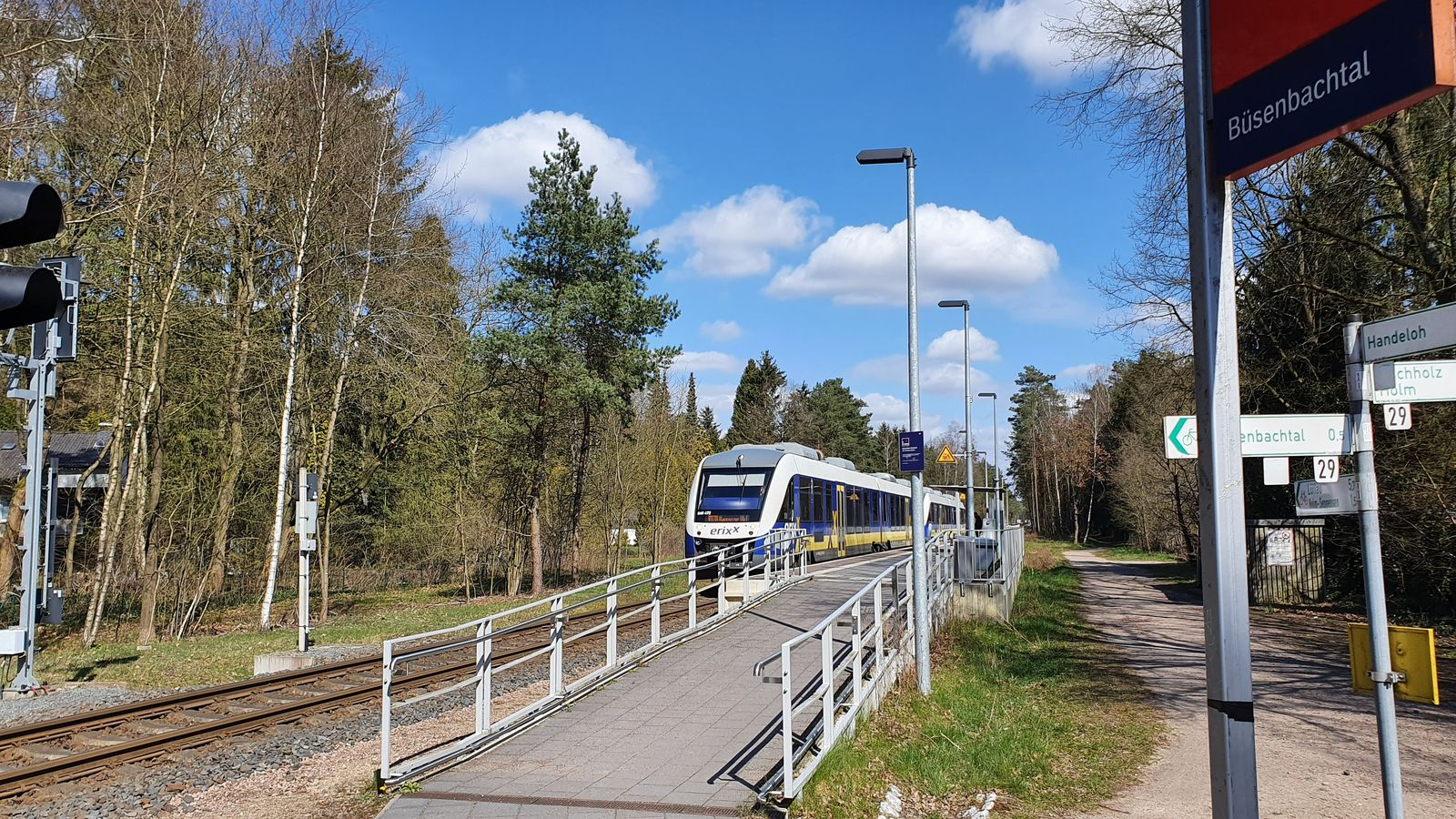
Büsenbachtal station

=== Rolling stock ===
The line is served by erixx GmbH with LINT 41 diesel multiple units depending on the day of the week and time in single, double or triple sets, although the section north of Soltau is served at most with double sets. The Hanover–Bennemühlen section is served by S-Bahn sets of class 424 and 425.2.

Freight traffic is operated by Deutsche Bahn with locomotives of classes 261 and 265 and by the Havelländische Eisenbahn.

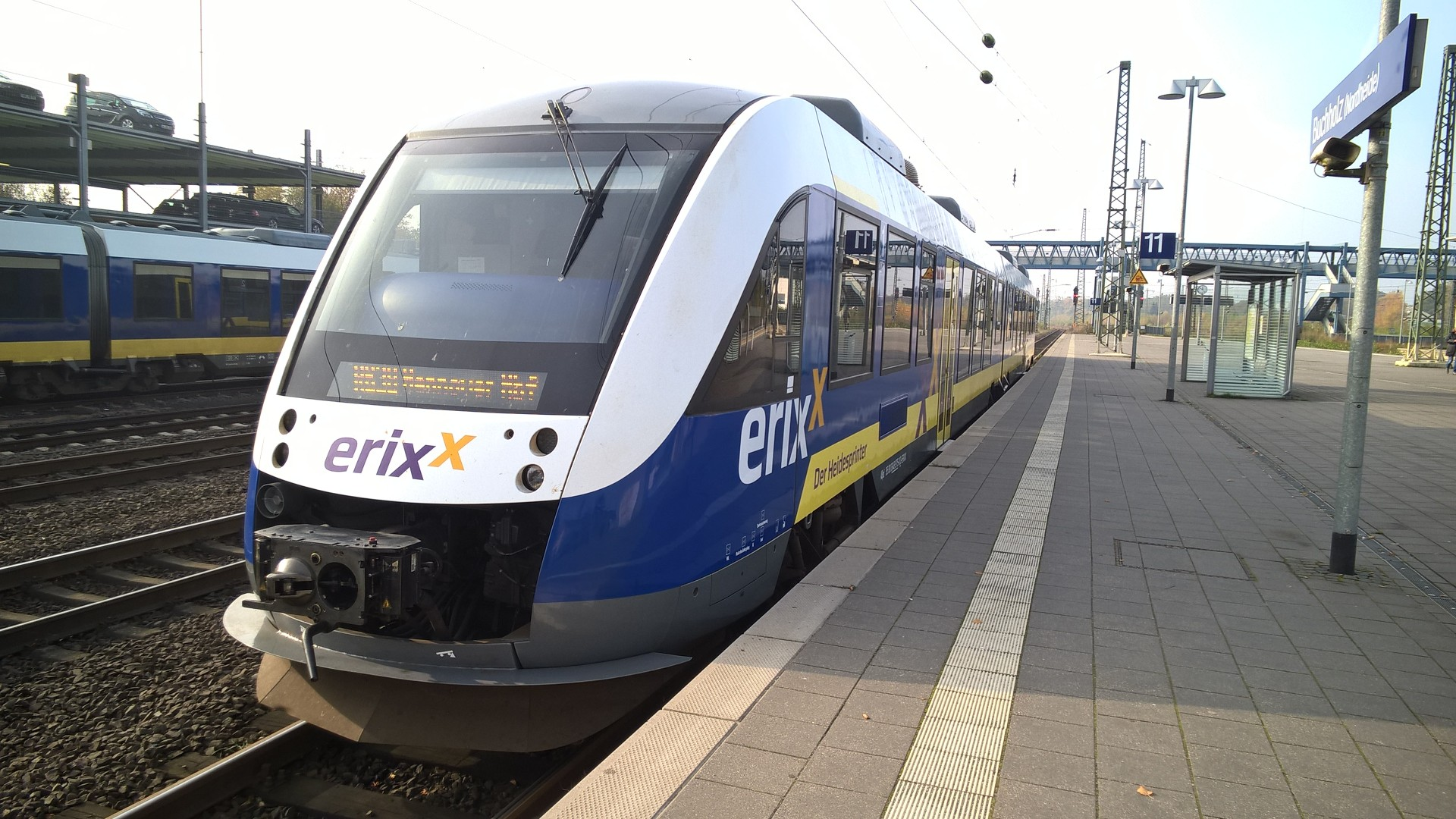
Erixx in Buchholz station

Until 10 December 2011, DB Regio operated class 628.4 diesel multiple units and, until 10 December 2005, it was served by five car trains that were hauled by class 218 locomotives and by class 634 diesel multiple units. The last class 798 railbus ran in 1989.
