= Großraum-Verkehr Hannover =

- Logo
- Abbreviation: GVH
- Named after: Greater Hanover area
- Formation: March 4, 1970; 56 years ago
- Headquarters: Karmarschstr. 30/32; 30159 Hannover
- Region served: Region Hannover

Großraum-Verkehr Hannover

Ridership between 1996 and 2013

Großraum-Verkehr Hannover (GVH; English: Greater Hanover Transport) is a transport association in Germany, operating in the Hannover region metropolitan area in the state of Lower Saxony. It is the second oldest transport association in Germany, only surpassed by the Hamburger Verkehrsverbund. The GVH tariff is valid on busses, the Hanover Stadtbahn, the Hanover S-Bahn and other rail services. The main operators of bus services in the GVH are üstra and RegioBus.

== History ==
GVH was founded on March 4, 1970. The year before, people took to the streets to protest against an announced fare increase. A separate ticket was needed for each mean of transport, fare systems vary between companies and the schedules of the different operators were not coordinated. This resulted in the "Red Dot Campaign", which then resulted the spark to form the Greater Hanover Transport Association.

This newly established association had six members: Verband Großraum Hannover, ÜSTRA, Bundesbahn, Bundespost, Steinhuder Meer-Bahn and the Verkehrsbetriebe Herrmann Bachstein. The first measure took in 1970 was the introduction of a unified fare system for all buses, trams and local trains. A unified schedule was agreed on in early 1972.

In September 26,1975, the A-Tunnel of the Hanover Stadtbahn was launched, which runs from the Hauptbahnhof to Kröpcke and Markthalle, through to Waterlooplatz. This was then followed by the B- and C-Tunnels. Plans for a D-Tunnel was not followed through and currently runs on street level instead.

The new Call-taxi and Call-bus service were launched on August 4, 1978, serving flexibly on demand of passengers. This service aims to serve areas, where a complete bus services would be excessive compared to the ridership.

In September 1978, the first "Greater Area Discovery Day" took place, which is still currently happening annually. On the second Sunday of September, a day ticket for one zone (A, B or C) is valid for the whole GVH network. A big festival downtown shows the diversity of the whole region.

Before the Expo 2000, the local transport network was expanded, with about 1,1 billion euros being invested for the improvements. A Stadtbahn connection through Bemerode and the Kronsberg up to the fairgrounds was established. The Hanover Zoo was also connected with the rail network. The Stadtbahn fleet itself was expanded, with 144 new TW 2000 vehicles. LNG buses designed by James Irvine were also operated.
