= Visselhövede station =

Railway station in Visselhövede, Germany

Visselhövede
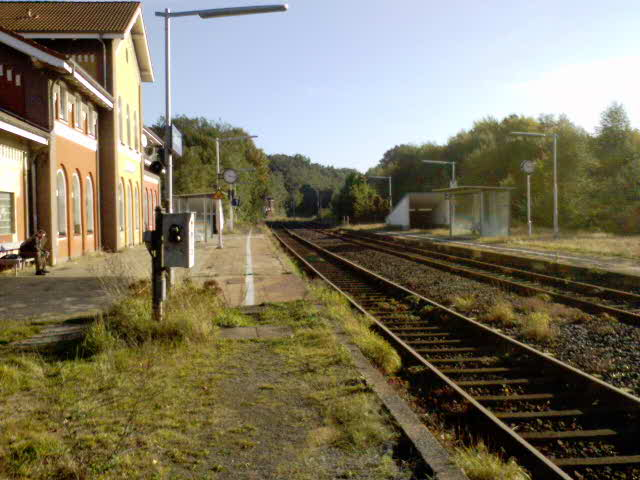
- Visselhövede station looking east

General information
- Location: Visselhövede, Lower Saxony; Germany
- Coordinates: 52°58′47″N 9°33′59″E
- Lines: Uelzen–Langwedel railway (KBS 116); Bremervörde–Visselhövede–Walsrode (dismantled)
- Platforms: 2

Other information
- Station code: n/a
- Category: 6
- Fare zone: VBN: 390; HVV: G/1118 (VBN transitional tariff, season tickets only)

Services
Preceding station	Start	Following station
Langwedel towards Bremen Hbf	RB 37	Soltau (Han) towards Uelzen
Location
- Location within Lower Saxony

Visselhövede station is on the Uelzen–Langwedel railway in the German state of Lower Saxony. It is served by RegionalBahn passenger trains operated by DB Regio and goods trains run by the East Hanoverian Railways (OHE).

== Location ==
Visselhövede is classified by the Deutsche Bahn as a category 6 station and is located about 1.5 kilometres southwest of the town centre on the L 171 state road in the direction of Kirchlinteln–Verden an der Aller. It was built as a through station and is oriented east-west.

== Connexions to other means of public transport ==
The station bus stop, Visselhövede Bahnhof, is on Hauptstraße and is served by the Weser-Ems Bus Company route to Rotenburg an der Wümme and by local town bus services.

== Facilities ==
=== Station building and surrounds ===
The station has a comparatively large station building on the northern side of the tracks that now belongs to the German Red Cross (Deutsches Rotes Kreuz) and is no longer open to the public. Immediately east of the station building is a small flight of steps which is the entrance to the home platform where there is a ticket machine. The platform can also be reached from around the western side of the building, but the path is in very poor condition due to numerous, deep potholes which preclude wheelchair access. In front of the station building a small car park has been retained in the shape of a pothole-covered area of tarmac with no markings and a covered bicycle stand. The station has not yet been adapted for disabled use and the whole station yard is in need of refurbishment (as at 2008).

=== Platforms ===
A second platform is reached via a barrier-protected underpass that dates from a time when there was a much higher level of traffic. Beyond that there used to be a third platform accessed by a footbridge from platform 2. Today only the home platform (platform 1) is used, except when for a single, morning train crossing when the island platform (platform 2) is used.

=== Other facilities ===
Following a comprehensive dismantling of the old goods and marshalling sidings, only a private loading siding and a storage siding remain. To the east there is a level crossing whose barriers are still locally controlled. Around 2 km further east an industrial siding branches north from the Soltau direction into an industrial estate. This can no longer be directly worked from Visselhövede station.

== History ==
=== 1873 to 1945 ===
Visselhövede station was originally opened in 1873 as an express station during the construction of the America Line by the Magdeburg-Halberstadt Railway Company. Evidence of this can still be seen from the long platform edges. Today only a fraction of the original platform length is actually used. Expresses stopped calling at Visselhövede in 1900.

In 1890 a line branching off to the southeast to Walsrode was opened. This was followed in 1906 by another link, this time via Brockel to Rotenburg, which branched off in a southwesterly direction before swinging north and crossing under the America Line. Visselhövede thus became a regional railway hub whose station was upgraded with an underpass and a turntable.

=== 1945 to 1987 ===
AFter the Second World War the America Line lost its importance as a result of the division of Germany. Since then the majority of customers have been commuters, soldiers from the local garrison and occasional passengers. In 1958 the link to Rotenburg was closed and in 1980 the Walsrode line also folded. Both have now been dismantled (see also: Bremervörde–Walsrode railway). By 1987 the western section of the America Line had been downgraded from a partly double-tracked main line to an entirely single-tracked branch line.

=== 1987 to 2008 ===
During this period much of the previously extensive station facilities at Visselhövede was dismantled. Because several smaller halts in the neighbourhood have been closed this is now the only station in a large, rural, sparsely populated region that stretches from the western area of the Lüneburg Heath to the Linteln Geest and includes the southern part of Rotenburg district and the extreme eastern end of Verden district (part of the Kirchlinteln municipality). Goods trains today include a high level of wood traffic and those serving a mineral oil firm in an industrial estate east Visselhövede. Occasional goods trains belonging to small, private companies pass through between e.g. Wilhelmshaven and destinations in Central Germany and Berlin.

=== 2009 technical overhaul ===
In early 2009 an overhaul of the technical infrastructure was completed. In addition to rectifying shortcomings on the running line which had become increasingly urgent since the 1990s, the station was given an automatic train detection system (automatische Gleisfreimeldeanlage) and new colour light signals. One of the two signal boxes became redundant as a result. The train director (Fahrdienstleiter) (signal box "Vf") is now based in the former pointsmen's signal box "Vo". The hand-operated level crossing and the semaphore signals at the eastern exit to the station had to remain, because the Federal Railway Office (EBA) would only authorise a full upgrade of the station with the latest technology (the electronic signal box, ESTW). But there is no way to do this. The Class Dr S2 signalling technology that replaces pointsmen dates from the 1950s. The upgrade is an EBA-mandated emergency measure to resolve urgent safety issues that is needed to keep the line open. In previous years the EBA had repeatedly threatened the DB AG with a complete ban on operations on the Langwedel–Soltau route due to its clapped out infrastructure.

== Future ==
The Visselhövede town council plans to expand the station to handle the transportation of wood. In addition there have been several discussions about moving the location of the present passenger station on the America Line to the east, nearer to the town centre.
