= Soltau (Han) station =

Railway station in Soltau, Germany

Soltau (Han)
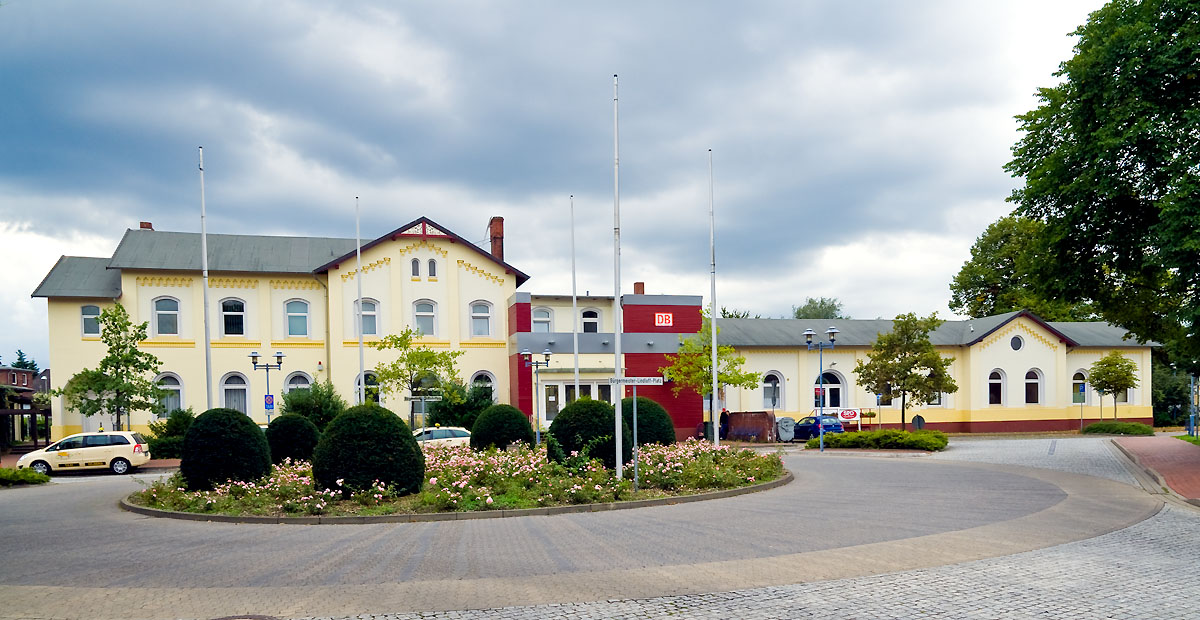
- Station building, street side

General information
- Location: Am Bahnhof 1, Soltau, Lower Saxony; Germany
- Coordinates: 52°58′59″N 9°49′55″E
- Lines: Uelzen–Langwedel (km 52,1); Hanover–Buchholz (km 88.0)
- Platforms: 4

Construction
- Accessible: Yes

Other information
- Station code: 5892
- DS100 code: HSO
- IBNR: 8000088
- Category: 5
- Fare zone: HVV: F/1028
- Website: www.bahnhof.de

History
- Opened: 1873

Services
Preceding station	Start	Following station
Visselhövede towards Bremen Hbf	RB 37	Munster (Örtze) towards Uelzen
Soltau Nord towards Buchholz (Nordheide)	RB 38	Dorfmark towards Hannover Hbf
Location
- Location within Lower Saxony

Soltau (Han) station is in the town of Soltau in the German state of Lower Saxony, located in the centre of the Lüneburg Heath. As a junction station on two railway lines, Hannover Hbf – Buchholz (Heath Railway) and Bremen Hbf – Uelzen (Uelzen–Langwedel railway), it is a central transport hub of the region and serves commuters and visitors to the Lüneburg Heath as a destination and transfer station.

The station was opened in 1873 and by the mid-20th century it was served by local and long-distance services running in seven different directions. The America Line (Amerikalinie), which ran from Berlin to Bremerhaven via Soltau, had considerable significance for passenger and goods traffic from the ports of the North Sea at the end of the 19th and the beginning of the 20th century. At that time, Schnellzug (semi-fast) services also ran. In addition, there were connections to several light railways to Lüneburg, Celle and Neuenkirchen. After the Second World War, the America Line increasingly lost its national significance. Passenger traffic on the light railways has been discontinued.

== History ==
Despite Soltau’s geographically favourable location in the triangle between the cities of Hamburg, Hanover and Bremen at the beginning of railway development in the Kingdom of Hanover, it was not connected to the railway network in the 1840s. Because of the greater importance of Lüneburg, the Hanover–Hamburg line, which was opened in 1847, was built on a detour via Lüneburg and Celle rather than on the direct route through Soltau.

After the annexation of the Kingdom of Hanover by Prussia in 1866, the Prussian capital, it was decided to connect Berlin to the ports on the North Sea by the shortest route. This Bremen–Berlin link for industrial traffic would run through Soltau. A "second class" station was planned in the town. Because of the better connection to the trunk road (now federal highway 3), the state commission preferred a location east of today's Celler Straße. At the request of the town of Soltau, however, the station was then built in only three years near Walsroder Straße. The cost of the construction was met by the city of Bremen. On 1 August 1873, the station and line were sold to the Prussian state. The Uelzen–Langwedel railway was opened for goods traffic on 15 April 1873 as part of the line from Berlin to Bremen and on 15 May 1873 for passengers. Until 1886, the Magdeburg–Halberstadt Railway Company (Magdeburg-Halberstädter Eisenbahngesellschaft) operated the railway on behalf of the Bremen State Railway. After that it was nationalised and administered by the Eisenbahndirektion (railway division of) Hannover of the Prussian state railways. The element (Han) was added to the station’s name to make clear it was located in the Province of Hanover and it still retains it.

The development of the Lüneburg Heath did not have a high priority and so the plans for additional lines were repeatedly postponed. In 1881, a direct connection from Hanover to Walsrode and Soltau was discussed for the first time. However, a request by Hanover in relation to the administrative district of Fallingbostel was rejected for financial reasons. The plans changed several times in the next few years and finally, in 1890, the Hanover–Walsrode railway was extended, not to Soltau, but first towards Visselhövede. Because the citizens in Fallingbostel, in particular, demanded a connection from Walsrode and Soltau, a line was finally approved and it was opened on 30 September 1896. From the beginning, four train pairs ran on the Walsrode–Soltau line, three of them ran through to and from Hanover. The journey from Soltau to Hanover took more than three hours.

In addition, a connection from Soltau to Buchholz, that is towards Hamburg, was opened on 1 October 1901, completing the line now called the Heath Railway. The trip from Hamburg to Soltau took almost four hours—partly due to a long stop in Buchholz and sometimes a requirement to change there. Thus Soltau had become a railway junction, from which trips were possible in all four directions.

At the neighbouring Soltau Süd light railway station, it was possible to transfer to the Celle–Soltau (from 1910), Lüneburg–Soltau (from 1913) and Soltau–Neuenkirchen (from 1920) light railway lines.

In the 1920s, semi-fast trains that stopped only at the main stations also ran on the Heath Railway and, for example, reduced the travel time from Hanover to Soltau to less than two hours. The permissible running speed was raised to 60 km/h on 2 October 1932. In the 1930s, especially on Sundays and public holidays, thousands of day trippers from the cities of Hanover, Altona and Harburg took the train to the heath. The importance of the Soltau station was also evident in its outward appearance, such as the entrance building with its numerous outbuildings and signal boxes as well as the length of the main platforms.

The most significant route was the Uelzen–Langwedel main line, which was also called the America Line because of the emigrants to America who used it. There were also some express services on this line that served Soltau station. For example, in 1939 the timetable showed three D-Züge (long-distance expresses): Berlin–Norddeich Mole (D 102), Berlin–Wilhelmshaven (D 106) and Berlin–Bremen (D 108).

=== Soltau station under the Nazis ===
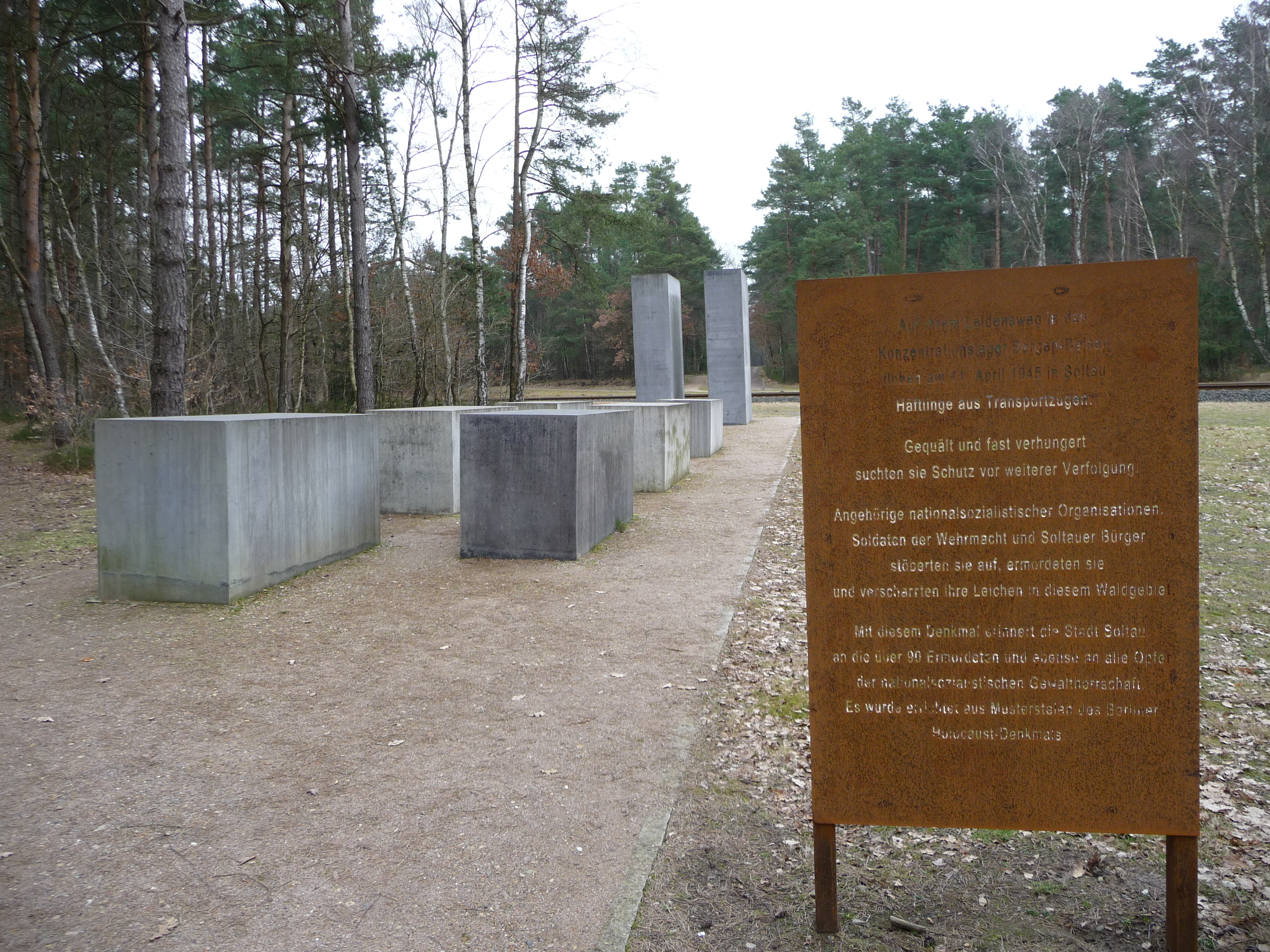
Holocaust memorial in Soltau

Soltau (Han) station played a tragic role in the transport of prisoners of the Nazis as a supply and junction station, connecting to the concentration camps of Neuengamme and Bergen-Belsen as well as to the east to Sobibór and Auschwitz. The National Socialist People's Welfare ran a soup kitchen at the station and there was a military hospital barracks there.

From about 1942, normal passenger trains, declared as special trains with many "passengers" from the Netherlands, stopped in Soltau and the misery of the prisoners became more and more obvious, especially shortly before the end of the war. In 1945, thousands of concentration camp prisoners, crammed into cattle wagons, were transported through the stations along the Heath Railway. Over 600 people died on the line between Buchholz and Soltau.

There were air raids on Soltau station from 22 February 1945. The tracks were disrupted on 11 April 1945, so that no train operations were possible. The long concentration camp trains remained on the open line. Some inmates escaped in the Oeninger Wald and made their way towards Soltau. Some people in Soltau supported the refugees with food and clothing, but members of the Wehrmacht, the SS and the local Hitler Youth, together with some citizens of Soltau, hunted down the escapees. They drove them together and killed a total of more than a hundred people mostly on the spot.

=== Developments after the Second World War ===
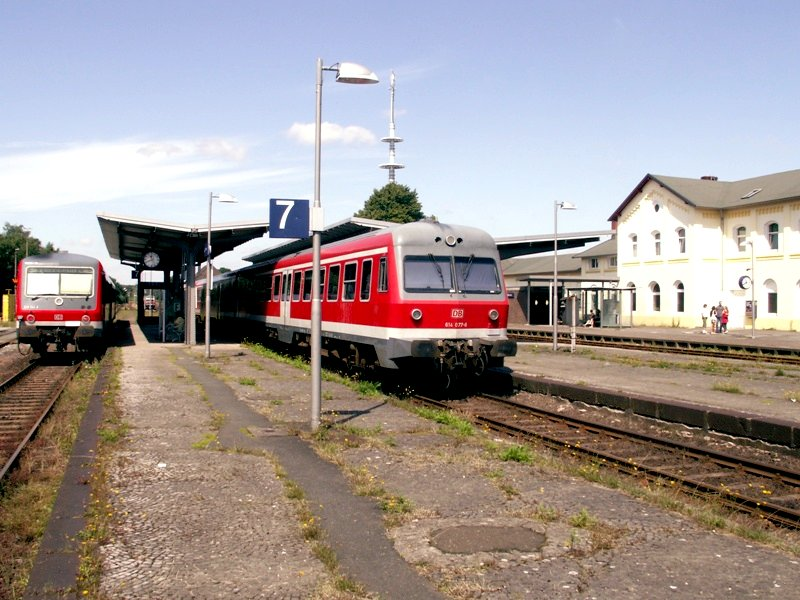
Platforms with DB trains before their renovation

The Berlin – Soltau (– Bremen) route was cut after the Second World War by the occupation zone border and lost its national significance. Even after the reunification and the closing of the gap to Salzwedel, the America Line remained a one-track branch line.

Semi-fast train ran from Hamburg-Altona to Altenbeken via Hanover over the Heath Railway through Soltau from the 1950s until the 1970s. After that they terminated in Hanover. From the 1980s, only local trains ran towards Hamburg, usually terminating in Buchholz, requiring a change of trains. Semi-fast trains often ran towards Hanover until the 1990s; these were later replaced by regional trains.

From 1961 onwards, the passenger trains from Lüneburg and Celle Soltau, which had previously terminated in Soltau Süd light railway station, ran directly to Soltau (Han) station to facilitate the transfer. Soltau Süd station was closed to passenger traffic. The operation of trains from Neuenkirchen to the Deutsche Bundesbahn station (and vice versa) would have required a reversal (with locomotive running around); instead, passenger services on this line were closed on 28 May 1961. Passenger traffic was also abandoned between Bergen and Celle on 30 May 1975 and on the Lüneburg–Soltau line from 21 May 1977. Since then, the two line that connect to the freight yard at Soltau Süd station are almost exclusively used by freight trains.

In 1969, the permissible speed on the Hanover–Buchholz line was raised to 80 km/h. Closure of the branch line was considered from time to time from 1978, which led to protests. The Rettet die Heidebahn (save the Heath Railway) association was founded in 1984 and operated more than 70 special trips with a total of 35,000 passengers in the following years. In 1989, after an upgrade of the line, a ceremony was also held in Soltau for the inauguration of the so-called Neuen Heidebahn (new Heath Railway). Numerous special trains ran in the 1990s on the Heath Railway and through Soltau, so there were in 1994, for example, trips to Bad Segeberg, Westerland, Cologne and the island of Rügen.

=== Current planning and modernisation ===
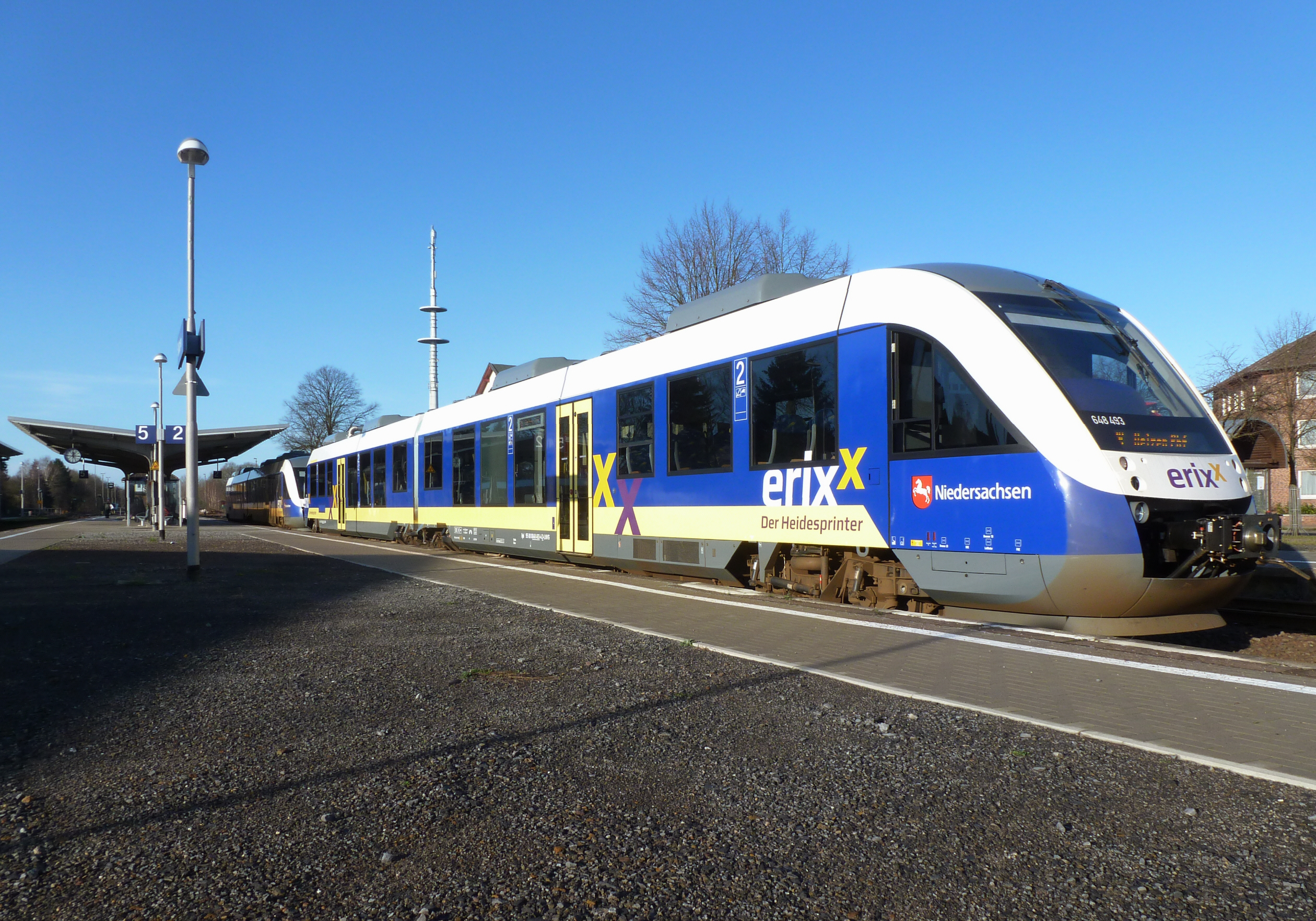
Restored platform with Erixx train (2012)

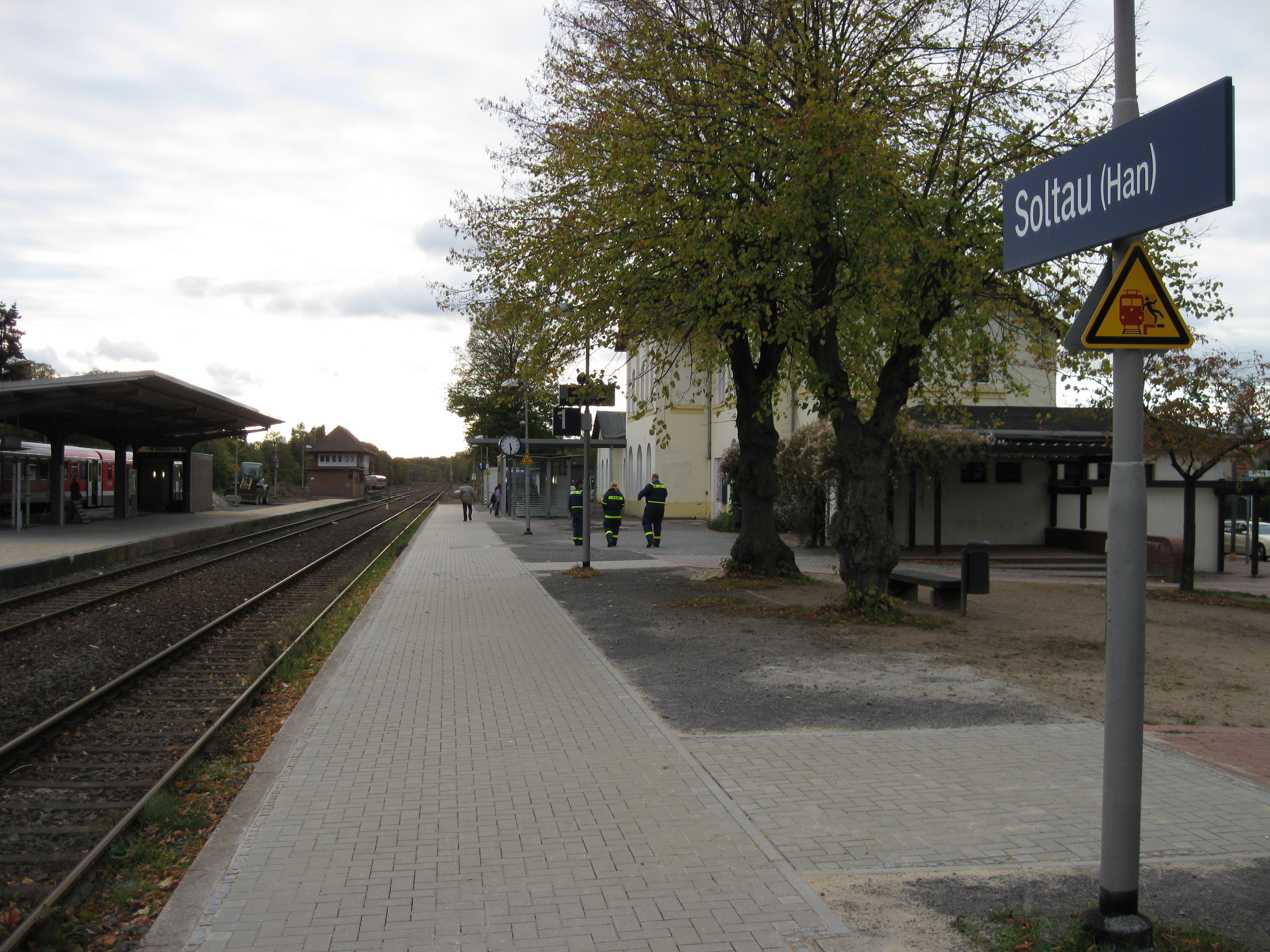
View over the main platform

From 2005 the establishment of a memorial for the murdered prisoners transported to concentration camps by train in 1945 was discussed, which was originally intended to be located at the station. The discussion about the memorial and its location, in particular an online vote in the Böhme-Zeitung, in which, after a call in a far-right forum, most participants spoke out against the memorial, caused a stir nationwide. It was finally built in 2007 near the site of the killings in the Forst Sibirien (forest) of stelae modelled directly on those of the Berlin Holocaust Memorial. The choice of location on the outskirts instead of at the centrally located station also caused criticism. At the beginning of November 2009, the Train of Remembrance (Zug der Erinnerung), which commemorated the children deported to the extermination camps, stopped at Soltau station.

In the autumn of 2010, the platforms were completely renovated and dynamic displays were installed. Already in February of the same year, a new, modern ticket machine was installed.

In December 2011, the erixx railway company took over operations on the Hanover–Buchholz and Uelzen–Bremen routes, the so-called Heidekreuz (heath cross), from DB Regio.

From mid-2013, the Ministry of Transportation of Lower Saxony examined the reactivation of numerous routes for passenger transport. From an original list of 74 railway lines, the line from Soltau to Lüneburg reached the last eight and was thus in the race for recommissioning until the end. However, in the final decision announced in early 2015, it was not one of the three reactivated lines due to its high cost. The Celle–Soltau and Winsen lines were eliminated in the second selection round.

For a long time there were no lifts or elevators at Soltau station, only a platform subway, so that it was very difficult for wheelchairs or passengers with prams, bicycles or heavy luggage to reach all the platforms. Many took a level crossing over the tracks, intended only for railway employees. When Deutsche Bahn (DB) removed this crossing in 2012, it caused a dispute between the town and DB and the former even threatened a lawsuit. DB persisted with its plan, with Soltau station to be made accessible from 2015/2016 during the Heath Railway modernisation. After further delays, the lifts were finally put into operation in June 2017, before the new pedestrian subway had been completed. As part of this modernisation, which has been underway since 2008, the maximum speed will be raised along the entire route to 120 km/h and will shorten the travel time from Hannover to Buchholz by about half an hour.

The modernisation and electrification of the America line is being discussed in order to make the line more attractive, especially for freight traffic. Also as an alternative to the planned Y-Trasse (Y-route) upgrading of the America line is being discussed, which would increase traffic especially on the line in the Soltau urban area and has already led to protests by residents.

== Buildings and facilities ==
=== Entrance building ===
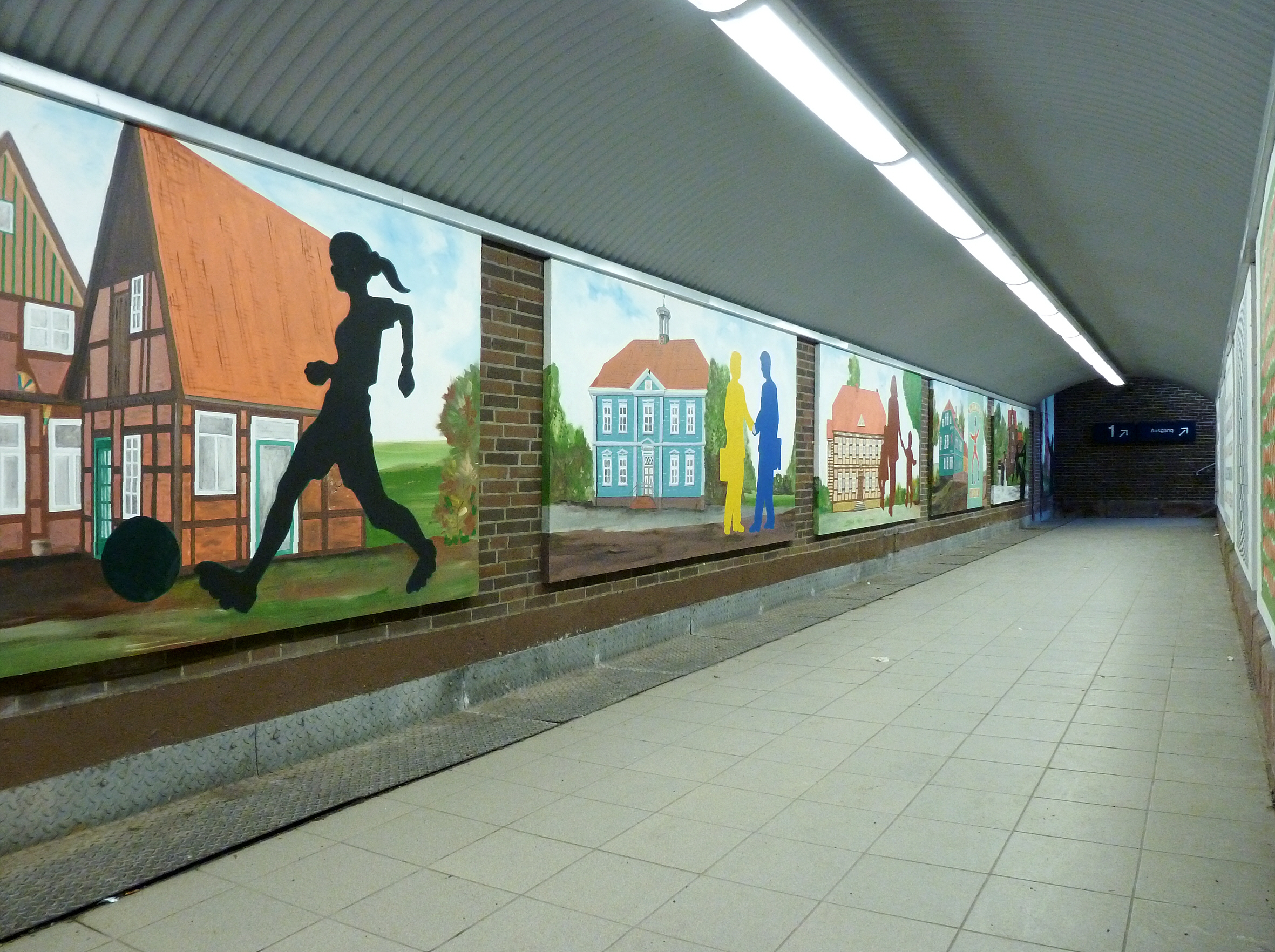
Murals in the platform subway

The stately entrance building is multi-storey and has a total area of 1770 m²; the associated property is 934 m² gross.

In the 1960s, the station building received a vestibule and was repainted in a bright colour. The apartments in the building are empty and the station restaurant and the luggage counter have been closed for a long time. The building only has a lounge and a kiosk with ticket sales. The station was renovated for around €350,000 in 2004. The station building was repainted and benches and showcases were installed. The subway was cleaned and painted. In September 2008 and March 2009, one wall each of the tunnel underpass was decorated by Soltau pupils with pictures of the town and the theme Stiftung Spiel (foundation game).

Deutsche Bahn sold the Soltau station building to a private individual for €72,000 on 4 April 2014. The lounge and kiosk have been open since the sale, but nothing is known about the planned future use of the building.

=== Signal boxes and outbuildings ===
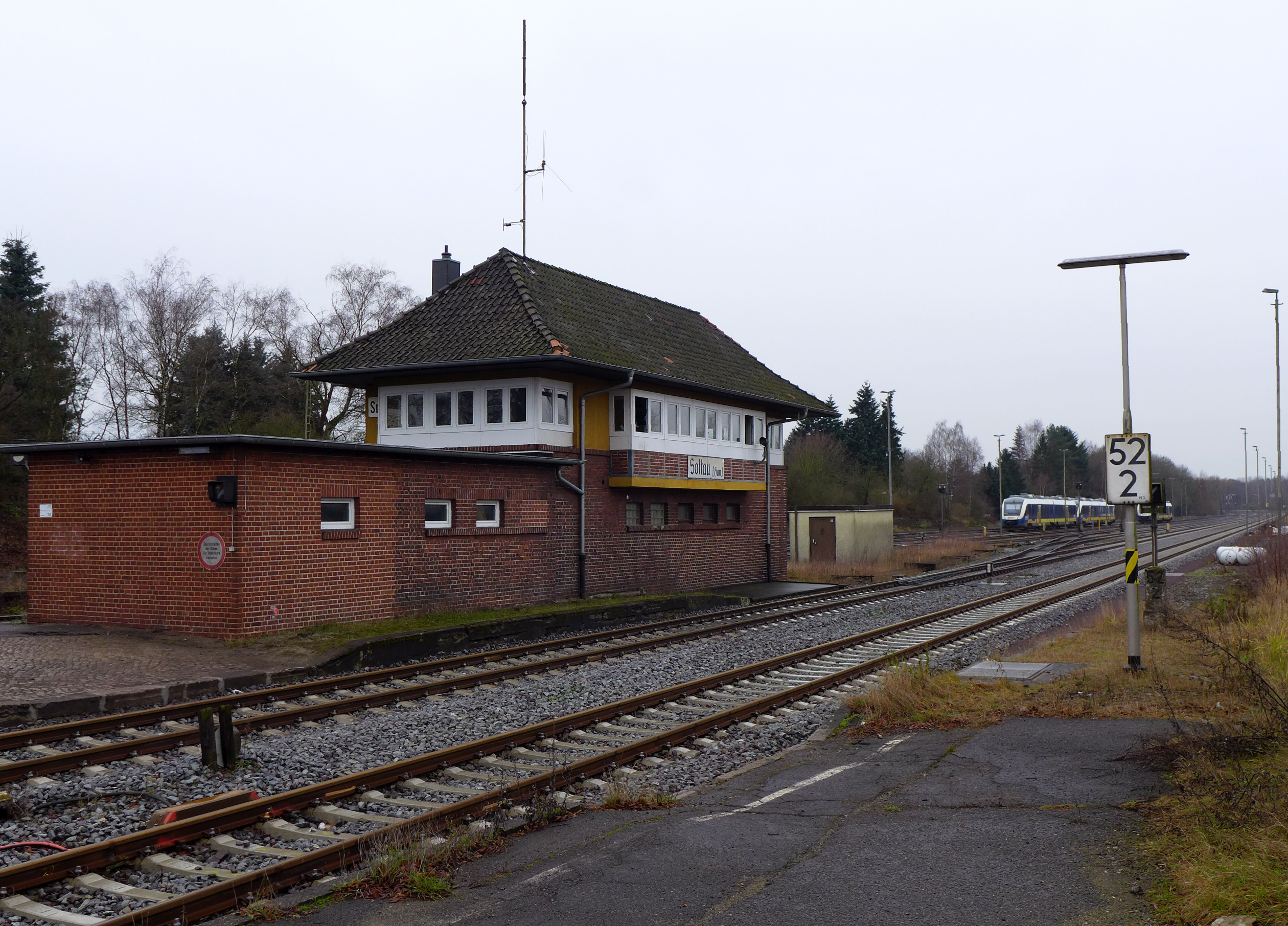
Signal boxes at Soltau (Han) station

The station had three mechanical signal boxes of the Einheit class of 1935, which are still in operation: dispatcher’s signal box Smf and two turnout signal boxes So and Sw. The former express shed is connected to the entrance building.

The building also formerly had a goods shed annexed and there was a locomotive yard. To the east were two toilet buildings (latrines), two stables and a residence. On the south side were the facilities of the locomotive yard with a four-stall shed, a coal store, oil store and a washing stall. The Bahnmeisterei (the office of the head of track maintenance) lay west of the ramps of the loading road.

Soltau station changed little over time. Some outbuildings have been demolished and there is now a bus station. The local Social Democratic Party of Germany has set up an office in the express goods shed and a sheltered workshop in the depot.

=== Railway tracks and platforms ===
Track plan of Soltau (Han) station (as of 2015)

Soltau station has three platforms, which are connected by a pedestrian tunnel. There are four tracks available for passenger traffic. The platform next to the entrance building gives access to track 1 (Uelzen–Langwedel railway), there is an island platform for tracks 2 (Langwedel – Uelzen) and 5 OST (Buchholz – Walsrode/Langwedel) as well as an “intermediate” platform (which has only one platform edge and is only accessible by level crossing) on track 7 (Langwedel/Walsrode – Buchholz).

Track 3 is used as a siding and a headshunt towards Langwedel and track 4 for freight traffic. Track 6 and track section 5 WES are still used as sidings by Deutsche Bahn. There are other sidings.

== Transport services ==
=== Passenger services ===
Currently only the Heath Railway and the America Line are served by passenger services at Soltau (Han) station. The two lines were operated by the private railway company erixx until December 2021. These services are now operated by Deutsche Bahn subsidiary Start Niedersachsen Mitte. The Heath Railway from Hanover to Buchholz generally stops hourly, the Uelzen–Bremen line is usually served every two hours.

Service	Line	Route	KBS	Rolling stock
RB 37	America Line/Uelzener Bahn	Bremen Hbf – Langwedel – Soltau (Han) – Munster – Uelzen	116	LINT 41
RB 37	Heath Railway	Hanover – Walsrode – Soltau (Han) – Schneverdingen – Buchholz	123	LINT 41

In passenger transport, Soltau station is now mainly used by commuters, students and day trippers to the Heide Park, the Soltau Therme (spa) or the Designer Outlet Soltau. According to Deutsche Bahn information, 1,237 people use the station each day as a destination and transfer point (as of November 2013). Soltau station has belonged since 1 January 2008 to the HVV area for season tickets. It is also planned to extend the GVH area to cover the station.

Occasionally the lines of the OHE to Lüneburg and Celle are used by individual heritage railway trips, for instance the Heide Express operated by the Arbeitsgemeinschaft Verkehrsfreunde Lüneburg e. V. In addition, the Ameisenbär (anteater), a historic railcar of the Wismar class from 1937 is operated in the summer from Soltau via Bispingen to Döhle.

=== Freight ===
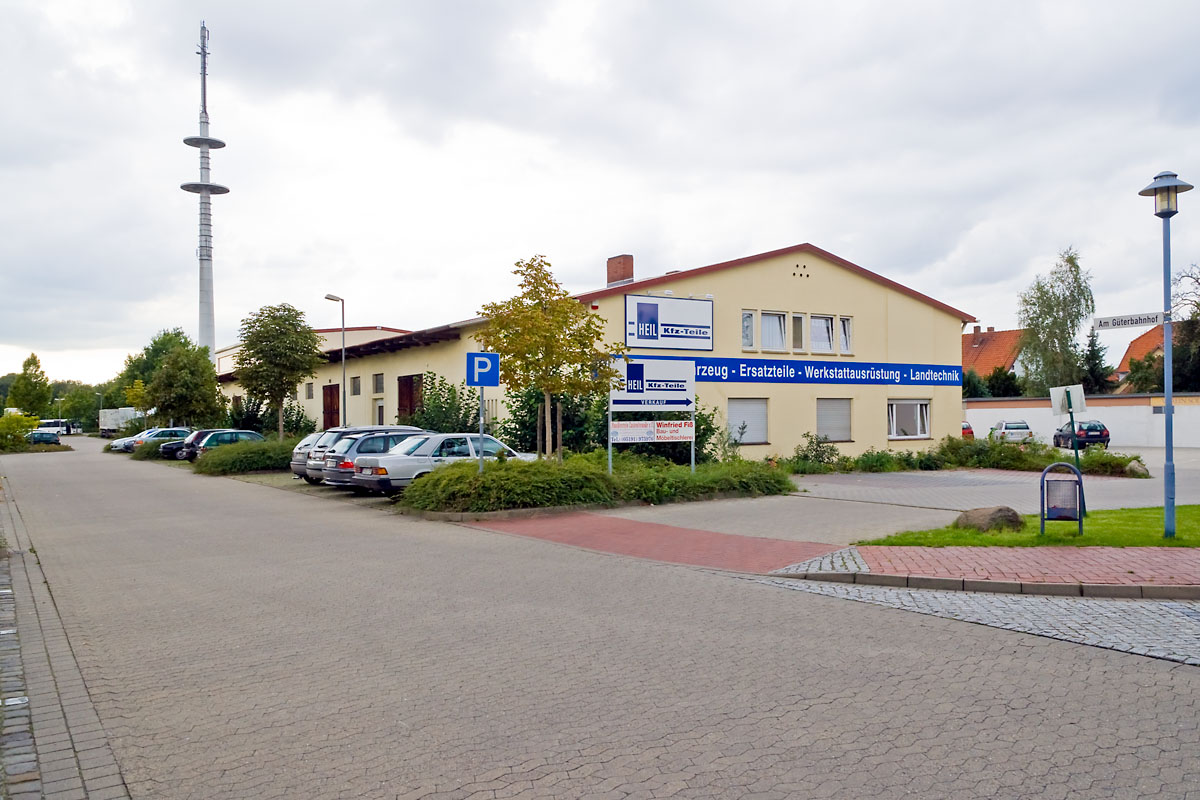
Buildings of the former DB freight yard, which has lost its sidings and is used commercially

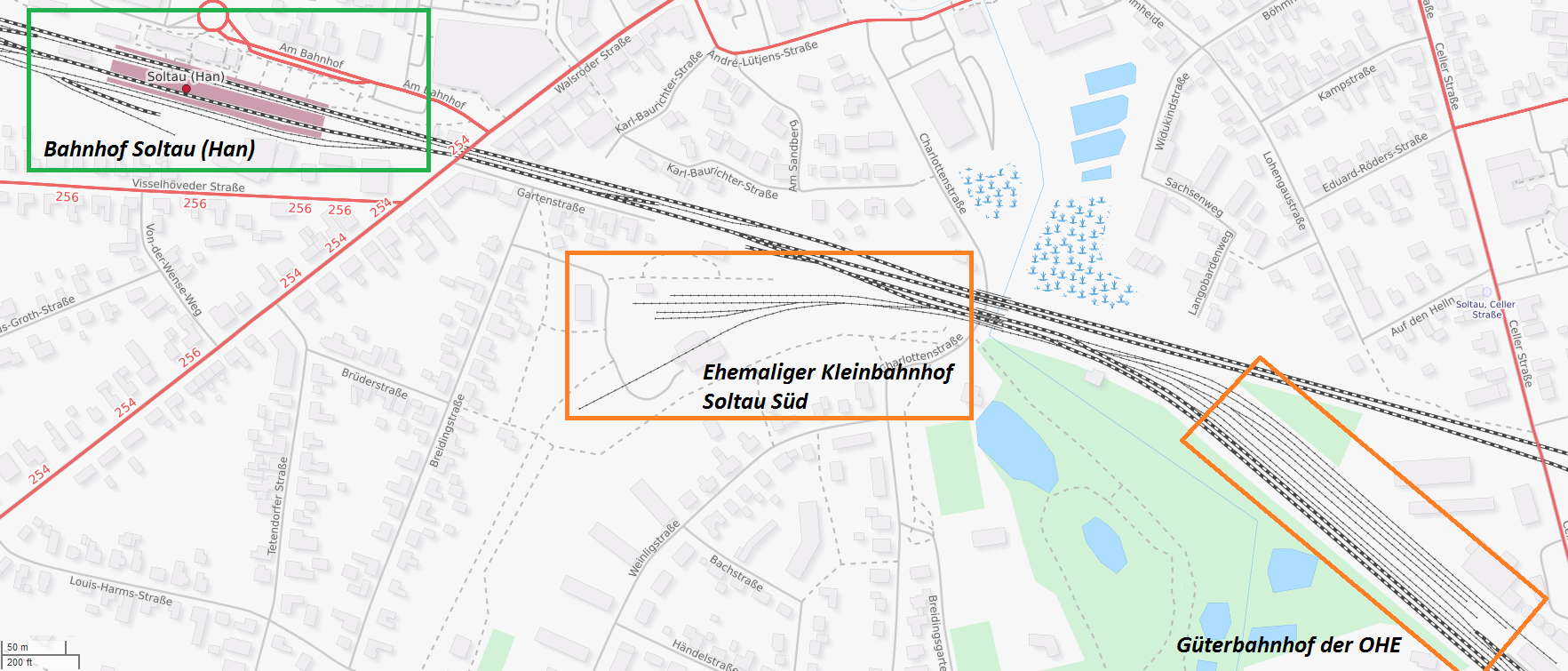
Map of Soltau (Han) and Soltau (Han) Süd stations

The freight facilities were located in the northwest part of the station. They are no longer in operation. Some buildings have been preserved, but the yard has lost its sidings and is no longer owned by Deutsche Bahn. They are used commercially. The street name of Am Güterbahnhof (at the freight yard) recalls its earlier use. Soltau (Han) station itself is usually no longer used for freight transport as it is handled at the freight yard at the Soltau (Han) Süd station of the Osthannoversche Eisenbahnen (OHE), which is only a few hundred metres away and has a track connection. The station is therefore affected mainly by through traffic.

=== Bus services ===
Directly in front of the station there is a bus stop. Nine bus lines of the Verkehrsgemeinschaft Nordost-Niedersachsen (VNN) connect the station with the surrounding towns of Schneverdingen (Linie 106), Bispingen (154), Neuenkirchen (205), Munster (305) or Wietzendorf (355) and the Soltau suburbs. Special services to Heide-Park and Designer Outlet Soltau are also operated.

Numerous tour operators also operate to Soltau (Han) station. Until April 2014, the station was a stop of the daily Cuxhaven–Berlin long-distance bus route operated by Berlin Linien Bus-Gesellschaft.
