= Langwedel station =

Railway station in Langwedel, Germany

Langwedel
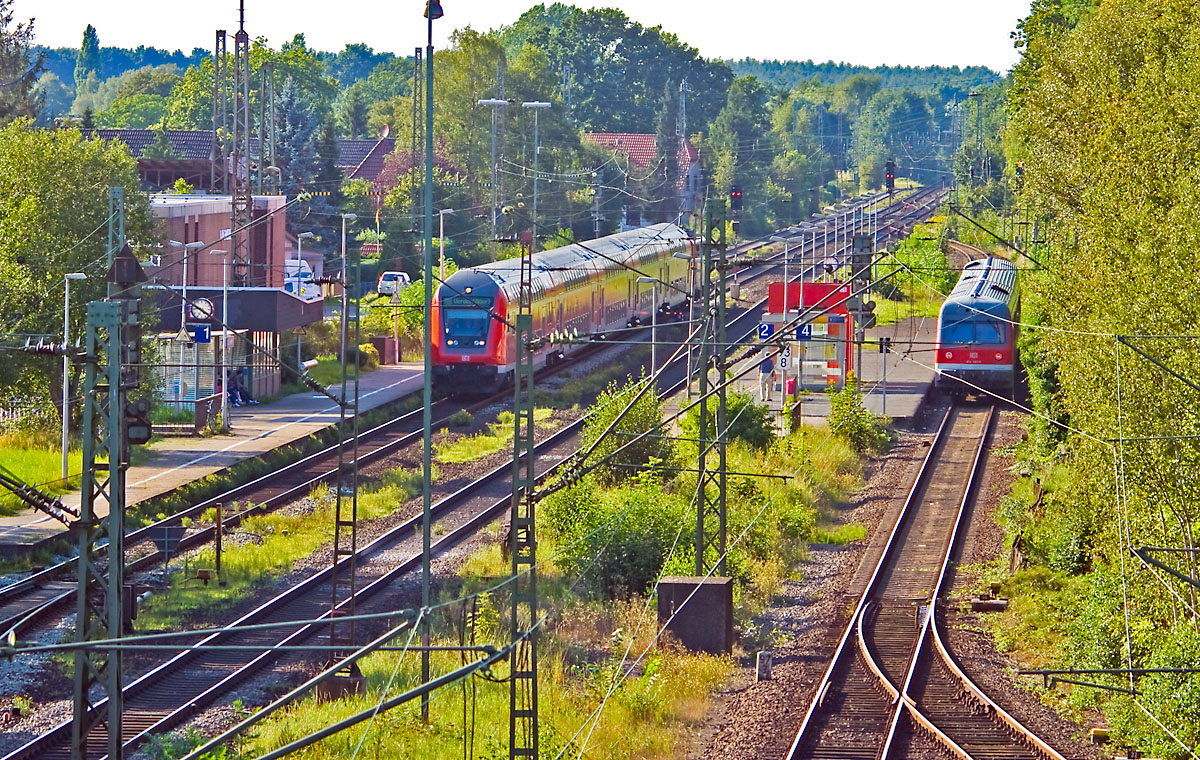
- Langwedel railway station

General information
- Location: Langwedel, Lower Saxony; Germany
- Coordinates: 52.5839°N 9.1144°E
- Lines: Bremen–Hanover railway Uelzen–Langwedel railway
- Platforms: 3

Other information
- Fare zone: VBN: 120

Services
Preceding station	Start	Following station
Achim towards Bremen Hbf	RB 37	Visselhövede towards Uelzen
Preceding station	Bremen S-Bahn	Following station
Etelsen towards Bremen-Farge	RS1	Verden (Aller) Terminus
Location
- Location within Lower Saxony

Langwedel (German: Bahnhof Langwedel) is a railway station located in Langwedel, Germany. The station is located on the Bremen–Hanover railway and Uelzen–Langwedel railway. The train services are operated by Erixx and NordWestBahn. The station has been part of the Bremen S-Bahn since December 2010.

== Train services ==
The following services currently call at the station:

- Local services ERIXX Der Heidesprinter Bremen - Soltau - Uelzen
- Bremen S-Bahn services RS1 Bremen-Farge - Bremen-Vegesack - Bremen - Verden
