= Bremen State Railway =

The Bremen State Railway (German: Bremer Staatsbahn) was a railway line built by the Free Hanseatic City of Bremen on Prussian state territory. In spite of its name and although owned by the state it was operated under Prussian law as a private railway. Constructionally it formed the 97 km long Uelzen–Langwedel railway, the western section of the America Line.

After the annexation of the Kingdom of Hanover by Prussia and the foundation of the North German Confederation Bremen had a major interest in a shorter railway link to Berlin, in order to improve the competitiveness of its ports. After Prussia had refused to pay a proportion of the costs, Bremen decided to construct the line at its own expense. The obligatory state treaty with Prussia was concluded on 17 July 1870. Because funding from Bremen's national budget was not immediately available as a result of the cost of the recently completed Weser diversion, the Union Bank in Berlin was engaged and they had the line built at a cost of 2 million talers. The Magdeburg-Halberstadt Railway Company was contracted to operate the railway, the contract being signed on 20 May 1870, i.e. before the state treaty. The company had also been given running powers on the Stendal–Salzwedel–Uelzen line.

Construction could not start until after Franco-Prussian War. The line was taken into service for goods traffic on 15 April 1873; passenger services began a month later. The freight rates for transportation between Berlin and Bremen over this route were the same as on the Berlin-Hamburg line. Passengers generally had to change at Stendal however. Up to the end of the Second World War D-Zug express trains ran on the Berlin–Bremen–Wilhelmshaven route over this line and also on the Norddeich-Berlin route. Connexions between Bremen and Berlin via Hamburg or Hanover were much quicker. The line was nicknamed the America Line because there were connexions to emigration ships from Bremerhaven to the United States.

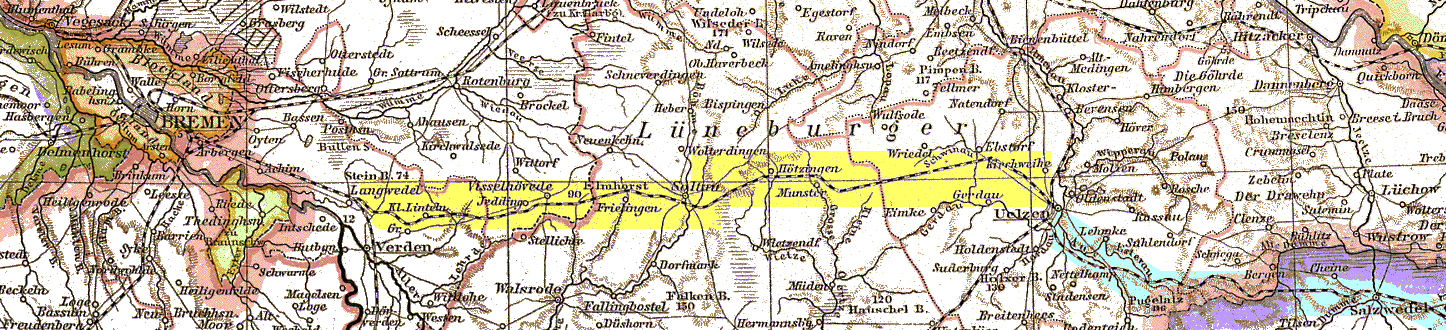
Bahnverbindung Bremen–Altmark(–Berlin) 1880. Key to the railway lines: yellow = Bremen State Railway, light blue = Magdeburg-Halberstadt Railway Company

In 1883 the Bremen State Railway and the Bremen sections of the old Hanoverian railway network were transferred to the ownership of the Prussian state railways for a one-off cost of 36 millionen marks.

As a result of the division of Germany the railway link from Bremen to Stendal via Uelzen was severed between Bergen an der Dumme and Salzwedel from the end of the Second World War to 1999. The Bremen-Langwedel–Uelzen line is worked today by Regionalbahn trains that shuttle between Bremen and Uelzen. Since 2005 more modern passenger shelters and station signs have been installed at several stations. The line is still waiting for a comprehensive overhaul however.

== Literature ==
- Hartmut Roder (Hrsg.): Verkehr in Bremen, Steintor-Verlag, Bremen, 1987, ISBN 3-926028-15-7
