= Regionalverkehre Start Deutschland =

Regionalverkehre Start Deutschland GmbH

Overview
- Contracts: Unterelbe-Netz; Dieselnetz Niedersachsen-Mitte; Taunus-Netz; Dieselnetz Sachsen-Anhalt II
- Main regions: Hesse, Lower Saxony, Sachsen-Anhalt
- Parent company: DB Regio AG
- Headquarters: Frankfurt am Main, Germany
- Reporting mark: D-START
- Dates of operation: December 16, 2016–July 31, 2026

Other
- Website: startgmbh.com

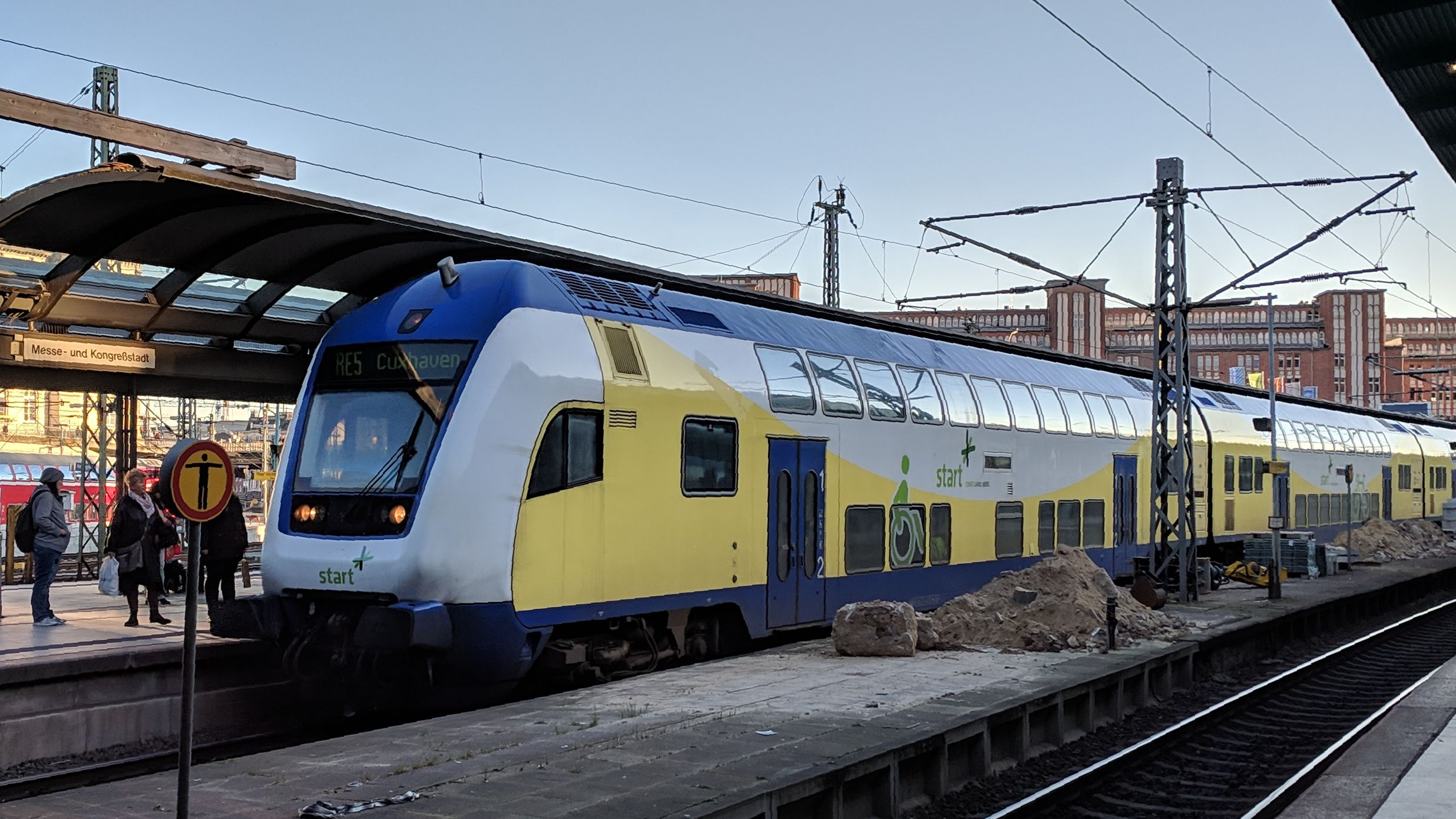
Train in Hauptbahnhof Hamburg

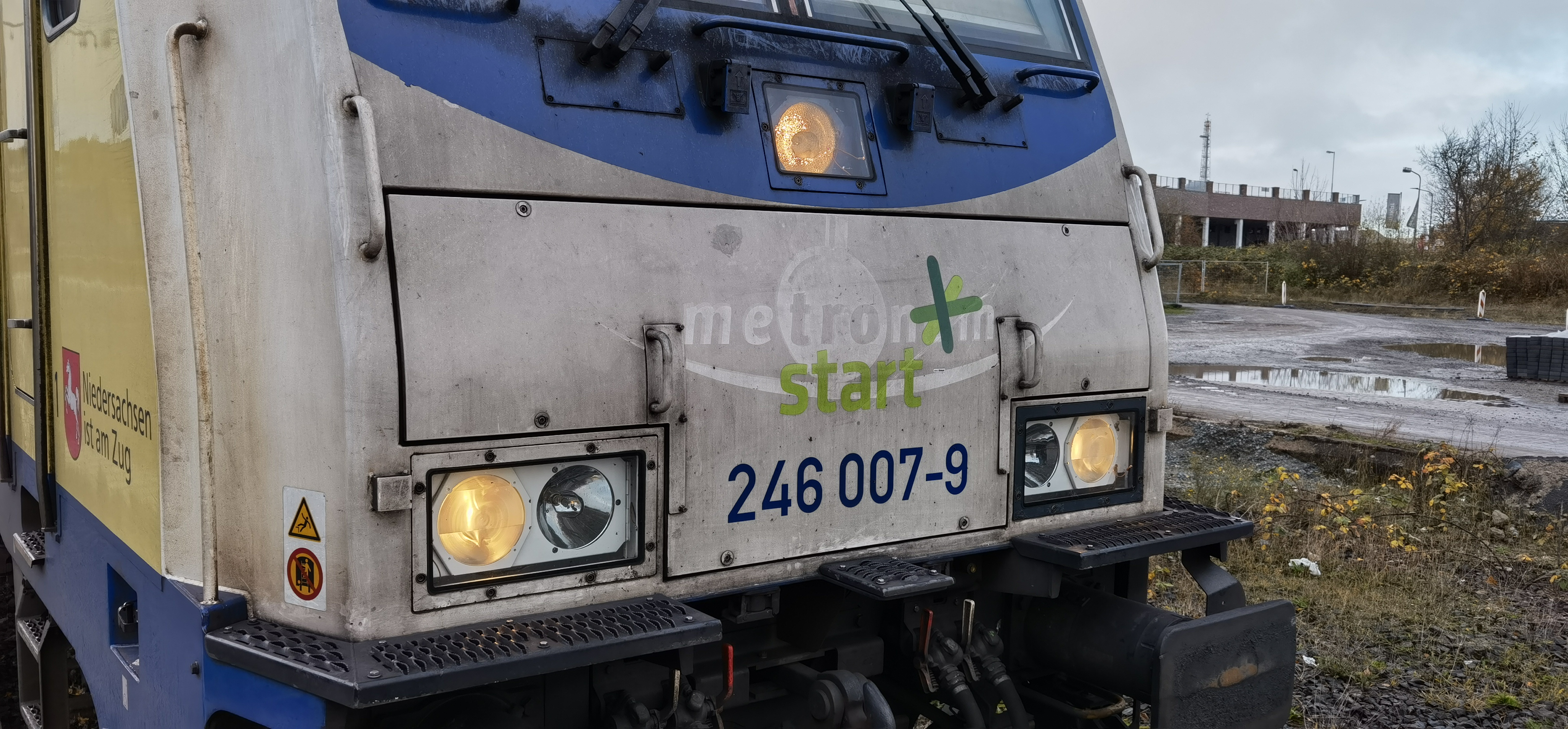
Start logo above the former Metronom logo on a locomotive in Cuxhaven

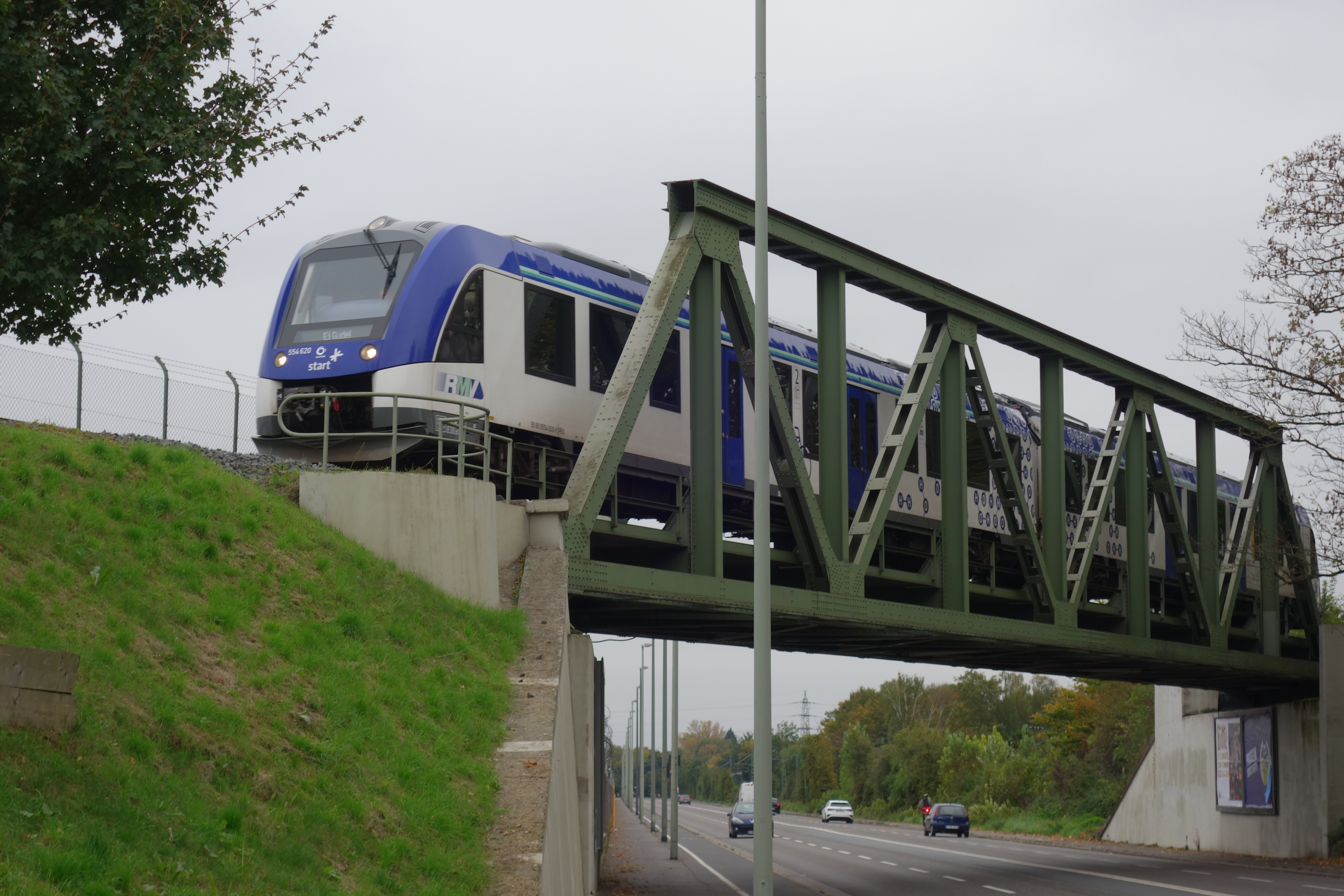
iLint railcar in the area of RMV on the way to its filling station at industrial park Höchst

Regionalverkehre Start Deutschland GmbH was a German railway company that operated local rail passenger transport in Bremen, Hamburg, Hesse, Lower Saxony and North Rhine-Westphalia. The company was owned by Deutsche Bahn through DB Regio AG.

According to its own statements, the company would like to act “lean and dynamic” like a start-up company and thus meet the increasing cost and performance pressure in German local rail passenger transport. This came about, among other things, as a result of the liberalisation of local transport in Germany and the associated tenders in German states. The DB Regio company has lost many routes under this pressure in recent years.

In early 2026, the board of DB Regio AG decided to dissolve Regionalverkehre Stadt Deutschland GmbH and merge its operations into DB Regio AG. This merger took effect on 1 August 2026, with the different regional divisions of DB Regio continuing to operate Start's services.

== Operations ==
=== Line network ===
Line	Route	Network and contract period	Client	Rolling stock	Previous operator	Subsequent operator
RE 5	Hamburg Hbf – Hamburg-Harburg – Buxtehude – Stade – Cuxhaven	Unterelbe-Netz (12.2018–12.2027)	LNVG, HVV	Traxx P160 DE (246) + 5 double-deck coaches (LNVG rolling stock pool)	Metronom	DB Regio Nord
RB 37	Bremen Hbf – Soltau – Uelzen	Dieselnetz Niedersachsen-Mitte (12.2021–12.2029)	LNVG, Region Hannover, NWL, SKUMS, HVV	Alstom Coradia LINT (LNVG rolling stock pool)	erixx	DB Regio Nord
RB 38	Hamburg-Harburg – Buchholz – Soltau – Hannover Hbf	Dieselnetz Niedersachsen-Mitte (12.2021–12.2029)	LNVG, Region Hannover, NWL, SKUMS, HVV	Alstom Coradia LINT (LNVG rolling stock pool)	erixx	DB Regio Nord
RB 77	Hildesheim Hbf – Hameln – Löhne – Bünde/Herford	Dieselnetz Niedersachsen-Mitte (12.2021–12.2029)	LNVG, Region Hannover, NWL, SKUMS, HVV	Alstom Coradia LINT (LNVG rolling stock pool)	NordWestBahn	DB Regio Nord
RB 79	Hildesheim Hbf – Bodenburg	Dieselnetz Niedersachsen-Mitte (12.2021–12.2029)	LNVG, Region Hannover, NWL, SKUMS, HVV	Alstom Coradia LINT (LNVG rolling stock pool)	NordWestBahn	DB Regio Nord
RB 11	Bad Soden – Frankfurt-Höchst (from 01.04.2023)	Taunus-Netz (12.2022–12.2034)	RMV	Alstom Coradia iLINT	Hessische Landesbahn	DB Regio Mitte
RB 12	Königstein – Kelkheim – Frankfurt-Höchst – Frankfurt Hbf	Taunus-Netz (12.2022–12.2034)	RMV	Alstom Coradia iLINT	Hessische Landesbahn	DB Regio Mitte
RB 15	Brandoberndorf – Friedrichsdorf – Bad Homburg (– Frankfurt Hbf)	Taunus-Netz (12.2022–12.2034)	RMV	Alstom Coradia iLINT	Hessische Landesbahn	DB Regio Mitte
RB 16	Friedberg – Friedrichsdorf (– Bad Homburg) (from 01.04.2023)	Taunus-Netz (12.2022–12.2034)	RMV	Alstom Coradia iLINT	Hessische Landesbahn	DB Regio Mitte
HBX (RE 11a)	Berlin Ostbahnhof – Berlin Hbf – Potsdam Hbf – Brandenburg Hbf – Genthin – Burg (Magdeburg) – Magdeburg Hbf – Oschersleben – Halberstadt Hbf – Thale Hbf/Goslar	Dieselnetz Sachsen-Anhalt II (12.2024–12.2032)	NASA, TLBV, RGB	LINT 41	Abellio Rail Mitteldeutschland	DB Regio Südost
RE 4	Halle (Saale) Hbf – Könnern – Sandersleben – Aschersleben – Halberstadt Hbf – Wernigerode Hbf – Goslar	Dieselnetz Sachsen-Anhalt II (12.2024–12.2032)	NASA, TLBV, RGB	LINT 41	Abellio Rail Mitteldeutschland	DB Regio Südost
RE 6	Magdeburg Hbf – Haldensleben – Oebisfelde – Wolfsburg Hbf	Dieselnetz Sachsen-Anhalt II (12.2024–12.2032)	NASA, TLBV, RGB	LINT 41	Abellio Rail Mitteldeutschland	DB Regio Südost
RE 10	Magdeburg Hbf – Schönebeck – Güsten – Sangerhausen – Sömmerda – Erfurt Hbf	Dieselnetz Sachsen-Anhalt II (12.2024–12.2032)	NASA, TLBV, RGB	LINT 41	Abellio Rail Mitteldeutschland	DB Regio Südost
RE 11	Magdeburg Hbf – Oschersleben – Halberstadt Hbf – Quedlinburg – Thale Hbf	Dieselnetz Sachsen-Anhalt II (12.2024–12.2032)	NASA, TLBV, RGB	LINT 41	Abellio Rail Mitteldeutschland	DB Regio Südost
RE 21	Magdeburg Hbf – Oschersleben – Halberstadt Hbf – Wernigerode Hbf – Vienenburg – Goslar	Dieselnetz Sachsen-Anhalt II (12.2024–12.2032)	NASA, TLBV, RGB	LINT 41	Abellio Rail Mitteldeutschland	DB Regio Südost
RE 24	Halle (Saale) Hbf – Könnern – Sandersleben – Aschersleben – Halberstadt Hbf	Dieselnetz Sachsen-Anhalt II (12.2024–12.2032)	NASA, TLBV, RGB	LINT 41	Abellio Rail Mitteldeutschland	DB Regio Südost
RE 31	Magdeburg Hbf – Oschersleben – Halberstadt Hbf – Blankenburg	Dieselnetz Sachsen-Anhalt II (12.2024–12.2032)	NASA, TLBV, RGB	LINT 41	Abellio Rail Mitteldeutschland	DB Regio Südost
RB 35	Stendal Hbf – Gardelegen – Oebisfelde – Wolfsburg Hbf	Dieselnetz Sachsen-Anhalt II (12.2024–12.2032)	NASA, TLBV, RGB	LINT 41	Abellio Rail Mitteldeutschland	DB Regio Südost
RB 36	Magdeburg Hbf – Magdeburg-Neustadt – Barleben – Haldensleben – Oebisfelde – Wolfsburg Hbf	Dieselnetz Sachsen-Anhalt II (12.2024–12.2032)	NASA, TLBV, RGB	LINT 41	Abellio Rail Mitteldeutschland	DB Regio Südost
RB 41	Magdeburg Hbf – Staßfurt – Güsten – Aschersleben	Dieselnetz Sachsen-Anhalt II (12.2024–12.2032)	NASA, TLBV, RGB	LINT 41	Abellio Rail Mitteldeutschland	DB Regio Südost
RB 43	Magdeburg Hbf – Osterweddingen – Oschersleben	Dieselnetz Sachsen-Anhalt II (12.2024–12.2032)	NASA, TLBV, RGB	LINT 41	Abellio Rail Mitteldeutschland	DB Regio Südost
RB 44	Halberstadt Hbf – Wegeleben – Aschersleben	Dieselnetz Sachsen-Anhalt II (12.2024–12.2032)	NASA, TLBV, RGB	LINT 41	Abellio Rail Mitteldeutschland	DB Regio Südost
RB 47	Halle (Saale) Hbf – Könnern – Bernburg Hbf – Calbe (Saale) Ost (– Schönebeck – Magdeburg Hbf)	Dieselnetz Sachsen-Anhalt II (12.2024–12.2032)	NASA, TLBV, RGB	LINT 41	Abellio Rail Mitteldeutschland	DB Regio Südost
RB 50	Dessau Hbf – Köthen – Bernburg Hbf – Güsten – Aschersleben	Dieselnetz Sachsen-Anhalt II (12.2024–12.2032)	NASA, TLBV, RGB	LINT 41	Abellio Rail Mitteldeutschland	DB Regio Südost
RB 77	Naumburg (Saale) Ost – Naumburg (Saale) Hbf – Laucha – Nebra – Wangen	Dieselnetz Sachsen-Anhalt II (12.2024–12.2032)	NASA, TLBV, RGB	LINT 41	Abellio Rail Mitteldeutschland	DB Regio Südost

=== Lower Elbe network ===
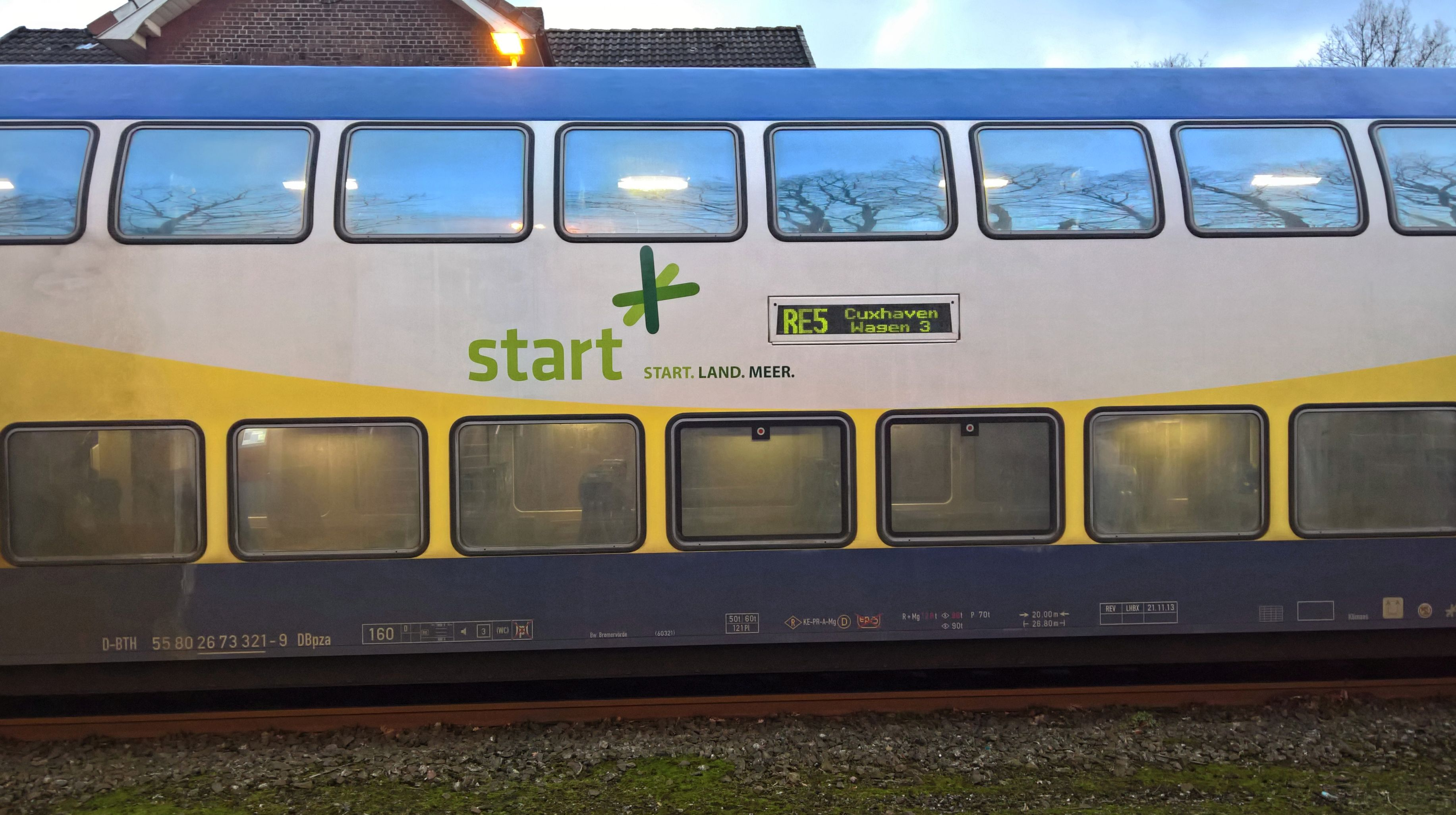
A car of Start Unterelbe in Cadenberge

Regionalverkehre Start Deutschland took over its first network covering the operation of the Hamburg Hbf–Cuxhaven (RE 5) line from December 2018 to December 2027 with its subsidiary Verkehrsgesellschaft Start Unterelbe, based in Cuxhaven. This line was previously operated by Metronom Eisenbahngesellschaft. 8 diesel locomotives and 38 double-decker carriages from the state-owned LNVG vehicle pool, which were already in use on the route, were leased for these operations. The previous Metronom employees were also offered a job. As before, the trains were maintained by the manufacturer Bombardier (now part of Alstom) in Bremervörde.

On 1 August 2026, DB Regio AG, Region Nord took over the operations of the Unterelbe-Netz.

=== Lower Saxony-Central diesel network (Dieselnetz Niedersachsen-Mitte) ===
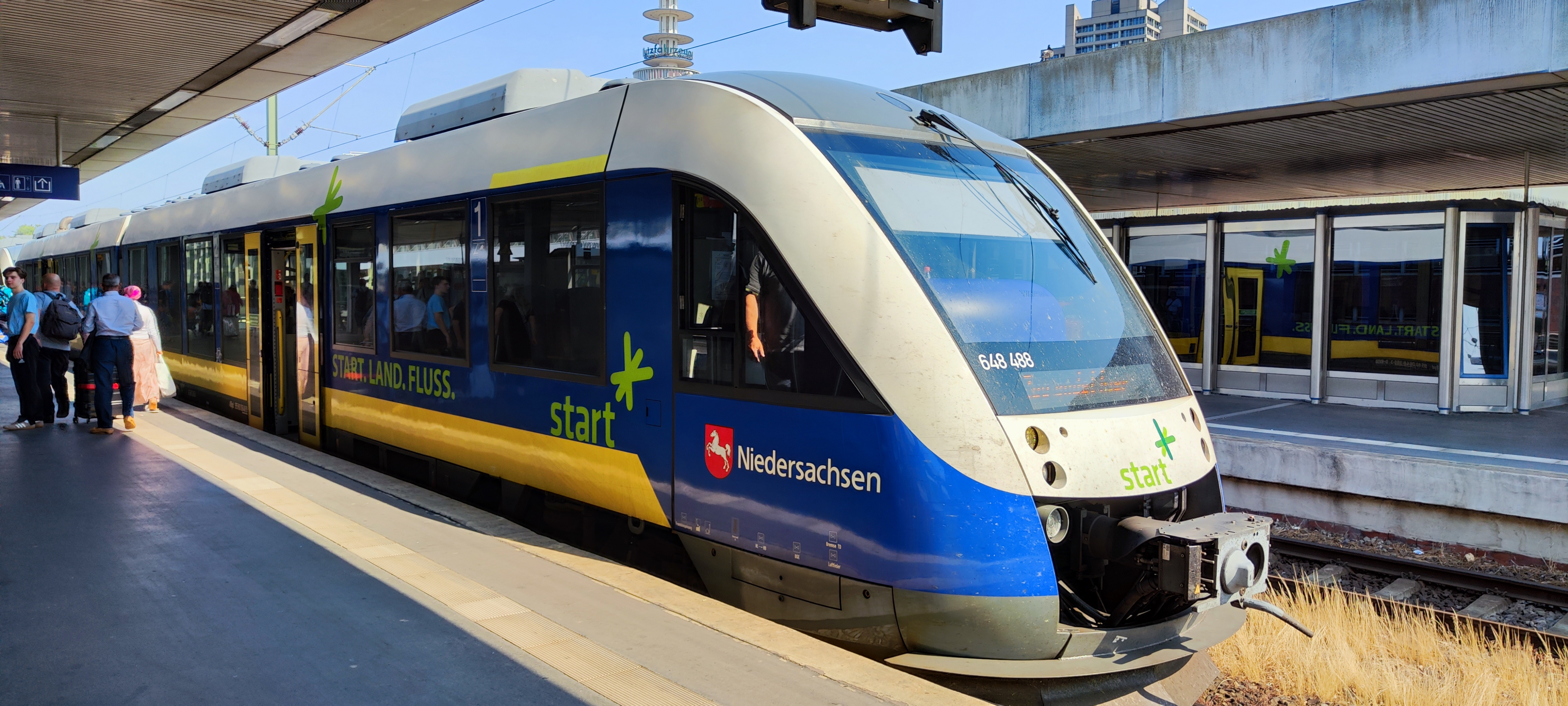
LINT 41 of Dieselnetz Niedersachsen-Mitte

Landesnahverkehrsgesellschaft Niedersachsen (LNVG) and Nahverkehr Westfalen-Lippe (NWL) initially awarded the Lower Saxony-Central diesel network to DB Regio in September 2020. In November 2020, it was announced that the network would be transferred to Regionalverkehre Start Deutschland GmbH, which began operations in December 2021.

The network comprises two sub-networks that were previously awarded separately: lines RB 37 (Bremen Hbf–Soltau–Uelzen) and RB 38 (Hannover Hbf–Soltau–Buchholz (Nordheide)–Hamburg-Harburg) were previously operated as the Heidekreuz by erixx, the Heidesprinter. The Weser-/Lammetalbahn network with lines RB 77 (Hildesheim Hbf–Hameln–Löhne–Bünde) and RB 79 (Hildesheim–Bodenburg) was previously operated by NordWestBahn.

Alstom Coradia LINT vehicles from the LNVG vehicle pool continued to be used. The headquarters of Start Niedersachsen Mitte has been in Soltau since November 2021. There is a branch in Hanover and Hildesheim. As of 2021, around 170 employees are employed.

After taking over the network, Start Niedersachsen was criticised because its operations had become unreliable. There were increasing numbers of cancelled services, delays and missed connections, and passengers were not well informed. Start was threatened with a warning from the responsible authority, the Landesnahverkehrsgesellschaft Niedersachsen (LNVG). Ultimately, in November 2022, Start Niedersachsen received a contractual penalty of €2.7 million for cancelled and delayed trains.Start has appealed against the penalties imposed because the vehicles leased to Start by the LNVG, as the owner, are not in an age-appropriate and very poor condition.

After problems with maintenance processes due to the poor general condition of the vehicles, there were again significant outages from June 2023, and many trains only ran for a shortened period. Start Niedersachsen-Mitte had to stop train services on the RB 37 line (Uelzen–Langwedel railway) for several weeks. In July 2023, Start Niedersachsen-Mitte received a warning from the Landesnahverkehrsgesellschaft Niedersachsen (LNVG). The passenger association Pro Bahn called on the Lower Saxony State Local Transport Company to terminate the contract with Start Niedersachsen-Mitte and prepare for emergency operations. In response to renewed restrictions, particularly on line RB 37 (Bremen–Soltau–Uelzen), Pro Bahn reiterated its demand in February 2024 that the LNVG should not shy away from terminating the transport contract, after the previous warning had not led to a stabilisation of the situation and the situation remained unreasonable. The LNVG again called on Start to get the problems with vehicle maintenance under control. Start rejected the allegations and once again pointed out the very poor general condition of the vehicles when they were taken over from the previous operators.

In March 2024, the Landesnahverkehrsgesellschaft Niedersachsen (LNVG) published key figures on operational quality, in which Start Niedersachsen Mitte performed poorly compared to other transport companies. In 2023, most trains in the Start Niedersachsen Mitte network were cancelled in the LNVG area, the lowest reliability in terms of short-term cancellations in the LNVG area in 2023 was shown by lines RB 37 (Bremen Hbf–Soltau–Uelzen) and RB 77 (Hildesheim Hbf–Hameln–Löhne–Bünde). The line RB 38 (Hannover Hbf–Soltau–Buchholz (Nordheide)–Hamburg-Harburg) had the lowest punctuality rate (up to 5 minutes) of all lines examined in 2023 (68% compared to 86% of local trains in Lower Saxony as a whole). Due to the poor performance, the LNVG called on the DB Group to intervene at Start Niedersachsen Mitte.

On 1 August 2026, DB Regio AG, Region Nord took over the operations of the Dieselnetz Niedersachsen-Mitte.

=== Taunus-Netz ===
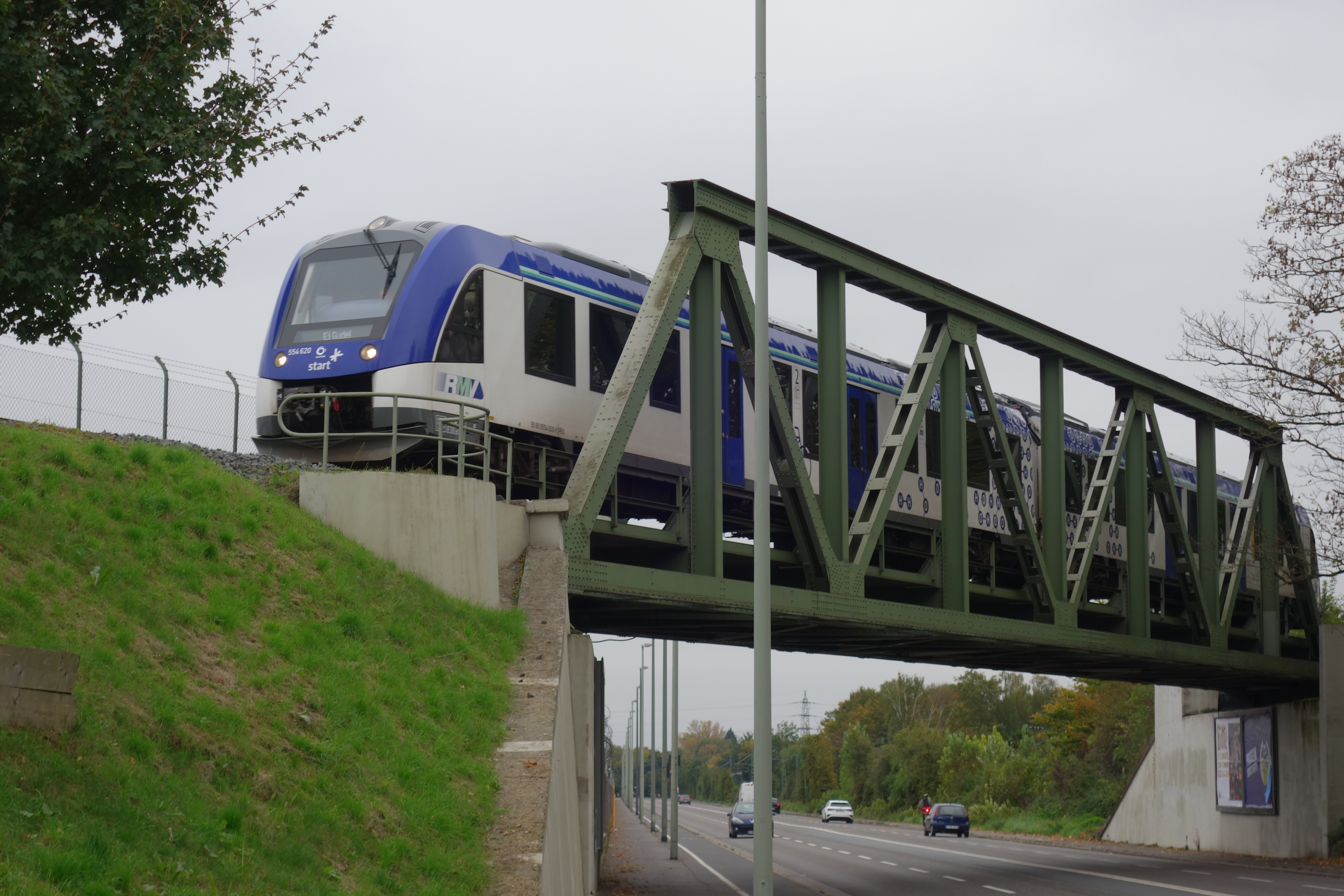
iLint railcar on its way to the hydrogen filling station at the Höchst industrial park

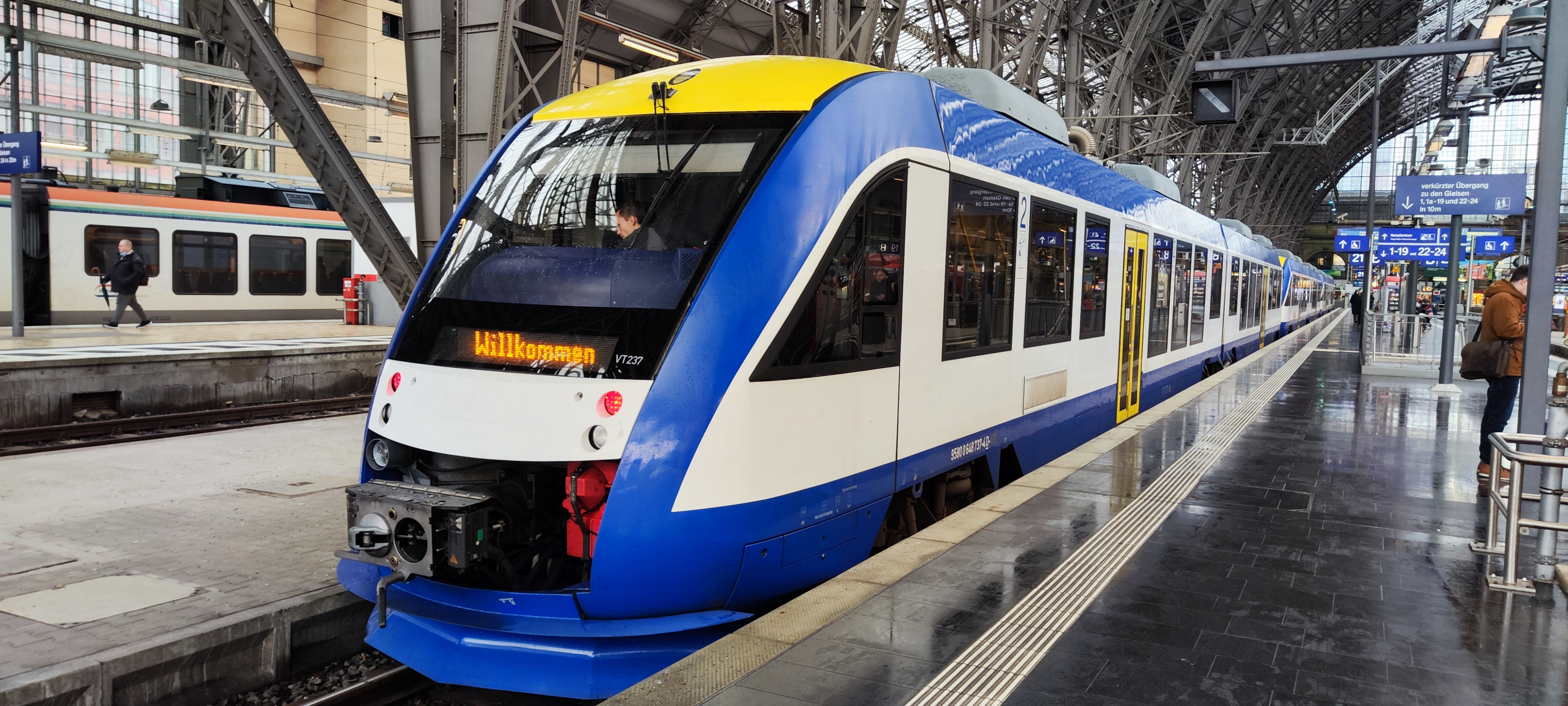
LINT 41 set of the Taunus network still without logo shortly after timetable change

In March 2022, Rhein-Main-Verkehrsverbund (RMV) announced that Start would take over operations in the Taunus network from December 2022. This includes the services on lines RB 11 (Bad Soden am Taunus – Frankfurt (Main) Höchst), RB 12 (Frankfurt (Main) – Königstein (Taunus)), RB 15 (Frankfurt (Main) (HVZ) – Bad Homburg – Brandoberndorf) and RB 16 (Bad Homburg – Friedberg (Hess)); these lines were previously operated by Hessische Landesbahn. 27 new trains from the Alstom Group of the iLINT class with hydrogen propulsion were to be used. Since not enough new vehicles were delivered for the start of operations, Start also leased vehicles (including Deutsche Bahn Bombardier Talent sets from Dortmund) in the first few months.

In December 2022, the takeover of the Taunus network led to significant disruptions in the Hochtaunus district; rail traffic was temporarily completely suspended. An as yet unspecified IT problem ensured that passengers were not informed about replacement buses either online or on the display boards at the stations during rail disruptions. The project partners RMV, Alstom (provider of the hydrogen vehicles) and Infraserv (provider of the hydrogen) also reported in a joint press release about considerable difficulties in taking over operations due to technical problems with the hydrogen trains.

After months of restrictions due to the increasing deterioration of the hydrogen trains, the RMV has had to award the operation of the RB 11 line to the S-Bahn Rhein-Main instead of to Start Regionalverkehre Deutschland from 25 September 2023 "until further notice".

On 1 August 2026, DB Regio AG, Region Mitte took over the operations of the Taunus-Netz.

=== Maas-Wupper-Express ===
In December 2021, Verkehrsverbund Rhein-Ruhr (VRR), Nahverkehr Westfalen-Lippe (NWL) and the Dutch Ministry of Infrastructure and Water Management announced that from December 2026, Regionalverkehre Start Deutschland GmbH would operate the hourly regional express line Maas-Wupper-Express (RE 13) between Hamm, Hagen, Wuppertal, Düsseldorf, Mönchengladbach, Venlo and Eindhoven with multi-system-capable Stadler Flirt vehicles. The line is currently operated by Eurobahn and only runs between Venlo and Hamm.

Since DB Regio took over Start on 1 August 2026, the contract will be operated by DB Regio AG, Region NRW instead.

=== Netz Mitteldeutschland ===
On 7 July 2023, Nahverkehrsservice Sachsen-Anhalt (NASA) awarded Regionalverkehre Start Deutschland GmbH the contract for the Sachsen-Anhalt Dieselnetz (DISA II)—now with the new name of Mitteldeutschland (Central Germany). Operations will begin with the timetable change in December 2024 and will run for 8 years.

57 Alstom Coradia LINT 41 sets are being used, of which 54 were taken over as part of the tender due to the insolvency proceedings of the previous operator Abellio Rail Mitteldeutschland, three vehicles are leased. These will continue to be maintained by Verkehrs Industrie Systeme Halberstadt.

On 1 August 2026, DB Regio AG, Region Südost took over the operations of the Dieselnetz Sachsen-Anhalt II.
