= Uelzen station =

Railway station in Germany

Uelzen
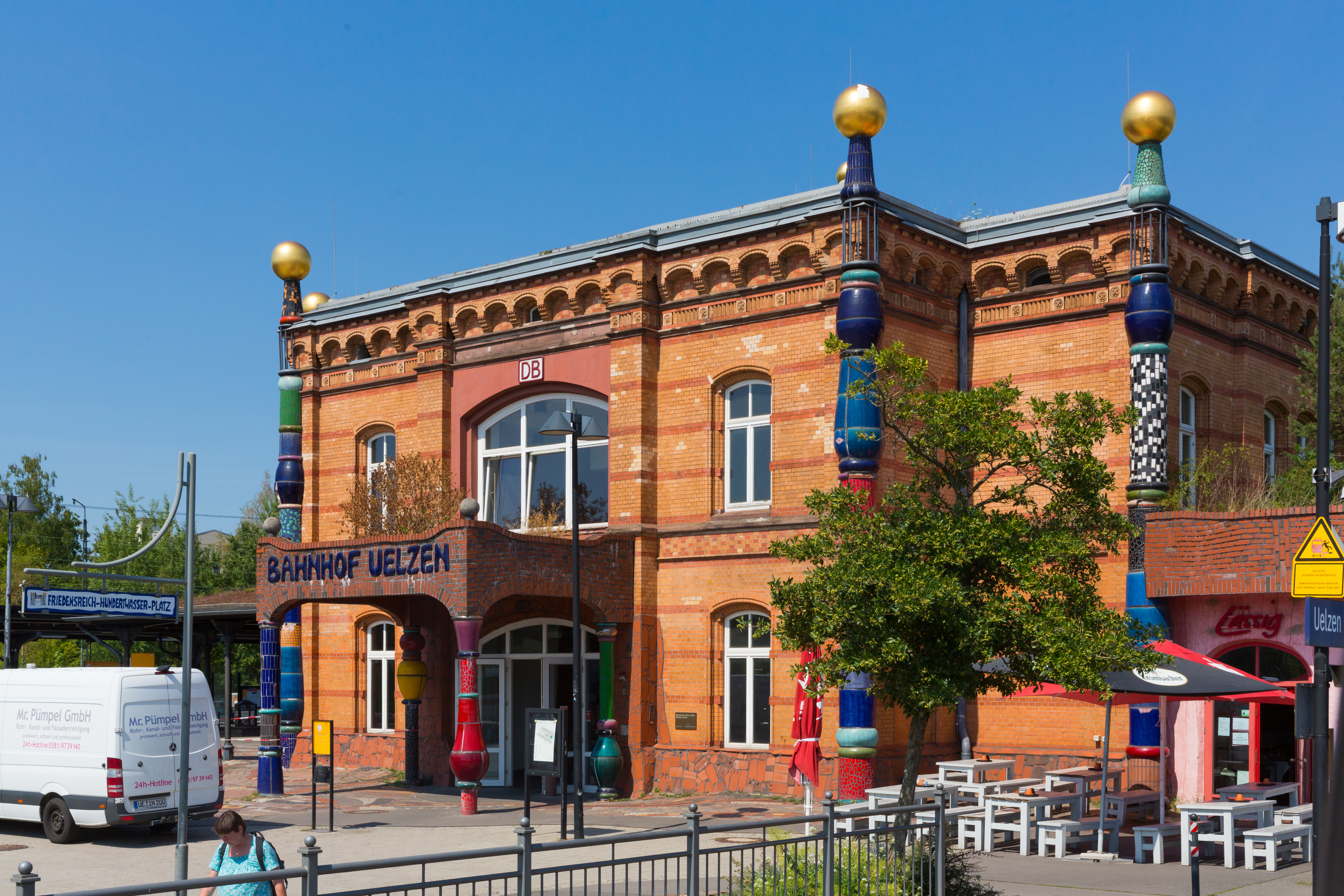
- Station hall in Hundertwasser style

General information
- Other names: Hundertwasser Bahnhof
- Location: Uelzen, Lower Saxony; Germany
- Coordinates: 52°58′11″N 10°33′11″E
- Owner: Deutsche Bahn
- Operator: DB Station&Service
- Lines: Hanover–Hamburg; Uelzen–Langwedel; Stendal–Uelzen; Brunswick–Uelzen
- Platforms: 4
- Tracks: 7

Construction
- Accessible: Yes

Other information
- Station code: 6310
- DS100 code: HU
- Category: 2
- Fare zone: VNN: H/U207 (buses only); HVV: H/1207 (VNN transitional tariff, season tickets only)
- Website: www.bahnhof.de

History
- Opened: 1847

Key dates
- 1847: Hanoverian station
- 1855: Halberstädter station
- 1888: Unified station
- 2000: Hundertwasser station

Services
Preceding station	DB Fernverkehr	Following station
Lüneburg One-way operation	ICE 11	Celle towards München Hbf
Lüneburg towards Hamburg Hbf	ICE 12	Celle One-way operation
Hamburg Hbf Terminus	ICE/ECE 20	Hannover Hbf towards Basel SBB
Preceding station	Metronom	Following station
Terminus	RE 2	Suderburg towards Göttingen
Bad Bevensen towards Hamburg Hbf	RE 3	Terminus
Preceding station	DB Regio Südost	Following station
Terminus	RE 20	Stederdorf towards Magdeburg Hbf
Preceding station	Start	Following station
Ebsdorf towards Bremen Hbf	RB 37	Terminus
Preceding station		Following station
Terminus	RB 47	Stederdorf towards Braunschweig Hbf
Location

Uelzen (German: Bahnhof Uelzen) is a railway station located in Uelzen, Germany, at the eastern edge of the Lüneburg Heath Nature Park. The station is located on the Hannover–Hamburg railway, Uelzen–Langwedel railway, Stendal–Uelzen railway and Brunswick–Uelzen railway. The train services are operated by Deutsche Bahn, Metronom and Erixx.

The original station was renovated for Expo 2000 following plans by the Austrian artist and architect Friedensreich Hundertwasser. As an "environmentally culturally oriented" station, the Uelzen station is now marketed as the Hundertwasser-Bahnhof Uelzen (Hundertwasser Station, Uelzen). Today it is one of the town's popular tourist attractions.

== History ==
After 1847, the stretch of the Royal Hanoverian State Railways's line between Hamburg and Hanover was modified, coursing from Hanover to Celle, then through Uelzen, finally arriving at the Hamburg-Harburg station. Due to this modification, the Uelzen station was built. The original temporary entrance hall was later replaced with a truss structure. When the number of travelers continued to increase, a new Tudor-style Hanoverian station was built.

After the annexation of the Kingdom of Hanover by Prussia in 1866 during the Austro-Prussian War, the America Line was opened in 1873, a direct connection between Berlin, the capital, and the naval fleet at Wilhelmshaven. Three railway companies took part in the construction of the Uelzen station. In 1888 the station was once again renovated, this time in Wilhelmian style.

In 1900, the Brunswick–Uelzen railway was opened, which connects Wieren to Brunswick by way of Uelzen and Gifhorn. In 1924, the Uelzen–Dannenberg railway was built, although later put out of service in 1975. After the Second World War, the America Line between Bergen an der Dumme and Salzwedel was decommissioned. Later, the use of the section between Wieren and Nienbergen was discontinued, before the section to Salzwedel returned to use after German reunification.

== Train services ==
In the 2026 timetable, the following services stopped at the station:

Line	Route	Interval (min)	Operator
ICE 11	Hamburg-Altona – Hamburg – Uelzen – Hanover – Kassel – Frankfurt – Mannheim – Stuttgart – Munich	One train at night	DB Fernverkehr
ICE/ECE 20	Hamburg-Altona – Hamburg – Uelzen – Hanover – Kassel – Frankfurt – Mannheim – Karlsruhe – Freiburg – Basel SBB	2 train pairs	DB Fernverkehr
RE 2	Uelzen – Celle – Hannover – Elze – Kreiensen – Göttingen	120	metronom
RE 3	(Hannover – Celle –) Uelzen – Lüneburg – Winsen – Hamburg	(120) 60	metronom
RE 20	Uelzen – Salzwedel – Hohenwulsch – Stendal – Tangerhütte – Magdeburg	120	DB Regio Südost
RB 31	Uelzen – Lüneburg – Winsen – Hamburg-Harburg – Hamburg	Individual services	metronom
RB 37	Uelzen – Munster – Soltau – Langwedel – Bremen	120	Regionalverkehre Start Deutschland
RB 47	Uelzen – Wittingen – Wahrenholz – Gifhorn – Meine – Braunschweig	120	erixx

Until mid-December 2014 the station was also served by EuroCity "Wawel", which used to run once daily between Hamburg Altona and Wrocław Główny six days a week.

== Expo 2000 ==
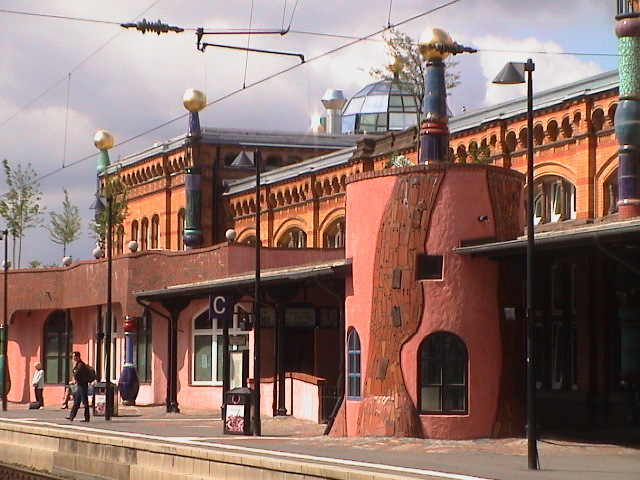
Design of the main platform

After the station was heavily damaged as a result of the Second World War and various additions and renovations, the station lost its original structural style. In the mid-1990s, an improved renovation was conceptualized. The main focus was to change the station to be "environmentally and culturally oriented". The first step of the redesign, completed in 1997, was to install photovoltaic cells on the roof of the station. Further additions included the removal of the unused tracks and rail yard areas.

On December 16, 1999, the developmental concept put forth by Bahnhof Uelzen e.V. was publicized for the worldwide Expo 2000. In addition to various local authorities, the project was supported by the Deutsche Bahn. The focus of the project was the transformation of the building and the platforms following the plans of the Viennese architect Friedensreich Hundertwasser.

On November 25, 2000, the new station was ceremoniously dedicated. Since then, it has become a tourist attraction and welcomes over 450,000 visitors every year. As part of the "Niedersachsen ist am Zug!" ("It’s Lower Saxony’s Turn / Lower Saxony Rides the Train!") developmental program promoted by the federal government and Lower Saxony between 2006 and 2007, the station was modernized at a price of €5 million. Through this modernization, all platforms were brought up to code and outfitted with provisions for physically disabled patrons. Furthermore, unfinished details from Hundertwasser's original design were realized.

== See also ==
- Rail transport in Germany
- Railway stations in Germany
