= Stendal–Uelzen railway =

Railway line in Germany

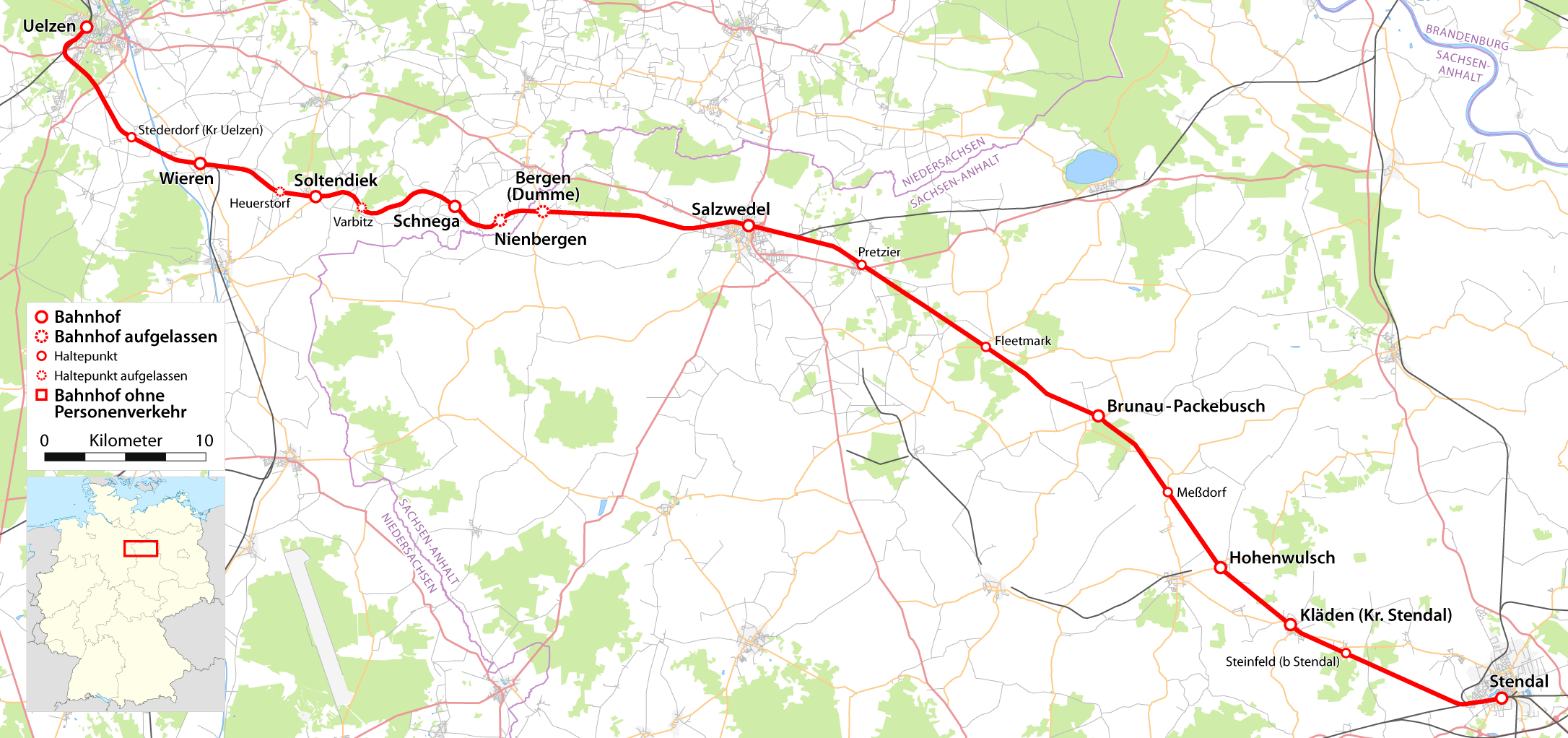
- The Uelzen–Stendal route

Overview
- Line number: 6899
- Locale: Saxony-Anhalt and Lower Saxony, Germany

Service
- Route number: 305

Technical
- Number of tracks: 2: Brunau-Packebusch to Rademin
- Track gauge: 1,435 mm (4 ft 8 1/2 in) standard gauge
- Electrification: 15 kV/16.7 Hz AC overhead catenary
- Operating speed: 160 km/h (99 mph) (maximum)

The Stendal–Uelzen railway is a mostly single-track, electrified main line and connects Stendal in the east of Altmark, Saxony-Anhalt with Uelzen in Lower Saxony. The most important stop along the way is Salzwedel.

== History ==
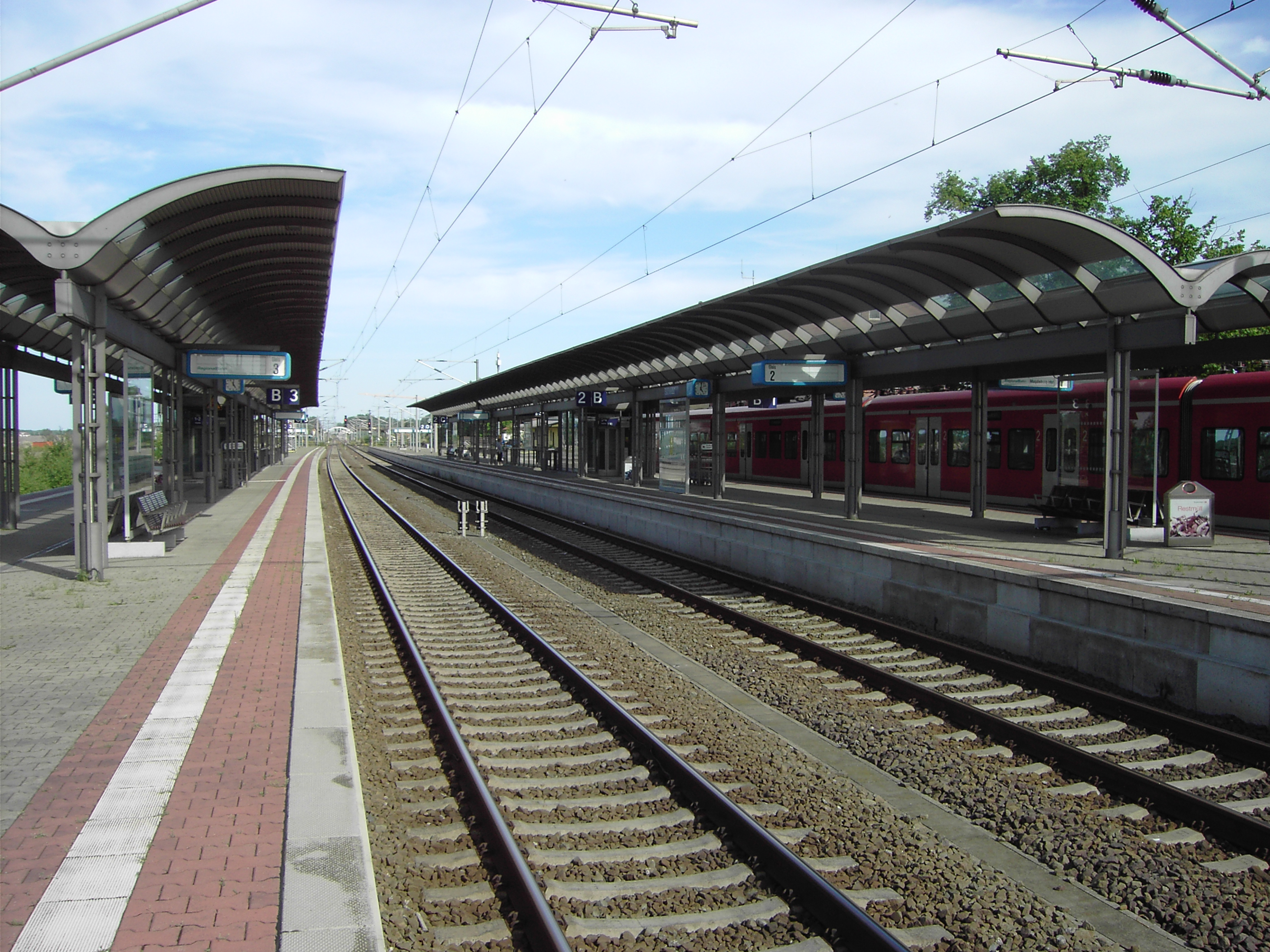
Renovated Salzwedel station

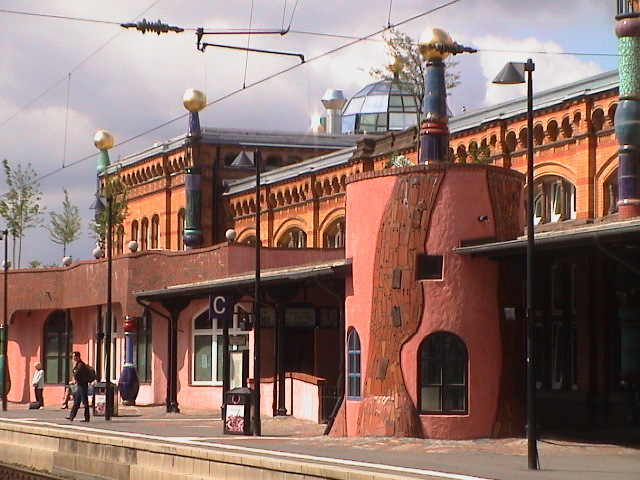
Uelzen station in Uelzen

The Stendal–Uelzen line was originally opened in 1873 as part of a direct connection from Berlin to the naval base at Wilhelmshaven by the Magdeburg–Halberstadt Railway Company (MHE) and was opened as part of the so-called America Line.

In 1945, the line was cut by the Inner German border. West of the border a temporary terminus was created at Nienbergen as the former station in the Lower Saxon town of Bergen an der Dumme was 1,200 meters east of the Iron Curtain. The second track was removed in two phases in 1946 and the 1980s: first, the section from Wieren to Nienbergen was singled, then the second track was also removed between Wieren and Uelzen.

In the Soviet Zone, which became East Germany in 1949, trains initially ran between Stendal and Bergen. Border security measures were imposed between Salzwedel and Bergen on 7 October 1951 as Bergen station was only 1,200 meters from the border. Between Stendal and Salzwedel one of the two tracks was dismantled because the track material was supposedly needed for the construction of the Berlin outer ring.

After the fall of the Berlin Wall in 1990, the rebuilding of the Stendal–Salzwedel–Uelzen connection was added to the list of German Unity Transport Projects (Verkehrsprojekte Deutsche Einheit). The old line was completely rebuilt and established in 1999 as a single-track, electrified mainline railway and restored to operation. Part of the second track was also restored. The whole project took several years to complete. The 17.5 km long section between Brunau and district road 1005 in Klein Gartz now has two tracks and there is also an approximately one kilometre long passing loop west of the former Kläden station; the current Kläden station is now located further to the east on a single-track section. In addition, during the implementation of the German Unity Transport Project, all loading sidings near the line were dismantled and connecting sidings were reduced so that local freight movements are no longer possible on this line. The originally planned complete reconstruction of the line as a two-track line has not yet been realised.

== Current situation ==
In the 2010/11 timetable, the Regional-Express service RE 20 runs between Uelzen and Stendal every two hours and the Regionalbahn service RB 32 runs every two hours between Salzwedel and Stendal. Both services are operated by DB Regio. The RE services are operated with double-deck coaches mostly hauled by class 114 locomotives and the RB services are partly operated with class 425 EMUs. On Friday, an Intercity service is operated from Hamburg via Lüneburg, Uelzen and Stendal to Berlin, returning on Sunday. Until 13 December 2014, a train pair operated daily as a EuroCity on the Hamburg–Berlin–Wrocław route. Since April 2014, an InterRegio-Express has been operating the route from Berlin and Hamburg. During disruptions to long-distance traffic between Hamburg and Berlin services often also detour over the line via Wittenberg.

As part of a program to upgrade links between seaports and the hinterland, a second track was built from December 2012 to November 2013 in the Uelzen district of Veerßen to the east of the Stendal–Uelzen line, so that traffic coming from the direction of Stendal could run to the north without crossing the Hanover–Hamburg line.

== Future ==
The existing two-track section for crossing and overhauling between Brunau-Packebusch and Rademin, which is around 17.5 kilometre long, is to be extended to the east and west. This applies to the sections between Hohenwulsch and Brunaupark-Packebusch and between Rademin and Salzwedel. This involves a total of 22 km of additional second track at an estimated cost of about €57 million. The reason given for the project is to increase the capacity for freight and to improve the performance of regional traffic. In July 2013, Deutsche Bahn put the project out to tender. The estimated value of the contract, including overhead electrification, is €22 million, which is to be carried out between June 2014 and March 2016.
