= Uelzen–Langwedel railway =

Railway line in Germany

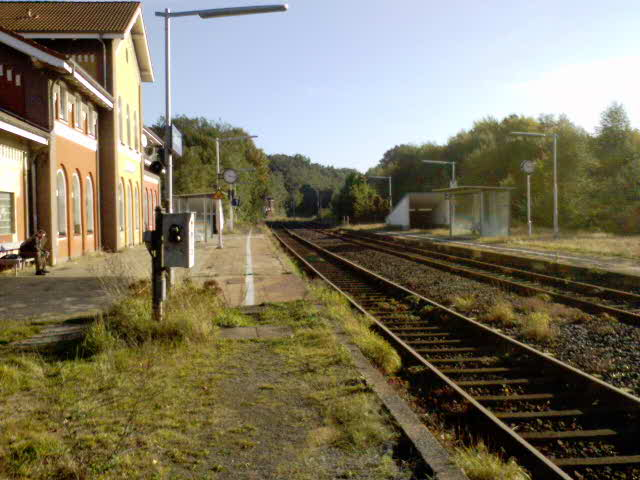
- Visselhövede station

Overview
- Line number: 1960

Service
- Route number: 116 (Uelzen–Bremen)

Technical
- Line length: 97.4 km (60.5 mi)
- Track gauge: 1,435 mm (4 ft 8 1/2 in) standard gauge
Route map
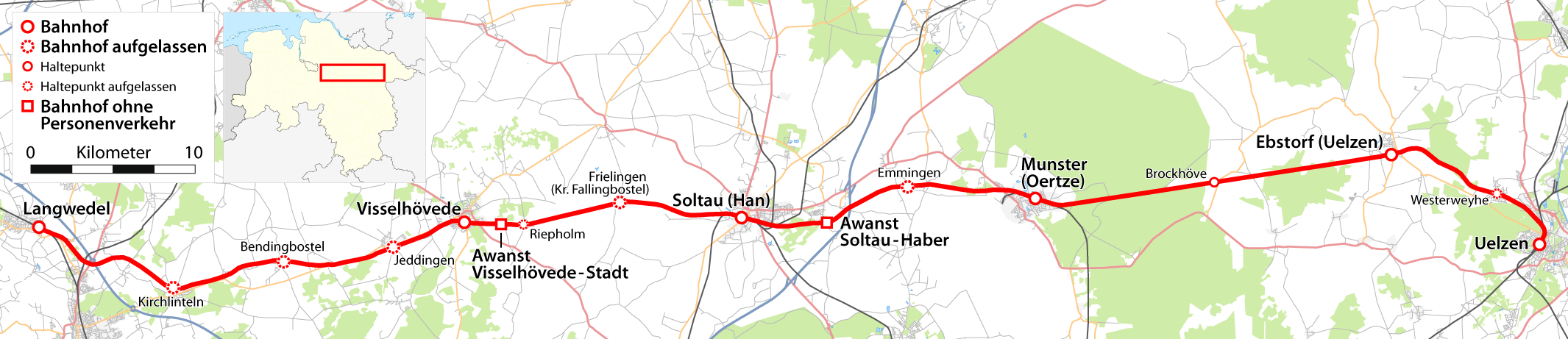
- Source: German railway atlas

The Uelzen–Langwedel railway runs through the Lüneburg Heath in north Germany in an east-west direction. The line became known as part of the so-called America Line.

== History ==
=== Imperial era ===
The Bremen State Railway, as it was first called, was originally built by the Bremen Senate and opened in 1873. It runs from Lower Saxon Langwedel eastwards through the Lüneburg Heath to Uelzen. The line was renowned as part of the so-called America Line. In Langwedel it formed a junction with the line to Wunstorf, that was owned 50/50 by Bremen and Hanover and operated by the Royal Hanoverian State Railways. Profits on the Langwedel–Uelzen section were initially split in a 2:1 ratio between the Magdeburg-Halberstadt Railway Company (MHE) and Bremen, until operations were taken over by Prussia. At the start of the 20th century the line entered the spotlight as the shortest link between Berlin and the naval base at Wilhelmshaven, which is why several barracks and military training areas were established at Munster (Örtze) and the line doubled in 1907.

=== 1918 to 1945 ===
Between the wars several express trains ran between Berlin and Wilhelmshaven or Norddeich over this line. In the Second World War the stations were repeatedly the targets of air raids. At the end of the 1930s there was a collision between a bus and Adolf Hitler's train at the level crossing near Walle which resulted in several fatalities. Today the level crossing has gone; in its place is an overbridge for the B 215. The so-called Führerzug ("Führer's train") continued on its way after a short stop at Kirchlinteln. In February 1945 a refugee train was destroyed during an air raid near the villages of Scharnhorst and Walle resulting in a high death toll. Towards the end the line was the scene of heavy fighting between retreating Wehrmacht troops and the advancing British Army.

=== Post-war period ===
After the Second World War the line through the Lüneburg Heath was reduced in stages to a single-track branch line by 1987 and several halts and stations were closed to passenger services. In addition many of the goods facilities were closed. In 1987 most of the manually operated level crossings were replaced by automatic barriers.

== Situation today ==
=== Physical condition ===
Even after the fall of the Berlin Wall the non-electrified line was of little importance within the Deutsche Bahn network and has had very little in the way of modernisation measures. As a result, between Langwedel and Uelzen there are many features of interest to railway fans such as old signal box installations, telegraph poles, semaphore signals and station buildings.

==== Renovation work ====
In early 2009 renovations to the permanent way were carried out between Langwedel and Soltau, something that had been repeatedly delayed since the 1990s. The Federal Railway Office (EBA) had set Deutsche Bahn a deadline after when it threatened to ban operations between Langwedel and Soltau. Consequently, train services in the 2008/2009 winter timetable were interrupted due to major work on the line and in Visselhövede station. These measures secured the continued existence of the line.

=== Passenger services ===
Up to December 2008 passenger services consisted of Regionalbahn trains run by DB Regio as part of the Uelzen-Bremen route, not all of which were operated to a fixed-interval system. Following the changeover of timetables in December 2008, RegionalBahn trains now only run between Uelzen and Langwedel; passengers have to change for Bremen. This service is justified on the grounds that a lot of construction work is taking place. The occasional trains between Brunswick and Bremen that ran over the Brunswick–Uelzen railway and Langwedel before December 2008 have also been dropped from the timetable.

The Osthannoversche Eisenbahnen AG (OHE) won the tender for the Heidekreuz (cross heath) services (Bremen–Uelzen and Buchholz–Hanover). The newly founded subsidiary Erixx took over operations from the timetable change in December 2011 for eight years. Except for a few exceptions during peak hours, services run on a two-hour cycle. There are no longer any commuter or school trains on the America Line, so the majority of travellers are occasional passengers.

=== Goods traffic ===
The low level of goods traffic, which comprises wood trains, transfers to the Visselhövede mineral oil dealer and container trains, was operated by the East Hanoverian Railways. From time to time vehicles from the Middle Weser Railway MWB run on the line. Since 2024 some gravel hauling trains with EGP Eisenbahn Gesellschaft Potsdam diesels and MKB Mindener Kreis-Bahn Dual-Mode engines are spotted.

== Future ==
The railway is seriously threatened with closure, mainly due to the lack of passenger numbers. Nevertheless, there are regular discussions about electrifying and upgrading the line for goods traffic, especially as a junction to the JadeWeserPort container port at Wilhelmshaven. In a 2004 federal railway upgrade law it was described as of "urgent necessity". In Kirchlinteln there are efforts being made to have a halt built for passengers. The demand is for a more central facility unlike the former station. In Visselhövede there are plans to close the present station and build another one further east nearer the town centre. There is also an intent to double the line between Tadel (between the old stations of Jeddingen and Bendingbostel) and Langwedel as part of the new wye section (Y-Trasse) on the Hanover–Bremen route for the high speed trains; but construction has been delayed several times and its future is uncertain.

== Rolling stock ==
Locomotives of DRG classes 03 and 50 used to be a common sight on the line. These were mainly stationed in Uelzen. The line was one of the longest in West Germany to be regularly worked by steam engines. In addition, immediately after the war Wittfelder accumulator cars could be seen on the line as well as steam-hauled trains. The Wittfelders were later replaced by Class 798 Uerdingen railbuses and prototype units of Class 628.0. In the 1980s and 1990s DB Class 216s, 624s, 218s and even occasional 212s were used in charge of Eilzug trains. Local passenger trains no longer run any more. In 2008 diesel multiple units of classes 628.2 and 628.4 were introduced. Until the timetable change in December 2008 DB Class 614 units were used. On 10 December 2005 the DB Class 634s were withdrawn. InterCity trains between Munster via Uelzen to Berlin, midday on Fridays for the weekend home travels of German Army soldiers and back to Munster late Sunday evenings were headed by 218s until 2012. Now this service is taken over by regular Alstom class 648.4 RDCs of DB Regio Start Niedersachsen-Mitte.

The wood and container trains were occasionally hauled by ADtranz DE-AC33C diesel locomotives with their Red Tiger livery, with locomotives of classes MaK G 1202 BB, MaK G 1204 BB or MaK G 1205 BB in charge of smaller transfer trains operated by the OHE. Now occasionally freights are run by DB BR 232, Mak G 1206 BB, BR 218s, whereas since 2023 some Siemens Dual Mode Vectrons are spotted with heavier trains.

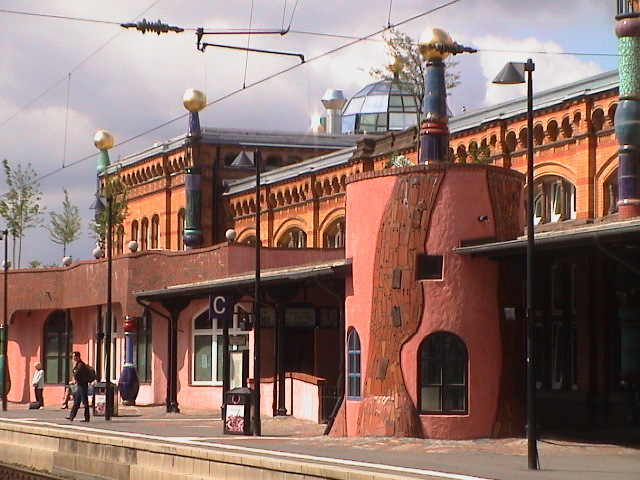
The Hundertwasser station in Uelzen

== See also ==
- List of scheduled railway routes in Germany
- Bremen State Railway
