= Magdeburg–Halberstadt Railway Company =

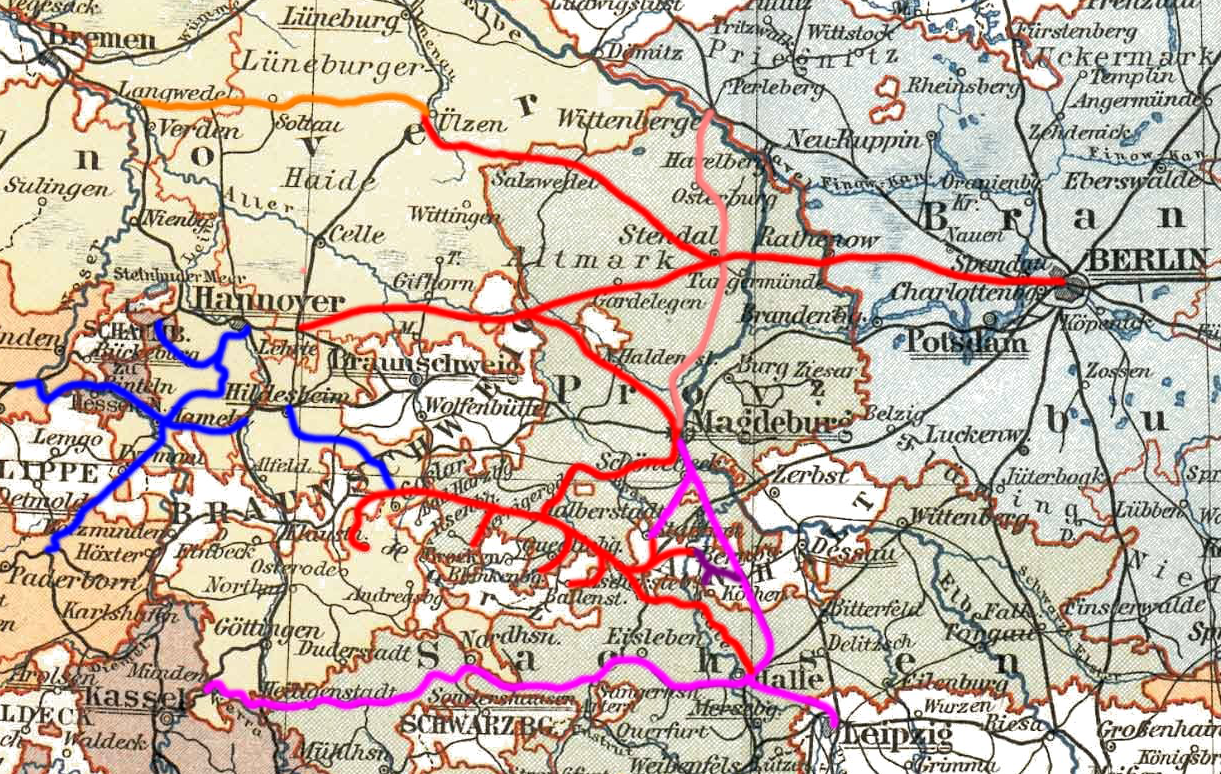
Rail network of the MHE in 1879 lines built and operated by the MHE Lines of the Magdeburg-Wittenberge Railway; taken over by the MHE in 1863 Lines of the Anhalt-Köthen-Bernburg Railway; taken over by the MHE in 1863 Lines of the Magdeburg-Leipzig Railway; taken over by the MHE in 1876 Operation of the MHE over the lines of the Hannover-Altenbeken Railway Operation of the MHE over the lines of the Bremen State Railway

The Magdeburg–Halberstadt Railway Company (German: Magdeburg-Halberstädter Eisenbahngesellschaft, MHE) was a railway in Prussia. It was nationalized in 1879.

== History ==
The Magdeburg-Halberstadt Railway Company received a concession on 14 January 1842 from the Prussian government to build the 58 km long railway line from Magdeburg–Oschersleben–Halberstadt line, which opened on 15 July 1843. Under a treaty between Prussia and the Kingdom of Hanover, it had already secured the right to continue the line to Brunswick and Hanover. The MHE was one of the most profitable German private railways, and two-digit dividends were the rule in the 1860s; it even paid dividends to its shareholders of over 20 percent at times.

The expansion phase of the railway began in 1863 when—at first as a defence against growing competition—it acquired the adjacent lines of the Magdeburg-Wittenberge Railway (Magdeburg-Wittenbergesche Eisenbahn). Critical to the competitiveness of the railway within Prussia was the connection from Berlin to Hamburg and Bremen. In 1867, it obtained the concession for the construction of a line from Berlin via Stendal to Lehrte, known as the Lehrter Bahn (Lehrte Railway). It completed the line on 1 December 1871, including the Lehrter Bahnhof (station) in Berlin. Acquisition of the Hanover-Altenbeken Railway Company (Hannover-Altenbekener Eisenbahn-Gesellschaft) gave the MHE access to the Westphalian line and thus to the Ruhr. With the purchase of more railways—including the highly profitable Magdeburg-Leipzig Railway—the line grew to a length of 1,024 kilometres in 1879. Thus the Magdeburg-Halberstadt Railway was at the time of its nationalization the largest private railway company in Germany.

In 1870, the MHE together with the Berlin-Potsdam-Magdeburg Railway Company and the Magdeburg-Leipzig Railway Company acquired 55-hectares of land for the construction of Magdeburg station. The western entrance building built by the Berlin-Potsdam-Magdeburg Railway was shared by the MHE.

In 1873, the MHE opened the Uelzen–Stendal section of the America Line, and assumed responsibility for the management of the whole line. The MHE acquired of the Magdeburg-Leipzig Railway Company on 17 March 1876.

In December 1879 the Magdeburg-Halberstadt Railway Company was acquired by the Prussian state after shareholders had approved the takeover bid with the necessary two-thirds majority (13,140 to 6,441 votes).

== See also ==
- Adolph von Hansemann, who directed the construction of the Berlin–Lehrte railway
