= America Line =

Unofficial name for German railway line

The America Line (German: Amerikalinie) is the official name of a railway line in northern Germany which is mainly of regional importance today. It runs in an east-west direction and links Stendal in Saxony-Anhalt with the Hanseatic city of Bremen.

== History ==
The America Line was originally the central element of direct links from Magdeburg and, most importantly, Berlin to the North Sea ports. It was given its colloquial name because many emigrants from East and West Prussia, Silesia and the provinces of Posen and Pomerania travelled on the line to Bremerhaven, where there was a connexion to emigration ships sailing to America at the "Old" and "New" Lloydhalle and Kaiserhafen and Nordenham Lloydpier until the WW1, later, since 1928, on the Columbus Quay (Columbuskaje). In the opposite direction, many goods trains laden with fresh fish ran from Bremerhaven to the capital of the German Reich. Because Kaiser Wilhelm II occasionally travelled on this route from Berlin to the naval bases on the North Sea, it is sometimes also called the Emperor Line (Kaiserlinie). Several express trains ran on this line on the route from Berlin–Wilhelmshaven to Berlin–Norddeich. During the Cold War, the line was cut next to Nienbergen station as a result of the creation of the Inner German border.

== Operation ==
The Lower Saxon town of Uelzen is the historical and geographical centre point of the route, and the point at which it is divided from an operational and timetable point of view. The eastern section of the route is now electrified and upgraded, whereas the western section is mostly non-electrified and also known as the Uelzen Railway (Uelzener Bahn).

== Route ==
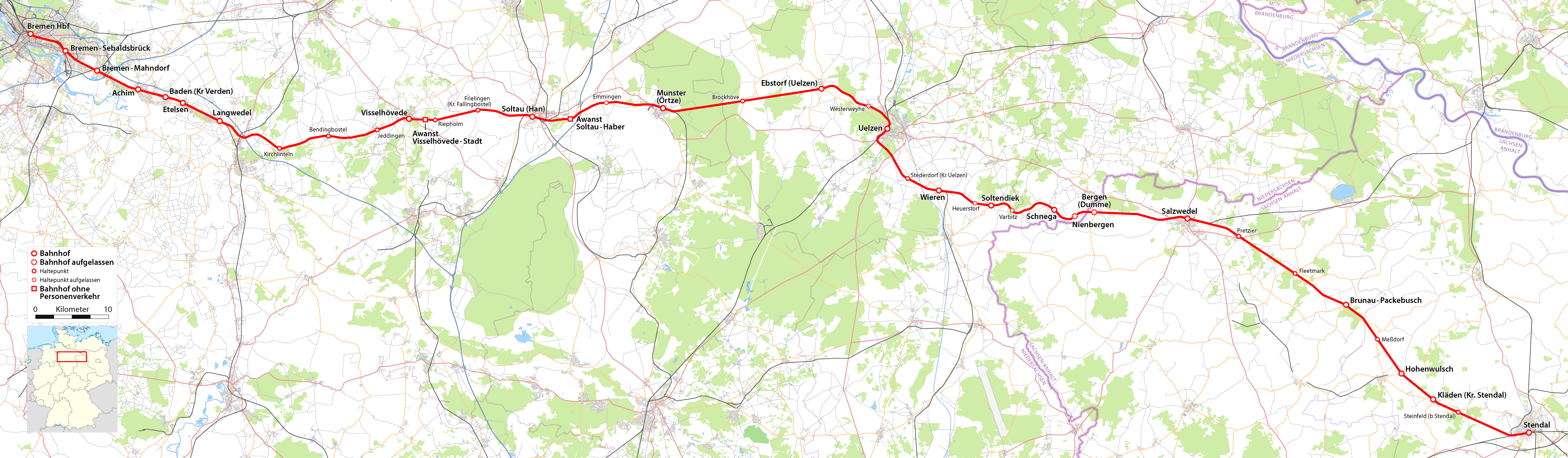
Route of the America Line

For information on the two halves of the route see: Stendal–Uelzen railway and Uelzen–Langwedel railway.

== See also ==
- List of scheduled railway routes in Germany
- Prussian state railways

== Literature ==
- Ralf Roman Rossberg: Grenze über deutschen Schienen 1945-1990. 2. Auflage, EK-Verlag, Freiburg 1991, ISBN 3-88255-829-6
