= List of railway routes in Lower Saxony and Bremen =

The List of railway routes in Lower Saxony provides a list of all regional routes in Lower Saxony, northern Germany. The information is up to date to December 2022.

== Regional services ==
- Lines or sections with a frequency of less than 60 minutes from Monday to Friday, mostly every 30 minutes, are shown in bold.
- Lines or sections with a frequency of more than 60 minutes from Monday to Friday, mostly every 120 minutes, are shown in italics.
- Lines or sections outside of Lower Saxony are shown smaller.
- Lines or sections that cannot be used with local transport tickets are crossed out.

Line	Subnet	Route	KBS	Operator	Material
RE 1	Expresskreuz Niedersachsen/Bremen	Hannover – Nienburg (Weser) – Verden (Aller) – Bremen – Oldenburg (Oldb) – Leer (Ostfriesl) – Emden – Norddeich Mole	(380, 390,) 395	DB Regio Nord	Traxx P160 AC1 (146.1/146.2) + 7 double deck stock
RE 1	Neigetechnik-Netz Thüringen	Göttingen – Leinefelde – Gotha – Erfurt – Gera – Glauchau	540.1	DB Regio Südost	1–3 × class 612
RE 2	Hanse-Netz	Uelzen – Celle – Hannover – Sarstedt – Kreiensen – Northeim (Han) – Göttingen	110, 350	metronom	Traxx P160 AC1 (146.1/146.2) + 6 double deck stock
RE 2	Dieselnetz Nordthüringen	Kassel-Wilhelmshöhe – Hann. Münden – Leinefelde – Bad Langensalza – Erfurt	603, 611	DB Regio Südost	1 × Siemens Desiro Classic (642)
RE 2	Rhein-Haard-Express	Osnabrück – Hasbergen – Lengerich – Münster – Recklinghausen – Essen – Duisburg – Düsseldorf	(385,) 425.Reg.	DB Regio NRW	Traxx P160 AC1 (146.1) + 5 double deck stock
RE 3	Hanse-Netz	Hamburg – Lüneburg – Uelzen – Celle – Hannover	110	metronom	Traxx P160 AC1 (146.1/146.2) + 7 double deck stock
RE 4	Hanse-Netz	Hamburg – Buchholz – Tostedt – Rotenburg (Wümme) – Bremen	120	metronom	Traxx P160 AC1 (146.1/146.2) + 7 double deck stock
RE 4	Dieselnetz Sachsen-Anhalt	Goslar – Vienenburg – Wernigerode – Halberstadt – Aschersleben – Halle (Saale)	330	Abellio Rail Mitteldeutschland	LINT 41 (1648)
RE 5	Unterelbe	Hamburg – Buxtehude – Stade – Cuxhaven	121	DB Regio Nord	Traxx P160 DE (246) + 5 double deck stock
RE 6	Dieselnetz Sachsen-Anhalt	Wolfsburg – Oebisfelde – Haldensleben – Magdeburg	308	Abellio Rail Mitteldeutschland	LINT 41 (1648)
RE 8	Expresskreuz Niedersachsen/Bremen	Bremerhaven-Lehe – Bremerhaven – Osterholz-Scharmbeck – Bremen – Verden (Aller) – Nienburg (Weser) – Hannover	125, (380)	DB Regio Nord	Traxx P160 AC1 (146.1/146.2) + 6 double deck stock
RE 9	Expresskreuz Niedersachsen/Bremen	Bremerhaven-Lehe – Bremerhaven – Osterholz-Scharmbeck – Bremen – Diepholz – Osnabrück	125, (385)	DB Regio Nord	Traxx P160 AC1 (146.1/146.2) + 5 double deck stock
RE 9	Saale-Thüringen-Südharz	Kassel-Wilhelmshöhe – Hann. Münden – Leinefelde – Nordhausen – Sangerhausen – Halle (Saale)	590	Abellio Rail Mitteldeutschland	1–2 × Talent 2 (442)
RE 10	Dieselnetz-Niedersachsen-Südost	Bad Harzburg – Goslar – Salzgitter-Ringelheim – Hildesheim – Sarstedt – Hannover	320	Erixx	1–3 × LINT 54 (622)
RE 15	Expresslinien Emsland/Mittelland	Emden Außenhafen – Leer (Ostfriesl) – Meppen – Lingen (Ems) – Rheine – Münster (Westf)	395, (410)	Westfalenbahn	1–2 × Flirt 3 (1428)
RE 18	Weser-Ems-Netz	Wilhelmshaven – Oldenburg (Oldb) – Cloppenburg – Bramsche – Osnabrück	392	NordWestBahn	1–3 × LINT 41 (648/1648)
RE 20	Elektronetz Sachsen-Anhalt Nord	Uelzen – Salzwedel – Hohenwulsch – Stendal – Tangerhütte – Magdeburg	305	DB Regio Südost	Bombardier Traxx+ 3 double deck stock class 425 (one rotation in the morning)
RE 21	Dieselnetz Sachsen-Anhalt	Goslar – Vienenburg – Wernigerode – Halberstadt – Oschersleben (Bode) – Magdeburg	330	Abellio Rail Mitteldeutschland	LINT 41 (1648)
RE 30	Elektro-Netz Niedersachsen-Ost	Wolfsburg – Gifhorn – Lehrte – Hannover	300	metronom	1–2 × Alstom Coradia Continental (1440)
RB 31	Hanse-Netz	Hamburg – Maschen – Lüneburg	110	metronom	Traxx P160 AC1 (146.1/146.2) + 6 double deck stock
RB 32	Dieselnetz-Niedersachsen-Südost	Lüneburg – Dahlenburg – Dannenberg Ost	112	Erixx	1 × LINT 54 (622)
	Weser-Elbe-Netz	Buxtehude – Bremervörde – Bremerhaven – Dorum – Cuxhaven	122, 125	EVB	LINT 41 (648), iLINT 54 (654)
IC 34	Intercity	Leer (Ostfriesl) – Emden – Norddeich Mole	395	DB Fernverkehr	
IC 35	Intercity	Leer (Ostfriesl) – Emden – Norddeich Mole or Emden Außenhafen	395, 396	DB Fernverkehr	class 101 + Intercity coaches Intercity 2
RB 35	Dieselnetz Sachsen-Anhalt	Wolfsburg – Oebisfelde – Gardelegen – Stendal	301	Abellio Rail Mitteldeutschland	1–2 × LINT 41 (1648)
RB 36	Dieselnetz Sachsen-Anhalt	Wolfsburg – Oebisfelde – Wegenstedt – Haldensleben – Barleben – Magdeburg	308	Abellio Rail Mitteldeutschland	1 × LINT 41 (1648)
RB 37	Dieselnetz Niedersachsen-Mitte	Bremen – Langwedel – Soltau – Uelzen	116	DB Regio Nord	1–2 × LINT 41 (648)
RB 38	Dieselnetz Niedersachsen-Mitte	(Hamburg-Harburg) – Buchholz (Nordheide) – Soltau – Walsrode – Hannover	123	DB Regio Nord	1–3 × LINT 41 (648)
RB 40	Elektronetz Nord	Braunschweig – Helmstedt – Eilsleben – Magdeburg – Burg	310	DB Regio Südost	Bombardier Traxx+ 3 double deck stock 2 × LINT 27/41 (640/648) (Braunschweig–Helmstedt in the peak)
RB 41	Hanse-Netz	Hamburg – Buchholz – Tostedt – Rotenburg (Wümme) – Bremen	120	metronom	Traxx P160 AC1 (146.1/146.2) + 5 double deck stock
RB 42	Dieselnetz-Niedersachsen-Südost	Braunschweig – Wolfenbüttel – Vienenburg – Bad Harzburg (Braunschweig – Vienenburg coupled with RB43)	353	Erixx	1 × LINT 54 (622)
RB 43	Dieselnetz-Niedersachsen-Südost	Braunschweig – Wolfenbüttel – Vienenburg – Goslar (Braunschweig – Vienenburg coupled with RB42)	353	Erixx	1 × LINT 54 (622)
RB 44	Dieselnetz-Niedersachsen-Südost	Braunschweig – Salzgitter-Immendorf – Salzgitter-Lebenstedt	(352)	DB Regio Nord	2 × LINT 27 (640), 1 × LINT 41 (648)
RB 45	Dieselnetz-Niedersachsen-Südost	Braunschweig – Wolfenbüttel – Schöppenstedt	(312)	DB Regio Nord	1–2 × LINT 41 (648)
RB 46	Dieselnetz-Niedersachsen-Südost	Braunschweig – Seesen – Herzberg (Harz)	(358)	DB Regio Nord	1–2 × LINT 41 (648)
RB 47	Dieselnetz-Niedersachsen-Südost	Braunschweig – Gifhorn – Wittingen – Uelzen	115	Erixx	1–2 × LINT 54 (622)
RB 48	Dieselnetz-Niedersachsen-Südost	Braunschweig – Salzgitter-Lebenstedt	(352)	DB Regio Nord	2 × LINT 27 (640), 1 × LINT 41 (648)
RE 50	Elektro-Netz Niedersachsen-Ost	Wolfsburg – Braunschweig – Hildesheim	313	metronom	1–2 × Alstom Coradia Continental (1440)
IC 56	Intercity	Bremen – Oldenburg (Oldb) – Leer (Ostfriesl) – Emden – Norddeich Mole	(390)	DB Fernverkehr	Intercity 2
RB 56		Bad Bentheim – Nordhorn – Neuenhaus	376	Bentheimer Eisenbahn	1 × LINT 41 (1648)
(RB 57)	Noordelijke Nevenlijnen	(Leer – ) Weener – Nieuweschans – Groningen	397	Arriva PLC	1 × GTW 2/6; 1 × GTW 2/8
RB 58	Weser-Ems-Netz	Osnabrück – Bramsche – Vechta – Delmenhorst – Bremen	394	NordWestBahn	1–3 × LINT 41 (648/1648)
RB 59	Weser-Ems-Netz	Wilhelmshaven – Sande – Jever – Wittmund – Esens	393	NordWestBahn	1–3 × LINT 41 (648/1648)
RE 60	Elektronetz Mittelland	Braunschweig – Peine – Hannover – Minden (Westf) – Melle – Osnabrück – Rheine	370, 375	Westfalenbahn	1 × Stadler KISS (445)
RB 61	Teutoburger-Wald-Netz	Bielefeld – Herford – Bünde – Osnabrück – Rheine – Bad Bentheim – Hengelo (NL)	370, 375, (386)	Eurobahn	1 × Flirt 3 (2429)
RE 62		Rheine – Ibbenbüren – Osnabrück – Melle – Kirchlengern – Löhne	370, 375	DB Regio Nord	1 × Alstom Coradia Continental (1440)
RB 66	Teutoburger-Wald-Netz	Osnabrück – Hasbergen – Lengerich – Münster (Westf)	(385)	Eurobahn	1 × Flirt (427/429)
RE 70	Elektronetz Mittelland	**Braunschweig – Peine – Hannover** – Minden (Westf) – Herford – Bielefeld	370	Westfalenbahn	1 × Stadler KISS (445)
RB 75	OWL-Dieselnetz	Osnabrück – Dissen-Bad Rothenfelde – **Halle (Westf) – Bielefeld**	402	NordWestBahn	1–2 × Bombardier Talent (643)
RB 77	Dieselnetz Niedersachsen-Mitte	Hildesheim – Hameln – Löhne – Bünde (-Herford)	372	DB Regio Nord	1–2 × LINT 41 (648)
RE 78	Teutoburger-Wald-Netz	Nienburg (Weser) – Minden (Westf) – Herford – Bielefeld	124, 370	Eurobahn	Flirt (427/428/429); Flirt 3 (2429)
RB 79	Dieselnetz Niedersachsen-Mitte	Hildesheim – Bodenburg	373	DB Regio Nord	1–2 × LINT 41 (648)
RB 80	Dieselnetz-Niedersachsen-Südost	Göttingen – Northeim – Herzberg (Harz) – Nordhausen	(357)	DB Regio Nord	1–2 × LINT 41 (648)
RB 81	Dieselnetz-Niedersachsen-Südost	Bodenfelde – Northeim – Herzberg (Harz) – Nordhausen	(356, 357)	DB Regio Nord	1–2 × LINT 41 (648)
RB 82	Dieselnetz-Niedersachsen-Südost	Göttingen – Northeim – Kreiensen – Seesen – Goslar – Bad Harzburg	350, (354)	DB Regio Nord	1–2 × LINT 41 (648)
RE 83	Netz Ost	Lüneburg – Büchen – Lübeck – Kiel	(145)	Erixx	1–2 × LINT 41 (648)
RB 83	Nordost-Hessen-Netz	Göttingen – Eichenberg – Hann. Münden – Kassel	611	Cantus	1 × Flirt (427/428)
RB 84	OWL-Dieselnetz	Kreiensen – Holzminden – Höxter – Ottbergen – Paderborn	(355)	NordWestBahn	1–2 × Talent (643)
RB 85	OWL-Dieselnetz	Göttingen – Bodenfelde – Ottbergen – Paderborn	355	NordWestBahn	1 × Talent (643)
RB 86	Dieselnetz-Niedersachsen-Südost	(Göttingen – Northeim –) Einbeck-Salzderhelden – Einbeck Mitte	350, (351)	DB Regio Nord	1 × LINT 27 (640)
RB 87	Nordost-Hessen-Netz	Göttingen – Eichenberg – Eschwege – Bebra	613	Cantus	1 × Flirt (427/428)

== S-Bahn services ==
=== S-Bahn Hannover ===
Line	Route	KBS	Frequency	Material
S 1	Minden - Bückeburg - Kirchhorsten - Stadthagen - Lindhorst - Haste (Han) - Wunstorf - Dedensen-Gümmer - Seelze - Letter - Hannover-Leinhausen - Hannover-Nordstadt - Hannover Hbf - Hannover Bismarckstraße - Hannover-Linden/Fischerhof - Hannover-Bornum - Empelde - Ronnenberg - Weetzen - Lemmie - Wennigsen - Egestorf - Kirchdorf - Barsinghausen - Winninghausen - Bantorf - Bad Nenndorf - Haste (Han)	360.1	60 mins	DB Class 424, DB Class 425
S 2	Nienburg - Linsburg - Hagen (Han) - Eilvese - Neustadt am Rübenberge - Poggenhagen - Wunstorf - Dedensen-Gümmer - Seelze - Letter - Hannover-Leinhausen - Hannover-Nordstadt - Hannover Hbf - Hannover Bismarckstraße - Hannover-Linden/Fischerhof - Hannover-Bornum - Empelde - Ronnenberg - Weetzen - Lemmie - Wennigsen - Egestorf - Kirchdorf - Barsinghausen - Winninghausen - Bantorf - Bad Nenndorf - Haste (Han)	360.2	60 mins	DB Class 424, DB Class 425
S 3	Hannover Hbf - Hannover-Kleefeld - Hannover Karl-Wiechert-Allee - Hannover-Anderten-Misburg - Ahlten - Lehrte - Sehnde - Algermissen - Harsum - Hildesheim Hbf	360.3	60 mins	DB Class 424, DB Class 425
S 4	Bennemühlen - Mellendorf - Bissendorf - Langenhagen-Kaltenweide - Langenhagen Pferdemarkt - Langenhagen Mitte - Hannover-Vinnhorst - Hannover-Ledeburg - Hannover-Nordstadt - Hannover Hbf - Hannover Bismarckstraße - Hannover Messe/Laatzen - Rheten - Sarstedt - Barnten - Emmerke - Hildesheim Hbf	360.4	30 mins (Bennemühlen-Hannover)/60 mins (Bennemühlen-Hildesheim)	DB Class 424, DB Class 425
S 5	Hannover Flughafen - Langenhagen Pferdemarkt - Langenhagen Mitte - Hannover-Vinnhorst - Hannover-Ledeburg - Hannover-Nordstadt - Hannover Hbf - Hannover Bismarckstraße - Hannover-Linden/Fischerhof - Weetzen - Holtensen/Linderte - Bennigsen - Völksen/Eldagsen - Springe - Bad Münder - Hameln - Emmerthal - Bad Pyrmont - Lügde - Schieder - Steinheim - Altenbeken - Paderborn Hbf	360.5	30 mins (Hannover Airport-Paderborn)/60 mins Hannover Airport-Hameln	DB Class 424, DB Class 425
S 6	Hannover Hbf - Hannover Karl-Wiechert-Allee - Aligse - Burgdorf - Otze - Ehlershausen - Celle	360.6.7	60 mins	DB Class 424, DB Class 425
S 7	Hannover Hbf - Hannover-Kleefeld - Hannover Karl-Wiechert-Allee - Hannover-Anderten-Misburg - Ahlten - Lehrte - Aligse - Burgdorf - Otze - Ehlershausen - Celle	360.6.7	60 mins	DB Class 424, DB Class 425
S 8	Hannover Flughafen - Langenhagen Mitte - Hannover-Nordstadt - Hannover Hbf - Hannover Bismarckstraße - Hannover Messe/Laatzen	Hannover–Hamburg; Hanoverian Southern Railway	As required for Fair traffic	DB Class 424, DB Class 425
S 21	Hannover Hbf - Hannover Bismarckstraße - Hannover-Linden/Fischerhof - Empelde - Weetzen - Wennigsen - Barsinghausen	360.2	60 mins (peak hours only)	DB Class 424, DB Class 425
S 51	Seelze - Letter - Hannover Hbf - Hannover Bismarckstraße - Hannover-Linden/Fischerhof - Springe - Hameln	360.5	60 mins (peak hours only)	DB Class 424, DB Class 425

=== Regio-S-Bahn Bremen/Niedersachsen ===
Line	Route	Frequency	
Line	Route	Peak	Off-peak
RS1	Bremen-Farge–Bremen-Vegesack	30'	30'
RS1	Bremen-Vegesack–Bremen Hbf	15'	30'
RS1	Bremen Hbf–Verden	30'	60'
RS2	Bremerhaven-Lehe–Bremerhaven Hbf–Bremen Hbf–Twistringen	60'	60'
RS3	Bremen Hbf–Oldenburg Hauptbahnhof–(Bad Zwischenahn)	60'	60'
RS30	Bremen Hbf – Hude – Oldenburg (Oldb) – Bad Zwischenahn	60'	-
RS4	Bremen Hbf–Nordenham	60'	60'
RS6	Verden (Aller) – Rotenburg (Wümme)	60'	120'

== See also ==
- List of scheduled railway routes in Germany
