= Dörverden station =

Railway station in Dörverden, Germany

Dörverden
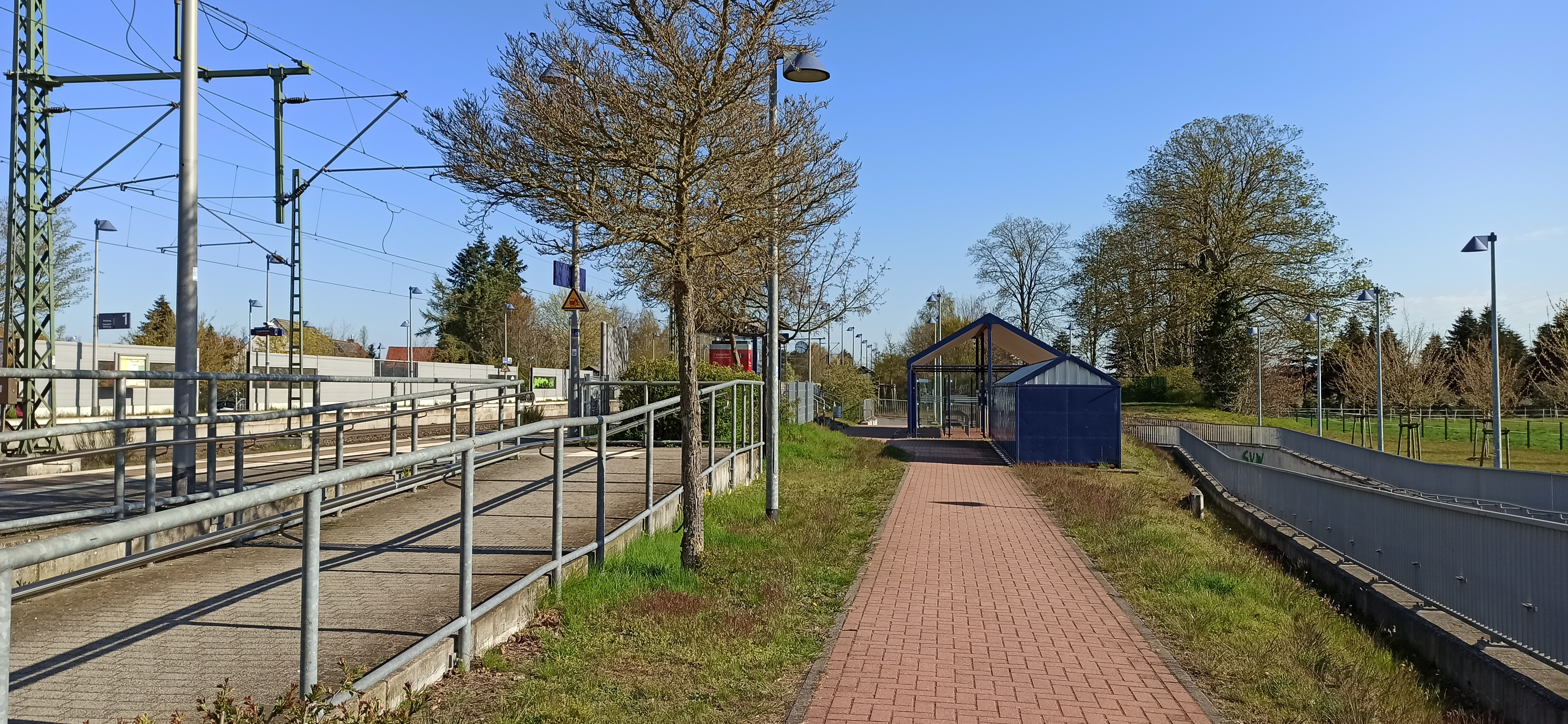
- Dörverden railway station

General information
- Location: Dörverden, Lower Saxony; Germany
- Coordinates: 52.5046°N 9.1447°E
- Line: Bremen–Hanover railway
- Platforms: 2

Other information
- Fare zone: VBN: 140
Location

Dörverden (German: Bahnhof Dörverden) is a railway station located in Dörverden, Germany. The station is located on the Bremen–Hanover railway. The train services are operated by Deutsche Bahn.

== Train services ==
The following services currently call at the station:

- Regional services RE 1 Norddeich - Emden - Oldenburg - Bremen - Nienburg - Hanover
- Regional services RE 8 Bremerhaven-Lehe - Bremen - Nienburg - Hanover

Preceding station	DB Regio Nord	Following station
Verden (Aller) towards Norddeich Mole	RE 1	Eystrup towards Hannover Hbf
Verden (Aller) towards Bremerhaven-Lehe	RE 8	Eystrup towards Hannover Hbf
