= Eystrup station =

Railway station in Eystrup, Germany

Eystrup
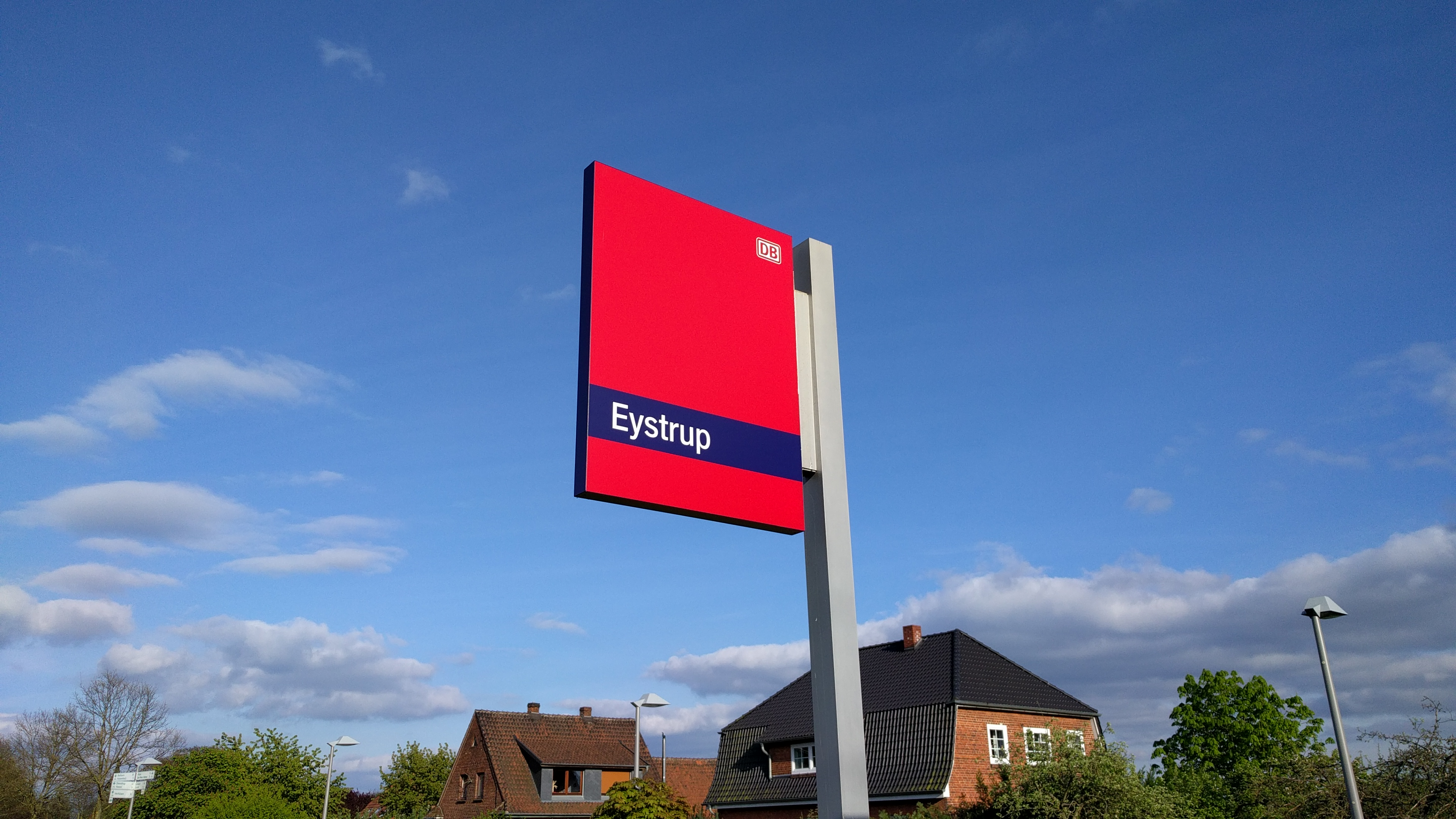
- Eystrup railway station

General information
- Location: Eystrup, Lower Saxony; Germany
- Coordinates: 52°46′59″N 9°13′53″E
- Lines: Wunstorf–Bremen railway line; Eystrup–Syke railway line
- Distance: 71.0 kilometres (44.1 mi) from Hannover; 7.8 kilometres (4.8 mi) from Hoya

Other information
- Fare zone: VLN: 5 (buses only); GVH: F (VLN transitional tariff, monthly passes only); VBN: 150 (VLN transitional tariff)
- Website: www.bahnhof.de

Services
Preceding station	DB Regio Nord	Following station
Dörverden towards Norddeich Mole	RE 1	Nienburg towards Hannover Hbf
Dörverden towards Bremerhaven-Lehe	RE 8	Nienburg towards Hannover Hbf
Location
- Location within Lower Saxony

Eystrup railway station (German: Bahnhof Eystrup) is a railway station located in Eystrup, Germany. The station is located on the Wunstorf–Bremen railway line; the Eystrup–Syke railway line terminates here. The train services are operated by Deutsche Bahn.

== Train services ==
The following services currently call at the station:

- Regional services RE 1 Norddeich - Emden - Oldenburg - Bremen - Nienburg - Hanover
- Regional services RE 8 Bremerhaven-Lehe - Bremen - Nienburg - Hanover
