= Bremen-Mahndorf station =

Railway station in Hemelingen, Bremen, Germany

Bremen Mahndorf
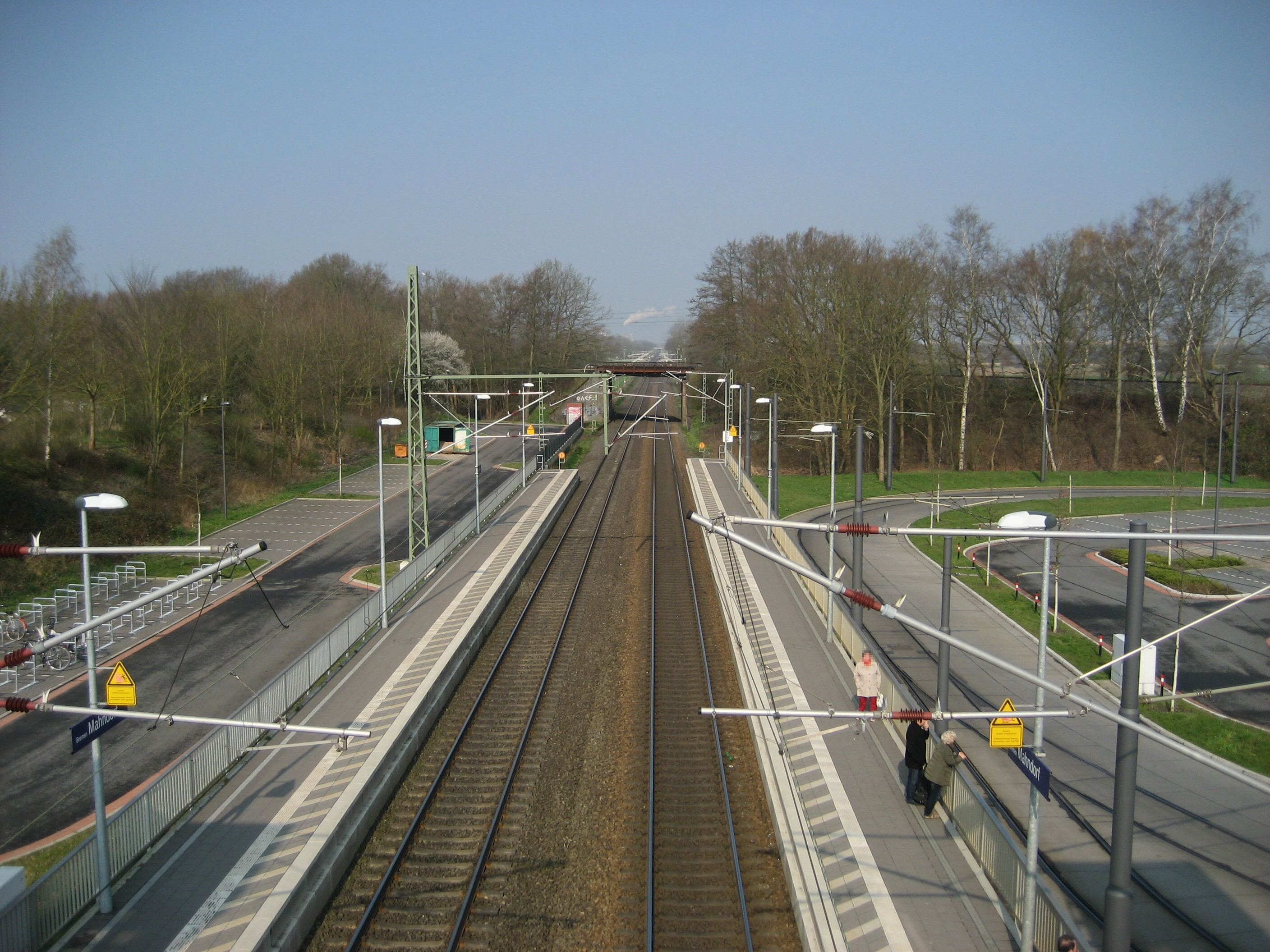
- 2016

General information
- Location: Bremen, Bremen; Germany
- Coordinates: 53.0219°N 8.5650°E
- Line: Bremen–Hanover railway
- Platforms: 2

Other information
- Fare zone: VBN: 100

Services
Preceding station	DB Regio Nord	Following station
Bremen Hbf towards Norddeich Mole	RE 1	Achim towards Hannover Hbf
Bremen Hbf towards Bremerhaven-Lehe	RE 8	Achim towards Hannover Hbf
Preceding station	Start	Following station
Bremen Hbf Terminus	RB 37	Achim towards Uelzen
Preceding station	Bremen S-Bahn	Following station
Bremen-Sebaldsbrück towards Bremen-Farge	RS1	Achim towards Verden (Aller)
Location

Bremen-Mahndorf (German: Bahnhof Bremen-Mahndorf) is a railway station located in the Mahndorf area of Bremen, Germany. The station is located on the Bremen–Hanover railway. The train services are operated by Deutsche Bahn and NordWestBahn. The station has been part of the Bremen S-Bahn since December 2010.

== Train services ==
The following services currently call at the station:

- Regional services RE 1 Norddeich - Emden - Oldenburg - Bremen - Nienburg - Hanover
- Regional services RE 8 Bremerhaven-Lehe - Bremen - Nienburg - Hanover
- Bremen S-Bahn services RS1 Bremen-Farge - Bremen-Vegesack - Bremen - Verden
