= Achim station =

Railway station in Achim, Germany

Achim
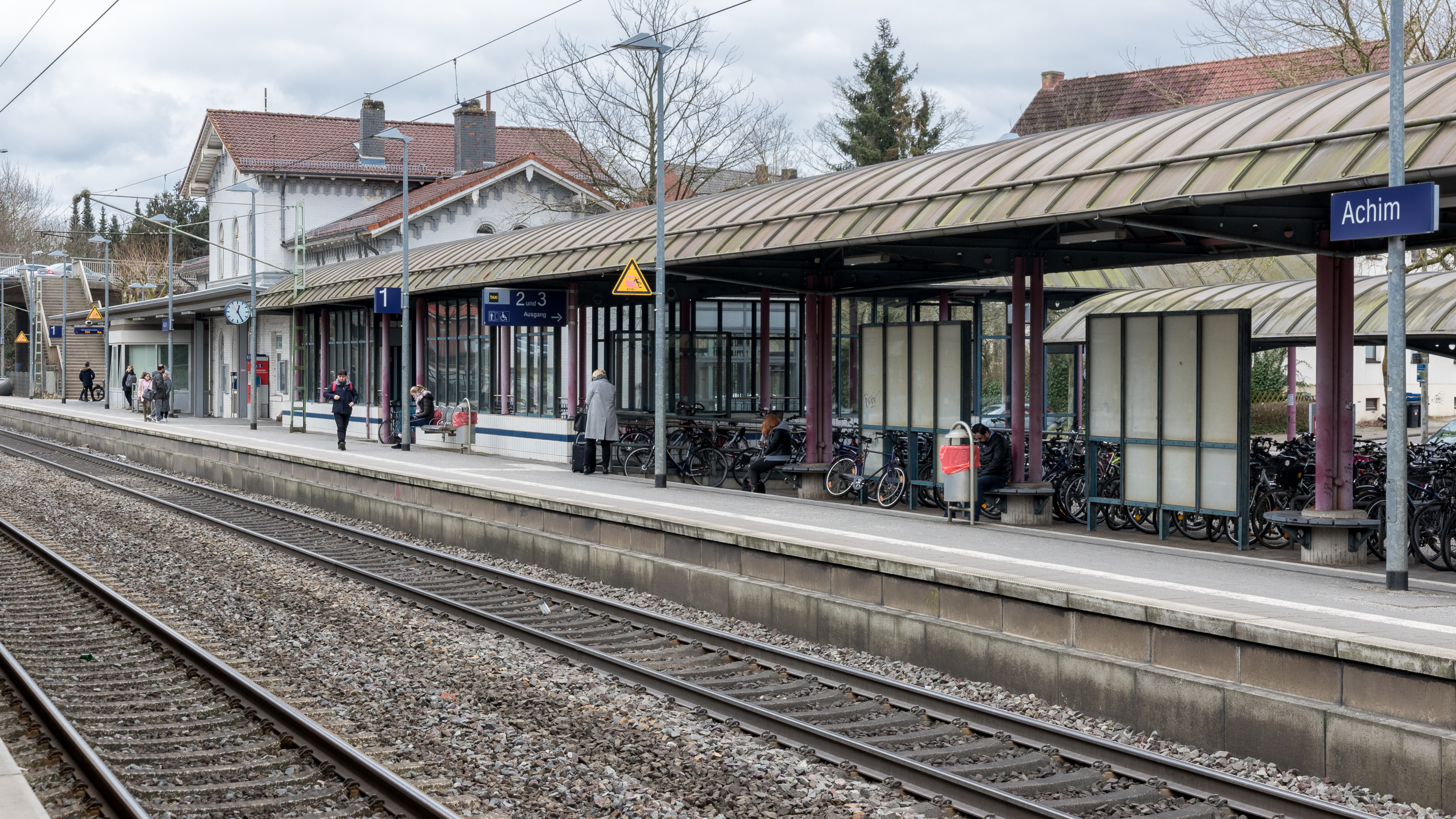
- Achim railway station

General information
- Location: Achim, Lower Saxony; Germany
- Coordinates: 53.0057°N 9.0150°E
- Line: Bremen–Hanover railway
- Platforms: 3

Other information
- Fare zone: VBN: 110

Services
Preceding station	DB Regio Nord	Following station
Bremen-Mahndorf towards Norddeich Mole	RE 1	Verden (Aller) towards Hannover Hbf
Bremen-Mahndorf towards Bremerhaven-Lehe	RE 8	Verden (Aller) towards Hannover Hbf
Preceding station	Start	Following station
Bremen-Mahndorf towards Bremen Hbf	RB 37	Langwedel towards Uelzen
Preceding station	Bremen S-Bahn	Following station
Bremen-Mahndorf towards Bremen-Farge	RS1	Baden (Verden) towards Verden (Aller)
Location

Achim (German: Bahnhof Achim) is a railway station located in Achim, Germany. The station is located on the Bremen–Hanover railway. The train services are operated by Deutsche Bahn, Erixx and NordWestBahn. The station has been part of the Bremen S-Bahn since December 2010.

== Train services ==
The following services currently call at the station:

- Regional services RE 1 Norddeich - Emden - Oldenburg - Bremen - Nienburg - Hanover
- Regional services RE 8 Bremerhaven-Lehe - Bremen - Nienburg - Hanover
- Local services RB 37 Bremen - Soltau - Uelzen
- Bremen S-Bahn services RS1 Bremen-Farge - Bremen-Vegesack - Bremen - Verden
