= Neustadt am Rübenberge station =

Railway station in Neustadt am Rübenberge, Germany

Neustadt a Rübenberge
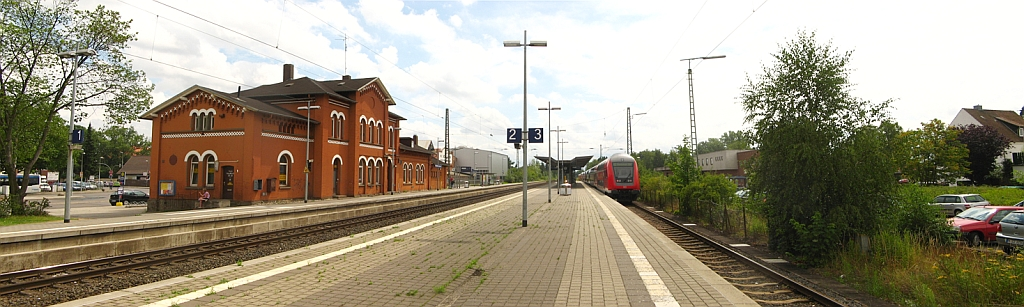
- Neustadt am Rübenberge railway station

General information
- Location: Neustadt am Rübenberge, Lower Saxony; Germany
- Coordinates: 52°30′11″N 9°27′18″E
- Lines: Wunstorf–Bremen (KBS 380)
- Distance: 31.0 km (19.3 mi) from Hannover
- Platforms: 1 side platform; 1 island platform
- Tracks: 3
- Train operators: DB Regio Nord; Transdev Hannover

Other information
- Station code: 4455
- DS100 code: HNRU
- IBNR: 8004322
- Category: 4
- Fare zone: C (Üstra)
- Website: www.bahnhof.de/neustadt-a-ruebenberge

Services
Preceding station	DB Regio Nord	Following station
Nienburg (Weser) towards Norddeich Mole	RE 1	Wunstorf towards Hannover Hbf
Nienburg (Weser) towards Bremerhaven-Lehe	RE 8	Wunstorf towards Hannover Hbf
Preceding station	Hanover S-Bahn	Following station
Eilvese towards Nienburg (Weser)	S 2	Poggenhagen towards Haste (Han)
Location
- Location within Lower Saxony

Neustadt am Rübenberge station (German: Bahnhof Neustadt am Rübenberge) is a railway station located in Neustadt am Rübenberge, Germany. The station is located on the Wunstorf–Bremen railway line. The train services are operated by DB Regio Nord and Transdev Hannover.

== Services ==
As of the April 2025 timetable change, the following services stop at Neustadt am Rübenberge:

- RE 1 / RE 8: hourly service between Nienburg (Weser) and Hannover; service every two hours to Norddeich Mole and Bremen.
- S 2: hourly service between Nienburg (Weser) and Haste (Han)
