= Wunstorf station =

Railway station in Germany

Wunstorf
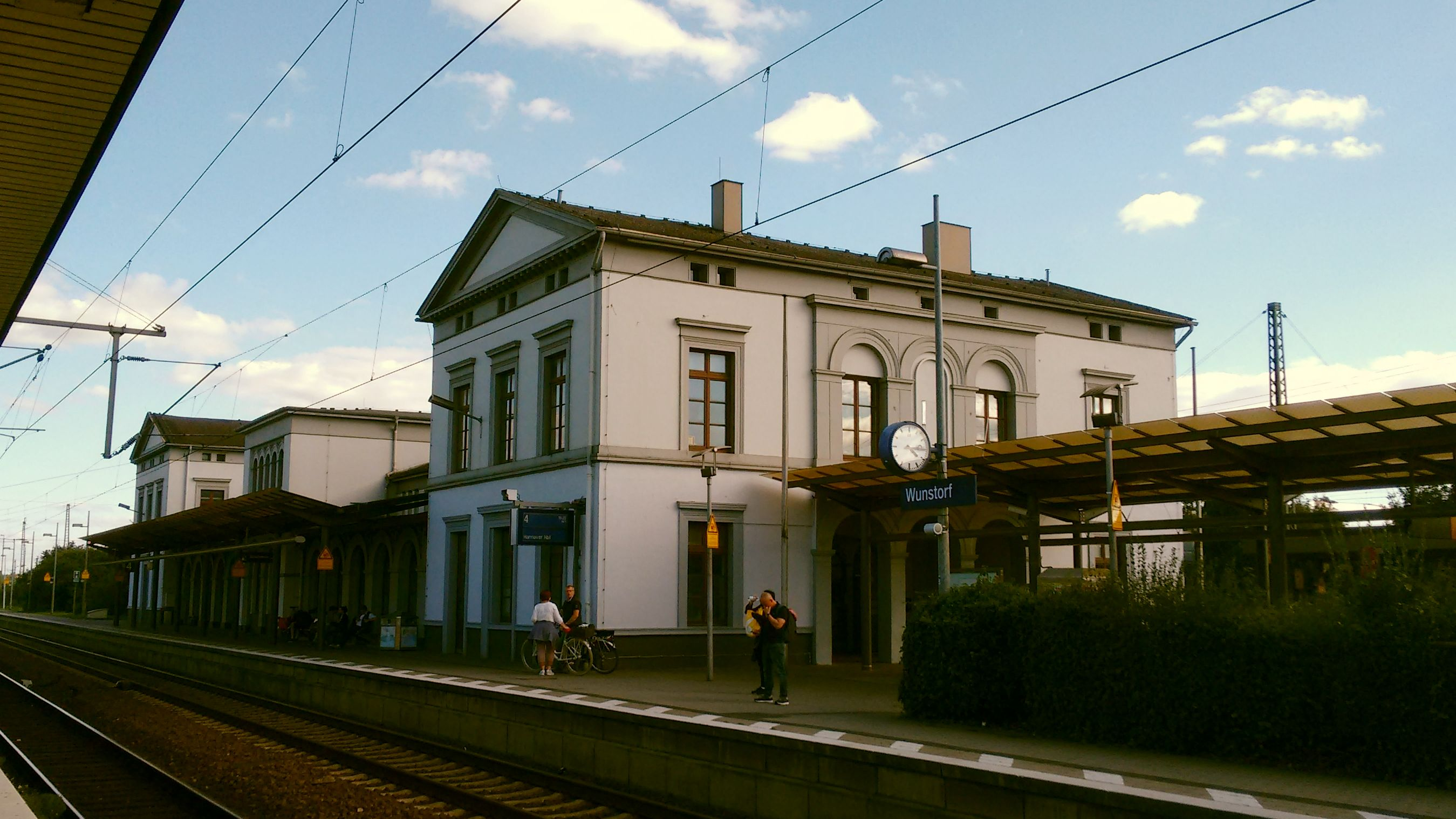
- Wunstorf station

General information
- Location: Wunstorf, Lower Saxony; Germany
- Coordinates: 52.42218°N 9.45101°E
- Lines: Hanover–Minden railway Bremen–Hanover railway
- Platforms: 6

Other information
- Fare zone: GVH: C

Services
Preceding station	DB Regio Nord	Following station
Neustadt am Rübenberge towards Norddeich Mole	RE 1	Hannover Hbf Terminus
Neustadt am Rübenberge towards Bremerhaven-Lehe	RE 8	Hannover Hbf Terminus
Preceding station		Following station
Haste (Han) towards Rheine	RE 60	Hannover Hbf towards Braunschweig Hbf
Haste (Han) towards Bielefeld Hbf	RE 70	Hannover Hbf towards Braunschweig Hbf
Preceding station	Hanover S-Bahn	Following station
Haste (Han) towards Minden (Westfalen)	S 1	Dedensen-Gümmer towards Haste (Han)
Poggenhagen towards Nienburg (Weser)	S 2	Dedensen-Gümmer towards Haste (Han)
Location

Wunstorf (German: Bahnhof Wunstorf) is a railway station located in Wunstorf, Germany. The station opened in 1847 and is located on the Hanover–Minden railway and Bremen–Hanover railway. The train services are operated by Deutsche Bahn and WestfalenBahn. The station is also served by the Hanover S-Bahn.

A 6-kilometre (3.7 mi) single-track spur runs to Bokeloh. It is used exclusively by freight trains operated by Osthannoversche Eisenbahnen (OHE), serving a former potash mine.

== Train services ==
The following services currently call at the station:

- Regional services RE 1 Norddeich - Emden - Oldenburg - Bremen - Nienburg - Hanover
- Regional services RE 8 Bremerhaven-Lehe - Bremen - Nienburg - Hanover
- Regional services RE 60 Rheine - Osnabrück - Minden - Hannover - Braunschweig
- Regional services RE 70 Bielefeld - Minden - Hannover - Braunschweig
- Hannover S-Bahn services S 1 Minden - Haste - Wunstorf - Hanover - Weetzen - Haste
- Hannover S-Bahn services S 2 Nienburg - Wunstorf - Hanover - Weetzen - Haste
