= Deister Railway =

Railway line in Lower-Saxony, Germany

Haste–Weetzen railway

Overview
- Native name: Deisterbahn
- Line number: 1761
- Locale: Lower Saxony, Germany

Service
- Route number: 360.1; 360.2; 212a (1962)

Technical
- Line length: 25.4 km (15.8 mi)
- Number of tracks: 2: Weetzen–Barsinghausen
- Track gauge: 1,435 mm (4 ft 8 1/2 in) standard gauge
- Electrification: 15 kV/16.7 Hz AC overhead catenary
- Operating speed: Weetzen–Barsinghausen: 120 km/h (74.6 mph); Barsinghausen–Haste: 80 km/h (49.7 mph)

The Deister Railway (German: Deisterbahn or Deisterstrecke) is a railway line in the German state of Lower Saxony between Weetzen and Haste. It is now a section of the Hanover S-Bahn network.

== History ==
The concession for the main line to Altenbeken as well as the branch to Haste was granted to the Hanover-Altenbeken Railway Company (Hannover-Altenbekener Eisenbahn-Gesellschaft) on 25 November 1868. The railway line was built mainly for the transport of bulk goods (Deister coal, stones and sugar beets from the Calenberg Land). The Weetzen–Barsinghausen section was opened on 1 May 1872 and the remaining part to Haste on 15 August 1872. At this time the halts of Winninghausen, Lemmie, Kirchdorf and Bantorf did not yet exist. The line to Barsinghausen was initially served by two train pairs daily and after the extension to Haste the entire line had three pairs of trains. The line was also immediately used for the delivery of mail to the stations of Barsinghausen and Wennigsen.

The halt of Winninghausen was opened on 1 October 1901. Since 1902, at the latest, there were efforts by the farmers of Lemmie and Sorsum for the establishment of a halt at Lemmie. They were also supported by the farmers at Bönnigsen. Although the road for them to Wennigsen station was much shorter, it was more laborious for horse-drawn carts because of a steep slope. Finally, the halt of Lemmie was opened on land of the municipal council of Ditfurth on 15 December 1904. This was next to the manor of Lemmie, which had made it available free of charge. The halts of Kirchdorf (opened in 1955 in the Egestorf municipality) and Bantorf (1975) followed much later.

A steam locomotive hauled a regular passenger train over the line for the last time on 22 March 1969 and train operations were switched to diesel haulage. According to recruitment plans of Deutsche Bundesbahn at the end of the 1960s, the line was electrified with financial support from the municipal association of Greater Hanover (Großraumverband, GVH), a legal predecessor of today’s Hanover Region, and was opened with the first operation with an electric locomotive on 31 May 1970. The line was operated at first by push–pull locomotives with Silberling coaches; from 1989 it was operated with City-Bahn wagons, mainly using class 141 electric locomotives in push-pull mode. The locomotive usually ran at the Haste end of the trains.

At the end of 1990s, the stations were modernised or rebuilt or relocated (Egestorf) and double track was installed on the section from Weetzen to Egestorf during the establishment of Hanover S-Bahn for the upcoming Expo 2000. Y-shaped sleepers were used. Only a short section directly west of the station of Weetzen is still single track, as duplication would have caused a significant increase in costs with only a small benefit. Prior to the duplication, the only passing places on the section between Weetzen and Barsinghausen were in the stations of Wennigsen and Egestorf. The scheduled train crossings took place in Egestorf.

The stations of Wennigsen, Egestorf, and Barsinghausen had additional sidings for freight operations. These operations ceased in Egestorf in the 1970s, in Wennigsen in the 1980s. The sidings have been removed when the line was converted to a S-Bahn line, as well as the local operated mechanical signal boxes in these stations. Bad Nenndorf was the station where the line to Bad Münder started. After that line was closed all sidings, signals and the signal box were removed, and the station was reclassified as a halt.

Barsinghausen had sidings east of the station, too. To the south the mine of Klosterstollen was reached and its Schacht IV (shaft 4) lay to the north. The remainder of the latter track is still in use for some industrial customers.

In 2014 and 2015, a road flyover was built in Haste and the pedestrian tunnel in the area of the station was extended. The level crossing on Waldstraße directly south of the station was subsequently lifted.

== Route ==
The line runs on the north-eastern side of the Deister hills. It branches from the Hanover–Altenbeken line in Weetzen, which is in the municipality of Ronnenberg, and extends from there through Gehrden, Wennigsen, Barsinghausen, Bad Nenndorf and Haste to the Hanover–Minden line. In the area of Egestorf (Deister) station, the line runs directly on the edge of the Deister range. The route is largely flat and has no tunnels. Near Weetzen junction the line passes over federal highway B 217. West of Wennigsen station it runs under state highway 391 in a cutting. Many other intersections with roads are level crossings, e.g. at the stations of Weetzen, Lemmie, Wennigsen, Egestorf and Kirchdorf, and in several places in the town of Barsinghausen.

Since a considerable part of the route runs along at the foot the Deister, which are the closest hills to Hanover, rising to a height of 405 m, it is also used heavily at weekends for excursions and walks. At Haste station the Deister line terminates on a separate track, running beside the line connecting Hanover to Minden and the Ruhr region.

The stations in Weetzen and Haste are classified by Deutsche Bahn as category 4, the halts in Kirchdorf and Winninghausen in category 6, while all other stations are classified as category 6.

== Operations ==
The line is now used by the S1 and S2 services of the Hanover S-Bahn and since 15 December 2013, it has also been used by S21 services. Services operate from 5:00 to 22:00 every half hour from Mondays to Fridays, providing the best service of the Deister Railway in its history. The scheduled crossings of the trains on lines S1 and S2 on the western section of the line take place at Bantorf station. On the eastern section, the crossings take place between Egestorf and Weetzen.

There is now little freight traffic on the line, although two companies in the industrial area of Barsinghausen are served about once daily from Hannover-Linden by gas tankers and flatcars for steel products. This traffic is carried out by the Linden port railway (Lindener Hafenbahn). The traffic is usually operated with a Voith Gravita and runs from Hannover-Linden via Weetzen to Barsinghausen. The return journey has usually run via Haste since the introduction of the S21 due to line conflicts.

In the design of the timetable it was ensured that there were convenient connections in both directions in Haste and towards Hamlin in Weetzen. Together with the bus connections, the goal of an integrated timetable has almost been achieved in the area of the Deister Railway.

In the event of disruptions in the vicinity of Hannover Hauptbahnhof, the line is sometimes used as a detour for long-distance trains, so IC or ICE services can also be seen here from time to time.

== Current situation ==
=== Infrastructure ===
Operationally, the line from Weetzen to Barsinghausen is classified as a main line and from Barsinghausen to Haste as a branch line.

The line is electrified throughout and in the section from Weetzen (excluding the station entrance) to Egestorf it is double-track and otherwise it is single-track. There is still an industrial siding only in Barsinghausen, which is not electrified. Furthermore in Barsinghausen station there are still remains of the former third station track, which is not connected to the line. All other sidings are completely dismantled.

=== Signals ===
The line is controlled by 2 signal boxes. The eastern part of the line up to and including Wennigsen station is controlled by the Weetzen relay interlocking and the section from Egestorf to Bantorf is controlled by the signal box in Barsinghausen station. Another signal box, located in Haste station, controls only the area of the local station.

H/V light signals are used throughout the line, some of compact design.

The two level crossings directly south of Weetzen station and directly west of Barsinghausen station are protected by full barriers (four arms). All of the intervening level crossings and most of the level crossings west of Barsinghausen are secured with half barriers. On the western section there are also level crossings protected only by St. Andrew's crosses.

== Further planning ==
In Barsinghausen station, the platform on track 2 is to be extended to 210 metres for about €2 million.

An upgrade project for an improved freight bypass of the city of Hanover has been included in the Federal Transport Infrastructure Plan (Bundesverkehrswegeplan) 2015; this includes a new connecting curve in the area of Weetzen.

The region plans another halt at Hannover-Waldhausen. In order to compensate for the resulting lengthening of travel time, the section between Bantorf and Winninghausen is to be upgraded to two tracks.
