= Dedensen-Gümmer station =

Railway station in Germany

Coordinates: 52°24′26″N 9°31′15″E

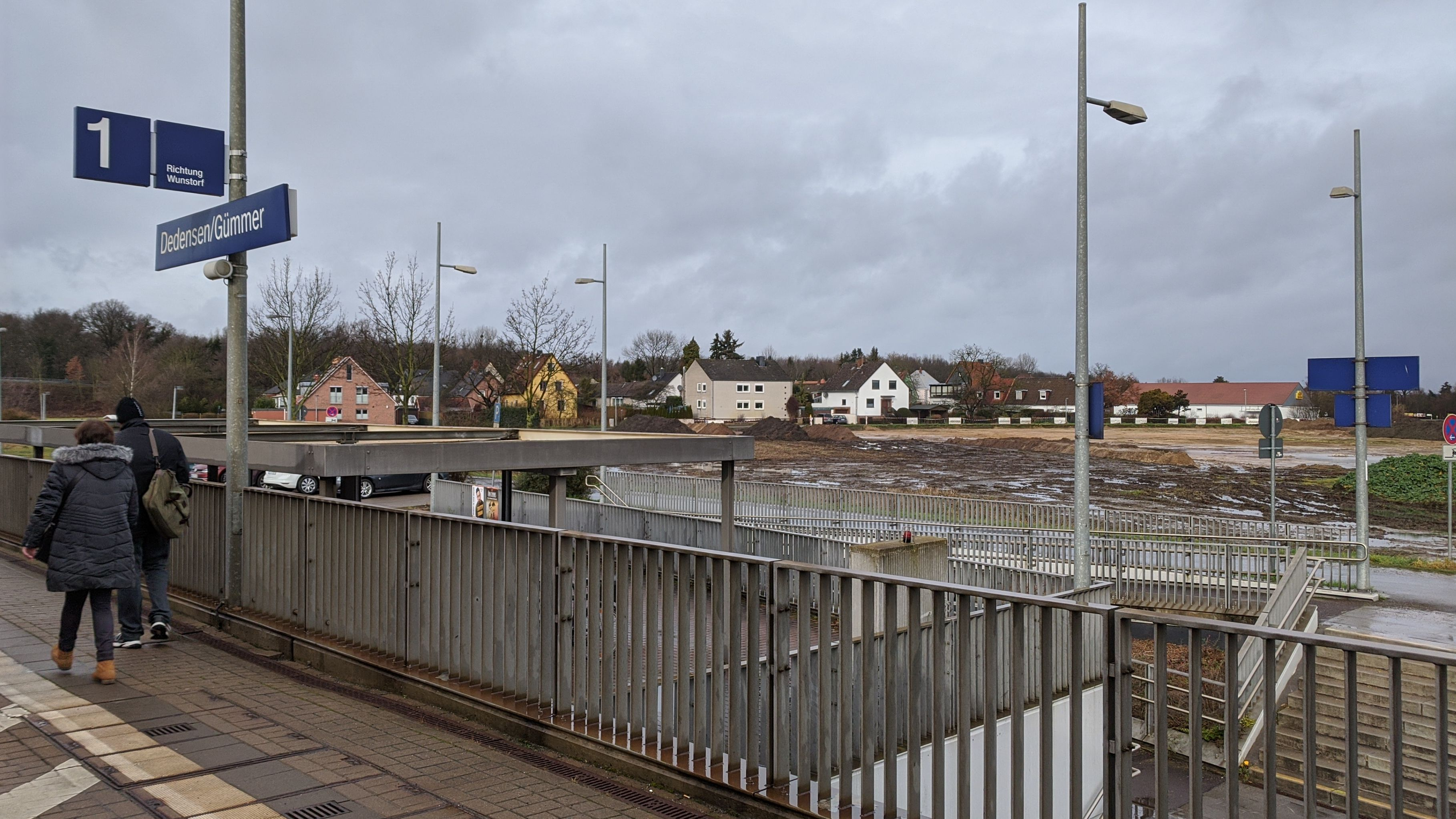
Dedensen-Gümmer station in 2020

Dedensen-Gümmer is a railway station located in Dedensen and Gümmer, Germany. The station is located on the Hanover–Minden railway and the Bremen–Hanover railway. The train services are operated by Deutsche Bahn as part of the Hanover S-Bahn. Dedensen-Gümmer is served by the S1 and S2. It is in the Umland zone of Hannover.

== Train services ==
The following services currently call at Dedensen-Gümmer:

Preceding station	Hanover S-Bahn	Following station
Wunstorf towards Minden (Westfalen)	S 1	Seelze towards Haste (Han)
Wunstorf towards Nienburg (Weser)	S 2	Seelze towards Haste (Han)
