= Kirchhorsten station =

Railway station in Helpsen, Germany

Kirchhorsten
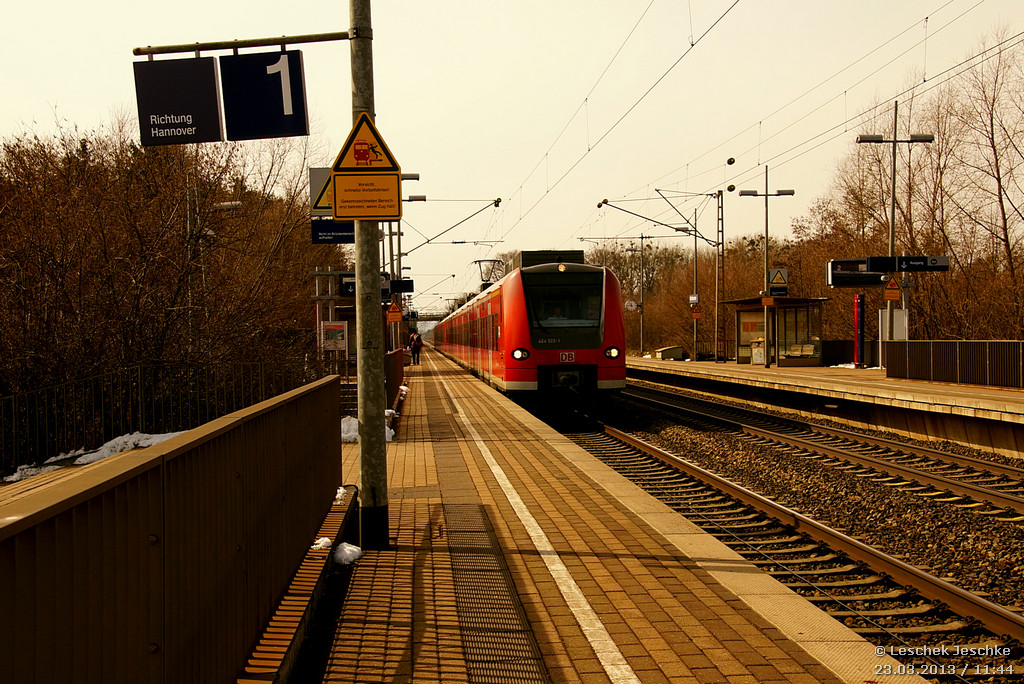

General information
- Location: Seggebruch, Lower Saxony, Germany
- Coordinates: 52°18′29″N 9°07′16″E
- Line: Hanover–Minden railway
- Platforms: 2
- Tracks: 2

Other information
- Fare zone: VLS: Nienstädt, Helpsen (buses only); GVH: E (VLS transitional tariff, monthly passes only)

Services
| Preceding station | Hanover S-Bahn | Following station |
|---|---|---|
| Bückeburg towards Minden (Westfalen) | S 1 | Stadthagen towards Haste (Han) |
Location

Kirchhorsten is a railway station located in Seggebruch, Germany. The station is located on the Hannover to Minden railway. The train services are operated by Deutsche Bahn as part of the Hanover S-Bahn. Kirchhorsten is served by the S1.

== Train services ==
The following services currently call at Kirchhorsten:
