= Eilvese station =

Railway station in Neustadt am Rübenberge, Germany

Eilvese
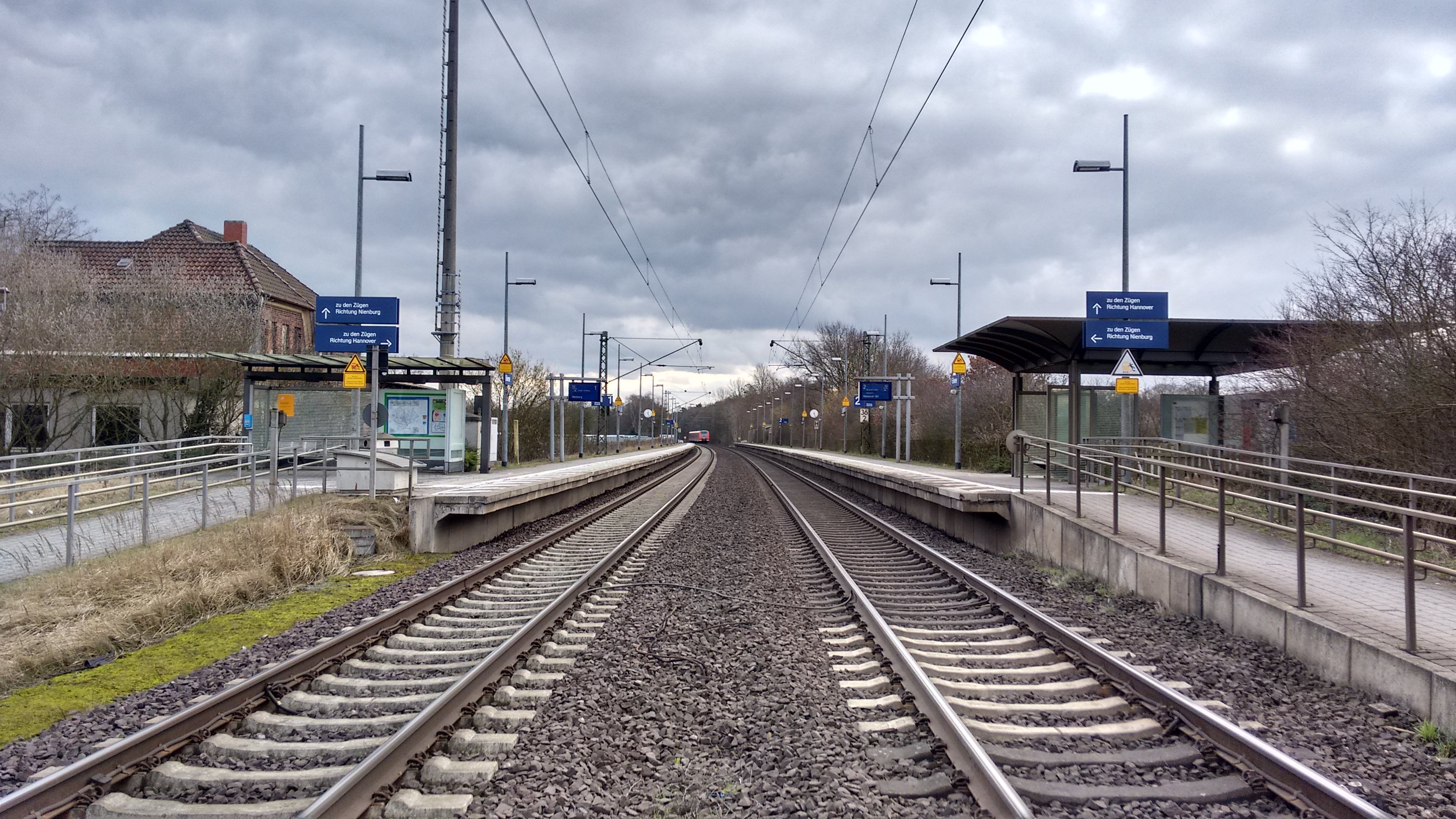
- The station platforms in 2017

General information
- Location: Eilveser Hauptstr. 1 Neustadt am Rübenberge, Lower Saxony; Germany
- Coordinates: 52°32′40″N 9°25′45″E
- Owner: Deutsche Bahn
- Lines: Wunstorf–Bremen (KBS 380)
- Distance: 36 km (22 mi) from Hannover
- Platforms: 2 side platforms
- Tracks: 2
- Train operators: Transdev Hannover

Other information
- Station code: 1518
- DS100 code: HEIV
- IBNR: 8001713
- Category: 6
- Fare zone: C (Üstra)

Services
| Preceding station | Hanover S-Bahn | Following station |
|---|---|---|
| Hagen (Han) towards Nienburg (Weser) | S 2 | Neustadt am Rübenberge towards Haste (Han) |
Location

Eilvese station (German: Bahnhof Eilvese) is a railway station located in Eilvese, Germany. The station is located on the Wunstorf–Bremen railway line. The train services are operated by Transdev Hannover as part of the Hanover S-Bahn. Elivese is served by the S2.

== Services ==
As of the April 2025 timetable change, the following services stop at Eilvese:

- S 2: hourly service between Nienburg (Weser) and Haste (Han)
