= Bückeburg station =

Railway station in Bückeburg, Germany

Bückeburg
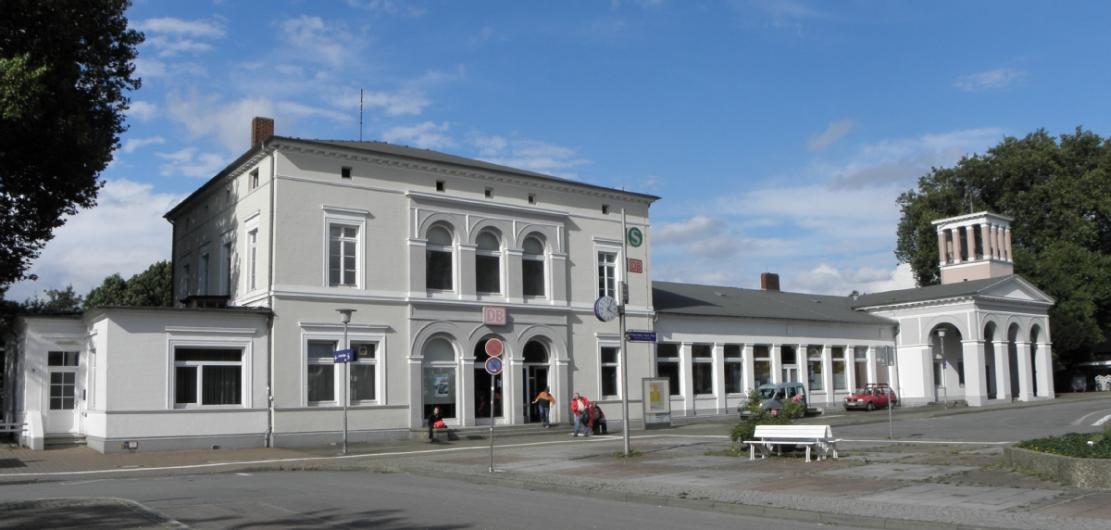

General information
- Location: Bückeburg, Lower Saxony, Germany
- Coordinates: 52°16′3″N 9°02′51″E
- Line: Hanover–Minden railway
- Platforms: 3
- Tracks: 4

Other information
- Fare zone: VLS: Bückeburg, Süd (buses only); GVH: E (VLS transitional tariff, monthly passes only)

History
- Opened: 1847

Services
Preceding station		Following station
Minden (Westfalen) towards Rheine	RE 60	Stadthagen towards Braunschweig Hbf
Minden (Westfalen) towards Bielefeld Hbf	RE 70	Stadthagen towards Braunschweig Hbf
Preceding station	Hanover S-Bahn	Following station
Minden (Westfalen) Terminus	S 1	Kirchhorsten towards Haste (Han)
Location

Bückeburg is a railway station located in Bückeburg, Germany. The station was opened in 1847 and is located on the Hanover–Minden railway. The train services are operated by Deutsche Bahn and WestfalenBahn.

== Train services ==
The station is served by the following services:

- Regional services RE 60 Rheine - Osnabrück - Minden - Hanover - Braunschweig
- Regional services RE 70 Bielefeld - Herford - Minden - Hanover - Braunschweig
- Hannover S-Bahn services S 1 Minden - Haste - Wunstorf - Hanover - Weetzen - Haste
