= Hannover Bismarckstraße station =

Railway station in Hanover, Germany

Hannover Bismarckstraße
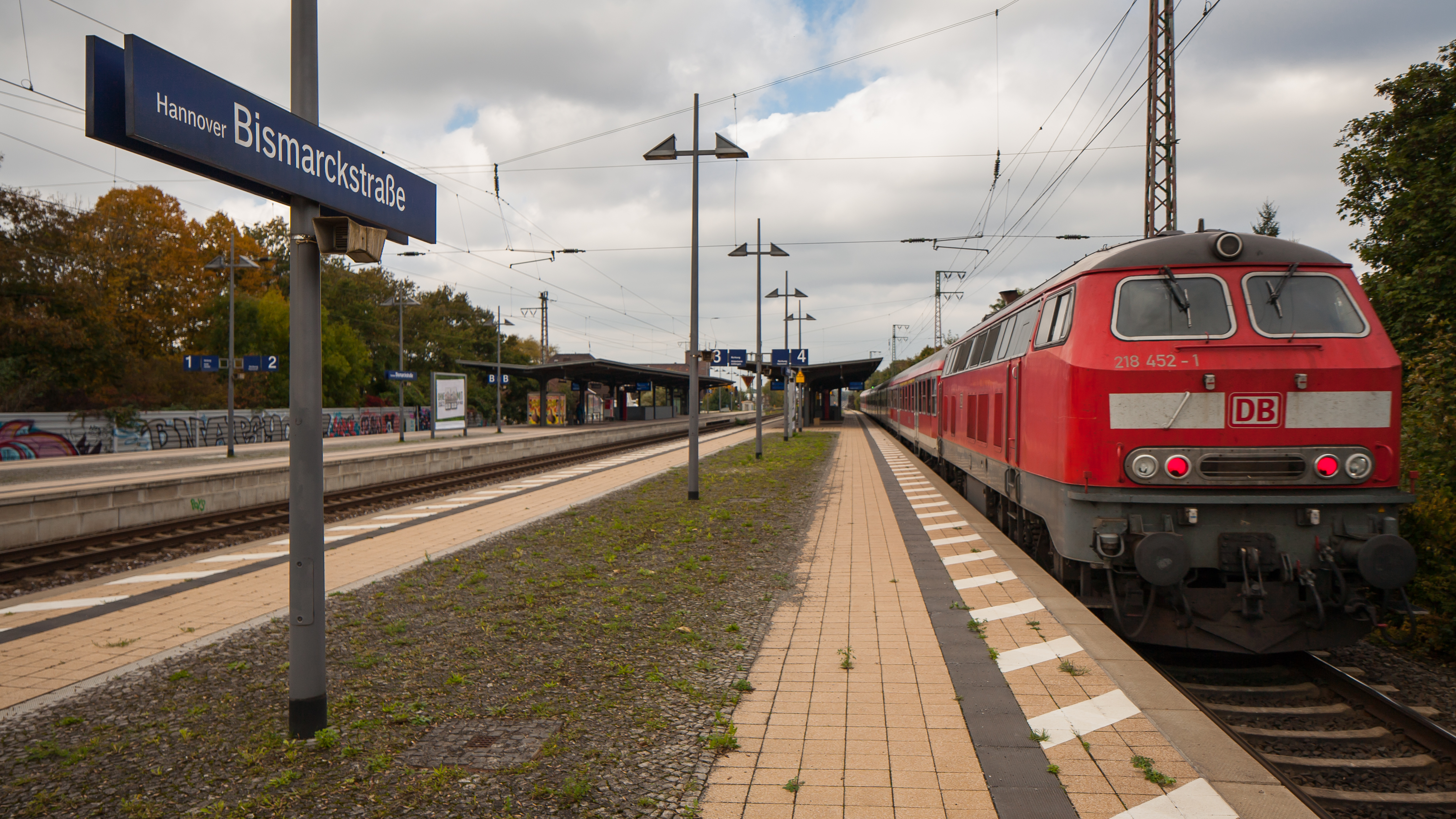
- Hannover Bismarckstraße railway station

General information
- Location: Hannover, Lower Saxony; Germany
- Coordinates: 52.356838°N 9.769934°E
- Owner: DB Netz
- Operator: DB Station&Service
- Lines: Hanoverian Southern Railway Hanover–Würzburg high-speed railway Hanover–Altenbeken railway
- Platforms: 4

Other information
- Station code: 2544
- DS100 code: HHBI
- IBNR: 8002580
- Category: 4
- Fare zone: GVH: A
- Website: www.bahnhof.de

Services
Preceding station	Hanover S-Bahn	Following station
Hannover Hbf towards Minden (Westfalen)	S 1	Linden/Fischerhof towards Haste (Han)
Hannover Hbf towards Nienburg (Weser)	S 2	Linden/Fischerhof towards Haste (Han)
Hannover Hbf towards Bennemühlen	S 4	Messe/Laatzen towards Hildesheim Hbf
Hannover Hbf towards Flughafen	S 5	Linden/Fischerhof towards Paderborn Hbf
Hannover Hbf towards Flughafen	S 8	Messe/Laatzen Terminus
Hannover Hbf Terminus	S 21	Linden/Fischerhof towards Barsinghausen
Hannover Hbf towards Hameln	S 51 Minden	Linden/Fischerhof towards Seelze
Location
- Location within Lower Saxony Location within Germany Location within Europe

Hannover Bismarckstraße is a railway station located in Hannover, Germany. The station opened on 1 May 1911 and is located on the Hanoverian Southern Railway, Hanover–Würzburg high-speed railway and Hanover–Altenbeken railway. The train services are operated by Deutsche Bahn as part of the Hanover S-Bahn.

== Train services ==
The following services currently call at the station:

- Hannover S-Bahn services S1 Minden - Haste - Wunstorf - Hanover - Weetzen - Haste
- Hannover S-Bahn services S2 Nienburg - Wunstorf - Hanover - Weetzen - Haste
- Hannover S-Bahn services S4 Bennemühlen - Langenhagen - Hannover - Hannover Messe/Laatzen - Hildesheim
- Hannover S-Bahn services S5 Hannover Airport - Langenhagen - Hannover - Weetzen - Hameln - Paderborn
- Hannover S-Bahn services S8 Hannover Airport - Langenhagen - Hannover - Hannover Messe/Laatzen
