= Hannover-Linden/Fischerhof station =

Railway station in Hanover, Germany

Hannover Linden/Fischerhof
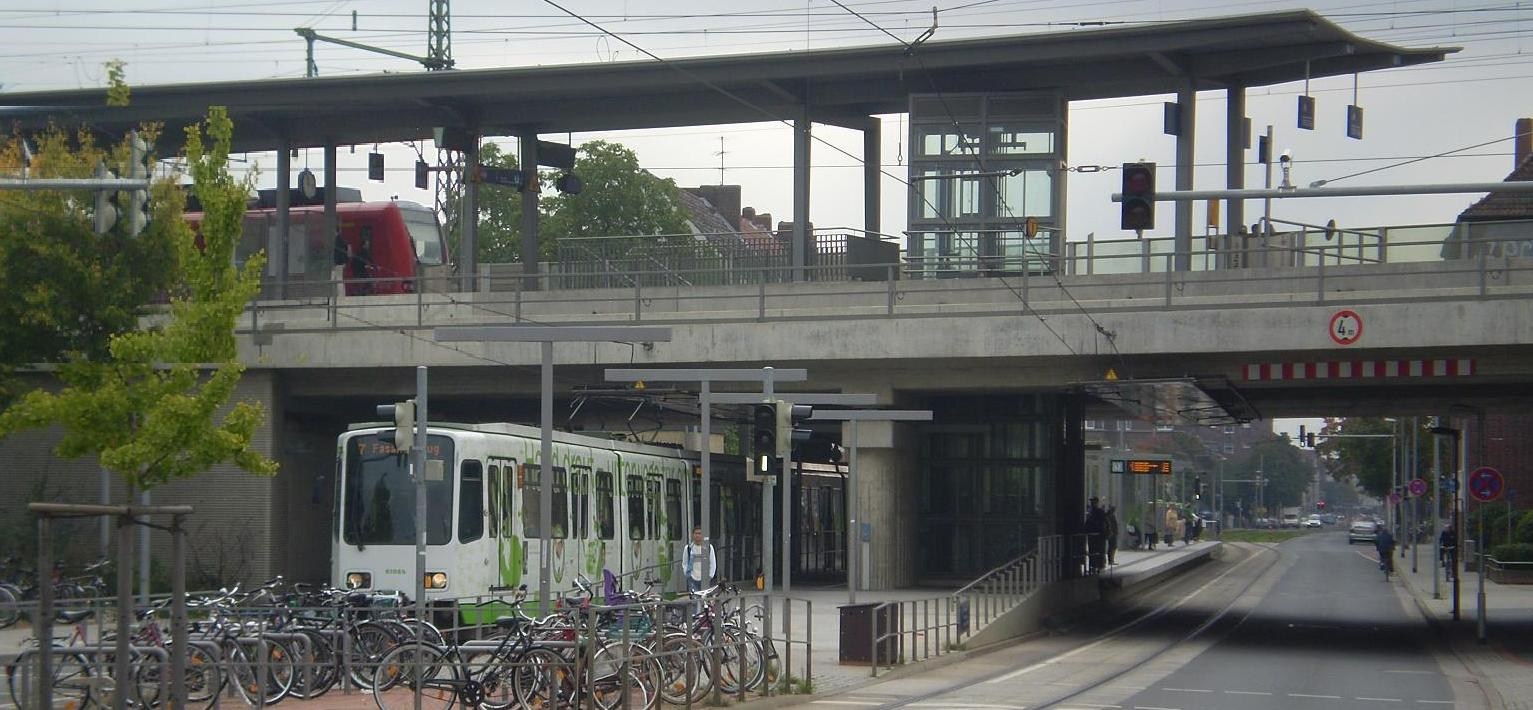
- Hannover-Linden/Fischerhof railway station

General information
- Location: Hannover, Lower Saxony; Germany
- Coordinates: 52.2109°N 9.4321°E
- Lines: Hannover Hbf–Altenbeken; Wunstorf–Lehrte
- Platforms: 2

Other information
- Station code: 2551
- Category: 4
- Fare zone: GVH: A

Services
Preceding station	Hanover S-Bahn	Following station
Bornum towards Haste (Han)	S 1	Bismarckstraße towards Minden (Westfalen)
Bornum towards Haste (Han)	S 2	Bismarckstraße towards Nienburg (Weser)
Weetzen towards Paderborn Hbf	S 5	Bismarckstraße towards Flughafen
Empelde towards Barsinghausen	S 21	Bismarckstraße towards Hannover Hbf
Springe towards Hameln	S 51	Bismarckstraße towards Seelze
Location

Hannover-Linden/Fischerhof is a railway station located in Hannover, Germany. The station opened in 1872 and is located on the Hanover–Altenbeken line and the Hanover freight bypass. The train services are operated by Deutsche Bahn as part of the Hanover S-Bahn.

== Train services ==
The following services currently call at the station:

- Hannover S-Bahn services S1 Minden - Haste - Wunstorf - Hannover - Weetzen - Haste
- Hannover S-Bahn services S2 Nienburg - Wunstorf - Hannover - Weetzen - Haste
- Hannover S-Bahn services S5 Hannover Airport - Langenhagen - Hannover - Weetzen - Hameln - Paderborn

== Tram services ==
Hanover Stadtbahn lines 3, 7 and 17 also serve the station.

- 3: Altwarmbüchen - Stadtfriedhof - Podbielskistraße - Hauptbahnhof - City Centre - Linden/Fischerhof - Wettbergen
- 7: Schierholzstraße - Podbielskistraße - Hauptbahnhof - City Centre - Linden/Fischerhof - Wettbergen
- 17: Aegidientorplatz - Hauptbahnhof - Humboldstraße - Linden/Fischerhof - Wallensteinstraße
