= Wremen station =

Railway station in Wremen, Germany

Coordinates: 53.6471°N 8.5210°E

Wremen
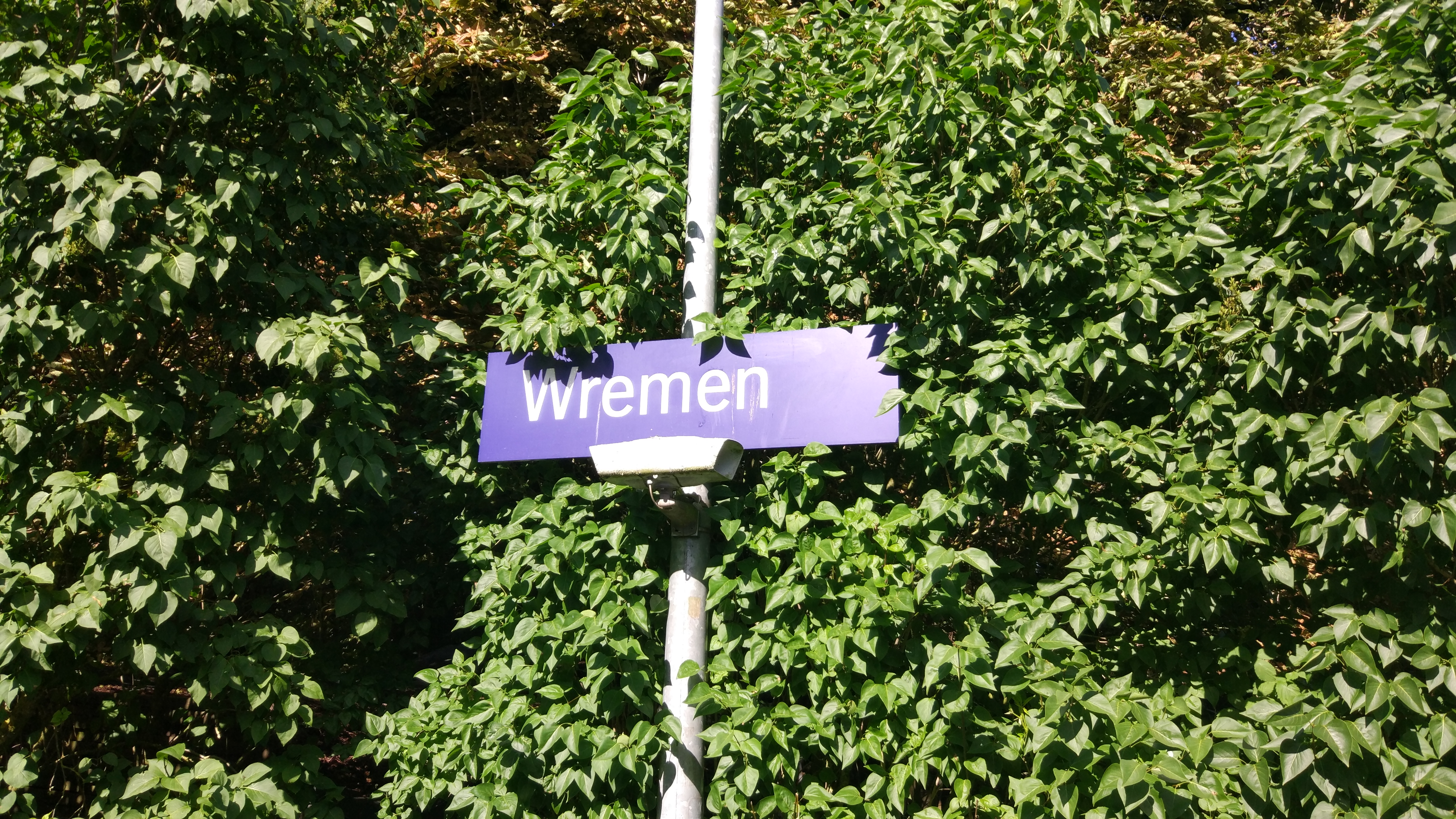

General information
- Location: Wremen, Land Wursten, Lower Saxony; Germany
- Line: Bremerhaven–Cuxhaven railway
- Platforms: 1

Other information
- Station code: 6895
- DS100 code: AWRE
- Category: 6
- Fare zone: VBN: 255 and 270
- Website: www.bahnhof.de

Services
Preceding station	EVB	Following station
Dorum towards Cuxhaven	RB 33	Bremerhaven-Lehe towards Buxtehude
Location

Wremen is a railway station on the Nordseebahn line from Cuxhaven to Bremerhaven in Northwestern Germany. It is situated close to the village of Wremen.

== History ==
The station was opened in 1896 as part of the extension of the Bremen-Bremerhaven line towards Cuxhaven. It has remained a minor station throughout its whole existence, as the single-track line towards Cuxhaven allowed for crossings only at Dorum railway station.

To the south, in the village of Imsum, there used to be another similarly minor station. However, it was closed and removed in the late 1970s. The Bremerhaven-Speckenbüttel railway station, south of Imsum, was closed in 1988. Therefore, Wremen is a notable distance north of the nearest station currently in operation.

Ever since the advent of motorcars, the station mainly serves commuters into Bremerhaven and tourists. At some point, even international InterRegio trains to Luxembourg and Saarbrücken called at the station, though this service was discontinued in the late 1990s.

== Train services ==
The following services currently call at the station:

- Local services RB 33 Cuxhaven - Dorum - Bremerhaven - Bremervörde - Buxtehude

== Operational usage ==
The station today is a very minor station, as all buildings have been scrapped in the 1960s and 1970s, it has since been reduced to the status of a stop. It underwent some renovation in the early 2000s (decade) to bring its sub-standard platform up to par; when InterRegio trains to Luxembourg were still calling at the station (mainly for tourist reasons), the passengers had to deal with a height difference of 85 centimetres between car floor and platform. Today, EVB services call at the station in varying intervals, usually hourly during weekdays.
