= Poggenhagen station =

Railway station in Poggenhagen, Germany

Poggenhagen
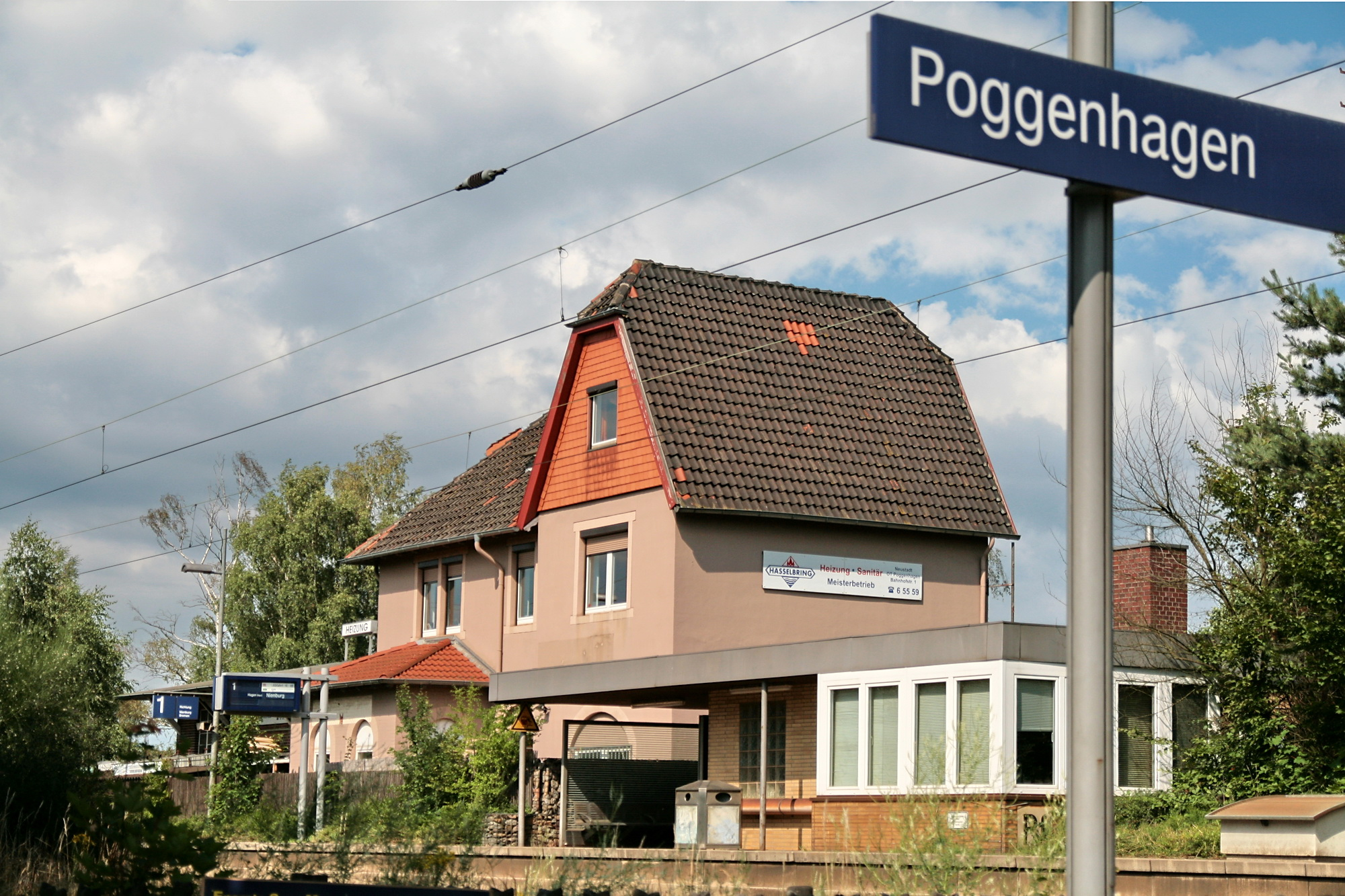

General information
- Location: Poggenhagen, Lower Saxony, Germany
- Coordinates: 52°28′02″N 9°27′14″E
- Lines: Wunstorf–Bremen (KBS 380)
- Distance: 26.9 km (16.7 mi) from Hannover
- Platforms: 2 side platforms
- Tracks: 2
- Train operators: Transdev Hannover

Other information
- Station code: 4979
- DS100 code: HPOG
- IBNR: 8004851
- Category: 6
- Fare zone: C (Üstra)
- Website: www.bahnhof.de/en/poggenhagen

History
- Opened: 1908

Services
Preceding station	Hanover S-Bahn	Following station
Neustadt am Rübenberge towards Nienburg (Weser)	S 2	Wunstorf towards Haste (Han)
Location
- Location within Lower Saxony

Poggenhagen station (German: Bahnhof Poggenhagen) is a railway station located in Poggenhagen, a borough of Neustadt am Rübenberge, Germany. The station is located on the Wunstorf–Bremen railway line and was opened in 1908.

Passing sidings on the western side of the station are also used to run a non-electrified spur to nearby Wunstorf Air Base, but traffic on this spur is very infrequent in recent years. Historically, the spur was of major importance to transport goods to the base during the Berlin Airlift of 1948–49.

== Services ==
As of the April 2025 timetable change, the following services stop at Poggenhagen:

- S 2: hourly service between Nienburg (Weser) and Haste (Han)
