= Stadthagen station =

Railway station in Stadthagen, Lower Saxony, Germany

Stadthagen
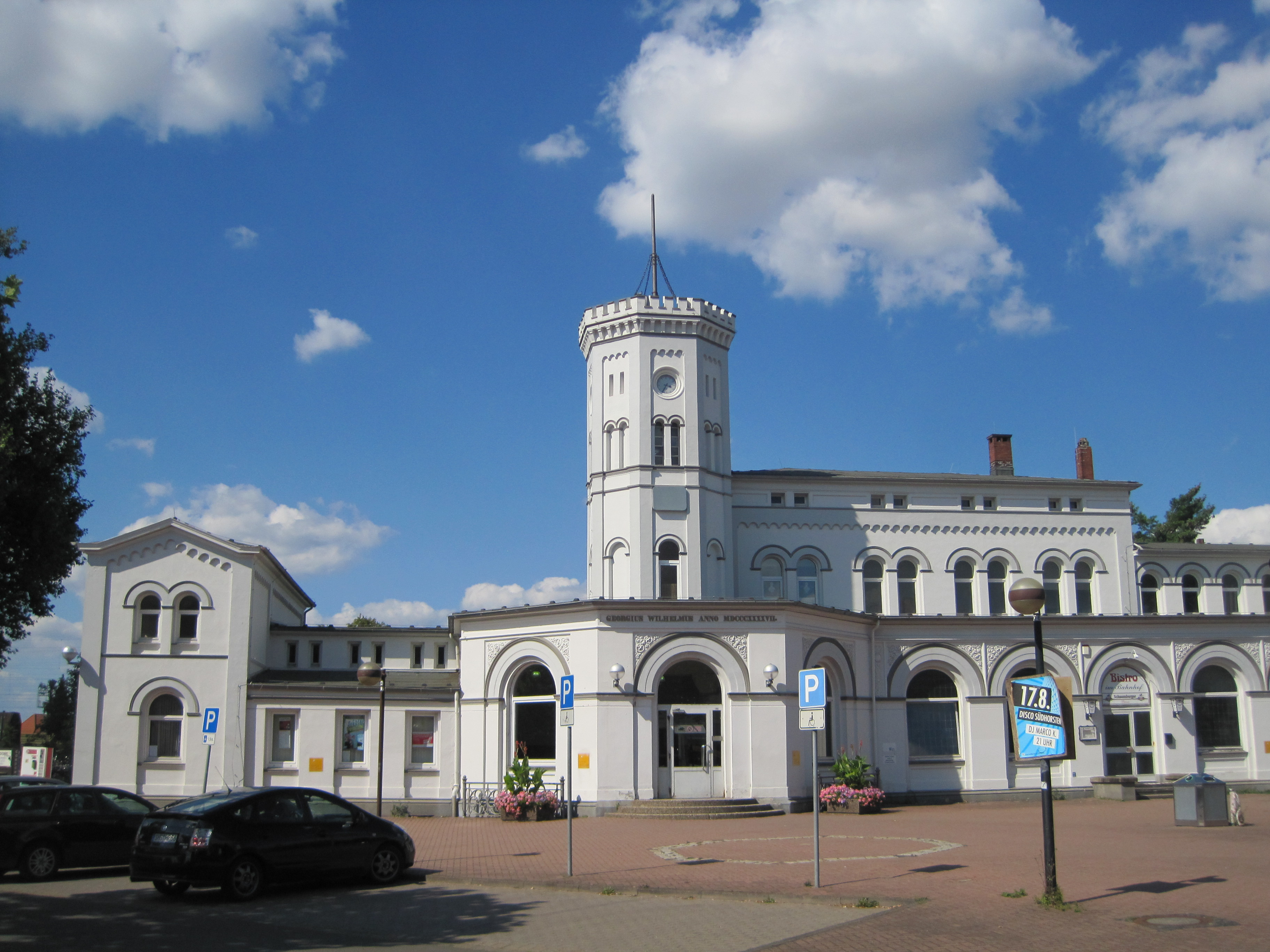
- Stadthagen station in 2012

General information
- Location: Stadthagen, Lower Saxony, Germany
- Coordinates: 52°19′59″N 9°11′24″E
- Line: Hanover–Minden railway
- Platforms: 4

Other information
- Fare zone: VLS: Stadthagen, Mitte (buses only); GVH: E (VLS transitional tariff, monthly passes only)

Services
Preceding station		Following station
Bückeburg towards Rheine	RE 60	Haste (Han) towards Braunschweig Hbf
Bückeburg towards Bielefeld Hbf	RE 70	Haste (Han) towards Braunschweig Hbf
Preceding station	Hanover S-Bahn	Following station
Kirchhorsten towards Minden (Westfalen)	S 1	Lindhorst towards Haste (Han)
Location

Stadthagen is a railway station located in Stadthagen, Germany. The station is located on the Hanover–Minden railway. The train services are operated by Deutsche Bahn and WestfalenBahn.

== Train services ==
The station is served by the following services:

- Regional servicesRE 60 Rheine - Osnabrück - Minden - Hanover - Braunschweig
- Regional services RE 70 Bielefeld - Herford - Minden - Hanover - Braunschweig
- Hannover S-Bahn services S 1 Minden - Haste - Wunstorf - Hanover - Weetzen - Haste

== S-Bahn Hannover ==
Stadthagen is served by the S1. It is in the Außenraum zone of Hanover.
