= Eilvese =

- Ortsteil of Neustadt am Rübenberge
- Interactive map of Eilvese
- Location within Germany Location within Lower Saxony
- Coordinates: 52°32′47″N 9°24′53″E
- Country: Germany
- State: Lower Saxony
- District: Hanover
- Town: Neustadt am Rübenberge

Area
  - Total: 16.59 km^{2} (6.41 sq mi)

Population (2021)
  - Total: 1,626
  - Density: 98.01/km^{2} (253.8/sq mi)
- Time zone: UTC+01:00 (CET)
  - Summer (DST): UTC+02:00 (CEST)
- Postal codes: 31535
- Dialling codes: 05034

Eilvese is a borough of Neustadt am Rübenberge in the district of Hanover, Lower Saxony in Germany. It had a population of 1626 in 2021.

== Transportation ==
Eilvese has a railway station and is served by line S2 of the Hanover S-Bahn.
