= Lindhorst station =

Railway station in Lindhorst, Germany

Lindhorst (Schaumb-Lippe)
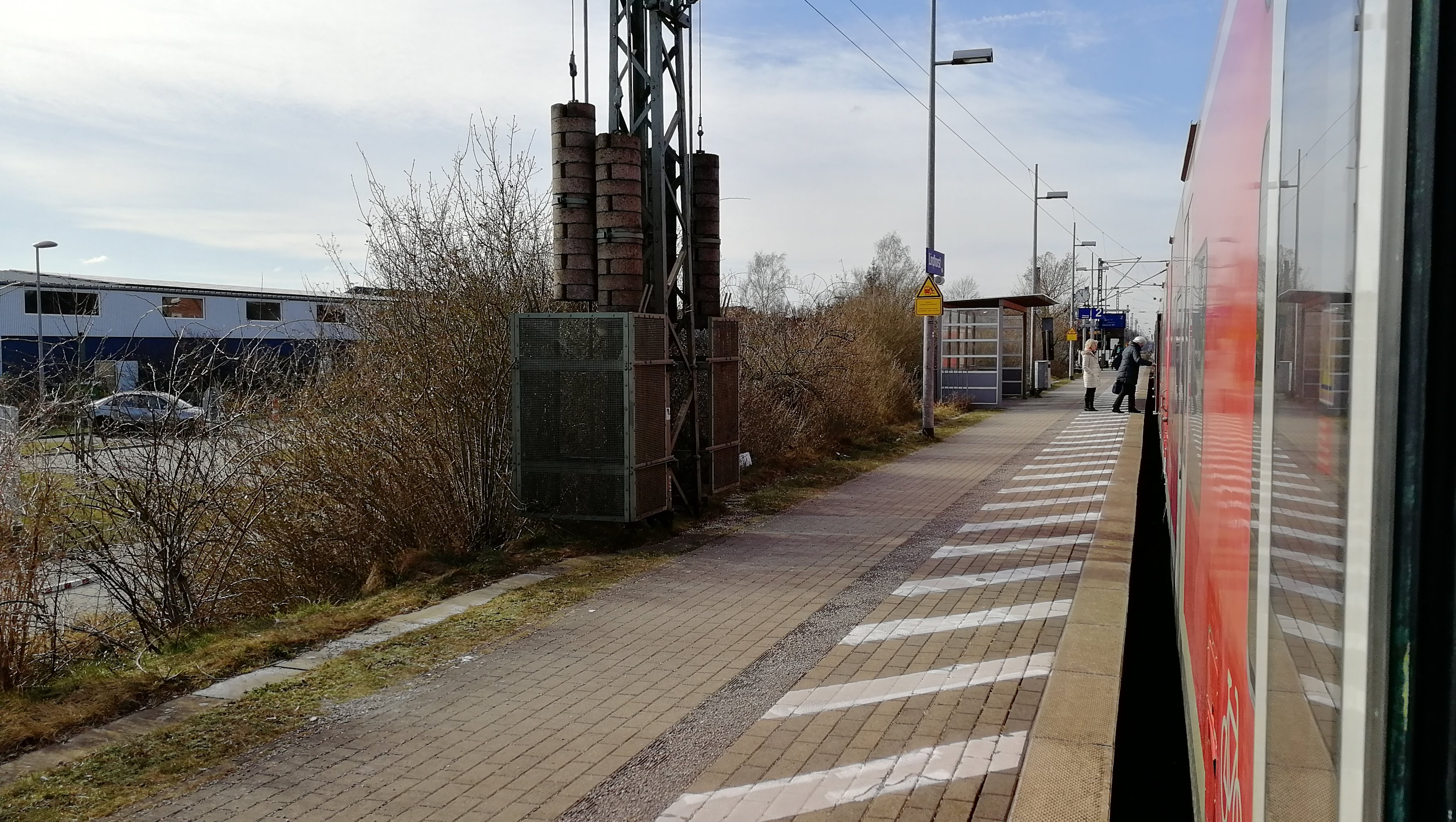
- Lindhorst railway station in 2018

General information
- Location: Lindhorst, Lower Saxony, Germany
- Coordinates: 52°21′15″N 9°17′17″E
- Line: Hanover–Minden railway
- Platforms: 2
- Tracks: 2

Other information
- Fare zone: VLS: Lindhorst (buses only); GVH: D (VLS transitional tariff, monthly passes only)

Services
Preceding station	Hanover S-Bahn	Following station
Stadthagen towards Minden (Westfalen)	S 1	Haste (Han) towards Haste (Han) via Hannover Hbf
Location

Lindhorst (Schaumb-Lippe) is a railway station located in Lindhorst, Germany. The station is located on the Hannover to Minden railway. The train services are operated by Deutsche Bahn as part of the Hanover S-Bahn. Lindhorst is served by the S1.

== Train services ==
The following services currently call at Lindhorst:
