= Seelze station =

Railway station in Seelze, Germany

Seelze
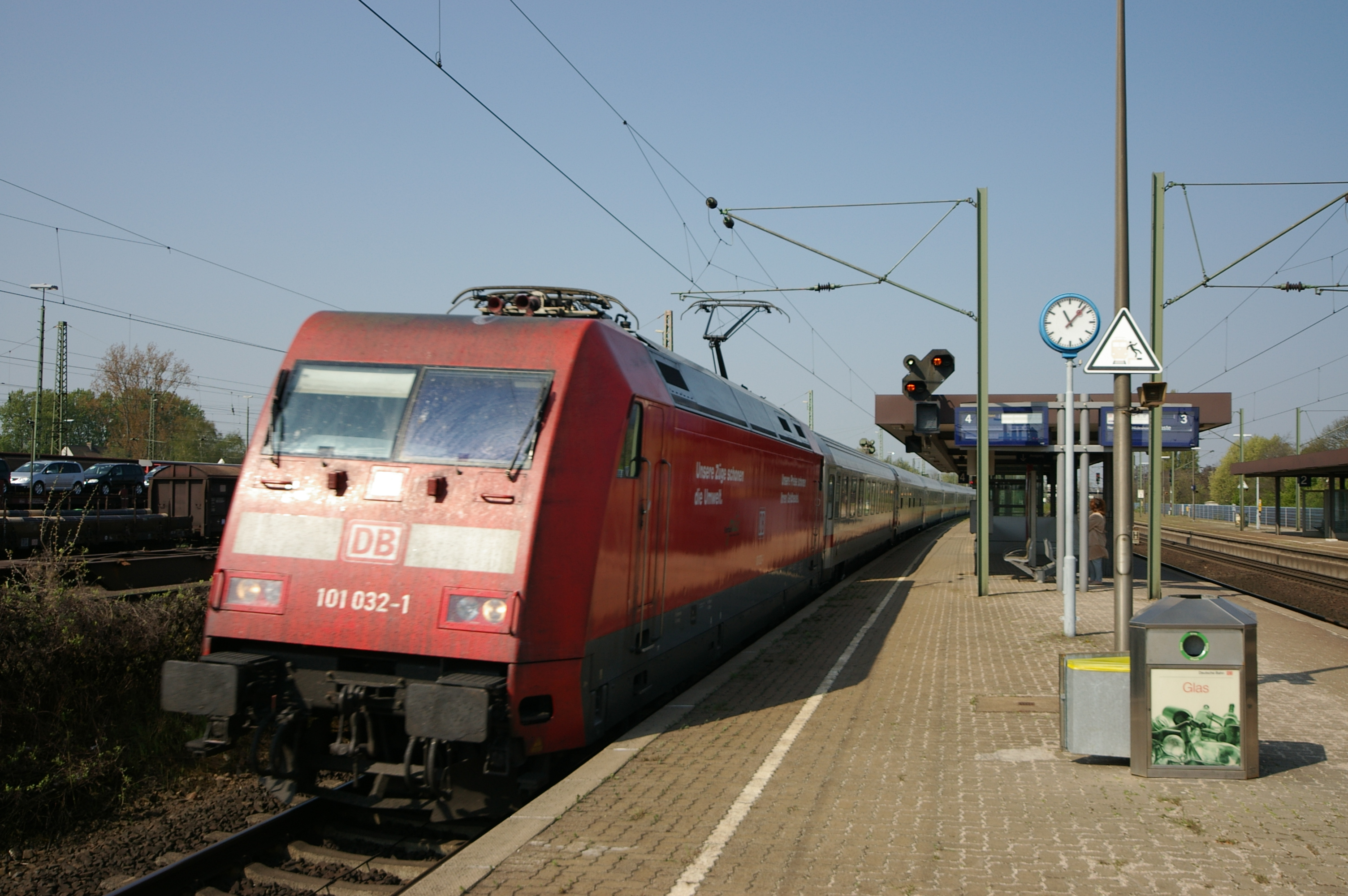
- Seelze station in 2005

General information
- Location: Seelze; Lower Saxony; Germany
- Coordinates: 52°23′31″N 9°35′38″E
- Owner: DB Netz
- Operator: DB Station&Service
- Line: Hanover–Minden railway
- Platforms: 4 (2 in use)
- Tracks: 4
- Train operators: Hanover S-Bahn

Other information
- Station code: 5795
- Category: 4
- Fare zone: GVH: B
- Website: bahnhof.de

History
- Opened: 1847

Services
Preceding station	Hanover S-Bahn	Following station
Dedensen-Gümmer towards Minden (Westfalen)	S 1	Letter towards Haste (Han)
Dedensen-Gümmer towards Nienburg (Weser)	S 2	Letter towards Haste (Han)
Terminus	S 51	Letter towards Hameln
Location

Seelze is a railway station located in Seelze, Germany. The station is located on the Hanover–Minden railway and the Bremen–Hanover railway. The train services are operated by Deutsche Bahn as part of the Hanover S-Bahn. Seelze is served by the S1 and S2.
