= Haste, Germany =

- Municipality
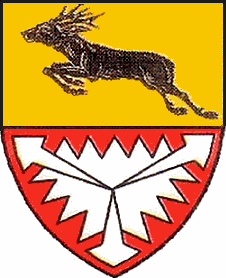
- Coat of arms

- Location of Haste, Germany within Schaumburg district
- Interactive map of Haste, Germany
- Location within Germany Location within Lower Saxony
- Coordinates: 52°23′N 9°23′E
- Country: Germany
- State: Lower Saxony
- District: Schaumburg
- Municipal assoc.: Nenndorf

Government
  - Mayor: Sigmar Sandmann (SPD)

Area
  - Total: 11.13 km^{2} (4.30 sq mi)
- Elevation: 44–55 m (144–180 ft)

Population (2025-12-31)
  - Total: 2,791
  - Density: 250.8/km^{2} (649.5/sq mi)
- Time zone: UTC+01:00 (CET)
  - Summer (DST): UTC+02:00 (CEST)
- Postal codes: 31559
- Dialling codes: 05723
- Vehicle registration: SHG
- Website: www.haste.de

Haste is a municipality in the district of Schaumburg, in Lower Saxony, Germany.
