= Wunstorf–Bremen railway line =

Railway line in Germany

Wunstorf–Bremen
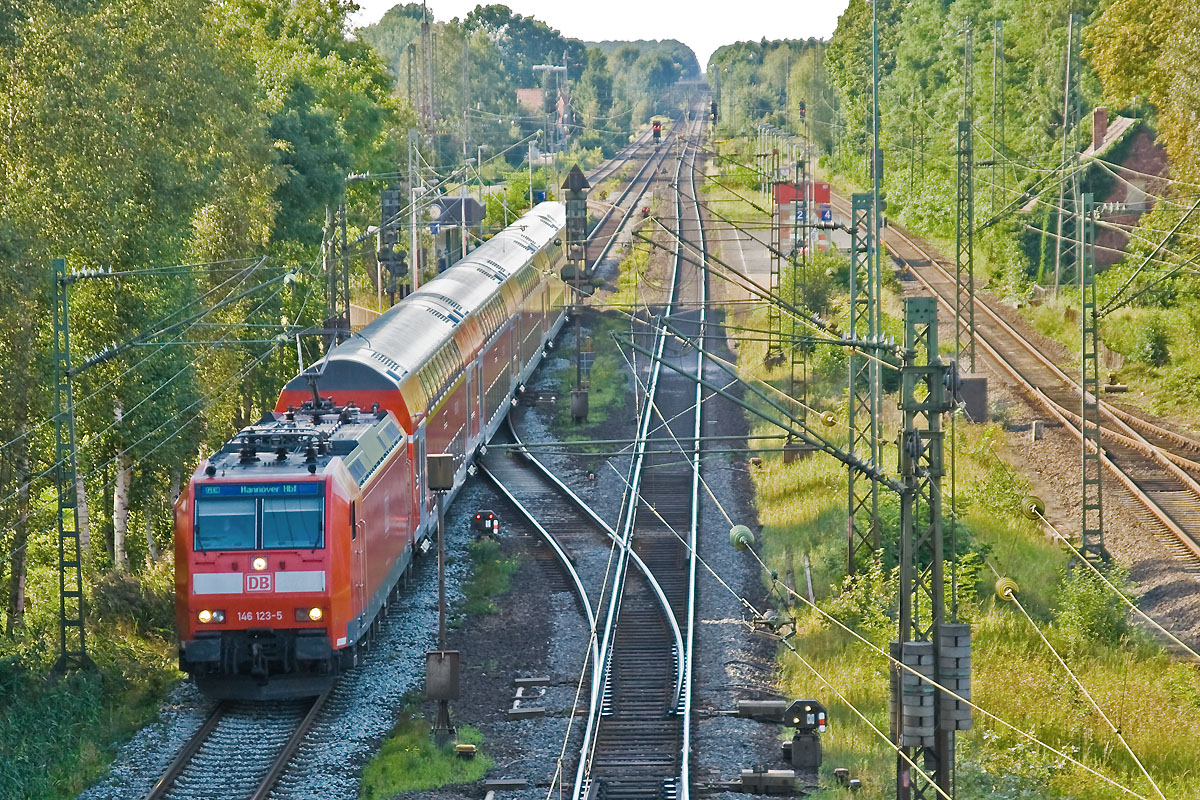
- Regional-Express (RE) Norddeich Mole–Hanover

Overview
- Line number: 1740
- Locale: Lower Saxony and Bremen, Germany

Service
- Route number: 380

Technical
- Line length: 122.3 km (76.0 mi)
- Number of tracks: 2
- Track gauge: 1,435 mm (4 ft 8 1/2 in) standard gauge
- Electrification: 15 kV/16.7 Hz AC catenary
- Operating speed: 160 km/h (99 mph) (max)
- Maximum incline: < 2.0%

The Wunstorf–Bremen railway line is one of the most important lines in the German state of Lower Saxony. It connects the port city of Bremen via Verden an der Aller and Nienburg to Wunstorf, where it connects with the line to Hanover. The 122.3-kilometre-long (76.0 mi), twin-track main line is continuously electrified. The maximum speed is 160 kilometres per hour (99 mph), the maximum axle load is 22.5 tonnes (50,000 lb) and the line is rated as class D4 (the highest class) in the German system of track classification. It was opened on in 1847.

== History ==
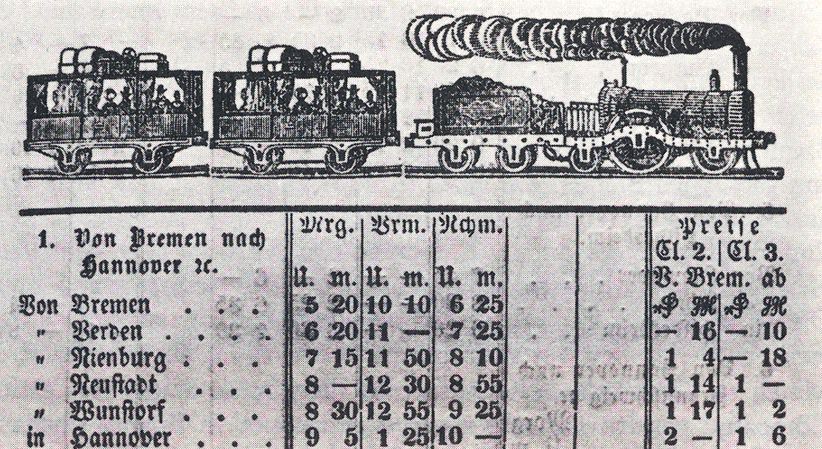
1854 Bremen–Hanover timetable

The Bremen–Hanover line was built as a branch of the Hanover-Minden railway jointly by Royal Hanoverian State Railways and Bremen State Railway and opened on 15 October 1847. Contrary to Prussian wishes, the line did not begin in the Prussian border town of Minden but instead ran from the Hanoverian town of Wunstorf. Following its opening on 12 December 1847, the Wunstorf–Bremen line proved to be one of the most important railway lines in Germany, as it linked the port of Bremen and Lower Saxony to the factories of southern Germany.

It connects with the Bremen-Bremerhaven line (opened in 1862 and extended to Cuxhaven in 1899) and the Oldenburg–Bremen railway line (opened in July 1867 and extended to Wilhelmshaven in September 1867 and to Emden in 1869).

It connects with the America Line to Stendal and the Weser-Aller Railway to Minden and Rotenburg an der Wümme. Several branch connect (or once connected with the line: from Wunstorf to Stolzenau (the Steinhuder Meer Railway); from Nienburg to Uchte and Sulingen; from Eystrup via Hoya and Bruchhausen-Vilsen to Syke (Verkehrsbetriebe Grafschaft Hoya); and from Verden an der Aller via Schwarmstedt to Celle (Aller Valley Railway) and to Walsrode (Verden–Walsrode Railway).

== Rail services ==
The route is as mixed traffic route that is heavily frequented by both passenger and freight trains. There is a controversial proposal to construct a high speed Y-line connecting Hanover to Hamburg and Bremen, which would somewhat reduce passenger train times and create greater capacity for freight. All passenger services are provided by Deutsche Bahn.

=== Passengers ===
Passenger services operate between Bremen and Hanover on Intercity-Express (ICE) run line 25 between Bremen and Munich and on Intercity (IC) line 56 between Oldenburg and Leipzig every two hours during most of the day. ICE trains stop only at Bremen and Hanover Hauptbahnhofs. Some ICE trains operate to or from Oldenburg. The InterCity trains (which run in the hours when the ICE services do not run) stop at Verden and Nienburg. One IC service each day continues to Emden or Norddeich Mole.

=== Regional ===
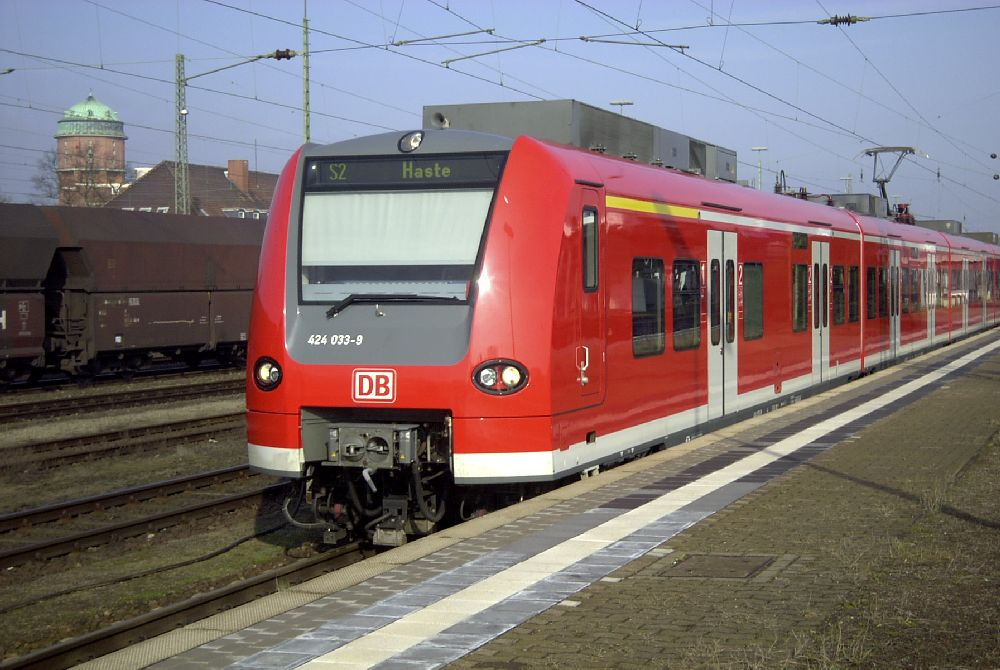
Hanover S-Bahn train at Nienburg

Regional-Express (RE) trains of line RE1 and RE8 run alternately every two hours on the route between Hanover and Bremerhaven and on the route between Hanover and Norddeich Mole, so that between Hanover and Bremen it runs hourly. The trains stop in Wunstorf, Neustadt am Rübenberge, Nienburg, Eystrup, Dörverden, Verden an der Aller, Achim, Bremen-Sebaldsbrück (some trains) and Bremen Hauptbahnhof. These services are operated by DB class146.1 (TRAXX) trains at speeds up to 160 km/h hauling five (Bremen–Hanover) or six (Norddeich Mole–Hanover) carriages. Booster trains run between Nienburg and Hanover during peak travel times.

In December 2011 Regio-S-Bahn Bremen/Niedersachsen was introduced between Verden and Bremen, replacing Regionalbahn (RB) trains.

Also in December 2011 erixx replaced RB trains on the America line, now offering service between Uelzen and Bremen at 2 hour intervals. These trains only call at Langwedel and Achim on the Bremen–Hanover line.

In suburban Hanover services are provided by the Hanover S-Bahn. S-Bahn trains run between Hanover and Seelze on separate tracks. Line S1 runs between Minden, Hanover and Haste and S2 between Nienburg, Hanover and Haste, each running hourly, thus providing a service every 30 minutes on the common section between Wunstorf and Hanover.

Also in suburban Hanover Regional-Express (RE) trains of line RE60 Minden to Brunswick offer services between Wunstorf and Hanover.

=== Freight traffic ===
Regular container trains run on the line to and from Bremerhaven. The Seelze marshalling in Hanover yard is a major node for rail freight transport in northern Germany. Between Seelze and Wunstorf freight trains use a separate freight line. Additional freight trains run between Verden and Nienburg running on the Weser-Aller Railway between Hamburg and Minden.
