= Bremerhaven-Lehe station =

Railway station in Lehe, Germany

Coordinates: 53.5662°N 8.6007°E

Bremerhaven Lehe
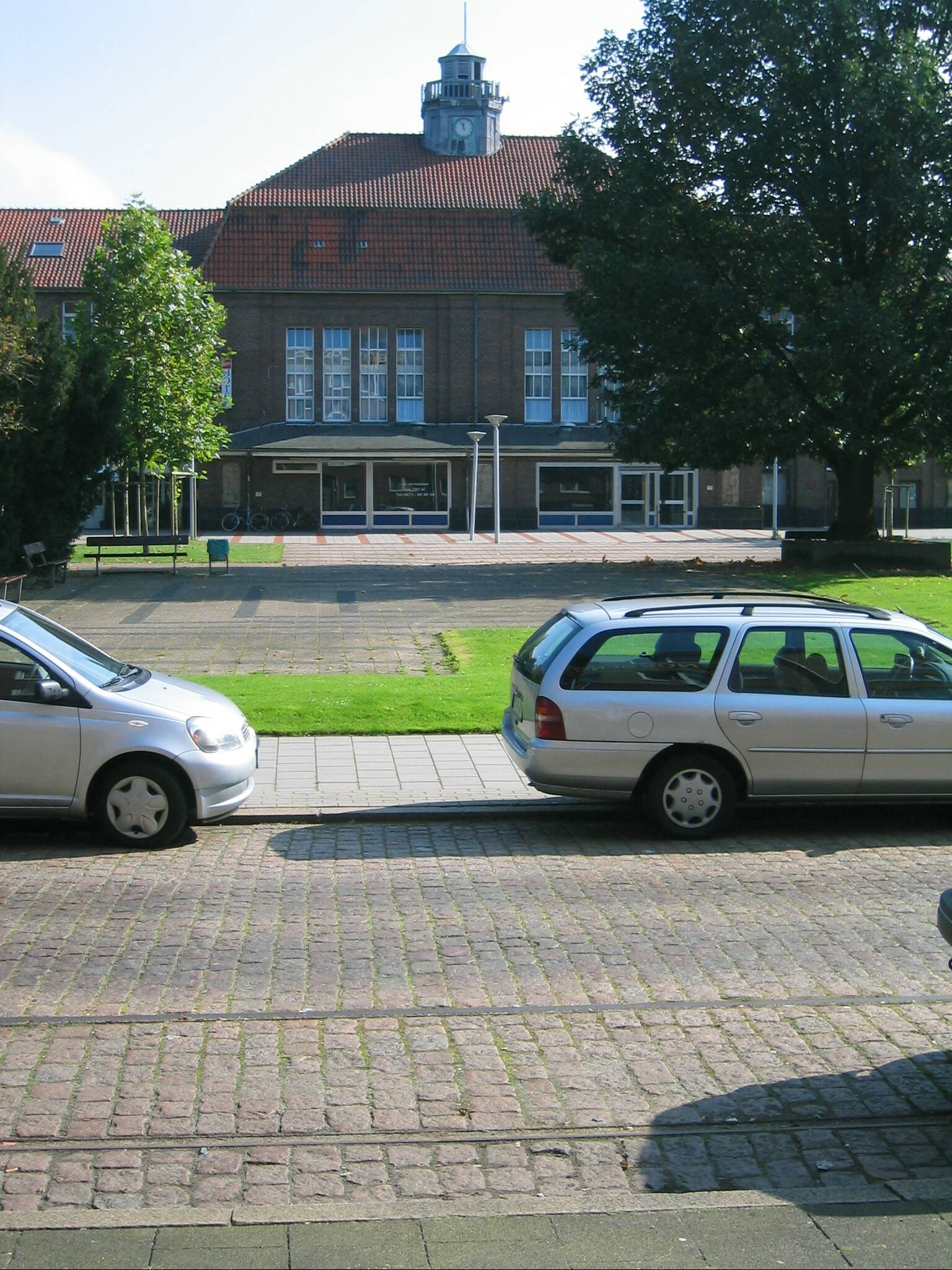

General information
- Location: Bremerhaven, Bremen; Germany
- Owner: Deutsche Bahn
- Operator: DB Netz; DB Station&Service
- Line: Bremen–Bremerhaven line
- Platforms: 1 island platform
- Tracks: 4
- Connections: 507 508 554 E12 E19 E22

Other information
- Station code: 870
- DS100 code: HBHL
- IBNR: 8001168
- Category: 5
- Fare zone: VBN: 250
- Website: www.bahnhof.de

History
- Opened: 1863

Services
Preceding station	DB Regio Nord	Following station
Terminus	RE 8	Bremerhaven Hbf towards Hannover Hbf
Terminus	RE 9	Bremerhaven Hbf towards Osnabrück Hbf
Preceding station	EVB	Following station
Wremen towards Cuxhaven	RB 33	Bremerhaven Hbf towards Buxtehude
Preceding station	Bremen S-Bahn	Following station
Terminus	RS2	Bremerhaven Hbf towards Twistringen
Preceding station	Museumsbahn Bremerhaven-Bederkesa	Following station
Bad Bederkesa Terminus	Bremerhaven–Bederkesa	Bremerhaven Hbf Terminus
Location

Bremerhaven-Lehe is a railway station in the Lehe district of the city of Bremerhaven, Germany.

== History ==
The station was opened in 1863 as an extension of the Bremen-Geestemünde line. In 1896, the line to Cuxhaven was opened. The station has undergone renovations in the early 2000s and is now equipped with a lift.

== Operations ==
The RegionalExpress trains to and from Osnabrück Hbf and Hannover Hbf call at the station. Furthermore, Bremerhaven-Lehe is the terminal and starting point for the Bremen S-Bahn connection to Bremen and Twistringen. Services to Cuxhaven and Buxtehude, operated by EVB, call at the station as well. The Bremerhaven-Lehe marshalling yard (code HBHLA) is nearby. The next station to the south is Bremerhaven Hauptbahnhof (HBH), to the north lies the closed station Bremerhaven-Speckenbüttel (HBHP), the next passenger station still in use is Wremen (AWRE) on the line to Cuxhaven. Connections to local traffic are provided by a bus stop (operated by BremerhavenBus) in front of the station. The old station building has been rented out to two tenants, a hotel on the upper floors and an Aldi supermarket on the ticket hall floor. Access to the station is provided by a passenger tunnel underneath the platforms.

== Train services ==
The following services currently call at the station:

- Regional services RE 8 Bremerhaven-Lehe - Bremen - Nienburg - Hanover
- Regional services RE 9 Bremerhaven-Lehe - Bremen - Osnabrück
- Local services RB 33 Cuxhaven - Dorum - Bremerhaven - Bremervörde - Buxtehude
- Bremen S-Bahn services RS2 Bremerhaven-Lehe - Osterholz-Scharmbeck - Bremen - Twistringen
