= Hanover–Minden railway =

Railway line in Germany

Hannover–Minden
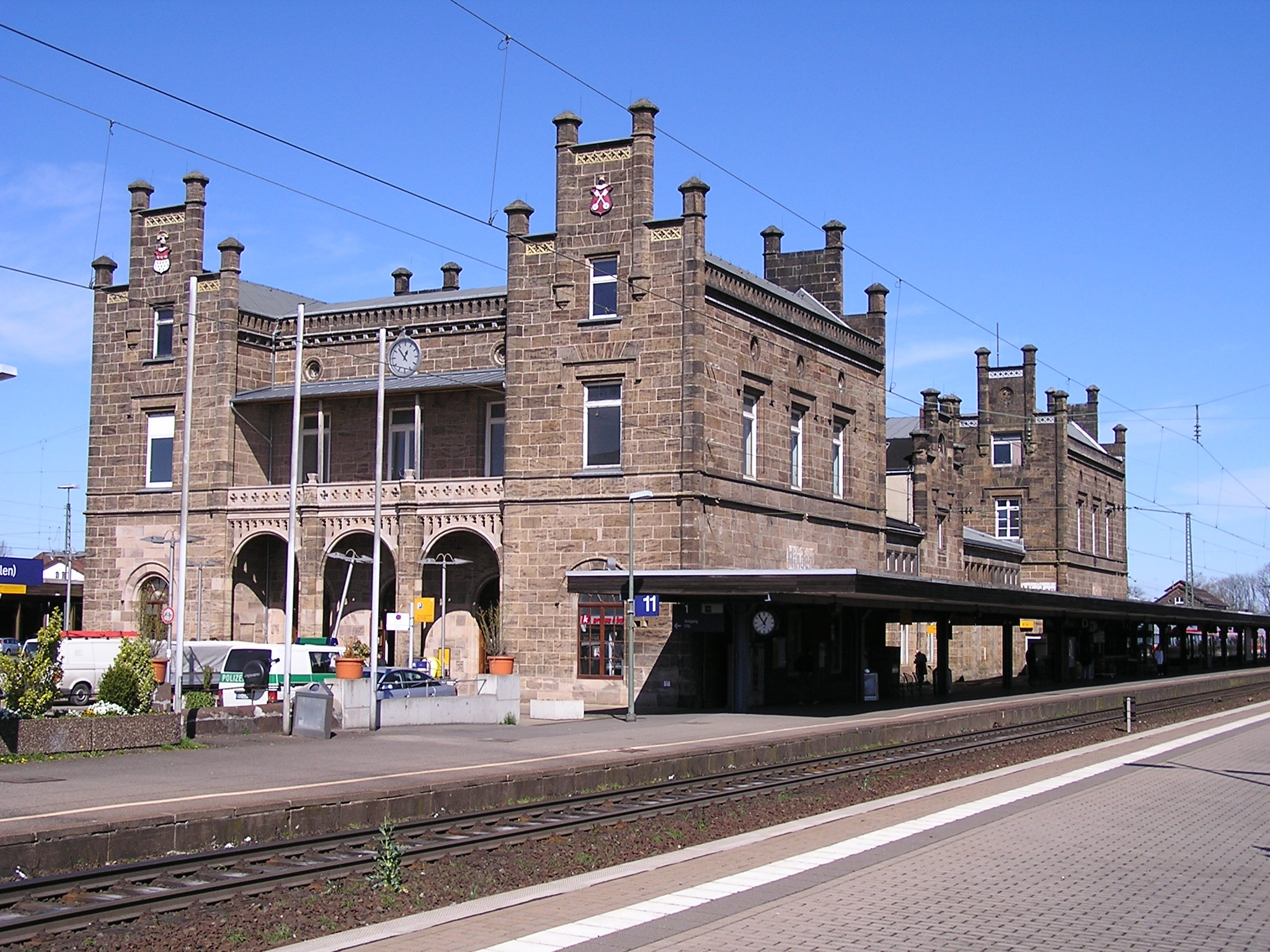
- Minden Station

Overview
- Line number: 1700
- Locale: Lower Saxony, Germany

Service
- Route number: 370

Technical
- Line length: 64.4 km (40.0 mi)
- Number of tracks: 2
- Track gauge: 1,435 mm (4 ft 8 1/2 in) standard gauge
- Electrification: 15 kV/16.7 Hz AC overhead catenary
- Operating speed: 200 km/h (124.3 mph) 70 (maximum)

The Hanover–Minden railway is one of the most important railways in Lower Saxony and railway in Germany. It connects the capital of Lower Saxony, Hanover via Wunstorf, Stadthagen and Bückeburg with Minden, Osnabrück, Amsterdam and the Ruhr.

== History ==
The line was opened on 15 October 1847 by the Royal Hanoverian State Railways. It opened up the Principality of Schaumburg-Lippe, including its capital city, Bückeburg and provided a continuous link between Hanover and the Rhineland. On 23 December 1847, a branch was opened from Wunstorf to Bremen, which has ever since formed one of the main railway of Germany because it connects Bremen with southern industries. More connections and access routes are (or were) provided by the Stadthagen–Stolzenau Railway, the Weser–Aller Railway to Rotenburg an der Wümme, the Cologne-Minden trunk line, which continues the line to the Rhineland, the Rinteln–Stadthagen Railway, the Minden District Railway and the Bad Eilsen Light Railway from Bückeburg to Bad Eilsen and briefly via Meissen to Minden.

=== Development of high-speed railway ===
The first Federal Transport Infrastructure Plan (1973) identified the Dortmund–Hannover–Brunswick line as one of eight railway development projects. In 1984, a 23.5 kilometre section between Bückeburg and Haste was cleared for scheduled speeds of 200 km/h. In 1985, a 13.0 kilometre stretch between Hanover and Wunstorf followed.

== Rail services ==
The whole line is continuously electrified and served by Intercity-Express, InterCity, Regional-Express and S-Bahn services. In addition, there is heavy freight traffic. Between Minden and Hanover hourly RE trains run (Braunschweig to Bielefeld or Rheine) as doubledeck sets and S-Bahn line S1 (Haste–Hannover–Minden). On the Wunstorf–Hanover section, services are supplemented by line S2 (Haste–Hanover–Nienburg). This route is also served by RE trains on the Hanover–Bremen–Norddeich route.

The line has six tracks between Hannover-Nordstadt and Seelze, between Hannover Hbf and Hannover-Nordstadt there are separate S-Bahn-tracks and between Seelze and Wunstorf there are four tracks. However, there are only two tracks on the Wunstorf–Minden section. Therefore, freight traffic on this section needs to go into sidings from time to time to allow faster passenger trains to pass through.

The provision of four-tracks as already exists on the adjacent Hamm-Minden railway line to the west is planned. However, it is still being debated as whether the existing line will be rebuilt, or whether a new high-speed line will be built between Haste and Seelze, bypassing Wunstorf, with the line west of Haste being rebuilt on its existing route.

The construction of one or two S-Bahn tracks between Seelze and Wunstorf by the Hanover region is also under discussion.
