= Haste (Han) station =

Railway station in Haste, Germany

Haste (Han)
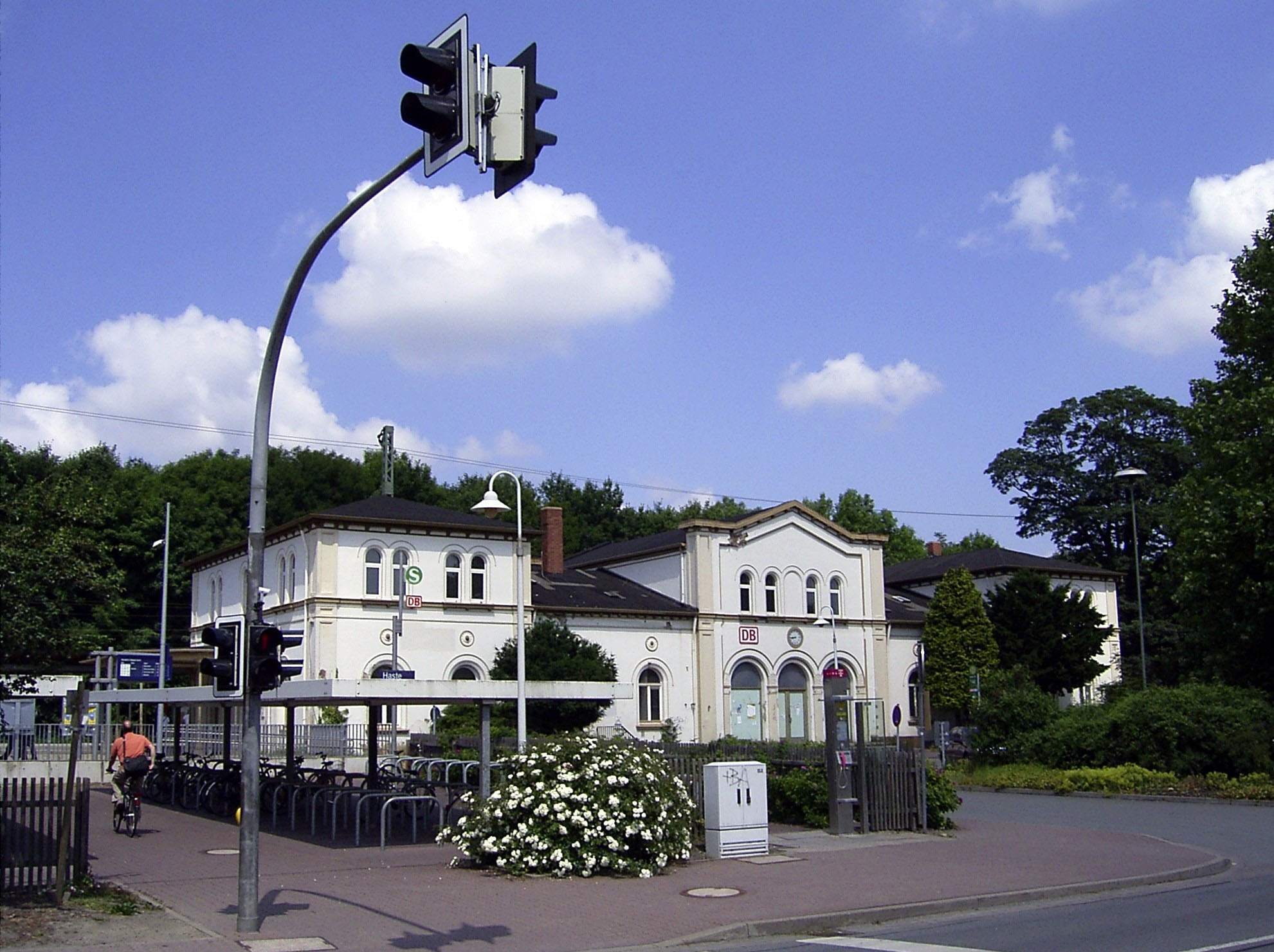
- Haste (Han) railway station

General information
- Location: Hauptstr. 26, Haste, Lower Saxony; Germany
- Coordinates: 52°22′45″N 9°23′19″E
- Lines: Hanover–Minden railway; Deister Railway
- Platforms: 4
- Tracks: 4

Other information
- Station code: 2587
- DS100 code: HHAS
- IBNR: 8002634
- Category: 4
- Fare zone: GVH: C; VLS: Hohnhorst, Suthfeld, Haste (buses only)
- Website: www.bahnhof.de

Services
Preceding station		Following station
Stadthagen towards Rheine	RE 60	Wunstorf towards Braunschweig Hbf
Stadthagen towards Bielefeld Hbf	RE 70	Wunstorf towards Braunschweig Hbf
Preceding station	Hanover S-Bahn	Following station
Lindhorst towards Minden (Westfalen)	S 1	Wunstorf towards Haste (Han) via Hannover Hbf
Bad Nenndorf towards Minden (Westfalen) via Hannover Hbf	S 1	Terminus
Bad Nenndorf towards Nienburg (Weser)	S 2	Terminus
Location

Haste is a railway station located in Haste, Germany. The station is located on the Hanover–Minden railway and the Deister Railway. The train services are operated by Deutsche Bahn and WestfalenBahn. The station is also served by the Hanover S-Bahn.

The S1 service operates a circle through Hannover and finishes here. The service also calls here when operating from Hannover out to Minden.

== Train services ==
The station is served by the following services:

- Regional services RE 60 Rheine - Osnabrück - Minden - Hanover - Braunschweig
- Regional services RE 70 Bielefeld - Herford - Minden - Hanover - Braunschweig
- Hannover S-Bahn services S 1 Minden - Haste - Wunstorf - Hanover - Weetzen - Haste
- Hannover S-Bahn services S 2 Nienburg - Wunstorf - Hanover - Weetzen - Haste
