= Einbeck-Salzderhelden station =

Railway station in Einbeck, Germany

Einbeck-Salzderhelden
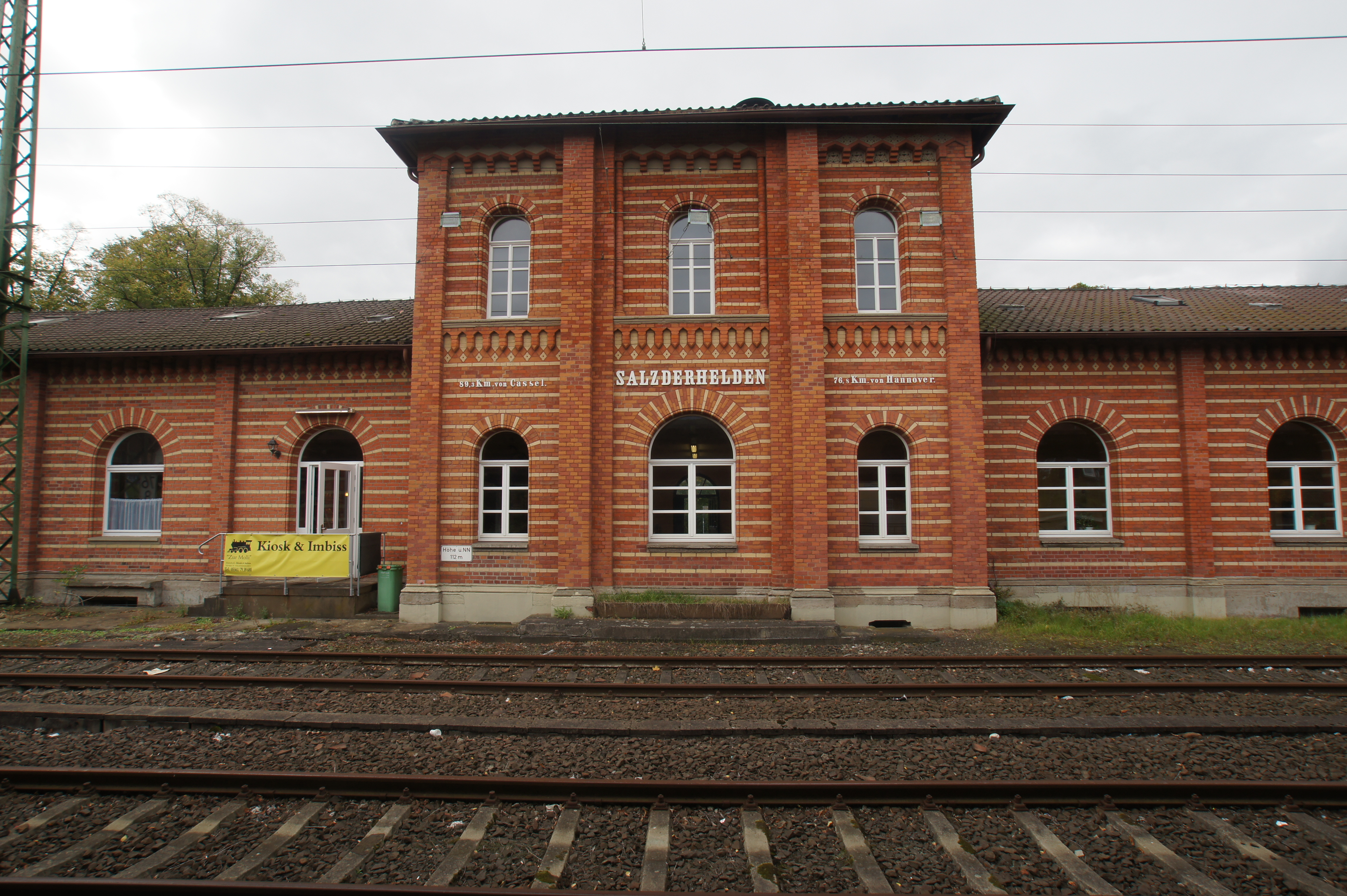
- Entrance building and tracks

General information
- Location: Bahnhofstr. 8, Einbeck, Lower Saxony; Germany
- Coordinates: 51°47′54″N 9°55′22″E
- Lines: Hanoverian Southern Railway (km 76.8) (KBS 350); Ilme Railway (km 0.0) (currently only freight and special trains)
- Platforms: 3

Construction
- Accessible: Yes
- Architect: Conrad Wilhelm Hase

Other information
- Station code: 1520
- DS100 code: HEB
- IBNR: 8005264
- Category: 4
- Fare zone: VSN: 450
- Website: www.bahnhof.de

History
- Opened: 1 August 1854
- Former names: Salzderhelden (until 1974); Einbeck (1974–1994)

Services
Preceding station	Metronom	Following station
Northeim (Han) towards Göttingen	RE 2	Kreiensen towards Uelzen
Preceding station	DB Regio Nord	Following station
Northeim (Han) towards Göttingen	RB 82	Kreiensen towards Bad Harzburg
Northeim (Han) towards Göttingen	RB 86	Einbeck Mitte Terminus
Location
- Location within Lower Saxony

Einbeck-Salzderhelden station is the most important station in Einbeck in the German state of Lower Saxony. It is classified by Deutsche Bahn as a category 5 station and is located in the district of Einbeck of Salzderhelden.

== History ==
The section from Alfeld via Kreiensen and Northeim to Göttingen on the old North–South railway was connected to the railway network on 31 July 1854. The station of the then independent municipality of Salzderhelden was opened only one day later, on 1 August 1854. The station building was built according to the plans of Conrad Wilhelm Hase.

The line from Salzderhelden to Einbeck (now Einbeck Mitte) was opened on 10 September 1879, turning it into a junction station.

All transport operations on the Salzderhelden–Einbeck line were taken over by the Ilmebahn (Ilme Railway) from Deutsche Bundesbahn in 1954. Passenger services on the line were discontinued by 1975 and replaced by bus route 230.

Salzderhelden was incorporated into the municipality of Einbeck on 1 March 1974. The station was renamed Einbeck in 1978 and the former Einbeck station was renamed Einbeck Mitte. Until 2002, the track of the Ilme Railway still existed as far as Dassel and it was then gradually dismantled back to Juliusmühle. In the same year, the Einbeck-Salzderhelden – Einbeck Mitte line was transferred from DB to Ilmebahn GmbH. The station has been called Einbeck-Salzderhelden since 1994.

== Transport services ==
=== Rail services ===
Salzderhelden is located on the Hanoverian Southern Railway and it has been served approximately hourly since December 2005 by a Regional-Express service, RE 2, operated by Metronom Eisenbahngesellschaft and connecting with Göttingen, Kreiensen and Hanover.

The line to Einbeck has not been regularly used by passenger services since 1984, but it is occasionally used by special passenger trains and by freight traffic.

Line	Route	Interval	Operator
RE 2	Uelzen – Celle – Hannover Hbf – Kreiensen – Einbeck-Salzderhelden – Northeim(Han) – Göttingen	60	Metronom
RB 82	Bad Harzburg – Goslar – Langelsheim – Seesen – Kreiensen – Einbeck-Salzderhelden – Northeim (Han) – Göttingen	120	DB Regio Nord
RB	Einbeck-Salzderhelden – Einbeck Mitte	Individual services	Ilmebahn GmbH

=== Bus services ===
Einbeck is now connected to Einbeck-Salzderhelden station by bus route 230, which operates on the Einbeck–Salzderhelden–Northeim route.

All bus and rail services in the Einbeck area are managed by the Verkehrsverbund Süd-Niedersachsen (Southern Lower Saxony transport association, VSN).

== Prospects ==
There are efforts to restore regular passenger services on the Einbeck-Salzderhelden – Einbeck Mitte section of the Ilmebahn. The reactivation of this section was found to generate significant economic benefits.

The operation was due to be resumed at the timetable change in December 2017, but it has been delayed until December 2018.
