= Seesen station =

Railway station in Seesen, Germany

Seesen
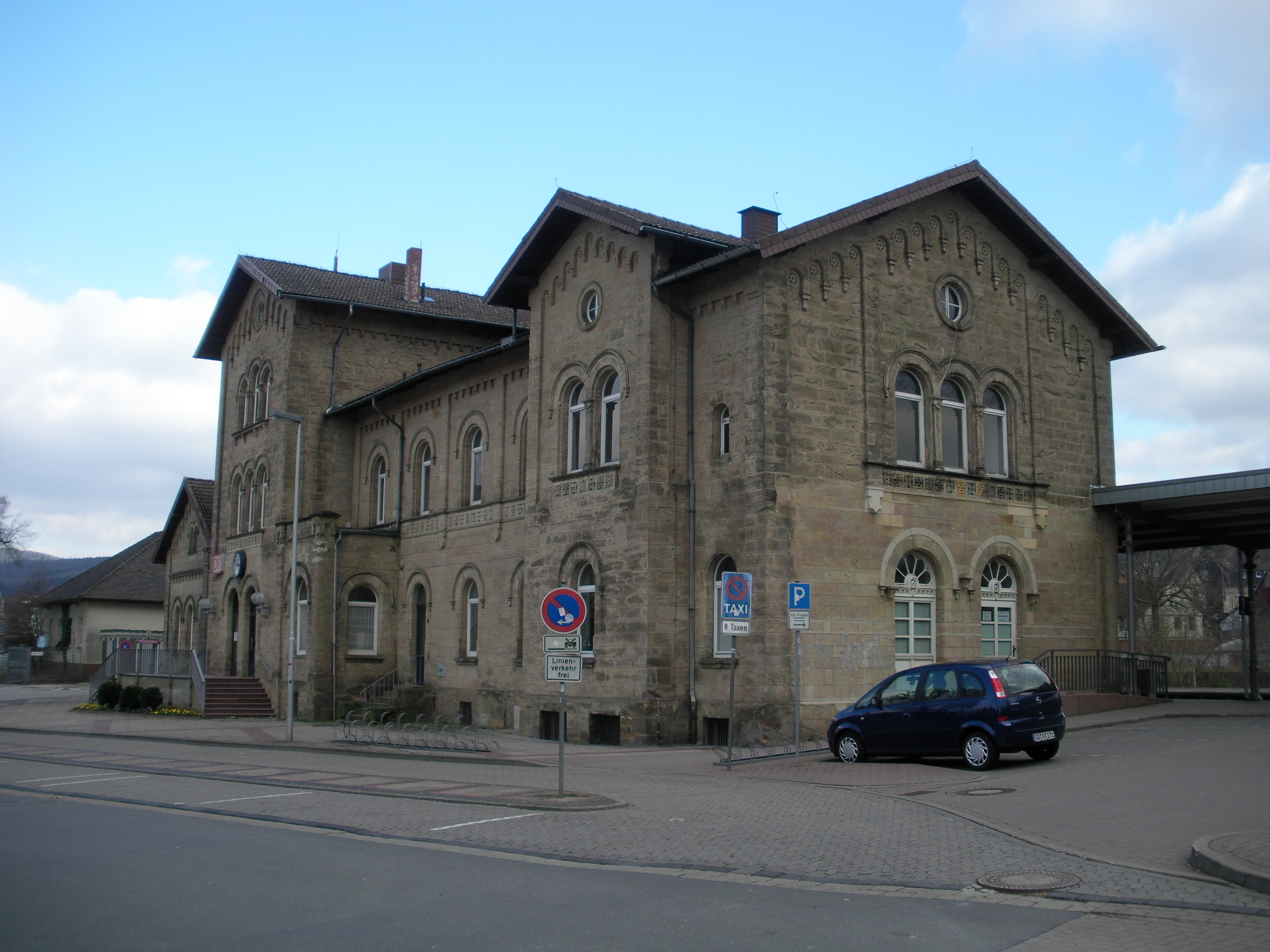
- Entrance building

General information
- Location: Bahnhofstr. 8, Seesen, Lower Saxony; Germany
- Coordinates: 51°53′15″N 10°10′26″E
- Lines: Herzberg–Seesen; Börßum–Kreiensen; Derneburg–Seesen (closed)
- Platforms: 3

Construction
- Architect: Conrad Wilhelm Hase

Other information
- Station code: 5797
- DS100 code: HSSN
- IBNR: 8000043
- Category: 5
- Fare zone: VRB: 84; VSN: 84 (VRB transitional tariff)
- Website: www.bahnhof.de

Services
Preceding station	DB Regio Nord	Following station
Münchehof (Harz) towards Herzberg (Harz)	RB 46	Salzgitter-Ringelheim towards Braunschweig Hbf
Bad Gandersheim towards Göttingen	RB 82	Langelsheim towards Bad Harzburg
Location
- Location within Lower Saxony

Seesen station is the largest station in the town of Seesen in the German state of Lower Saxony. Münchehof (Harz) station also still serves the municipality.

It has three platform edges with a length of 140 metres each and a height of 55 centimetres. The station was made barrier-free under the project Niedersachsen ist am Zug II ("Lower Saxony is on the train II") for about €2.6 million: lifts were installed on platform 1 and on the island platform with tracks 2 and 4. Each platform has a dynamic train indicator that informs about delays and other deviations from the timetable. The old freight yard in Seesen is no longer used and has been abandoned. The tracks that were no longer needed for freight transport were removed by 2013. Track 3 of the passenger station had already been dismantled.

== Station building ==
The station building is only used to a limited extent and is now privately owned. In addition to the waiting room, a DB travel agency is also housed in the station building. The Lebenshilfe (a self-help association, which assists the disabled) has leased premises to supply help with housework.

== Railway lines ==
The station is located on the Herzberg–Seesen railway and the Brunswick Southern Railway and thus functions as a junction station. The Seesen–Derneburg railway was decommissioned on 1 January 1996 and partially dismantled. In 2013, plans were made to reactivate the line, but the plans were quickly rejected, as the reactivation would have become uneconomic due to the fact that large parts of the roadbed have been developed as cycle paths.

== Rail services ==
The station is served by the following services:

Line	Route	Interval	Operator
RB 82	Göttingen – Northeim – Kreiensen – Seesen – Langelsheim – Goslar – Bad Harzburg	Every two hours	DB Regio Nord
RB 82	Kreiensen – Seesen – Langelsheim – Goslar – Bad Harzburg	Every two hours (Mon–Fri)	DB Regio Nord
RB 46	Herzberg (Harz) – Münchehof (Harz) –Seesen – Salzgitter-Ringelheim – Salzgitter-Bad – Brunswick Hbf	Hourly	DB Regio Nord
