= Salzgitter-Ringelheim station =

Railway station in Salzgitter, Germany

Salzgitter Ringelheim
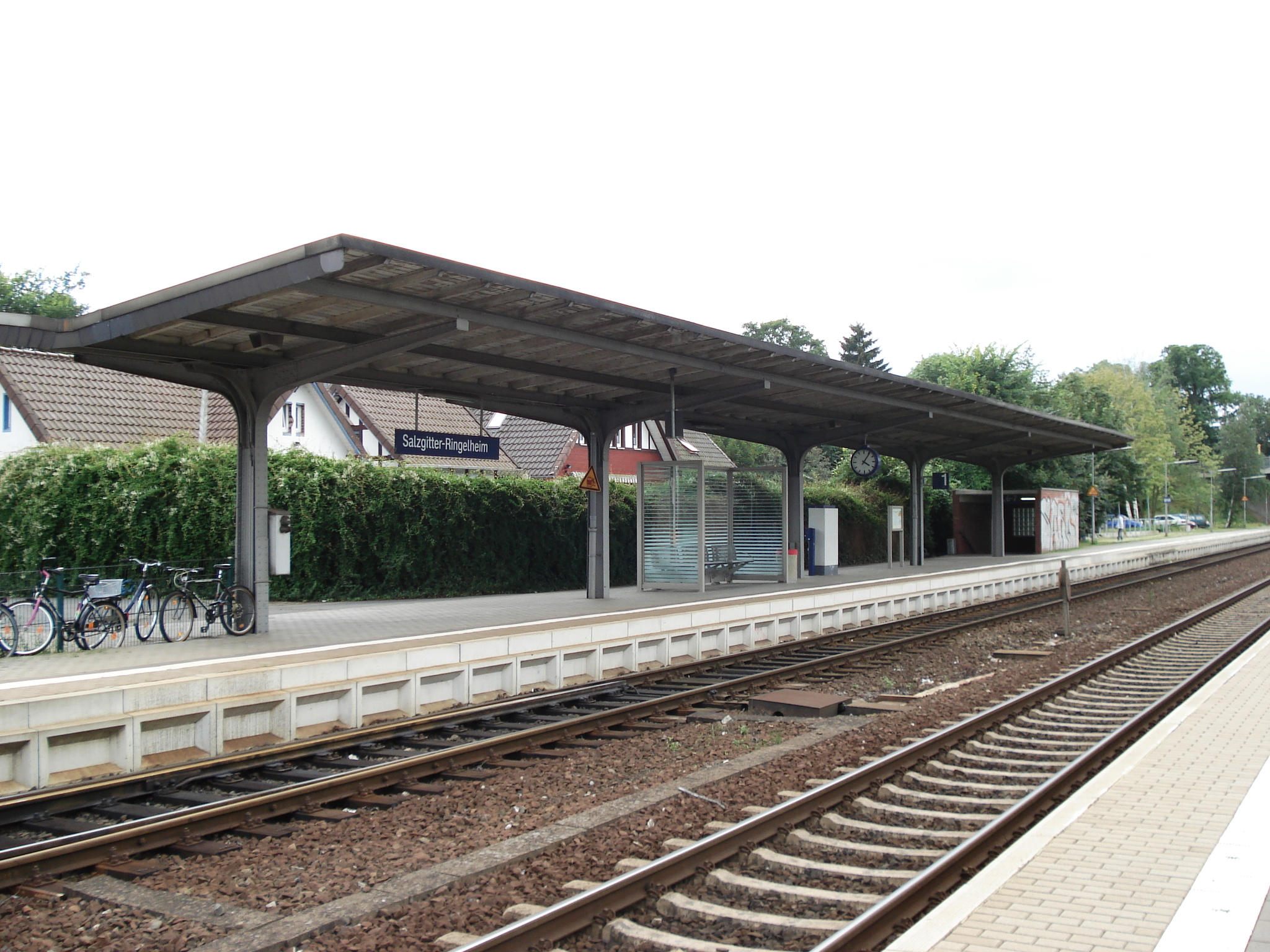

General information
- Location: Salzgitter-Ringelheim, Lower Saxony; Germany
- Coordinates: 52°2′17″N 10°18′52″E
- Owner: DB Netz
- Operator: DB Station&Service
- Lines: Brunswick–Kreiensen (KBS 358); Hildesheim–Goslar (KBS 320)
- Platforms: 4
- Train operators: DB Regio Nord; Erixx

Other information
- Station code: 5481
- DS100 code: HSRI
- Category: 5
- Fare zone: VRB: 60
- Website: www.bahnhof.de

History
- Opened: 1856

Services
Preceding station		Following station
Baddeckenstedt towards Hannover Hbf	RE 10	Goslar towards Bad Harzburg
Preceding station	DB Regio Nord	Following station
Seesen towards Herzberg (Harz)	RB 46	Salzgitter-Bad towards Braunschweig Hbf
Location
- Location within Lower Saxony Location within Germany Location within Europe

Salzgitter-Ringelsheim station is a station in the town of Salzgitter in the German state of Lower Saxony. It is located in the extreme southwest of the urban area in the district of Salzgitter-Ringelheim. Salzgitter has no central station and Salzgitter-Ringelsheim station, despite its remote location, is the main station in Salzgitter.

== Infrastructure ==
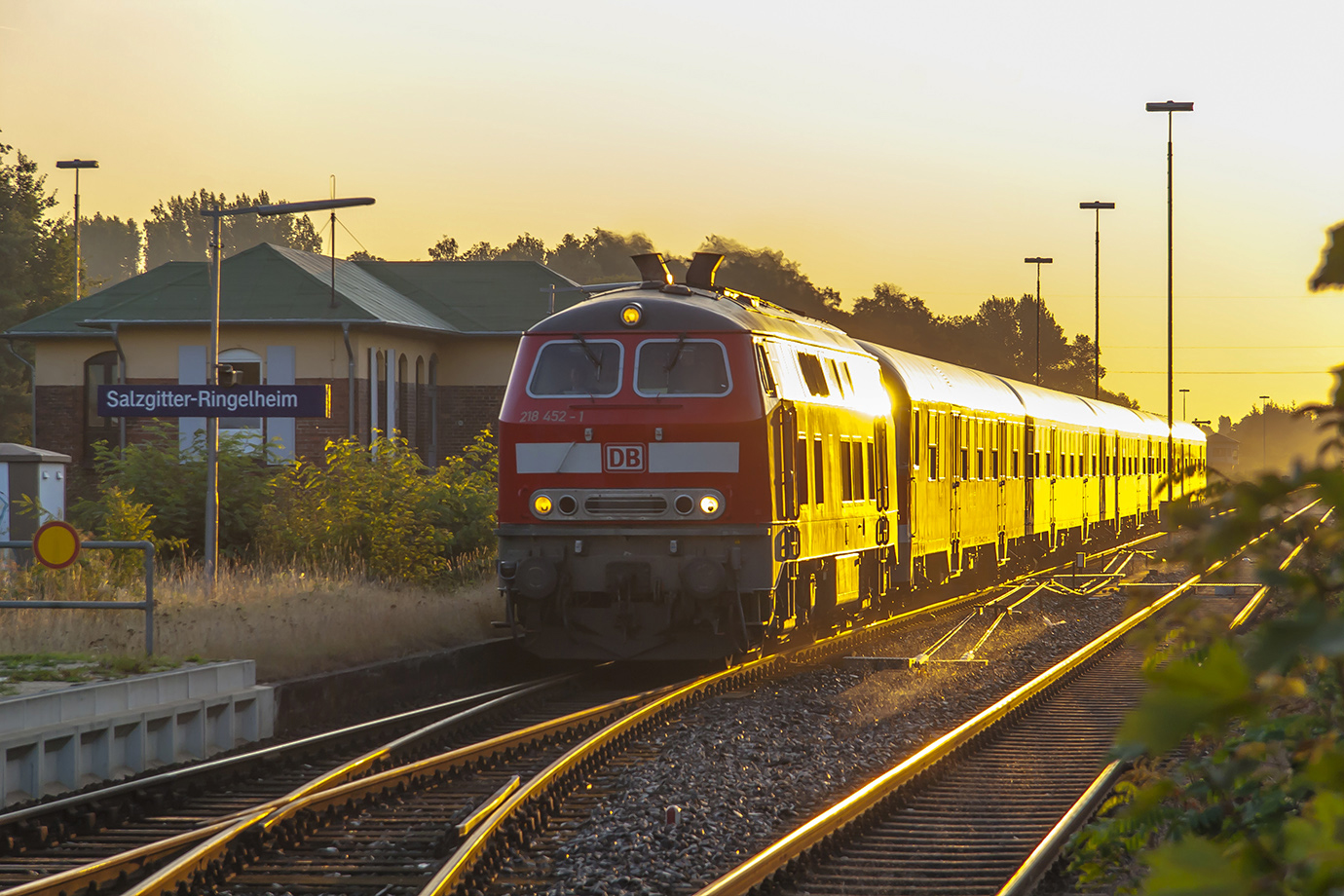
DB Class 218 at Salzgitter-Ringelheim station (2009).

The station is a railway junction, built as the through station lying east-west. The Brunswick–Kreiensen railway and the Hildesheim–Goslar railway, which intersect here, are not electrified. It is served by Regionalbahn and Regional-Express trains. It is classified by Deutsche Bahn as a category 5 station.

== Rail services ==
Line	Route	Frequency
RE 10	Hannover – Hildesheim – Derneburg – Salzgitter-Ringelheim – Goslar – Bad Harzburg (– Halle (Saale))	Hourly
RB 46	Brunswick – Salzgitter-Ringelheim – Seesen – Gittelde – Herzberg (Harz)	Hourly
RB 46	Brunswick – Salzgitter-Ringelheim – Seesen – Bad Gandersheim – Kreiensen	Individual services

== History ==
The Brunswick Southern Railway (Brunswick–Kreiensen railway) was built from Brunswick towards Kreiensen through the south of modern urban area of Salzgitter in 1856, passing through Salzgitter station—now called Salzgitter Bad station—and Ringelheim (Harz). The rail network in the Salzgitter area was extensively remodelled between 1938 and 1958. In Ringelsheim station, the Brunswick–Kreiensen railway crossed the Hildesheim–Grauhof section of the Hildesheim–Goslar railway completed by the Hanover-Altenbeken Railway Company in 1875 to connect with the Halberstadt–Vienenburg railway of the Magdeburg–Halberstadt Railway Company. At this time a station building was built to a Harz design. It was demolished in the late 1980s. Salzgitter Ringelsheim station has been modernised since 2000.
