= Kreiensen station =

Railway station in Einbeck, Germany

Kreiensen
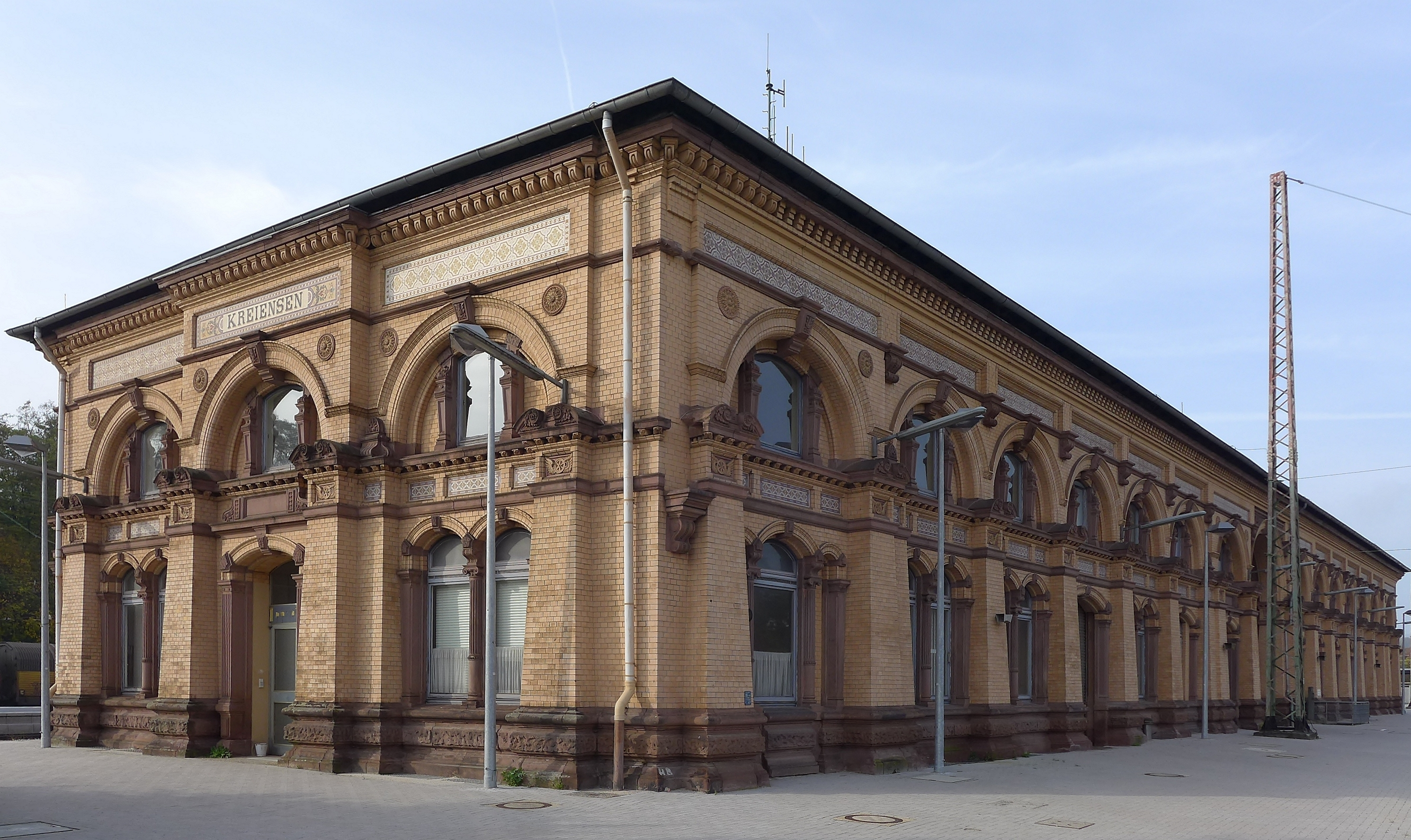
- Entrance building from the east in 2016

General information
- Location: Bahnhof 1, Kreiensen, Lower Saxony; Germany
- Coordinates: 51°51′04″N 9°58′04″E
- Lines: Hanoverian Southern Railway (km 78.8) (KBS 350); Altenbeken–Kreiensen railway (KBS 403); Brunswick Southern Railway (KBS 358)

Construction
- Architect: Hubert Stier

Other information
- Station code: 5892
- DS100 code: HK
- IBNR: 8000213
- Category: 4
- Fare zone: VSN: 480
- Website: www.bahnhof.de

History
- Opened: 1854

Services
| Preceding station | Metronom | Following station |
|---|---|---|
| Einbeck-Salzderhelden towards Göttingen | RE 2 | Freden (Leine) towards Uelzen |
| Preceding station | DB Regio Nord | Following station |
| Einbeck-Salzderhelden towards Göttingen | RB 82 | Freden (Leine) towards Bad Harzburg |
| Preceding station | NordWestBahn | Following station |
| Stadtoldendorf towards Paderborn Hbf | RB 84 | Terminus |
Location
- Location within Lower Saxony

Kreiensen station is a Keilbahnhof ("wedge station") in Kreiensen in the German state of Lower Saxony and along with Einbeck-Salzderhelden station one of two stations in the town of Einbeck.

== History ==
The first station in the Duchy of Brunswick was established in Kreiensen in 1854. It consisted of station buildings, outbuildings and goods sheds, as well as an extension with ancillary facilities. It became more congested with the opening of the Altenbeken–Kreiensen railway in 1865. Following the opening of the Brunswick–Bad Harzburg railway of the Duchy of Brunswick and the Vienenburg–Goslar railway in 1866, new construction at the station began in 1886. Reliefs of the Brunswick Lion on the east side and a Prussian eagle on the west side reflect its joint use by Hanover and Brunswick—the Kingdom of Hanover was located directly north and south. Master builder Richard Herzig had 35,000 yellow and red facing bricks and 110,000 common bricks delivered.

Since the tracks divided Kreiensen into two areas, a pedestrian bridge was built. It was designed according to the construction principle of Max Möller with fish-bellied support ribs at spans of 124 m and 58 m.

In 1923, there was a rear-end collision between two trains travelling at night and 47 people were killed. The collision was initially believed to have killed 100.

In 1956, the world's first track-plan signal box was installed by Siemens. It was able to take over the tasks of three old mechanical signal boxes. Two dispatchers each served half of the station, which was only connected on the south side by three tracks. An electronic interlocking that was remotely controlled by the control centre in Hanover was put into operation on 13 November 2011.

The platforms and canopies were renovated in 2014.

== Entrance building ==
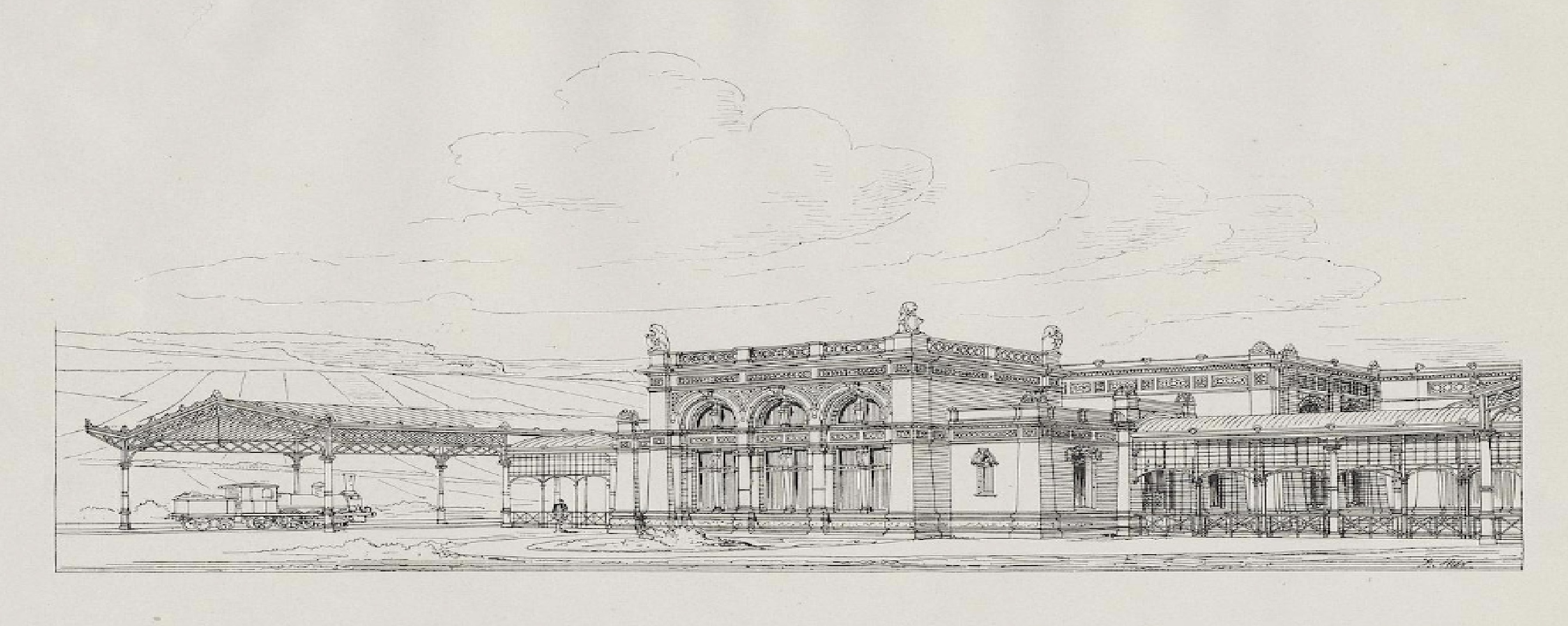
North side of the entrance building, around 1890

The entrance building was built for the Hanoverian Southern Railway to plans by Hubert Stier in 1886-89. This building from the Wilhelminist period is a brick building with facades covered by tiles. Other elements of shaped stone are found in arched profiles and cornices. Formal design tools are used sparingly on the facades. The cladding with ochre-coloured ceramic tiles is complemented with pillars covered with various terracotta reliefs. Plinths and cornices are made of sandstone. Due to its external monumentality, the building does not reflect the townscape, but instead stresses its importance as a railway junction. It contains a Fürstenzimmer ("prince's room"), which was the location of a meeting between Otto von Bismarck and Tsar Alexander III of Russia in 1889.

It was due to be sold at auction by DB Station & Service in September 2016.

== Operations ==
The operations include freight and passenger trains. The station is a railway junction. It is served mainly by Deutsche Bahn, NordWestBahn and Metronom Eisenbahngesellschaft. It is used in freight operations by the Ilmebahn for shunting. It is also the location of a bus station of the Verkehrsverbund Süd-Niedersachsen.

| Line | Route | Operator |
|---|---|---|
| ICE 24 (some trains) | Munich – Augsburg – Würzburg – Kassel-Wilhelmshöhe – Göttingen – Kreiensen – Hannover – Lüneburg – Hamburg Hbf – Hamburg-Altona | DB Fernverkehr |
| RE 2 | Uelzen – Celle – Hannover Hbf – Kreiensen – Northeim(Han) – Göttingen | Metronom |
| RB 82 | Bad Harzburg – Goslar – Langelsheim – Seesen – Kreiensen – Northeim (Han) – Göttingen | DB Regio Nord |
| RB 84 | Kreiensen – Holzminden – Bad Driburg(Westf) – Altenbeken (– Paderborn) | NordWestBahn |

In addition, a single train pair operated by DB Regio Nord runs via Bad Gandersheim, Seesen and Salzgitter-Bad to Brunswick Hbf in the morning.
