= Herzberg (Harz) station =

Railway station in Herzberg am Harz, Germany

Herzberg (Harz)
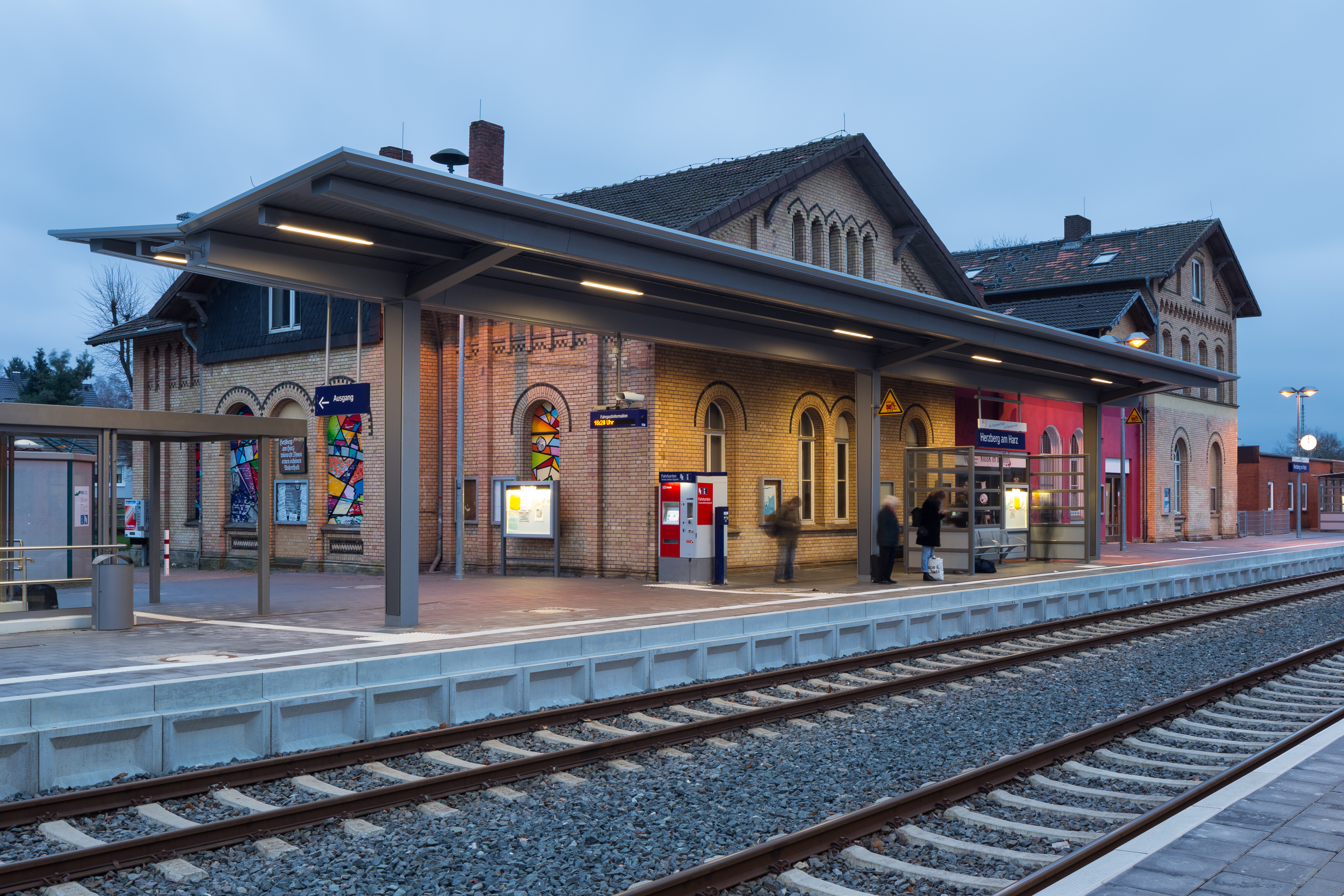
- 2016

General information
- Location: Bahnhofstraße 44; 37412 Herzberg am Harz; Lower Saxony; Germany
- Coordinates: 51.6440°N 10.3301°E
- Elevation: 233 m (764 ft)
- Owner: DB Netz
- Operator: DB Station&Service
- Lines: South Harz Railway (KBS 357); Herzberg–Seesen railway (KBS 358)
- Platforms: 1 island platform 1 side platform
- Tracks: 3
- Train operators: DB Regio Nord

Other information
- Station code: 2740
- DS100 code: HHB
- IBNR: 8000166
- Category: 5
- Fare zone: VSN: 130
- Website: www.bahnhof.de

Services
| Preceding station | DB Regio Nord | Following station |
|---|---|---|
| Terminus | RB 46 | Herzberg Schloß towards Braunschweig Hbf |
| Hattorf towards Göttingen | RB 80 | Bad Lauterberg im Harz Barbis towards Nordhausen |
| Hattorf towards Bodenfelde | RB 81 | Bad Lauterberg im Harz Barbis towards Nordhausen |
Location
- Location within Lower Saxony

Herzberg (Harz) station is a railway station in the municipality of Herzberg am Harz, located in the Göttingen district in Lower Saxony, Germany.
