= Göttingen station =

Railway halt in Göttingen, Germany

Göttingen
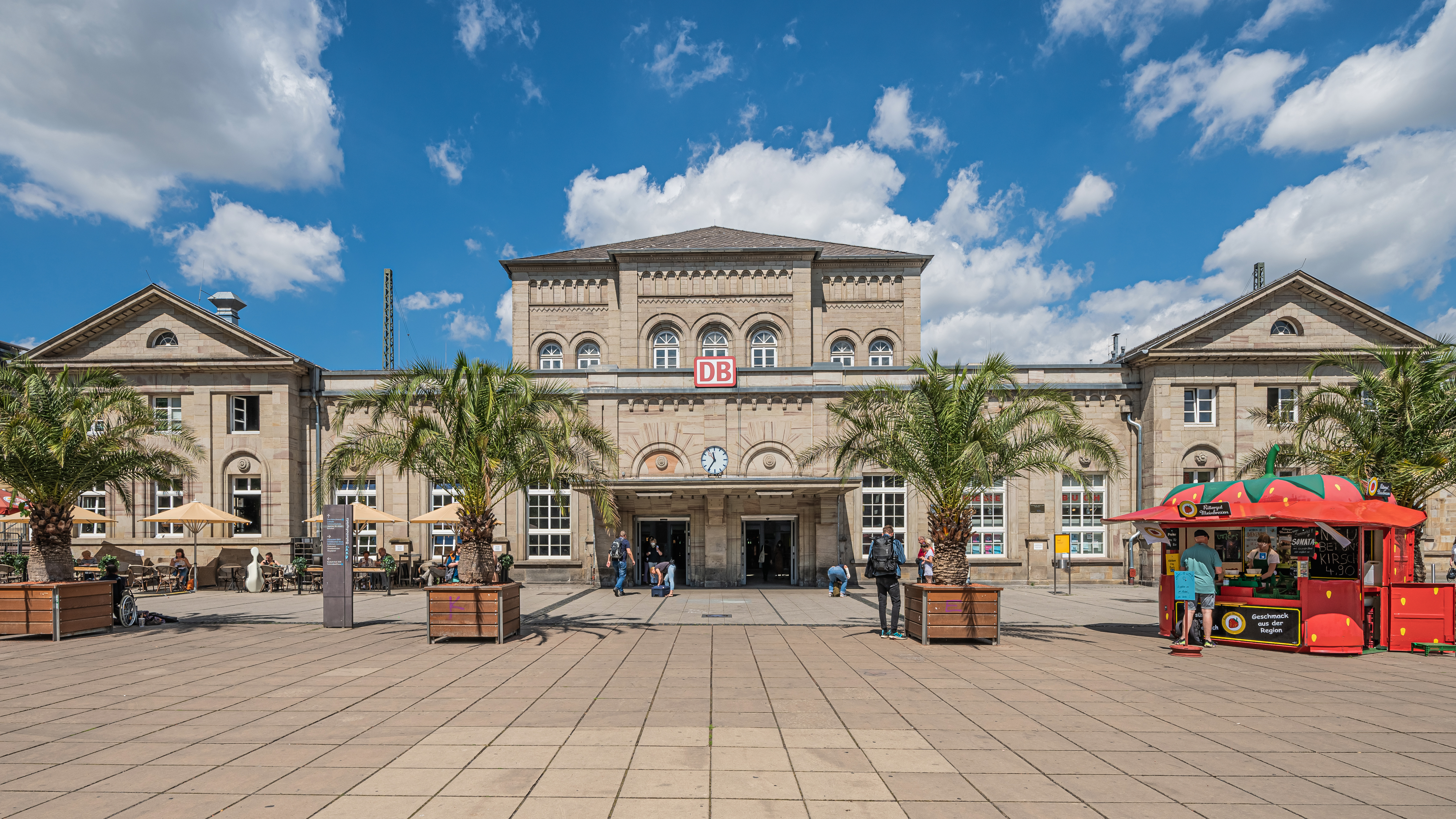
- Station building and station forecourt

General information
- Location: Bahnhofsplatz 1, Göttingen, Lower Saxony; Germany
- Coordinates: 51°32′12″N 9°55′37″E
- Owner: Deutsche Bahn
- Operator: DB Station&Service
- Lines: Hanoverian Southern Railway (KBS 350); Hanover–Würzburg high-speed railway (KBS 351); Göttingen–Bodenfelde railway (KBS 356Süd); South Harz Railway (KBS 357); Halle–Kassel railway (KBS 611); Frankfurt–Göttingen railway (KBS 613)
- Platforms: 8

Construction
- Accessible: Yes
- Architect: Conrad Wilhelm Hase
- Architectural style: Hannoverian Rundbogenstil

Other information
- Station code: 2218
- DS100 code: HG
- IBNR: 8000128
- Category: 2
- Fare zone: VSN: 200
- Website: www.bahnhof.de

History
- Opened: 1854; 172 years ago
Services
Preceding station	DB Fernverkehr	Following station
Kassel-Wilhelmshöhe towards Brig, Chur or Interlaken Ost	ICE 12	Hannover Hbf towards Berlin Ostbahnhof
Kassel-Wilhelmshöhe towards Brig, Chur or Interlaken Ost	ICE 12	Hildesheim Hbf towards Berlin Ostbahnhof
Kassel-Wilhelmshöhe towards Frankfurt Airport, Frankfurt (Main) Hbf, Karlsruhe Hbf or Stuttgart Hbf	ICE 13	Hildesheim Hbf towards Berlin Ostbahnhof
Kassel-Wilhelmshöhe towards Stuttgart Hbf	ICE 16	Hannover Hbf One-way operation
Kassel-Wilhelmshöhe towards Basel SBB	ICE/ECE 20	Hannover Hbf towards Hamburg Hbf
Kassel-Wilhelmshöhe towards Stuttgart Hbf	ICE 22	Hannover Hbf towards Kiel Hbf
Kassel-Wilhelmshöhe towards Innsbruck Hbf or Schwarzach-St. Veit	ICE 24	Hannover Hbf towards Hamburg-Altona
Kassel-Wilhelmshöhe towards Frankfurt (Main) Hbf	ICE 24	Hannover Hbf towards Westerland (Sylt)
Kassel-Wilhelmshöhe towards München Hbf	ICE 25	Hannover Hbf towards Hamburg-Altona
Kassel-Wilhelmshöhe towards Karlsruhe Hbf	ICE 26	Hannover Hbf towards Bremen Hbf
Kassel-Wilhelmshöhe towards Wien Hbf	ICE 91	Hannover Hbf towards Hamburg-Altona
Preceding station	ÖBB	Following station
Würzburg Hbf towards Innsbruck Hbf or Wien Hbf	Nightjet	Hannover Hbf towards Hamburg-Altona
Preceding station	DB Regio Südost	Following station
Terminus	RE 1	Heilbad Heiligenstadt towards Glauchau (Sachs)
Preceding station	Metronom	Following station
Terminus	RE 2	Nörten-Hardenberg towards Uelzen
Preceding station	DB Regio Nord	Following station
Terminus	RB 80	Nörten-Hardenberg towards Nordhausen
Terminus	RB 82	Nörten-Hardenberg towards Bad Harzburg
Terminus	RB 86	Nörten-Hardenberg towards Einbeck Mitte
Preceding station	Cantus	Following station
Friedland (Han) towards Kassel Hbf	RB 83	Terminus
Friedland (Han) towards Bebra	RB 87	Terminus
Preceding station	NordWestBahn	Following station
Lenglern towards Höxter-Ottbergen	RB 85	Terminus
Location

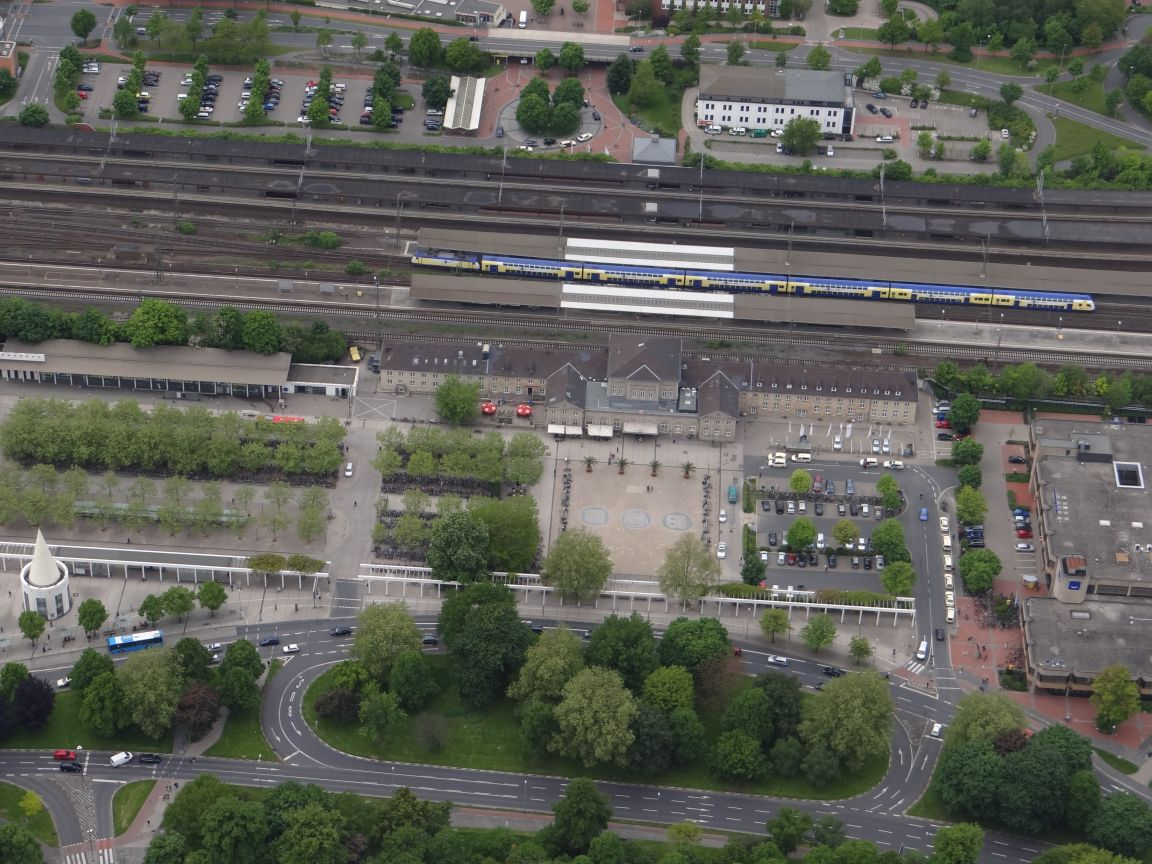
Aerial view

Göttingen railway station, known in German as Bahnhof Göttingen, is an InterCityExpress stop on Germany's domestic long-distance rail network and the only passenger station of the city of Göttingen. Built in 1854 as the terminus of the Hanoverian Southern Railway, the station lies west of the medieval town centre. The station today has four platform islands each with two through tracks. In addition there is a through track for goods traffic between the station building and the platforms.

== History ==
As part of the planning for the construction of the Hanoverian Southern Railway, the municipal council of the city of Göttingen decided in 1851 to request for the construction of a station west of its centre. During the followed three years there were sometimes heated discussions among citizens and in particular the affected landowners, until the groundbreaking ceremony in 1853. The planning was undertaken by Adolph Funk, Conrad Wilhelm Hase and Julius Rasch and construction was managed by Emil Hackländer. The design of the station followed the example of the Hannover Central Station (Central-Bahnhof) completed in 1847 in the Hanoverian Rundbogenstil ("round-arch" style) in natural stone. Operations commenced with carnival-like opening celebrations on 31 July 1854.

The section of the Hanoverian Southern Railway between Alfeld–and Göttingen was opened in 1854. It was extended to Kassel over the former Dransfeld ramp (Dransfelder rampe) in 1856. The Bebra–Göttingen railway was built from Göttingen to Friedland in 1867. The line was extended to Bebra in 1875 and 1876, creating a connection to Kassel via Eichenberg. The station building in Göttingen was built between 1856 and 1887 and rebuilt several times. The station forecourt was rebuilt at the beginning of the 20th century. In the summer palms were now placed in front of the station; these shaped the image of the station until the Second World War.

The station facilities were rebuilt again from was about 1910 until the 1920s. In particular, the tracks were raised south of the station (which in the southern section involved the relocation of the line to Eichenberg) and the building of an underpass for Groner Chaussee (now Groner Landstraße), as the railway crossing was congested by the increasing traffic and it has also been decided to build a tram line. The entrance building was rebuilt and given extensions. In the course of this rebuilding, the Garte Valley Railway (Gartetalbahn), a 750mm narrow gauge railway to Duderstadt that had previously ended at the station, was cut back to run to end at its own station about 400 metres further south; this line was closed in 1959.

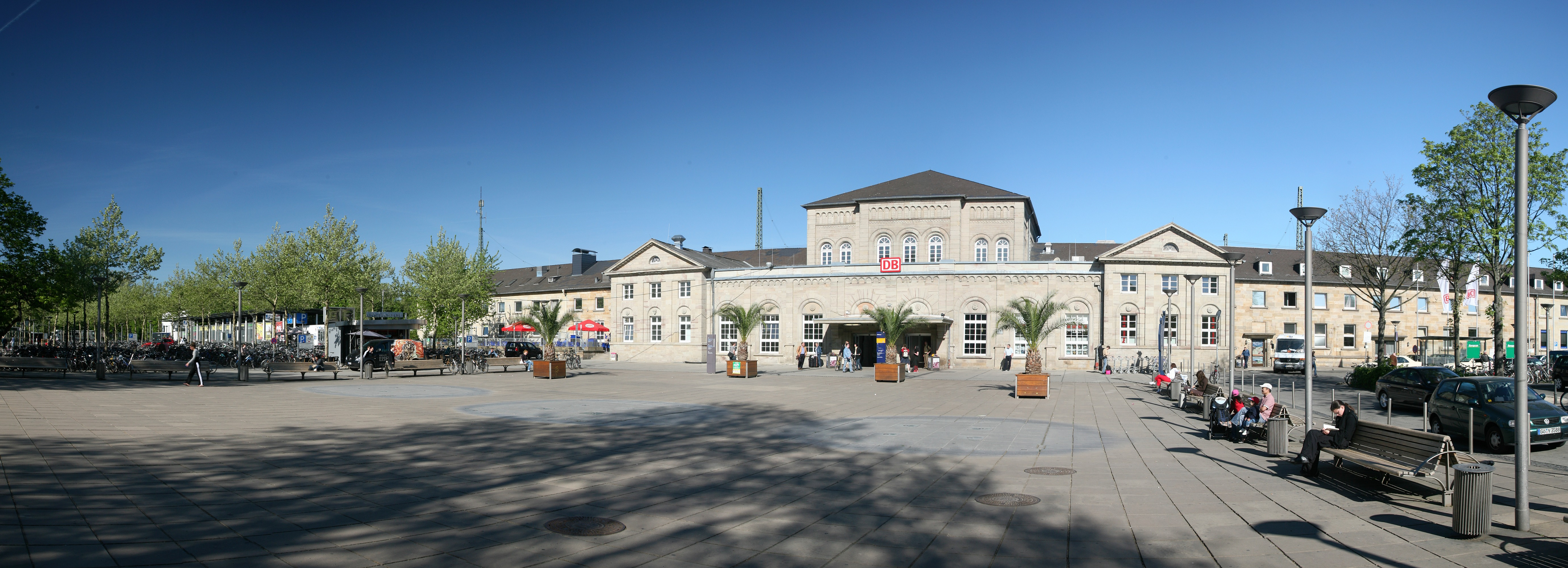
View from the forecourt

The station was largely destroyed by bombing during the Second World War. The station and the station hall were rebuilt in the postwar period in a simplified form with a redesigned facade. Göttingen was connected to the electrified rail network in 1963. In the 1960s, the station forecourt was rebuilt again and aligned for the requirements of motor traffic. The buses that previously stopped almost directly in front of the station have since operated from a central bus station to the south of the station building and a car parking area was built in front of the station. The first railway to Kassel, the section of the Hanoverian Southern Railway that ran via Dransfeld, was closed in May 1980.

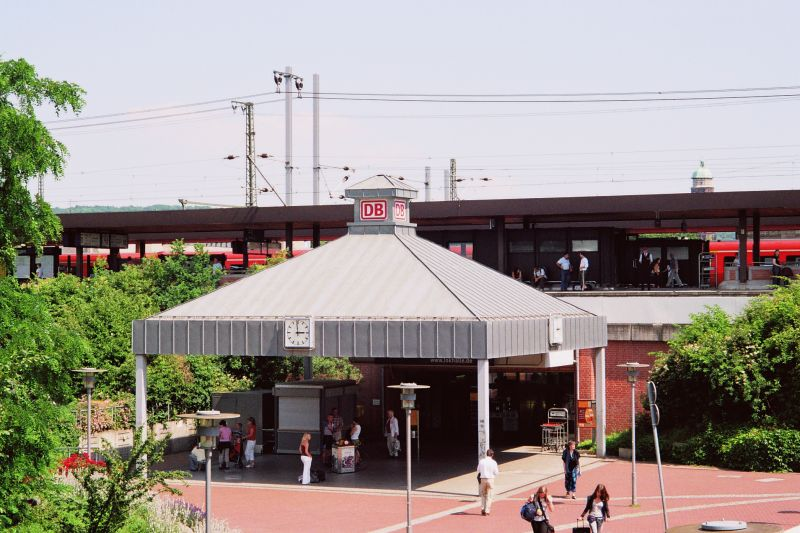
During the construction of the high-speed line a western entrance was built.

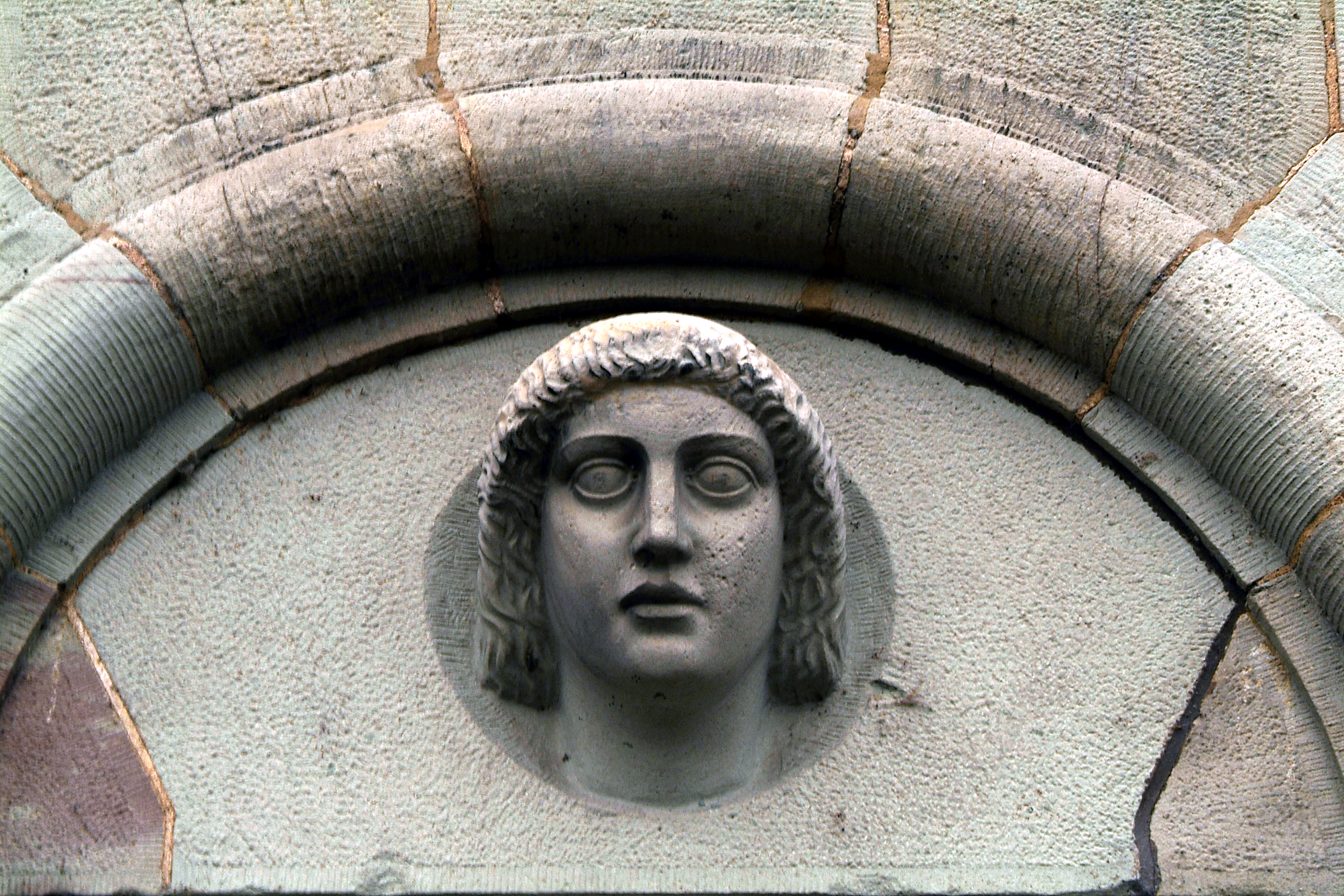
Plastic moulded head of a young man; detail on the facade of the station building

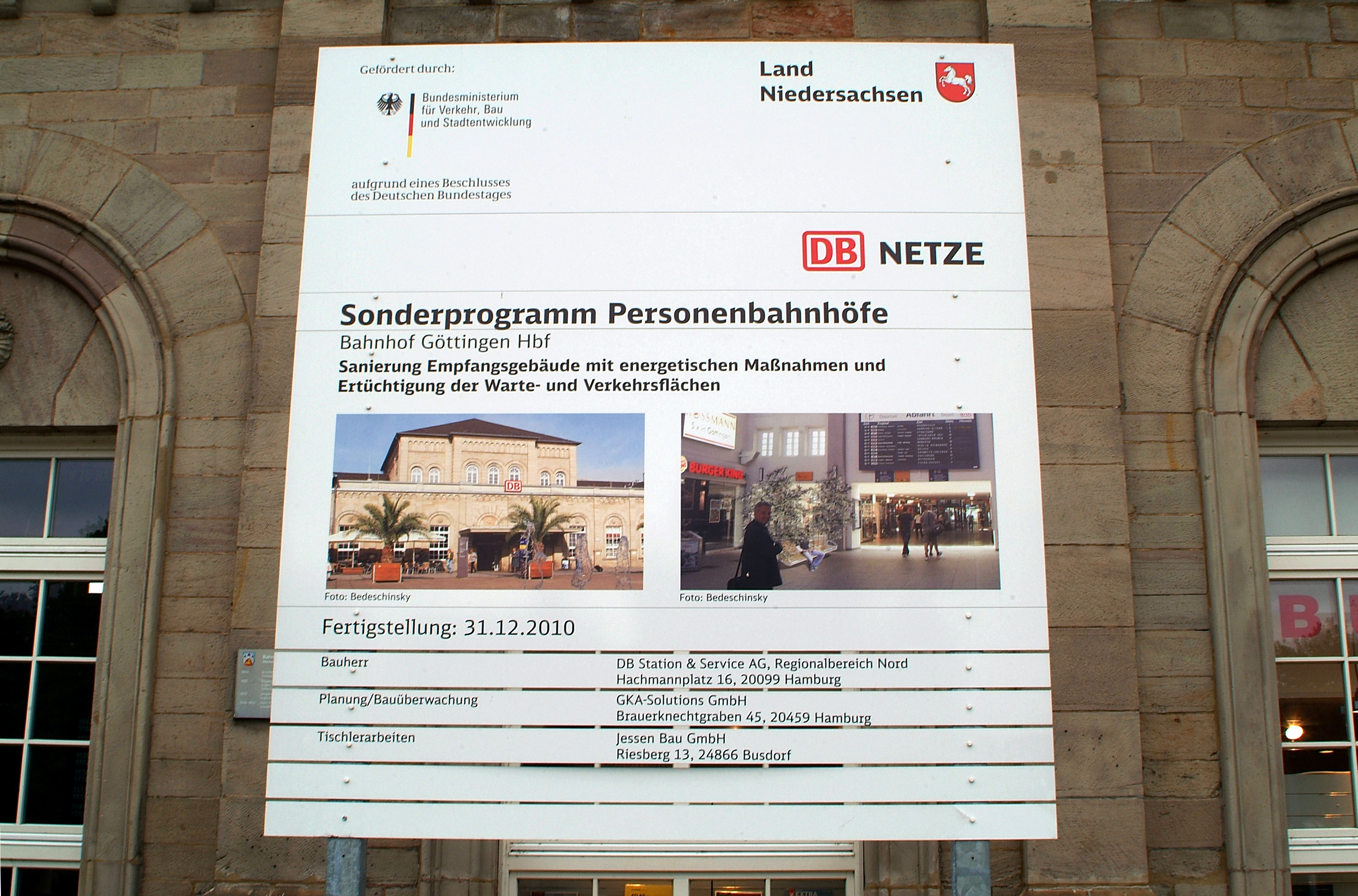
Information panel for renovation: "Completion: 31 December 2010" photo from September 2011

During the construction of the Hanover–Würzburg high-speed railway between 1984 and 1989, the station was extensively remodelled. It was extended to the west to a new platform serving tracks 10 and 11, the previous platform C (serving tracks 8 and 9) was demolished and rebuilt in the style of the new platform adjacent. Several buildings of the former workshop were demolished to build a new western entrance, including a passenger train servicing facility, which was re-erected elsewhere. The 400 m (1,300 ft) long platform C went into operation at the winter 1988/89 timetable change.

In 1981, it had been planned that the new line would have three tracks through the station area: apart from the two main tracks of the new line (the southern edge of platform C and the northern edge of platform D) it would have a track overtaking passenger trains (the southern edge of platform D). The original platform C was only used by services running to Bodenfelde.

The first plans for the new line in Lower Saxony, submitted in 1971, provided for a route though the Weser Uplands via Holzminden. After protests in the state and various studies and reports, the current route via Göttingen was adopted in 1976. The first of the two platforms for the new line was completed in September 1987. A total of 4.0 km (2.5 mi) of the tracks were adapted in the western part of the station area. The station area was a separate zoning section of the new line (no. 3.8 from km 98.750 to 101.000). The regional planning process in this area was completed on 30 September 1977.

Trains can run on the tracks of the new lines through the station at up to 120 km/h (75 mph), the subsequent curve past the marshalling yard can be run at 200 km/h (120 mph). The cruising speed through the station was chosen because all the passenger trains would stop in Göttingen anyway and this speed was considered sufficient for freight trains.

With a total of 172 scheduled long-distance services arrivals and departures per day, the station held 18th place in the Deutsche Bundesbahn network in the timetable for summer 1989.

The station forecourt was rebuilt in the 1990s. On the street outside the station there is a bus station along with a pergola. To accommodate the growing number of parked bicycles, a bicycle parking station was opened next to the station building. Nevertheless, the forecourt is still crammed with bikes.

The station was renovated in three stages for Expo 2000 in Hanover in the late 1990s. First began the extension of the subway tunnel in the area of the old platforms A and B (tracks 4/5 and 6/7) and the provision of additional space for retail in this tunnel. The old platforms were also redeveloped, with the focus on the entrance area with a partially glazed roof. The newly built platform lifts were boarded up for months due to the lack of a Federal Railway Authority (Eisenbahn-Bundesamt) approval. In the third phase of the rebuilding, the part of the station building next to the tracks were rebuilt with toilets and luggage lockers. Simultaneously, the three through tracks between the station building and platform A were reduced to one track.

The extensive renovation work was completed at the end of 2006 in the last phase, which included the complete renovation of the station entrance hall. The new shopping area was occupied by, among other things, a branch of a fast-food chain. The €13.8 million renovation was completed in late March 2007.

As part of the economic stimulus program, the entrance building was renovated to reduce energy use by DB Station&Service in 2010/2011. In the autumn of 2012, the bicycle parking facilities were completely renewed and considerably expanded. It is still planned to renew the dynamic passenger information systems to improve the quality of information on city buses and regional trains.

== Train services ==
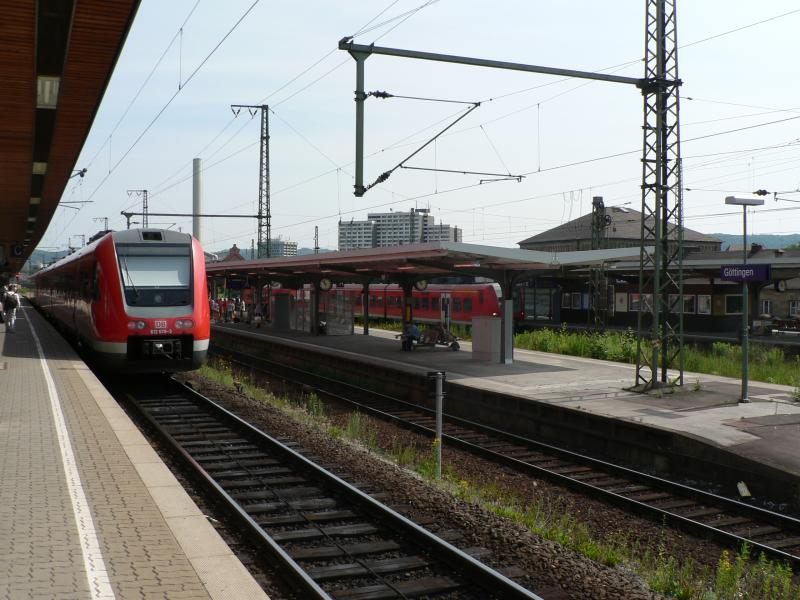
View from the new platform C of the lower platform B and A

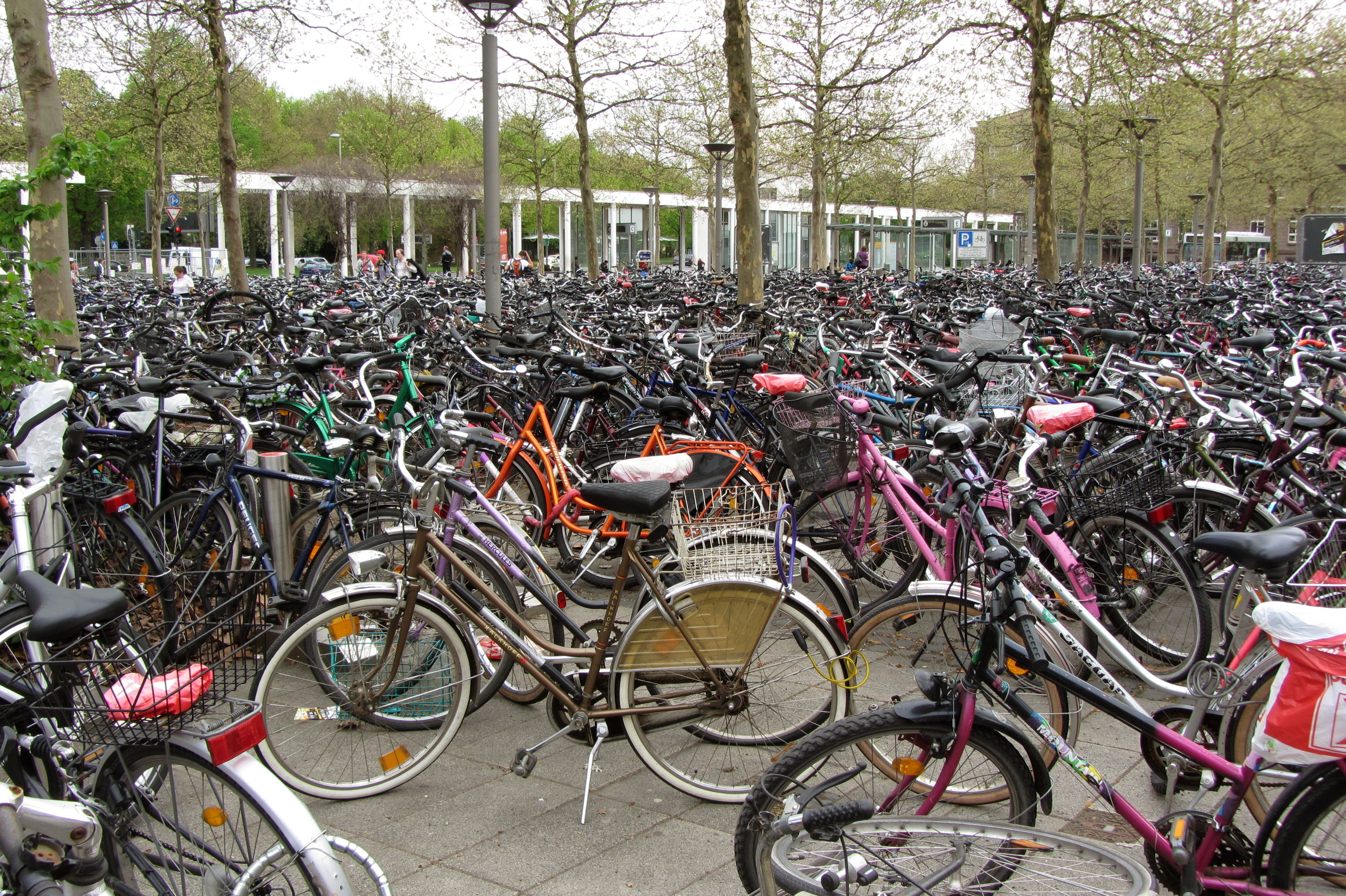
Cycles in the station forecourt

In the 2026 timetable, the following services stop at the station:

=== Long-distance services ===
Line	Route			Interval
ICE 12	Berlin Ostbahnhof – Berlin – Braunschweig – Göttingen – Kassel – Frankfurt – Mannheim – Freiburg – Basel – Switzerland			Every 2 hours
ICE 13	Stuttgart –	Heidelberg – Darmstadt –	Frankfurt South – Kassel – Göttingen – Braunschweig – Wolfsburg – Berlin – Berlin Ostbahnhof	Every 2 hours
ICE 13	Karlsruhe –	Heidelberg – Darmstadt –	Frankfurt South – Kassel – Göttingen – Braunschweig – Wolfsburg – Berlin – Berlin Ostbahnhof	Every 2 hours
ICE 13	Frankfurt Airport –		Frankfurt South – Kassel – Göttingen – Braunschweig – Wolfsburg – Berlin – Berlin Ostbahnhof	Every 2 hours
ICE/ECE 20	Hamburg – Hannover – Göttingen – Kassel-Wilhelmshöhe – Frankfurt – Mannheim – Karlsruhe – Freiburg – Basel			Every 2 hours
ICE 22	(Kiel –) Hannover – Göttingen – Kassel – Frankfurt – Frankfurt Airport – Mannheim – (Heidelberg –) Stuttgart			Every 2 hours
ICE 24	Hamburg-Altona – Hamburg – Hannover – Göttingen – Kassel – Fulda – Würzburg – Augsburg – Munich –		Schwarzach-St. Veit	1 train pair
ICE 24	Hamburg-Altona – Hamburg – Hannover – Göttingen – Kassel – Fulda – Würzburg – Augsburg – Munich –		Innsbruck	1 train pair
ICE 24	Westerland – Hamburg – Hannover – Göttingen – Kassel – Frankfurt			1 train pair
ICE 25	Hamburg-Altona – Hamburg – Hannover – Göttingen – Kassel – Fulda – Würzburg – Nuremberg – Ingolstadt – Munich			Hourly
ICE 26	Bremen – Hannover – Göttingen – Kassel-Wilhelmshöhe – Gießen – Frankfurt – Heidelberg – Karlsruhe			Every 4 hours
ICE 91	Hamburg – Hannover – Göttingen – Kassel – Fulda – Würzburg – Nürnberg – Regensburg – Plattling – Passau – Wels – Linz – St. Pölten – Vienna			1 train pair

=== Regional services ===
Line	Route	Interval	Operator	Railway
RE 1	Göttingen – Leinefelde – Gotha – Erfurt – Jena – Gera – Gößnitz – Glauchau (Sachs)/Elsterberg	Every two hours	DB Regio Südost	Göttingen–Bebra railway
RE 2	Göttingen – Northeim – Kreiensen – Alfeld (Leine) – Elze – Hannover (– Celle – Uelzen)	Hourly	Metronom	Hanoverian Southern Railway
RB 80	Göttingen – Nörten-Hardenberg – Northeim – Katlenburg – Wulften – Hattorf – Herzberg – Barbis – Bad Sachsa – Walkenried – Ellrich – Niedersachswerfen – Nordhausen	Every two hours	DB Regio Nord	South Harz Railway
RB 82	Göttingen – Nörten-Hardenberg – Northeim – Kreiensen – Seesen – Langelsheim – Goslar – Bad Harzburg	Every two hours	DB Regio Nord	
RB 83	Göttingen – Eichenberg – Hann Münden – Kassel Hbf (runs in the Göttingen–Eichenberg section combined with RB87)	Hourly	Cantus Verkehrsgesellschaft	Halle–Hann. Münden railway
RB 85	Göttingen – Lenglern – Adelebsen – Bodenfelde – Bad Karlshafen – Lauenförde – Ottbergen – Paderborn	Hourly	NordWestBahn	Göttingen–Bodenfelde railway
RB 86	Göttingen – Nörten-Hardenberg – Northeim – Einbeck-Salzderhelden – Einbeck Mitte	Individual services	DB Regio Nord	Ilme Railway
RB 87	Göttingen – Eichenberg – Eschwege – Bebra (runs in the Göttingen–Eichenberg section combined with RB83)	Hourly	Cantus Verkehrsgesellschaft	Göttingen–Bebra railway

== Locomotive shed ==
On the opposite side of the station, this historical industrial monument now accommodates a large multiplex cinema and multipurpose hall for conferences and events with 5,400 m ² of meeting space and 3,000 m ² of lobby area. A locomotive overhaul centre was set up here in 1855. The continuation of the route from Hannoversch Munden over the Dransfelder Incline required stronger locomotives for the steep gradients: these were stored and repaired in the Göttingen works. The buildings of the locomotive depot date from 1917. After 1976 the works were closed, the area lay vacant for two decades and although listed in 1981 by the Niedersächsische Institut für Baudenkmalpflege at first no profitable re-use was adopted. In 1993 plans for re-use led to the multiplex cinema opening in the northern part of the plant in 1996, the meeting hall in the southern end opened in December 1998.

== Gartetalbahn ==
Between 1897 and 1959 somewhat southeast of Göttingen Station was a station of 750 mm narrow-gauge railway, the Gartetalbahn to Rittmarshausen and Duderstadt.

== See also ==
- Rail transport in Germany
