= Northeim (Han) station =

Railway station in Northeim, Germany

Coordinates: 51.7033°N 9.9869°E

Northeim (Han)
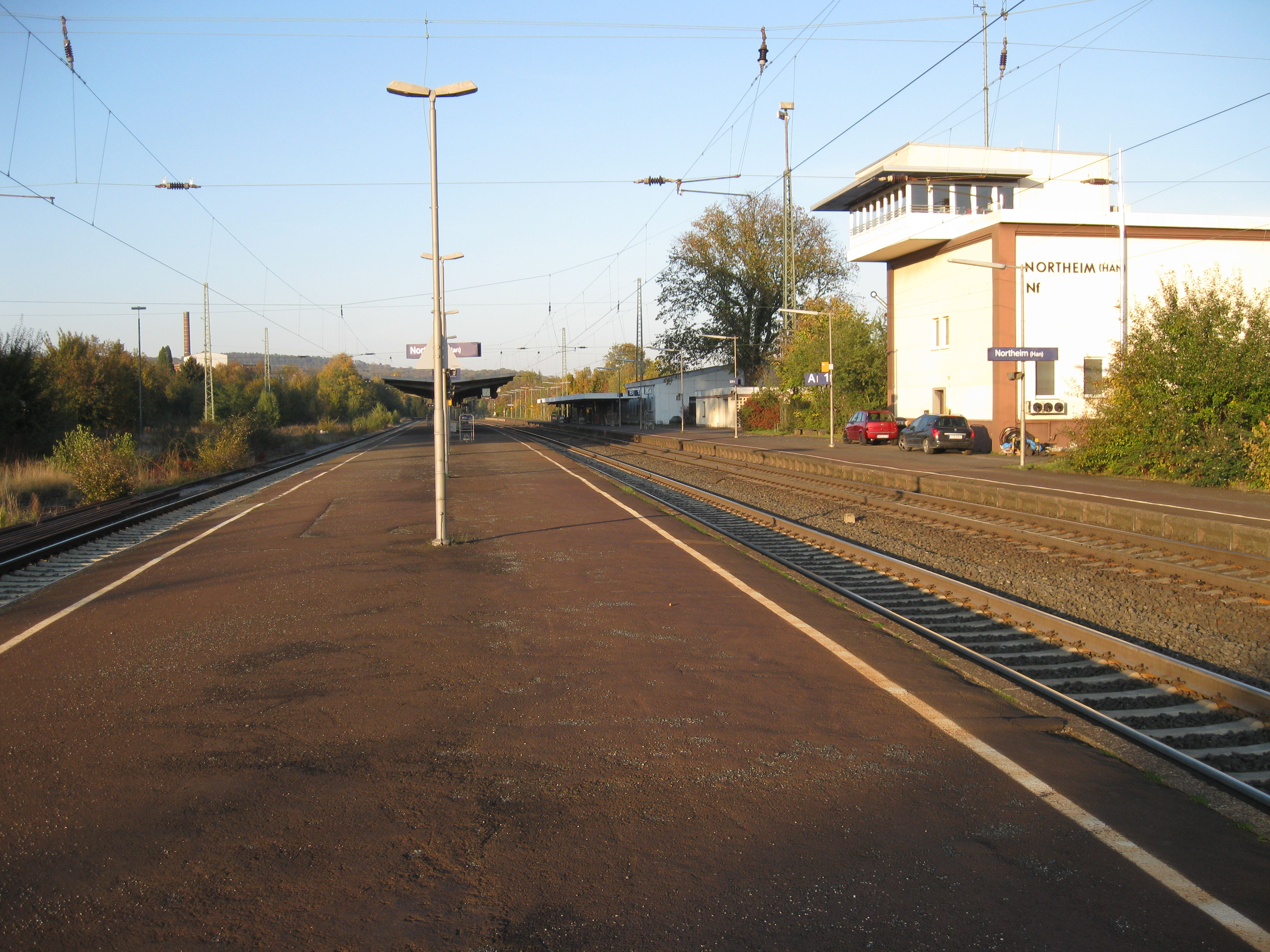
- Platforms 1–3 from the south, before the rebuilding (2011)

General information
- Owner: DB Netz
- Operator: DB Station&Service
- Lines: Hannöversche Südbahn (km 88.6) (KBS 350); Südharzstrecke (km 88.6) (KBS 357); Sollingbahn (km 64.0) (KBS 356)
- Platforms: 2 island platforms 2 side platforms
- Tracks: 6
- Train operators: DB Regio Nord; Metronom

Other information
- Station code: 4587
- DS100 code: HN
- IBNR: 8000283
- Category: 3
- Fare zone: VSN: 400
- Website: www.bahnhof.de

History
- Opened: 31 July 1854; 172 years ago

Services
Preceding station	Metronom	Following station
Nörten-Hardenberg towards Göttingen	RE 2	Einbeck-Salzderhelden towards Uelzen
Preceding station	DB Regio Nord	Following station
Nörten-Hardenberg towards Göttingen	RB 80	Katlenburg towards Nordhausen
Hardegsen towards Bodenfelde	RB 81	Katlenburg towards Nordhausen
Nörten-Hardenberg towards Göttingen	RB 82	Einbeck-Salzderhelden towards Bad Harzburg
Nörten-Hardenberg towards Göttingen	RB 86	Einbeck-Salzderhelden towards Einbeck Mitte
Location
- Location within Lower Saxony

Northeim (Han) railway station (German: Bahnhof Northeim (Han)) is a railway hub in the town of Northeim, Germany. It is classed as category 3 station and has six platforms. In addition to 3 daily Intercity trains, regional railway trains stop at the station.

== History ==
Northeim was connected to the railway network on 31 July 1854 with the opening of the line from Alfeld to Göttingen (the old North-South Line). On 1 September 1871 the South Harz Railway to Herzberg (Harz) and Nordhausen was opened. With the opening of the Solling Railway to Ottbergen on 15 January 1878, Northeim became an important railway hub. From then on, the railway had a major impact on the development of the town.

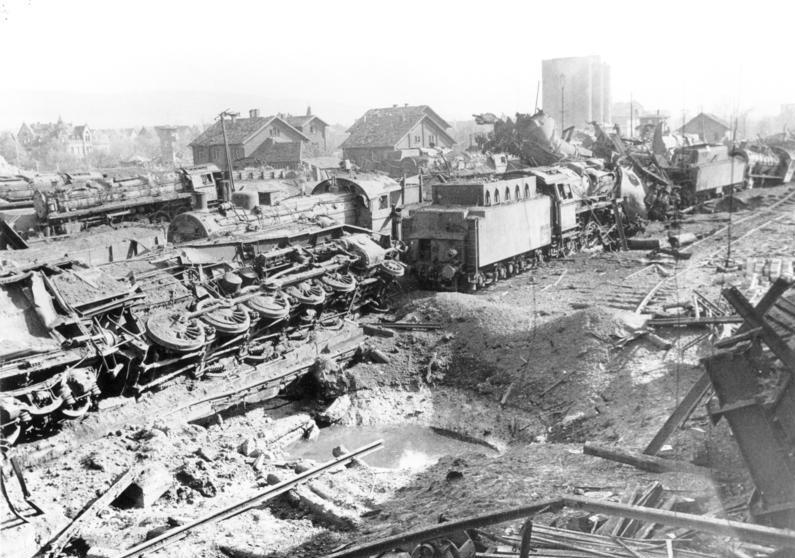
The bombed out station in April 1945

Heavy air raids in February and April 1945 fully destroyed Northeim station and its station hall, which had been built in 1885. After the Second World War, work on rebuilding Northeim station began.

In the late 1960s the present station building was constructed; in 1993 a travel centre was built that replaced the traditional ticket counters.

From 1988, trains of the first InterRegio line in the Deutsche Bahn stopped at the station. These services replaced the D-Zug expresses. In December 2002 the InterRegio trains were superseded by 2-hourly Intercity trains.

On 15 November 1992 at 1:30 am there was an accident in the immediate vicinity of Northeim station that resulted in 11 deaths and 51 injuries.

In 2014 the station was upgraded and modernised at a cost of €6.4 million. The western platforms, 1 to 3, have since had a height of 76 cm, the eastern ones, nos. 11 to 13, a height of 55 cm.

In 2016 the underpass on the western side of the station was lengthened.

== Connections ==
=== Local services ===
Northeim lies on the line from Hanover to Frankfurt am Main and Hanover to Würzburg (the old North-South Line), on which Metronom Eisenbahngesellschaft trains have operated hourly since December 2005. In addition the South Harz Railway via Herzberg (Harz) to Nordhausen begins here, as does the Solling Railway to Ottbergen, on which trains run hourly or two-hourly.

=== Long distance services ===
Since the timetable change of 2009/2010 in December 2009 the number of Intercity trains calling at Northeim were significantly reduced. The majority of IC services run instead on the Hanoverian Southern Railway on the Hanover–Wurzburg high-speed line. Three pairs of Intercity trains remain in the Leine valley and stop, as was normal until 2009, in Alfeld, Northeim and Kreiensen.
