= Bad Harzburg station =

Railway station in Bad Harzburg, Germany

Bad Harzburg
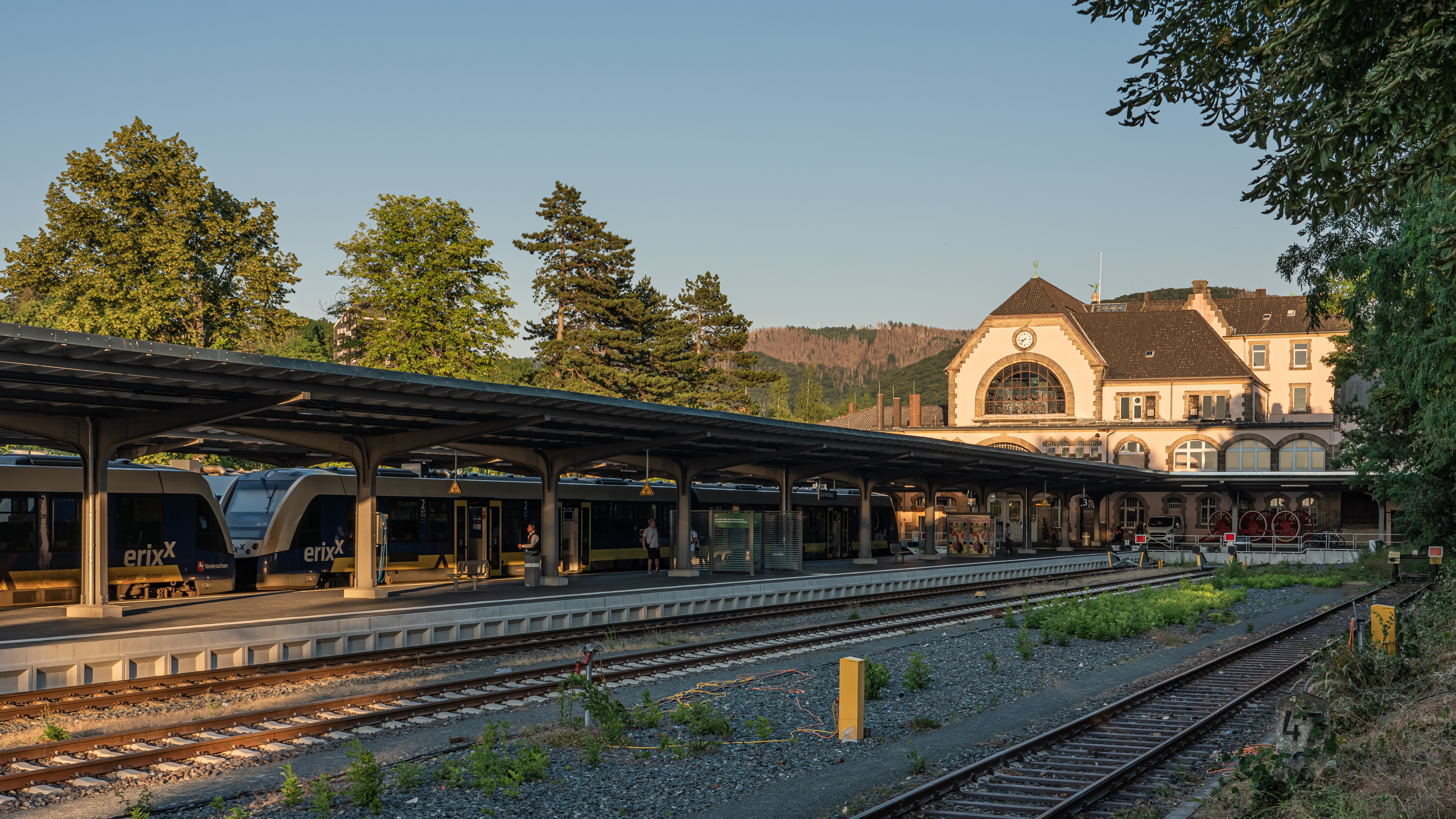
- The platforms and the station building

General information
- Location: Dr. Heinrich-Jasper-Str. 2, Bad Harzburg, Lower Saxony; Germany
- Coordinates: 51°53′16″N 10°33′18″E
- Lines: Brunswick – Bad Harzburg (KBS 353; km 47.2); Heudeber-Danstedt – Bad Harzburg (closed; km 32.2); Oker – Bad Harzburg (KBS 320, 353, 354; km 32.2)
- Platforms: 4 (formerly 6)

Construction
- Accessible: Yes
- Architectural style: Jugendstil

Other information
- Station code: 281
- DS100 code: HBHA
- IBNR: 8000019
- Category: 3
- Fare zone: VRB: 90
- Website: www.bahnhof.de

History
- Opened: 22 August 1840

Services
| Preceding station | | Following station |
|---|---|---|
| Goslar towards Hannover Hbf | RE 10 | Terminus |
| Terminus | RB 42 | Vienenburg towards Braunschweig Hbf |
| Preceding station | DB Regio Nord | Following station |
| Oker towards Göttingen | RB 82 | Terminus |
Location
- Location within Lower Saxony Location within Germany Location within Europe

Bad Harzburg railway station (German: Bahnhof Bad Harzburg) serves the spa town of Bad Harzburg in Lower Saxony, Germany. It is the southern terminus of the Brunswick–Bad Harzburg railway, one of the oldest lines in Germany, and the eastern terminus of a branch line to nearby Oker station. Regional rail services are operated by Deutsche Bahn AG and Erixx GmbH.

== Location and construction ==
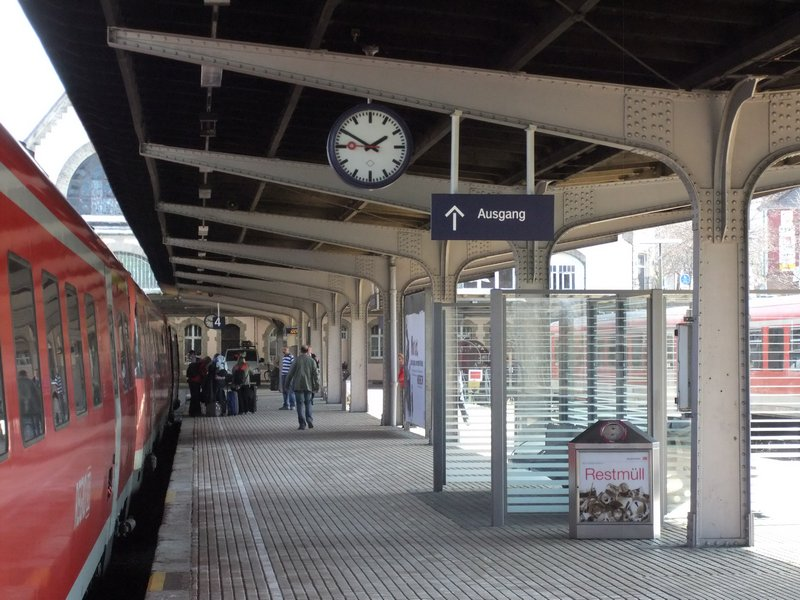
Regional train on platform 4 in 2012

The station is located north of the Harzburg town centre at an altitude of approximately 328 metre above NN. The station tracks run from the northwest to the southeast. The station precinct is bordered to the south by the streets of Dr.-Heinrich-Jasper-Straße and Herzog-Julius-Straße (state route 501), to the east and to the north by Straße Am Güterbahnhof and to the north by Badestraße.

The station is located on VzG lines 1901 (Brunswick–Bad Harzburg) and 6425 (Heudeber-Danstedt – Stapelburg [– Bad Harzburg] and Bad Harzburg – Oker). The line from Stapelburg has been closed since 1973 and was dismantled several years later.

The six main platform tracks of the station (tracks 1–6) are located on the southwest side at three island platforms; track 1 is out of use. The platform of tracks 1/2 is not covered and the platforms of tracks 3–6 are partially covered, but there is no train shed. The platforms are connected by a concourse at the southeast end, this is bordered by the entrance building opened in 1905. Its facade is built in the Renaissance Revival style and its interior in the Jugendstil (art nouveau). The freight yard is located to the east of the passenger station. Since the last reconstruction in 2003, this has had four loading tracks (tracks 10–13).

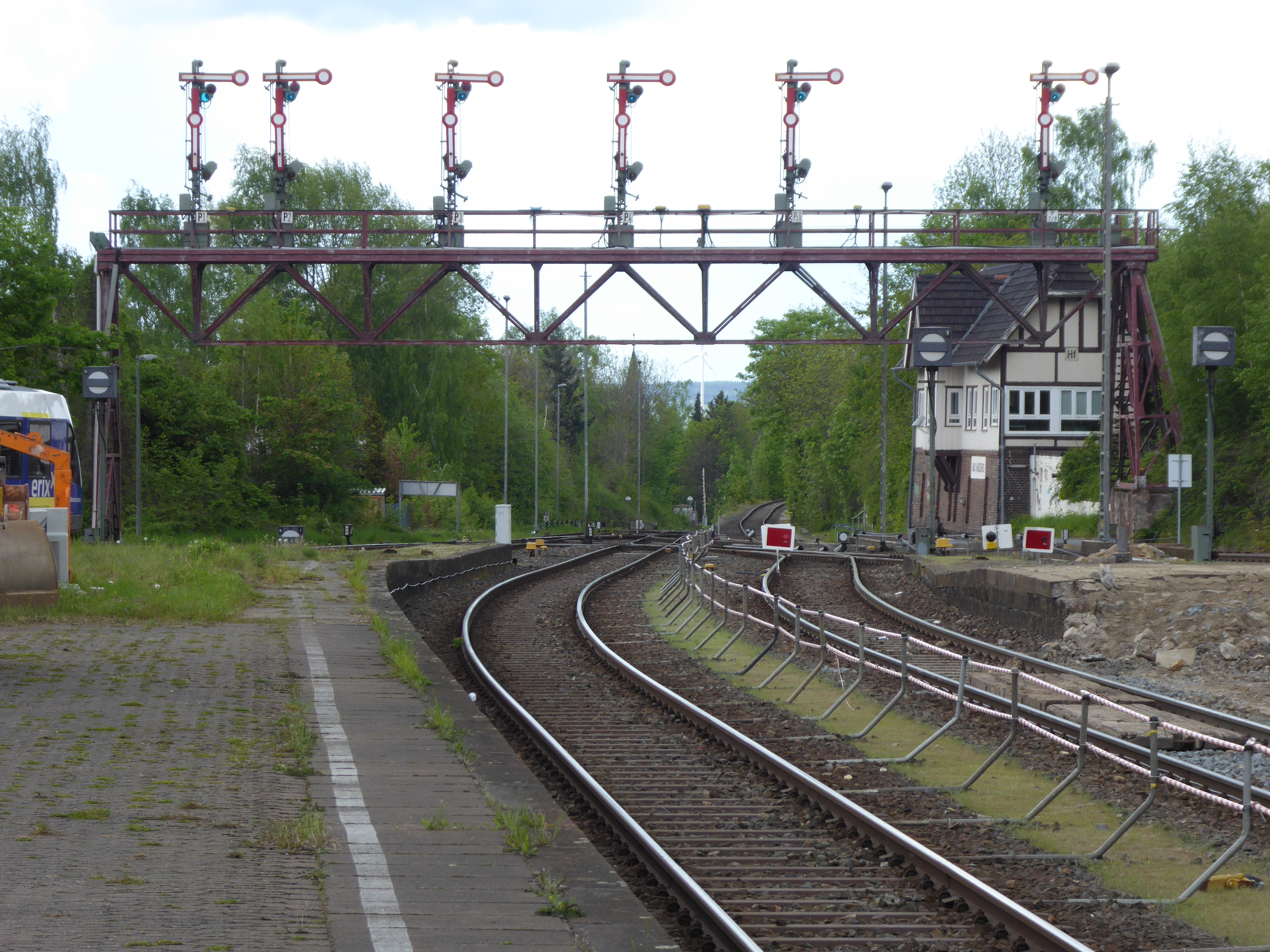
Signal gantry in Bad Harzburg, May 2017. The former line to Stapelburg is the higher track, running to the right in the background, the tracks to Vienenburg and Oker run lower and to the left.

Signals and points were controlled by mechanical interlockings, operated and monitored at the station entrance. The station's entrance signals (A and B) are located next to the level crossing at Westeroder Straße, the former entry signal from Eckertal was in the same area. The exit signals are mounted on a signal gantry at the entrance to the station. Exits from tracks 5 and 6 and 7 to 11 are controlled by two group exit signals (P5/6 and P7/11). With the exception of the main tracks 3 and 4, all tracks have blocking signals. The signal box of the Jüdel type is located immediately north of the bridge. It was opened on 17 May 1906.

In an earlier planning phase, the construction of two new island platforms (tracks 3/4 and 5/6) and a side platform were initially planned to replace the western island platform 1/2, so that a total of five platform edges would have been available for passenger traffic (with a minimum operational requirement of three). However, the side platform was later rejected and the historic, western island platform was scheduled for demolition without replacement. As part of this project, between 10 April 2017 and 28 July 2017, the island platforms were lowered from their previous height of 76 cm (30 in) to 55 cm (22 in) and the platform length was shortened from 180 m (590 ft) to 170 m (560 ft). A tactile guidance system for people with visual impairments was installed on these platforms, and the weather shelters and display case lighting were replaced. A total of more than €3.8 million were invested in the renovation (as of 2017). The western central platform was demolished in April 2018 without replacement.

== History ==
On 13 November 1837, the Duchy of Brunswick concluded a treaty with the Kingdom of Hanover to establish a railway connection from Brunswick via Wolfenbüttel to Neustadt unter der Harzburg. (Note: from 1892: Bad Harzburg.) The initiative came from the Brunswick Privy Councillor Philipp August von Amsberg. The section from Vienenburg to Harzburg was opened on 22 August 1840. Since the locomotives then used could not handle the slope (1 in 49) between Vienenburg station and the southern terminal station, the Duchy of Brunswick State Railway used horse-haulage on this section. The whole line to Brunswick was opened on 31 October 1841 and the ramp to Harzburg was converted to steam operation by 8 November 1843.

After Wernigerode was connect to the railway network in 1872, plans were developed for a connection from there via Ilsenburg to Harzburg. The initiator of the project, Count Otto zu Stolberg-Wernigerode, succeeded in having a line built from Halberstadt to Wernigerode and the extension of the line to Ilsenburg followed in 1884. The nearby hoteliers, made a strong case for the closing of the gap between Ilsenburg and Harzburg, referring to the region's tourism. The Landtag of Prussia approved the project in 1890, whereupon the responsible Royal Railway Division (Königliche Eisenbahndirektion, KED) of Magdeburg investigated different route options.

Initially, a direct route via Abbenrode was planned, but the adjoining property owners did not want to sell their land. An alternative proposal for a route with a tunnel through the Butterberg failed because of its high cost. In both cases, Harzburg station would have been rebuilt as a through station. The third option considered by KED Magdeburg would have been a connection north of the Schimmerwald (forest). However, as this would have unnecessarily extended the line and reduced the costs only slightly compared to the tunnel option and it was also rejected. The compromise ultimately provided for a route through the Schimmerwald and the connection of the railway from the north. The route had a greater gradient than the other options, but was ultimately the least expensive option. The Duchy of Brunswick agreed to the project in 1892, after which the construction work began. The line was formerly inaugurated on 30 September 1894.

The station had a different structure at this time. The present passenger station included two platform tracks and a middle track for maneuvering; all three tracks were connected with each other over a 12.6-metre-turntable. At the northern end, there was a restaurant, which was connected with the entrance building next to the platform. East of it was another platform with an express freight ramp. Another turntable was located at the freight yard. The locomotive depot was north of the passenger station. The facilities stretched west of the tracks and included a twin-track roundhouse, a water tower and a small workshop. The station also had a signal box at the northern end and two guard signal boxes. These were located west of the entrance to the freight yard and near the express freight ramp. The water tower and the engine shed were built in 1894 with the construction of the line from Ilsenburg.

At the beginning of the 20th century, there was a major renovation of the station. This was precipitated by the construction of the branch line to Oker, which was completed in 1912. The second track was installed on the line to Vienenburg in 1907. The passenger station was equipped with three terminal platforms, which were connected to the new station building in 1905. The two smaller turntables were abandoned and replaced by a 20-metre turntable in the locomotive depot. These were now served by two connections between the platforms, which were controlled by hand-operated sets of points. The locomotive depot was also expanded. The signal box and the depot located at the freight yard were replaced by the KED Magdeburg with a new mechanical interlocking at its north end in the same year. Its notable feature is the signal gantry, which still stands. The turntable was enlarged to a diameter of 23.6 metres in the 1920s. At about the same time, canopies were installed on platforms B and C.

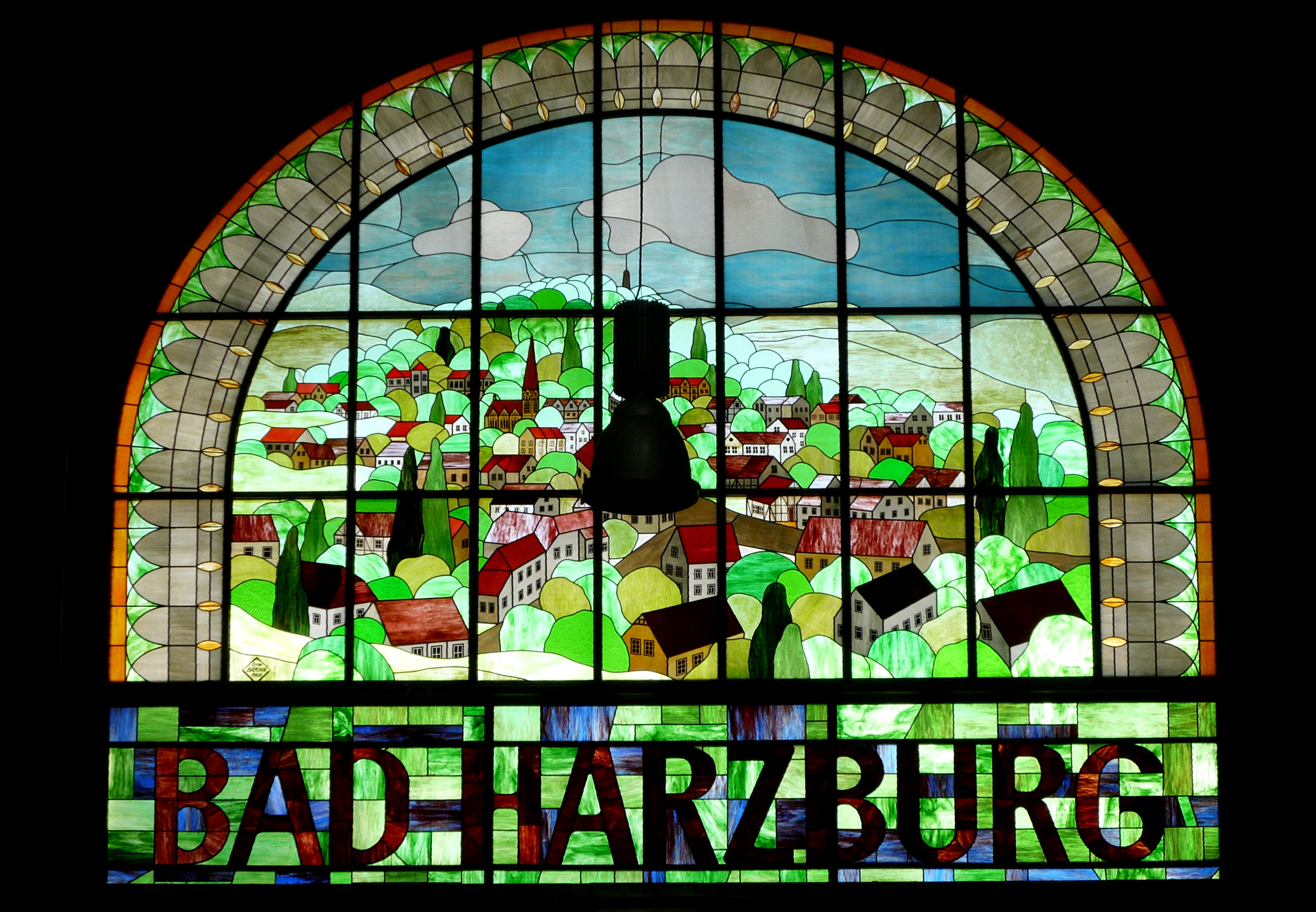
Stained glass window in the entrance building with a view of Bad Harzburg (east window), 2013

In 1942, Deutsche Reichsbahn rebuilt the second track from Vienenburg. The station was long spared from military action during the Second World War. At that time, Deutsche Reichsbahn preferred to use the connection from Heudeber-Danstedt to Goslar via Wernigerode and Bad Harzburg for diverted traffic. The foothills of the low mountain range were expected to provide sufficient protection against air raids, which did not prove true at the end of the war. US soldiers reached Goslar on 10 April 1945 and a day later Bad Harzburg was freed. At the same time, the Stapelburg air munitions plant, which was six kilometres away, blew up after an air raid. The blast of the detonation was so strong that the east window at Harzburg station was broken. It was restored in 1986 to almost original condition.

The US troops withdrew on 29 May 1945 as Bad Harzburg lay in the British occupation zone. The Red Army controlled the areas east of Bad Harzburg from 1 July 1945. Through traffic from Bad Harzburg to the Soviet occupation zone was first interrupted with the invasion; in 1946, after agreement between the two occupying powers, a few isolated refugee trains crossed the demarcation line. After that, the western part of the line was reduced to the section from Harzburg to Eckertal. Deutsche Bundesbahn, which emerged from the Reichsbahn in 1949, abandoned passenger traffic to Eckertal on 21 May 1955; until 27 September 1958 buses still operated rail replacement services. Freight traffic ended on 11 June 1957. An approximately 225 metre-long remnant served as a storage track and headshunt until the 1970s.

In the 1970s, Deutsche Bundesbahn closed the locomotive depot in Bad Harzburg. The remaining facilities were removed in the mid-1980s. At the end of the 1990s, there was a major dismantling of freight transport facilities. DB Cargo intended at that time to operate block freight trains, which included only individual gravel trains. After the company abandoned operations in 2002, EVB took them over. The gravel loading facilities were rebuilt in the following year.

Since 2006, DB Netz has intended to replace the mechanical interlockings in Bad Harzburg and its environs with electronic interlockings controlled from the Harz-Weser electronic control centre in Göttingen. In 2010, it became known that the implementation of the project would be delayed by up to ten years.

== Rail service ==
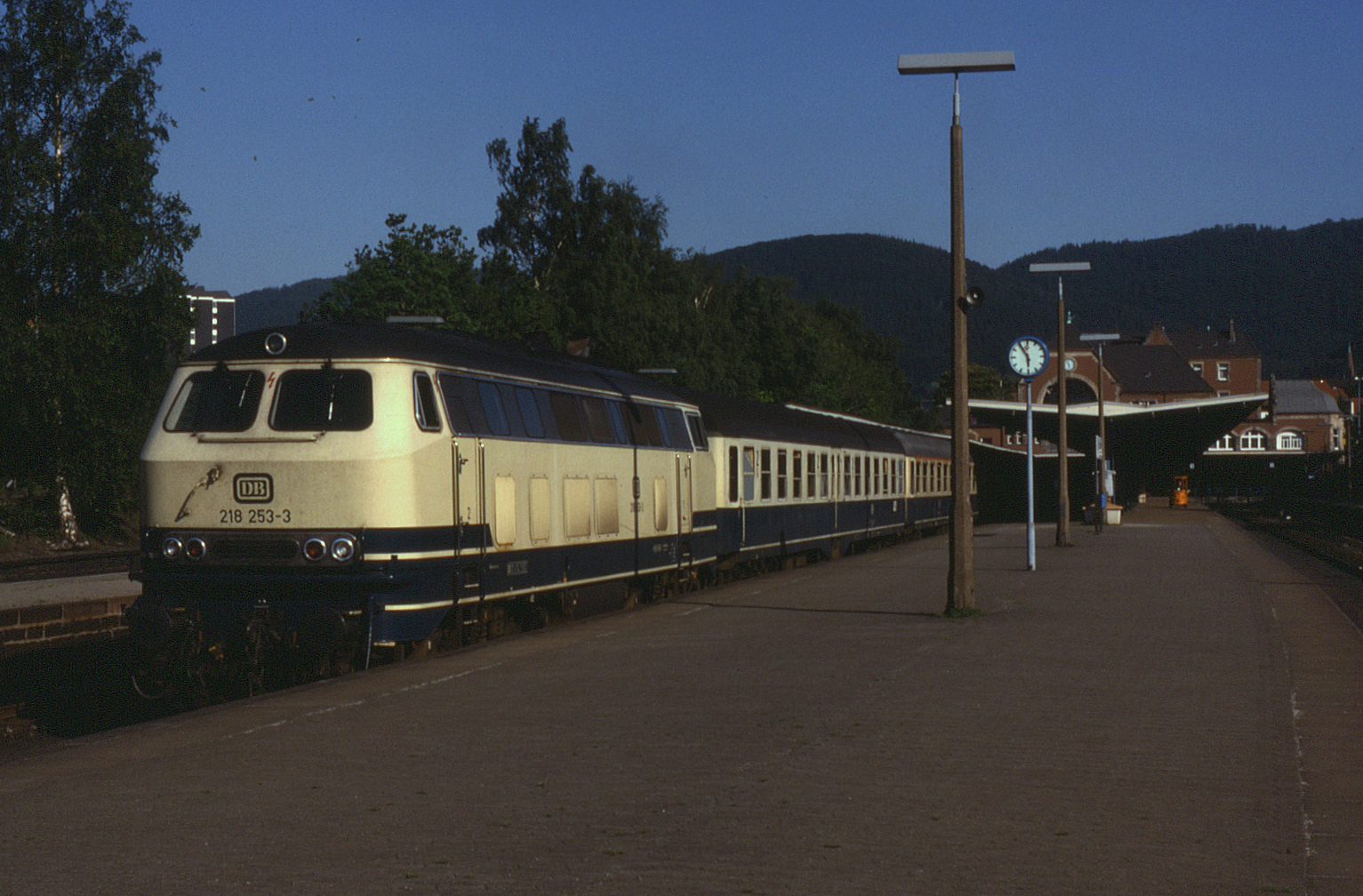
218 253 in front of a passenger train at platform track 4, 1989

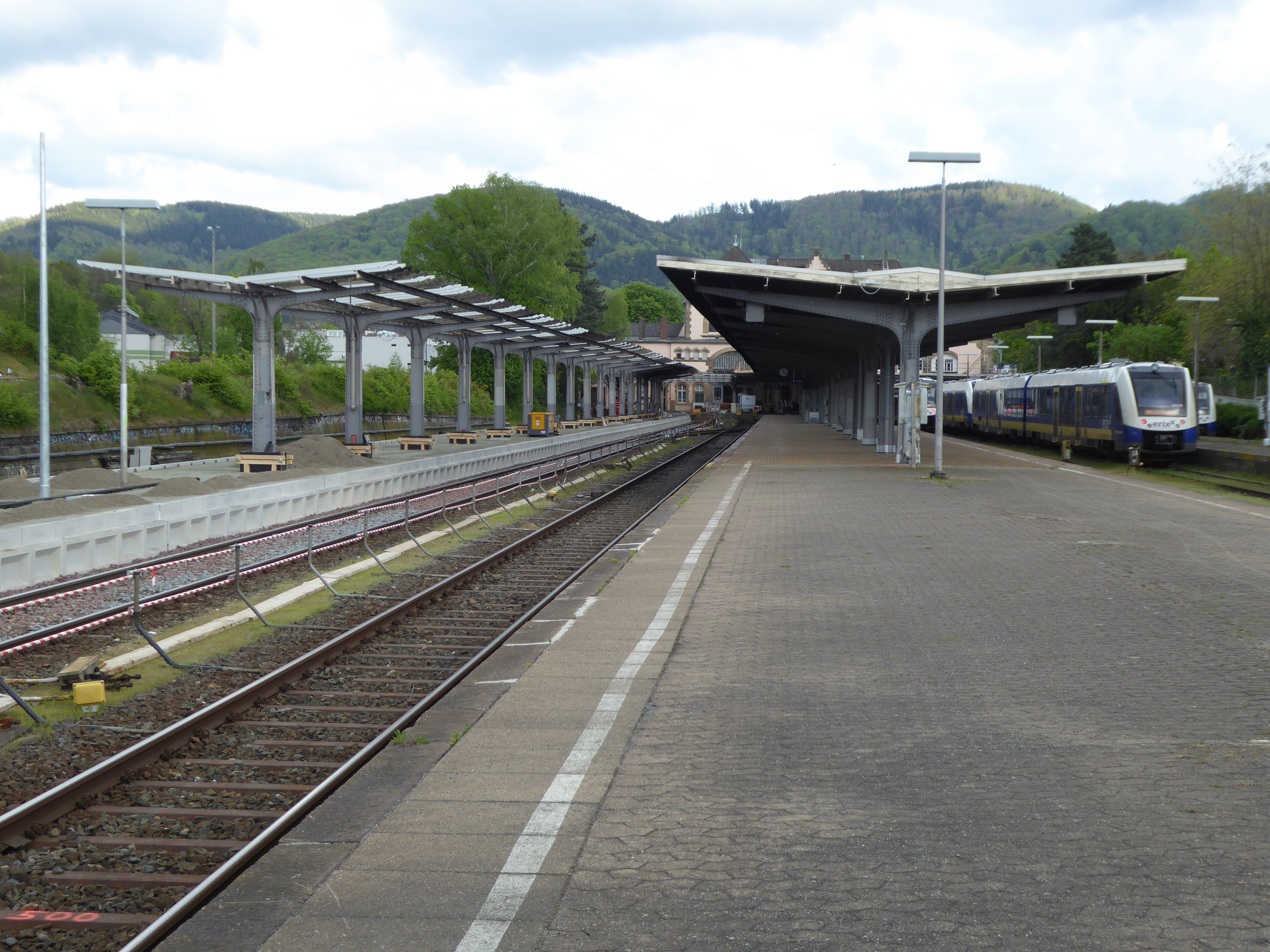
View of the platforms in Bad Harzburg, May 2017. Platform 5/6 is being renewed. On the right is an Erixx diesel multiple unit.

While predominately local services were operated on the line to and from Brunswick, the trains on the lines opened in 1894 and 1912 were used especially for holiday traffic. With the opening of the line to Oker in 1912, the trains coming from Halberstadt mostly continued to Goslar. The summer timetable of 1914 listed 14 train pairs plus two train pairs in the summer months only on the line to Vienenburg/Brunswick. Seven train pairs shuttled between Halberstadt/Wernigerode, Bad Harzburg and Goslar each day, four pairs of trains ran from Bad Harzburg to both Halberstadt/Wernigerode and Goslar daily, a pair of trains ran to Goslar on weekdays and various holiday trains served the station. The KED Magdeburg therefore planned the doubling of the track between Ilsenburg and Bad Harzburg. The project did not proceed because of the First World War and it was not implemented after the war.

The services operated in the 1920s and 1930s were similar to those of 1914. During the Great Depression, however, the holiday services operated were reduced to about the same level as during the world wars. In addition to the local trains running to Brunswick, Halberstadt and Goslar in the summer of 1939, five pairs of express trains ran through Bad Harzburg. These were direct services to Berlin, Magdeburg, Halle (Saale), Hildesheim or Hanover.

After 1946, the line from Bad Harzburg towards Wernigerode and Halberstadt was blocked after Eckertal. The remaining section was served by Deutsche Bundesbahn with two pairs of trains on working days from 1950. It stopped passenger operations in 1955. Freight traffic to a sawmill in Eckertal continued for another two years, but had to be abandoned due to the track going out of gauge on the curves. Until the sawmill burned down in 1963, Deutsche Bundesbahn supplied it by substitute services (trucks). The connections to the west and north, however, were expanded and in the summer of 1950, for example, there were express trains to Hanover and Düsseldorf and through coaches to Bonn and the Hook of Holland.

After German reunification the district of Wernigerode planned the restoration of the connection from Bad Harzburg via Eckertal and Stapelburg towards Wernigerode. Because both Deutsche Bundesbahn and Deutsche Reichsbahn sought a continuous connection from Halle to Brunswick and Hanover, a reversal in Bad Harzburg would have been unavoidable. The closing of the gap would therefore be further north at Vienenburg, making possible a direct connection via Goslar, bypassing Bad Harzburg.

The Harz-Express (RE 4), which was added to the summer timetable and ran from Hanover to Halle via Goslar and Halberstadt temporarily, ran through Bad Harzburg. In the spring of 2012, the Landesnahverkehrsgesellschaft Niedersachsen (Lower Saxony Transport Company, a state agency which is responsible for organising passenger rail services in parts of Lower Saxony) announced that the services between Hanover and Goslar would be abandoned from the beginning of the 2015 timetable and the service would run directly from Goslar to Vienenburg. The service from Hanover to Bad Harzburg would be handled at the same frequency, hourly, as the RE 10. Operation on this line and two other regional railway services from Bad Harzburg to Brunswick and Göttingen were taken over by Erixx from the timetable change on 12 December 2014, a subsidiary of Osthannoversche Eisenbahnen (OHE).

The station is served by the following trains (as of 2025):

2025 timetable
| Line | Route | Interval | Operator |
|---|---|---|---|
| RE 10 | Bad Harzburg – Goslar – Salzgitter-Ringelheim – Hildesheim Hbf – Hannover Hbf | hourly | Erixx |
| RB 42 | Bad Harzburg – Vienenburg – Wolfenbüttel – Brunswick | hourly | Erixx |
| RB 82 | Bad Harzburg – Goslar – Langelsheim – Seesen – (Bad Gandersheim –) Kreiensen (– Northeim (Han) – Göttingen) | hourly | DB Regio Nord |
