= Herzberg–Seesen railway =

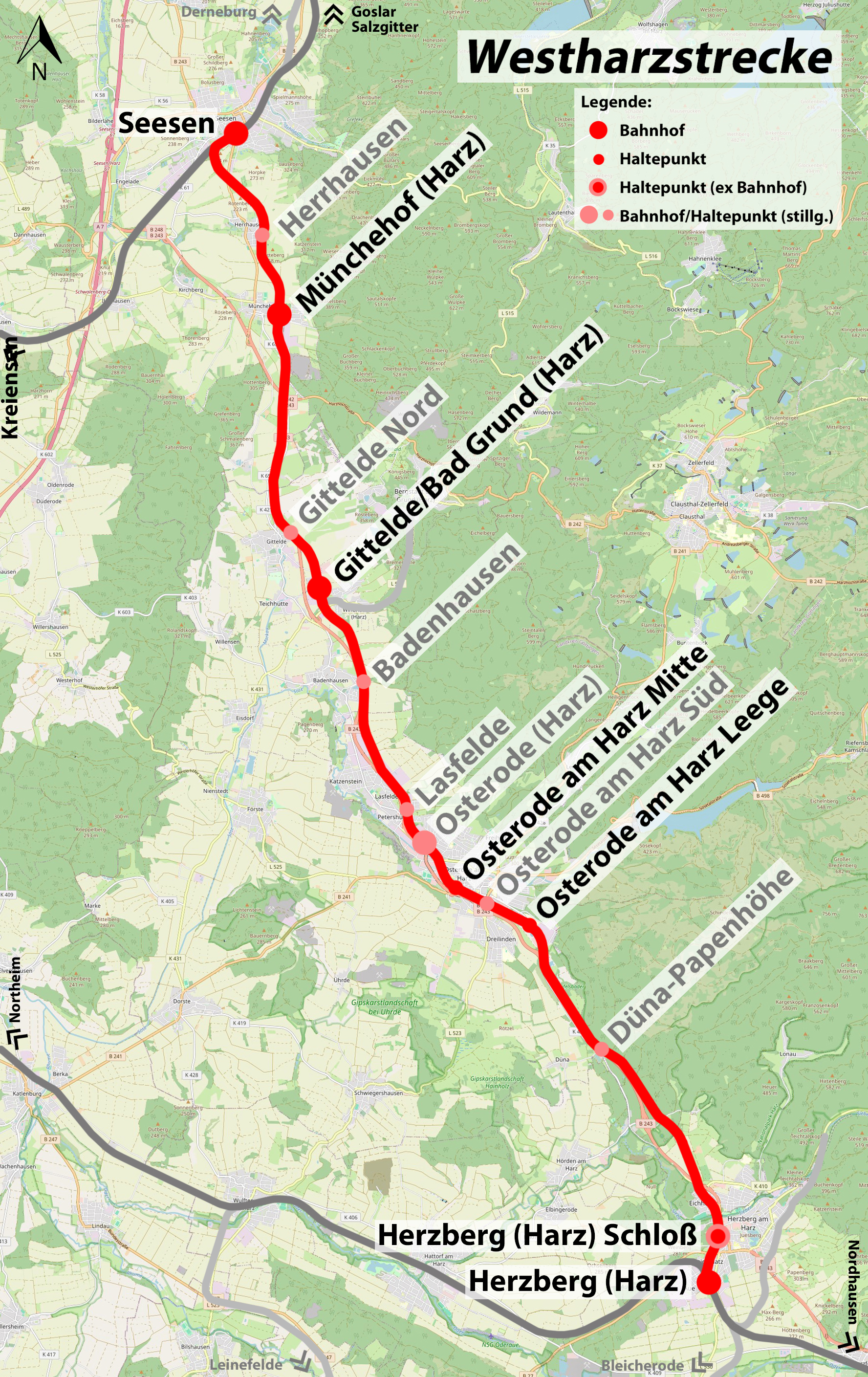

Overview
- Line number: 1812

Service
- Route number: 358

Technical
- Line length: 32 km
- Track gauge: 1,435 mm
- Operating speed: 80 max.

The Herzberg–Seesen railway, also known as the West Harz Line (German: Westharzstrecke), is a 32 km long railway line, that runs along the western edge of the Harz mountains and serves the town and the district of Osterode am Harz. It is the shortest link from Brunswick to Erfurt and is worked today by Lint multiples from Brunswick via Salzgitter, Seesen and Osterode to Herzberg mainly at hourly intervals. In Herzberg there are connexions to Göttingen and Nordhausen.

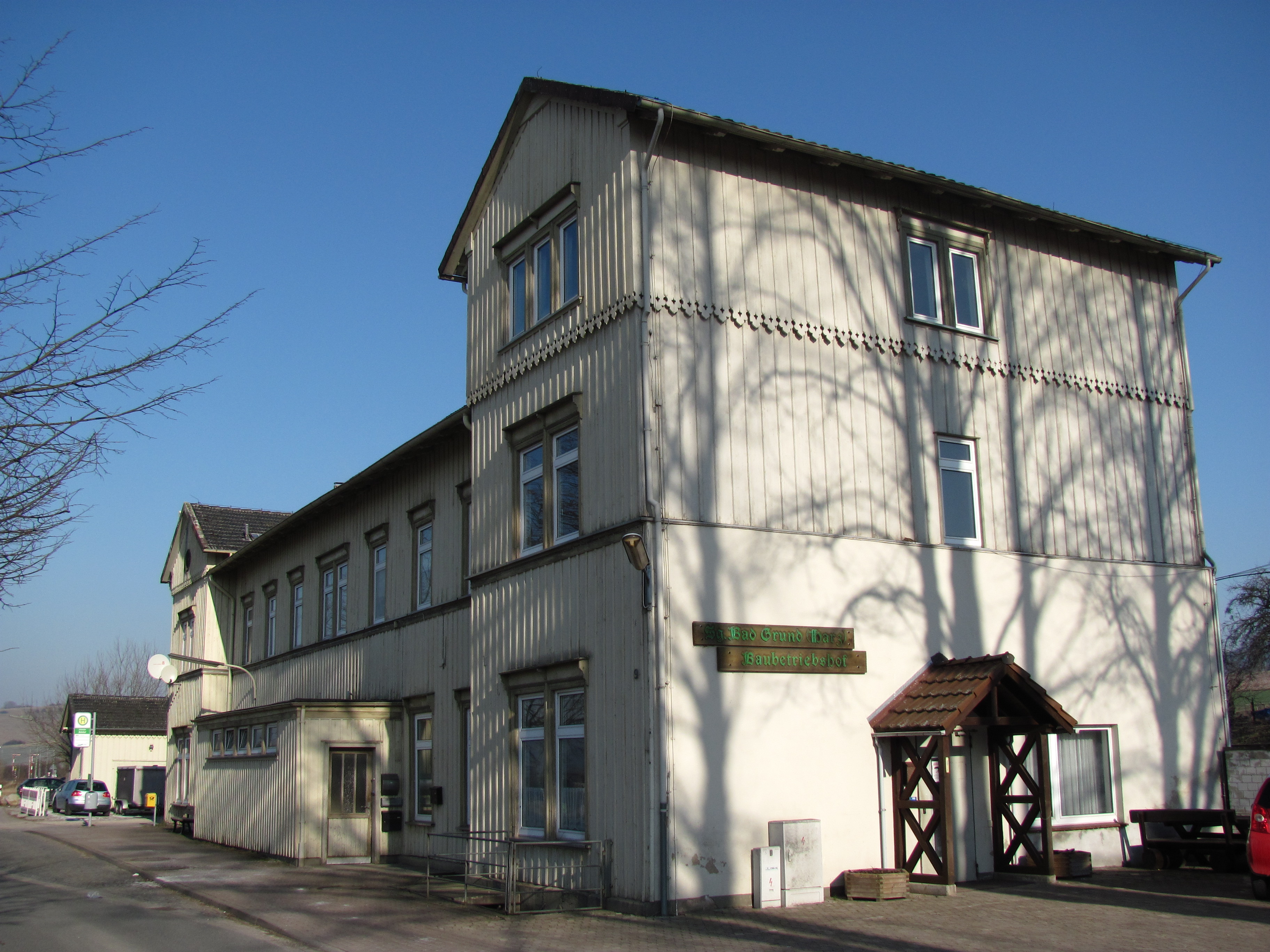
Historic railway station in Gittelde.

The line was opened in 1871 as a link between the South Harz Line and the Brunswick Southern Railway from Brunswick via Salzgitter to Kreiensen. It was planned as a long-distance route; and its trackbed laid for two tracks. This, however, did not materialise. Today it is operated as a branch line.

At the beginning of the 1990s the Herzberg–Seesen railway was threatened with closure. Since then, introducing of weekend services and of clock-face scheduling has made it significantly more attractive to travellers. In 2004 two new stops were opened in Osterode (O. Leege and O. Mitte) because the halts there were not particularly well sited. Some stations, e.g. the historic station built of wood in Gittelde, were renovated. In the medium term the line should be controlled from an electronic signal box in Göttingen which is currently under construction.

== Sources ==
- Ekkehard Eder: 125 Jahre Eisenbahnstrecke Seesen – Osterode – Herzberg, herausgegeben vom Heimat- and Geschichtsverein Osterode am Harz and Umgebung e. V., Osterode 1996
