= Konstal 105Na =

Unidirectional tramcar

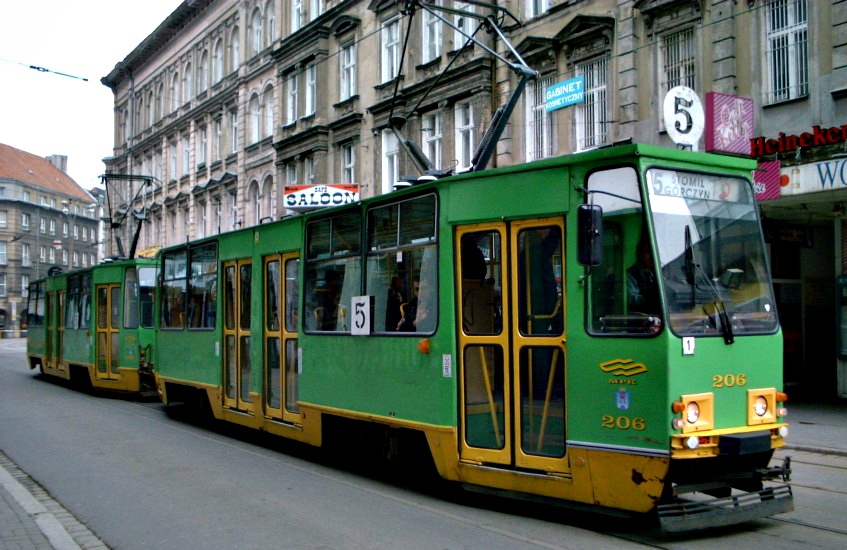
- Konstal 105Na in Poznań

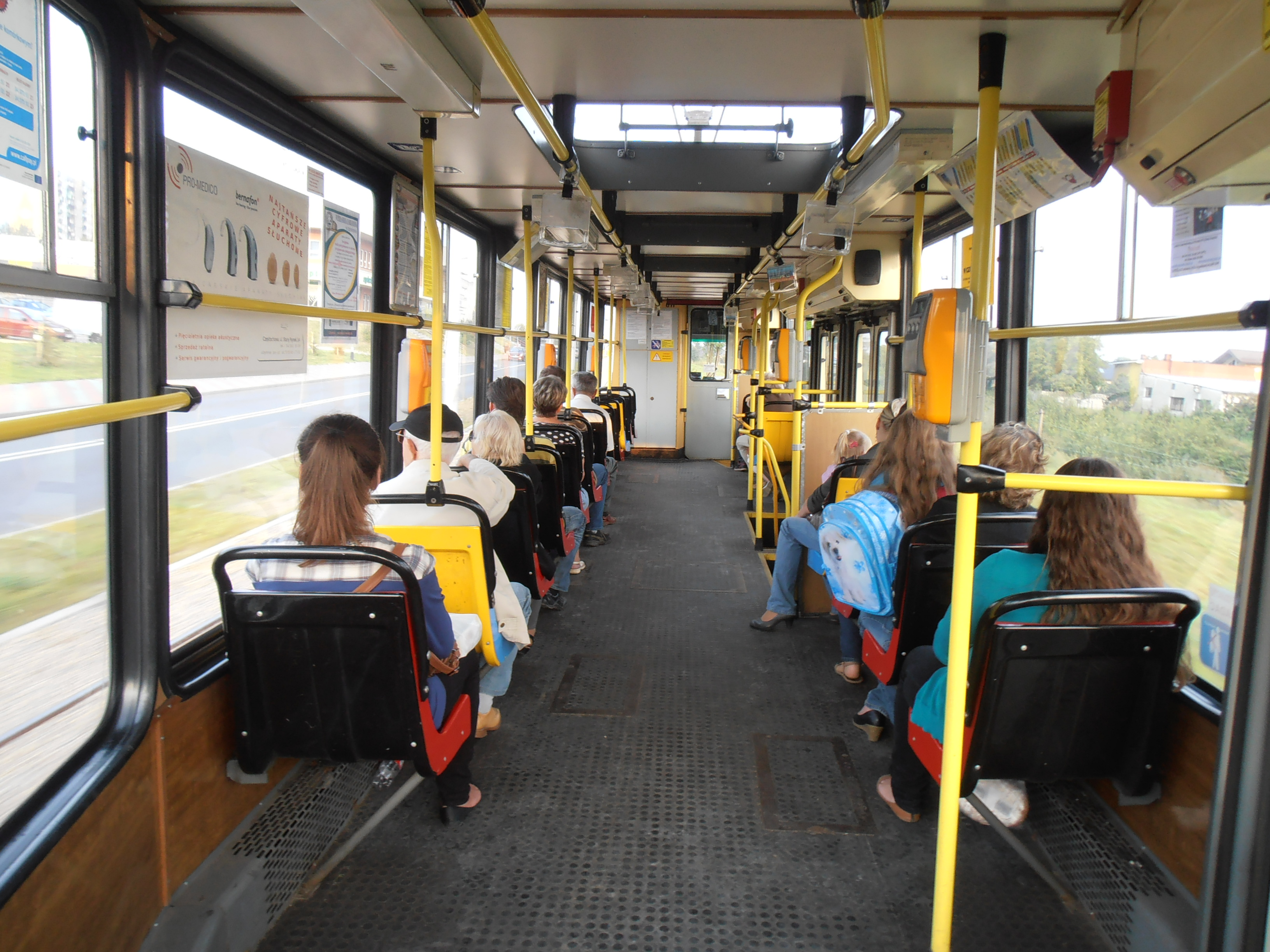
- Interior
- Manufacturer: (Poland) Konstal
- Built at: Konstal Chorzów
- Constructed: 1979-1992
- Entered service: 1979
- Number built: 2134
- Predecessor: Konstal 105N
- Capacity: 20 seats; 105 standing

Specifications
- Train length: 13,500 mm (44 ft 3 1/2 in)
- Width: 2,400 mm (7 ft 10 1/2 in)
- Height: 3,060 mm (10 ft 1/2 in)
- Floor height: 890 mm (2 ft 11 in)
- Doors: 4
- Maximum speed: 72 km/h (45 mph)
- Weight: 17,000 kg (37,000 lb)
- Prime mover: LTa-220
- Power output: 4 × 41.5 kW (56 hp)
- Electric system: 600 V DC
- Current collection: pantograph
- Bogies: 2
- Track gauge: 1,435 mm (4 ft 8 1/2 in), 1,000 mm (3 ft 3 3/8 in)

The Konstal 105Na are a class of Polish trams manufactured from 1979 to 1992 in the workshops Konstal Chorzów, Poland. The metre-gauge version is designated as 805Na. As of 2016 they were still the most common trams in Poland.

== Construction ==
105Na is unidirectional motor tramcar, equipped with four doors.

It is a development of the earlier Konstal 105N. The main changes being a shift in the location of the electrical equipment from under the steps to the back wall of the driver's cabin, the introduction of a separate cabin for the driver, as well as the removal of the small windows under the front and side windscreens. The most important change was the introduction of motor grouping, which reduced the energy consumption by 12%. During initial acceleration, the four motors are connected in series, whilst at higher speeds, two groups of motors are connected in parallel.

While in service, the 105Na vehicles were the subject of various modifications and upgrades (including changes in the electrical system, new front plastic, change of the door opening mechanism, and even re-design, for Poznań, to the bidirectional Konstal 105NaDK). Almost all 105N cars in Poland have over time been modernised to the 105Na standard.

== Other variants ==
The Konstal 105Na and 805Na trams provided the basis for the production of a large number of prototypes and variants:

- 105Nb - new doors and bogies, 15 units built in 1988-1993
- 105Nb/e - slightly modified electrical system, 6 units built in 1994
- 105Ne - slightly thicker walls, 18 units built in 1993
- 105Nf - modernised brakes and drivers console, 44 units built in 1994-1996
- 105Ng - three doors, static converter and modified breaks, 2 units built in 1993 additional units obtained by modernising 105Na
- 105Nm - similar to 105Nf but with a static converter, 14 units built in 1996-1997
- 105Np - static converter, single unit built in 1994
- 105NT - thyristor based, 13 units built in 1985–1989, later converted to standard 105Na
- 105Nz - thyristor based and asynchronous motor, 2 units built in 1997
- 105N1k - similar to 105Ng but thyristor based, 3 units built in 1995
- 105N1k2 - similar to 105N1k but with electrical systems from a different supplier, 60 units built in 1995-2000
- 105N2k2000 - similar to 105N1k2 with a plastic front and rear, 36 units built in 2001
- 106N - thyristor based, 7 units built in 1977–1987, later converted to standard 105Na
- 106Na - thyristor based, 8 units built in 1991-1993
- 805Nb - meter-gauge version of the 105Nb
- 805NS - meter-gauge with new accelerator, 12 units built in 1984-1990
- 111N - with doors on both sides - two 111N cars connected back-to-back could work as a bidirectional tram, 6 units built in 1993

== Production numbers ==
The number of standard-gauge version 105Na vehicles produced is 1443 while the number narrow-gauge version, the 805Na, is 691.

== Operators ==
These trams were used in all Polish cities which operate a tram system and they are the largest group in the stock.

=== Konstal 105Na ===
| Image | Operator | Number of 105Na in stock | Modernised variants |
|---|---|---|---|
| | MPK Częstochowa | 26 | |
| | ZKM Gdańsk | | 5 |
| | MZK Gorzów Wielkopolski | 4 | |
| | Tramwaje Śląskie | 81 | 107 |
| | MPK Kraków | 64 | 1 |
| | MPK Poznań | 26 | 40 |
| | Trams in Szczecin | 2 | 46 |
| | Tramwaje Warszawskie | 167 | 221 |
| | MPK Wrocław | 20 | 168 |

=== 805Na (Metere Gauge) ===
| Image | Operator | Number of 105Na in stock | Modernised variants |
|---|---|---|---|
| | MZK Bydgoszcz | 89 | 2 |
| | ZKM Elbląg | 12 | 4 |
| | MZK Grudziądz | 8 | 6 |
| | MPK Łódź | 134 | 236 |
| | MZK Toruń | 27 | 18 |

== Gallery ==
Konstal 105Na and variants

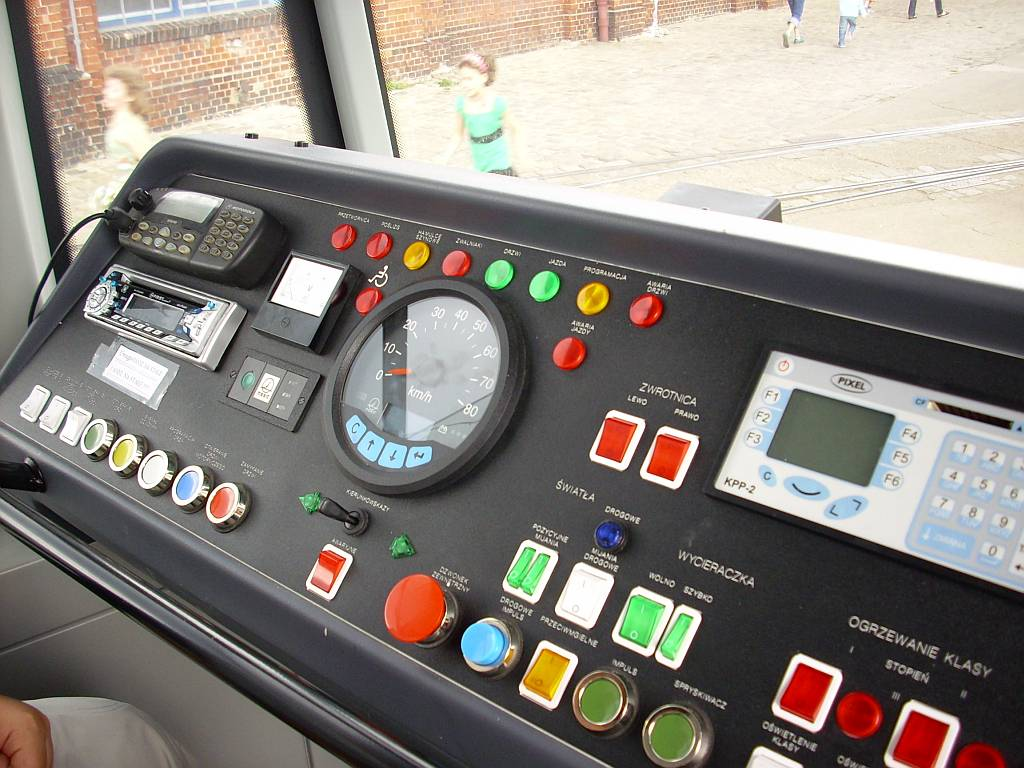
Cockpit of 105Na (new style)

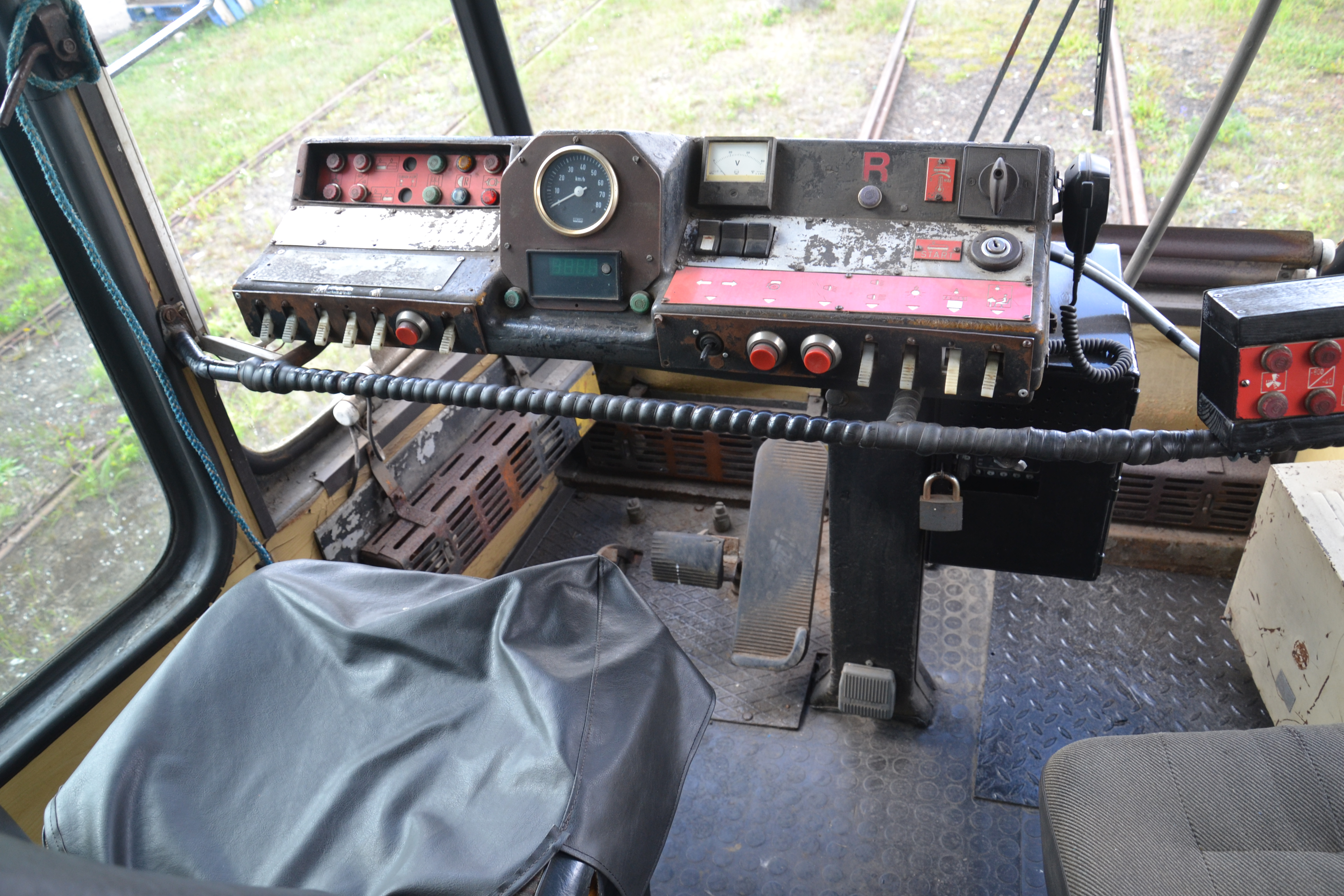
Cockpit of 105Na (old style)

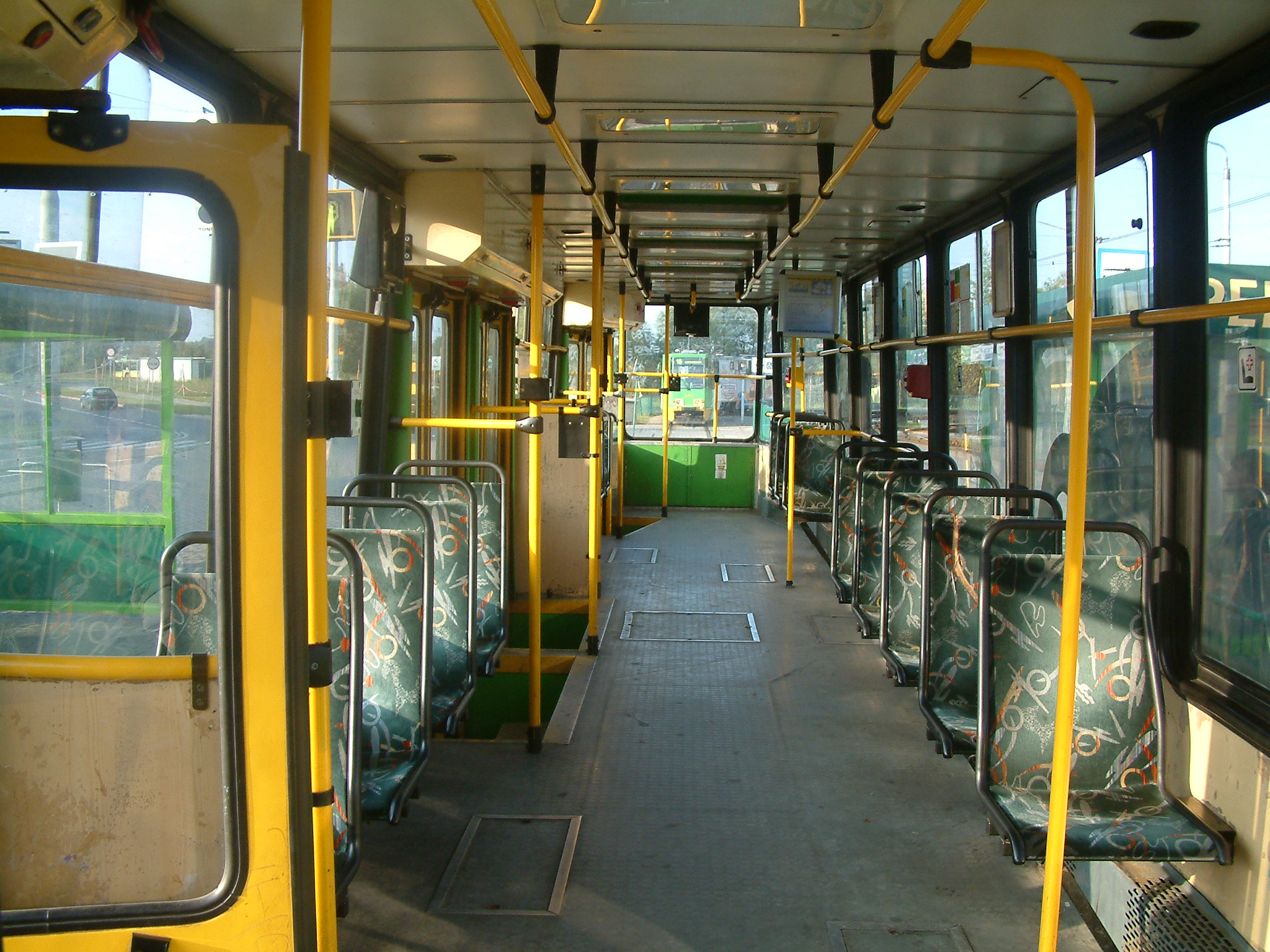
Interior

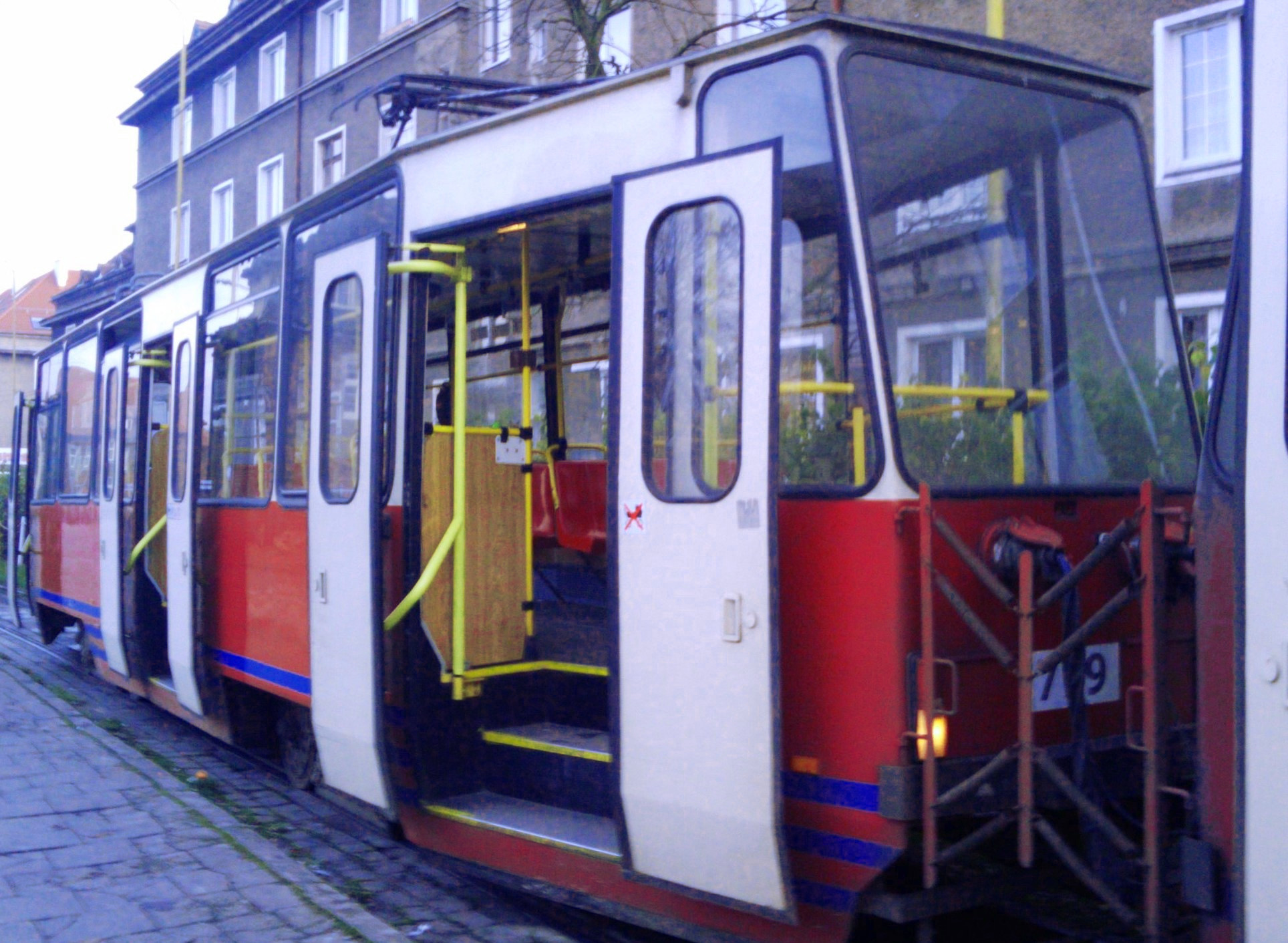
High floor is one of the main drawbacks of 105Na

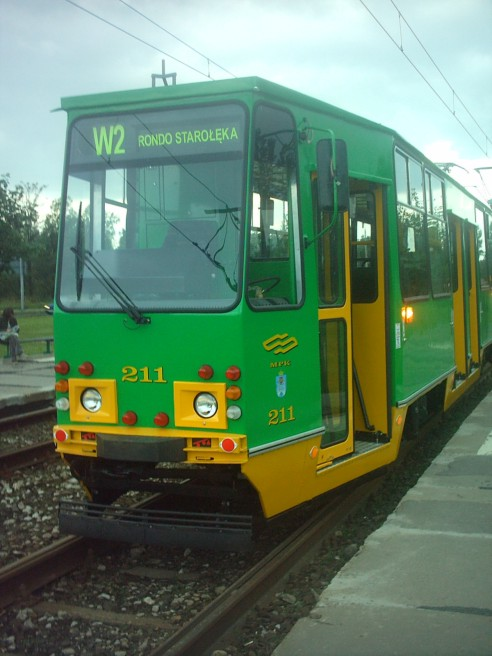
105NaDK - a bidirectional variant in Poznań

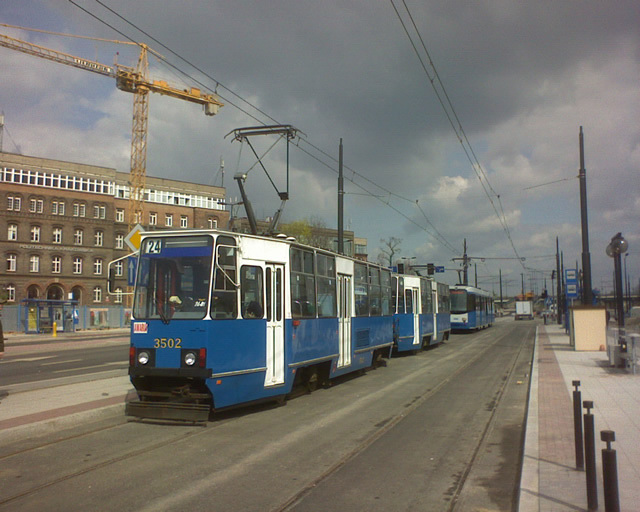
Konstal 111N with doors on both sides

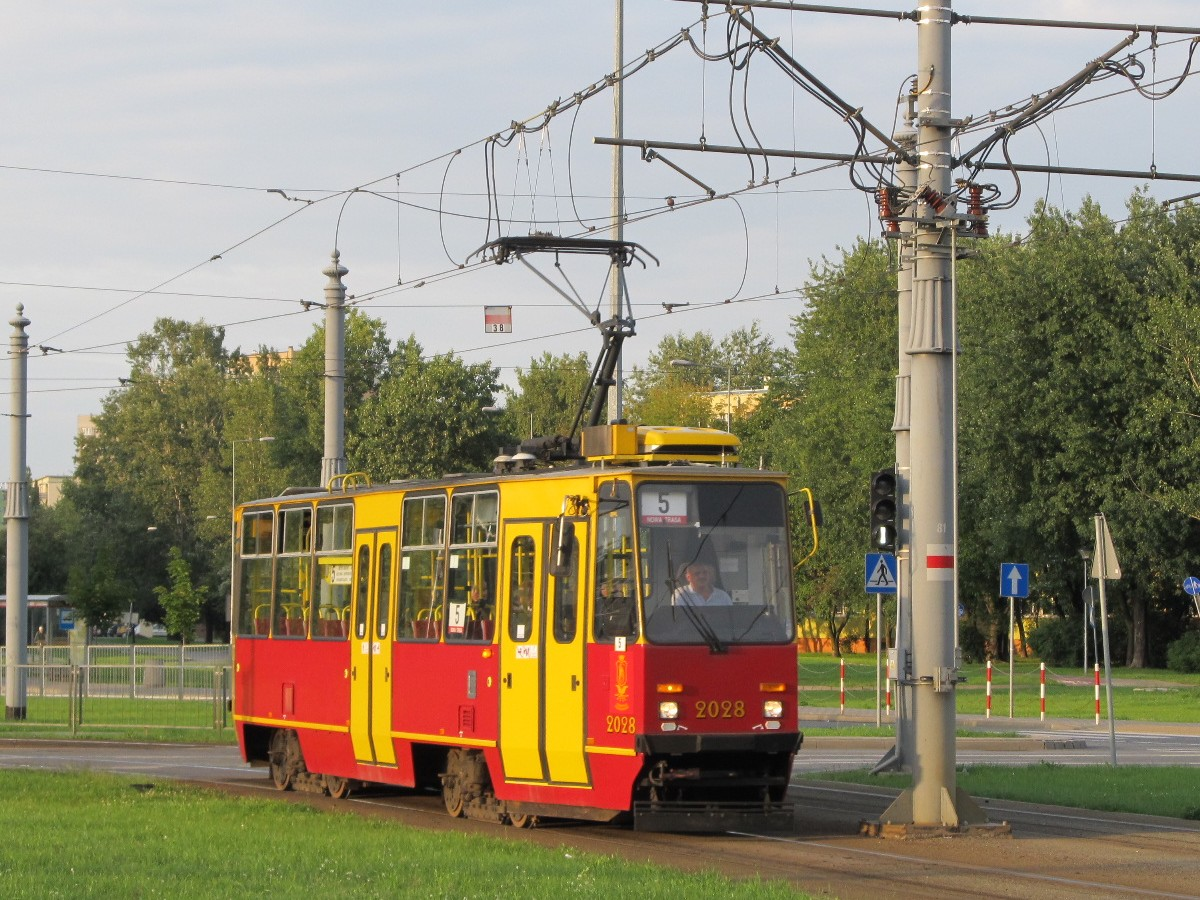
Konstal 105Nz

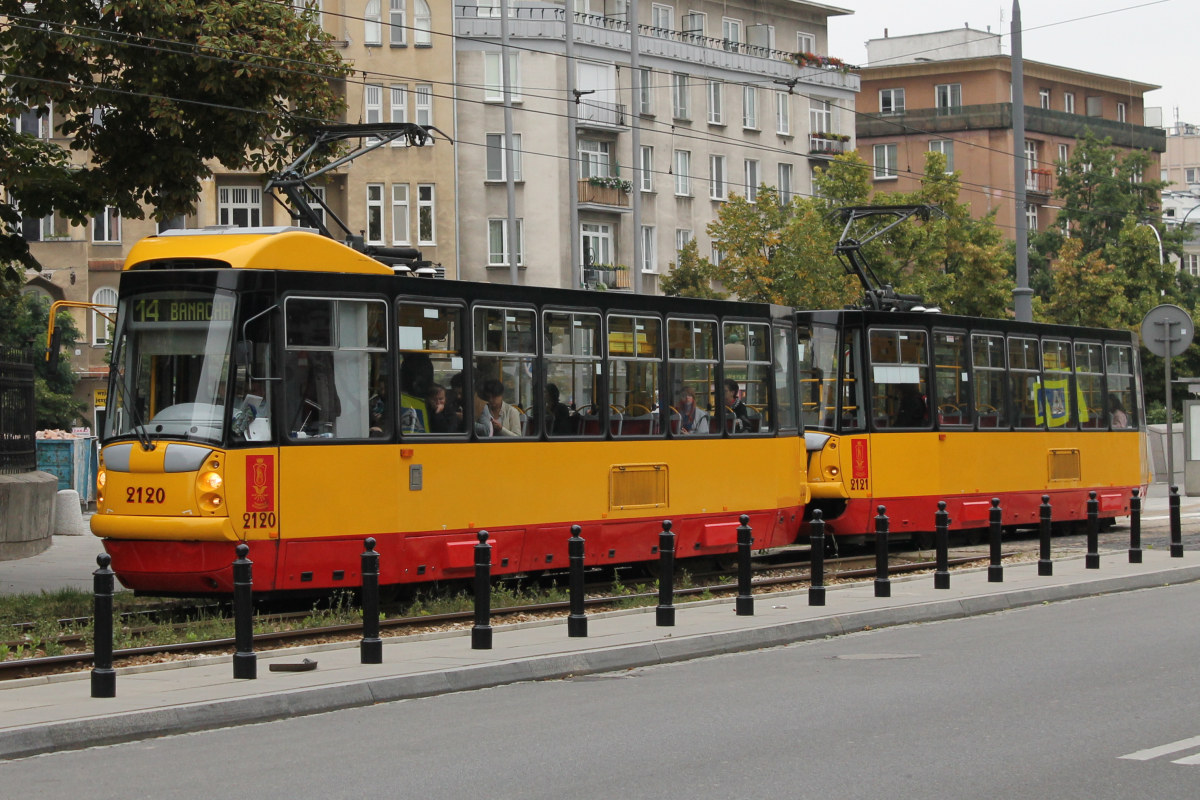
Konstal 105N2k2000 - one of the last produced

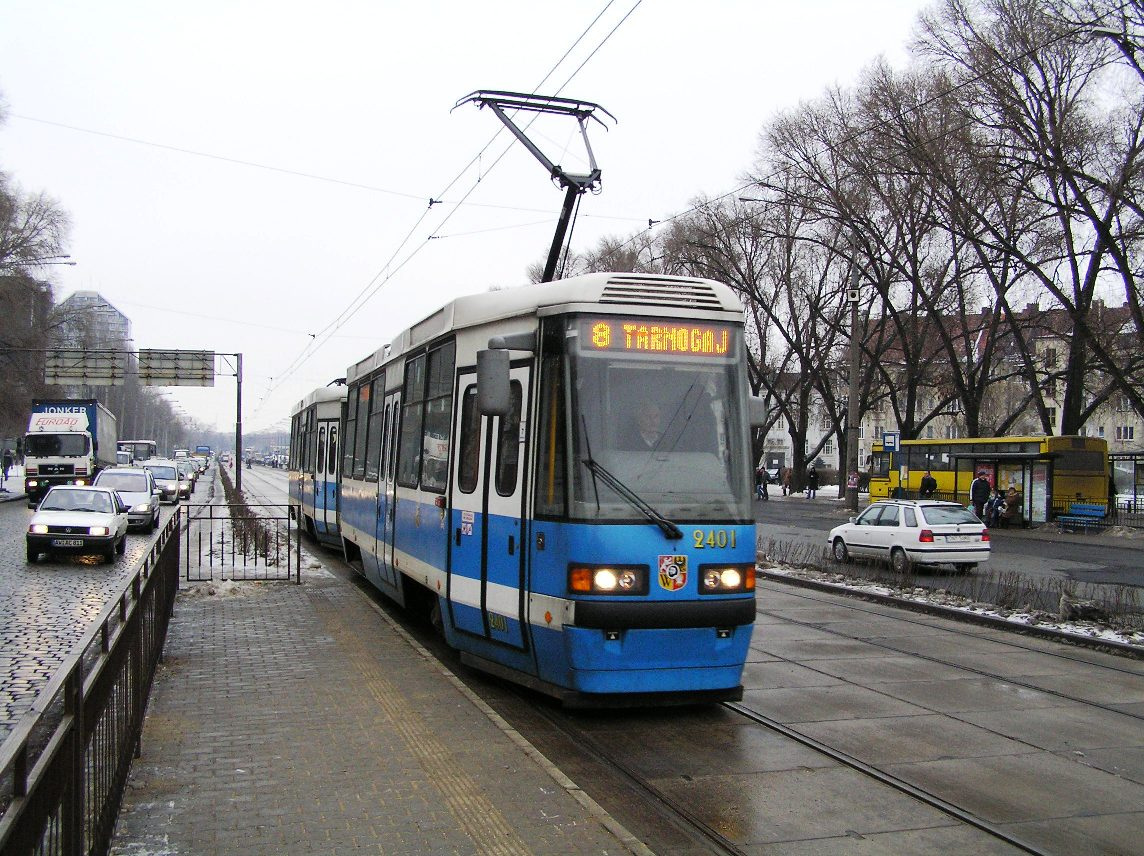
A modernised 105Na in Wrocław

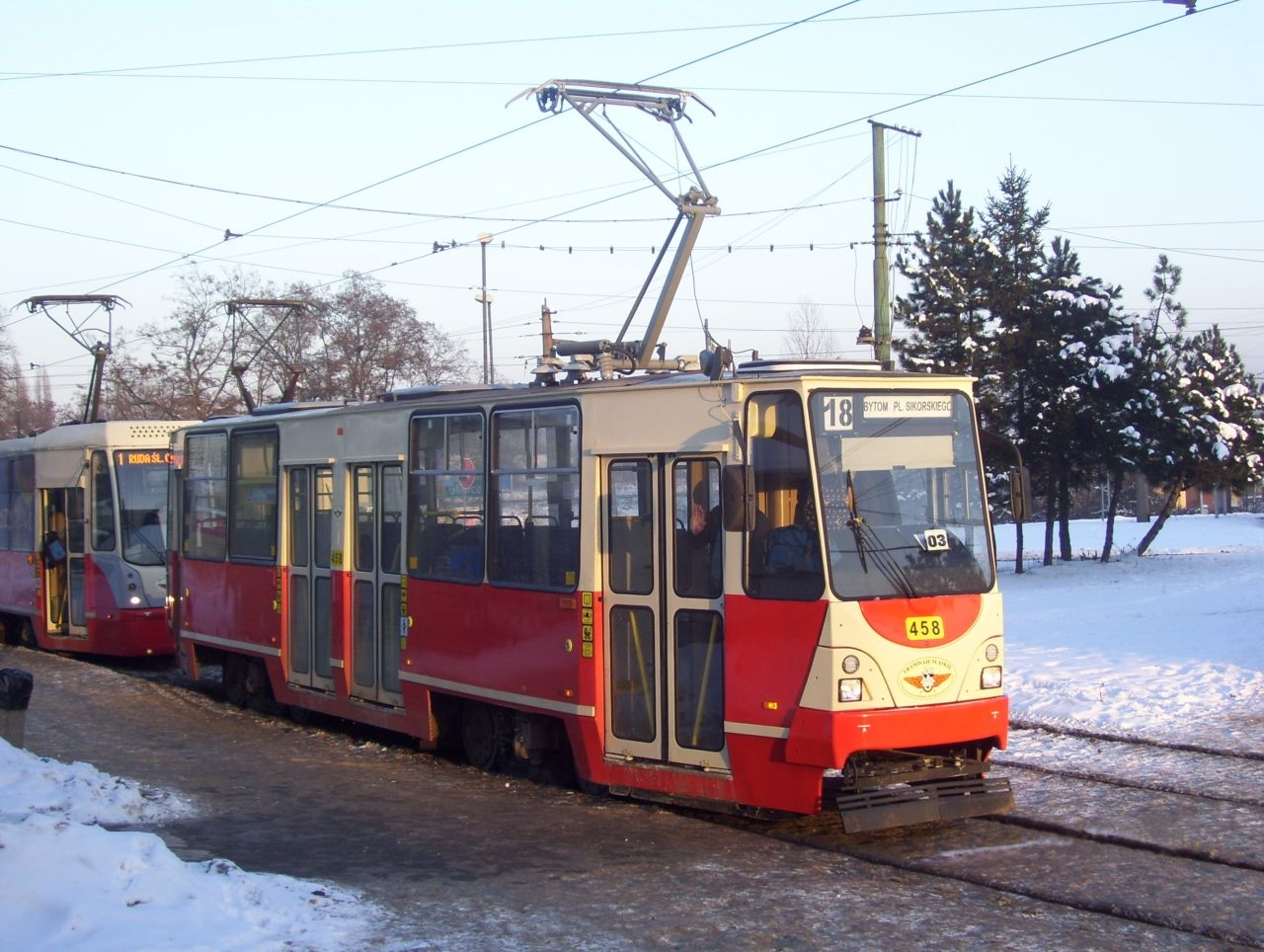
A modernised 105Na in Ruda Śląska

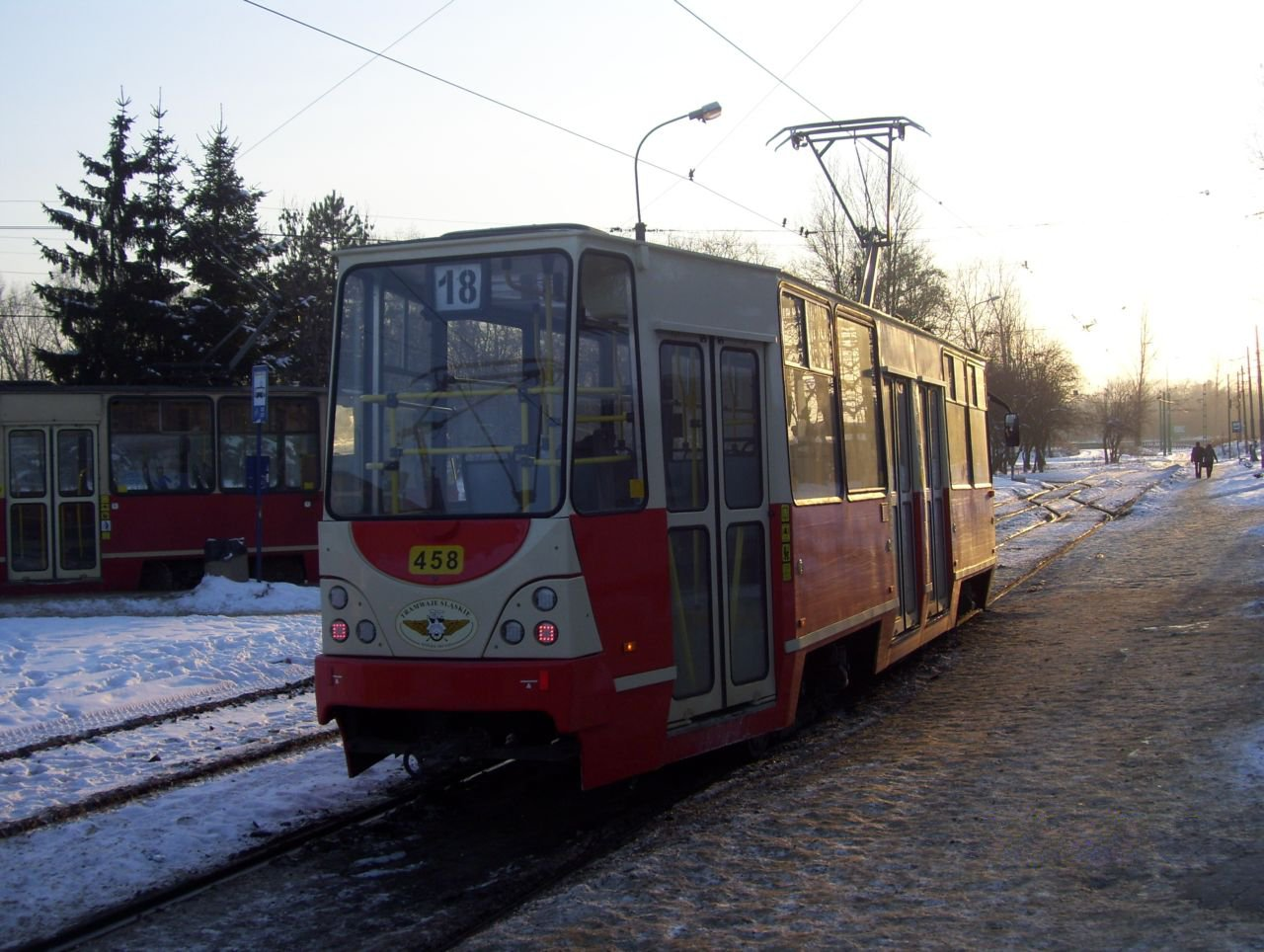
A modernised 105Na in Ruda Śląska - rear view

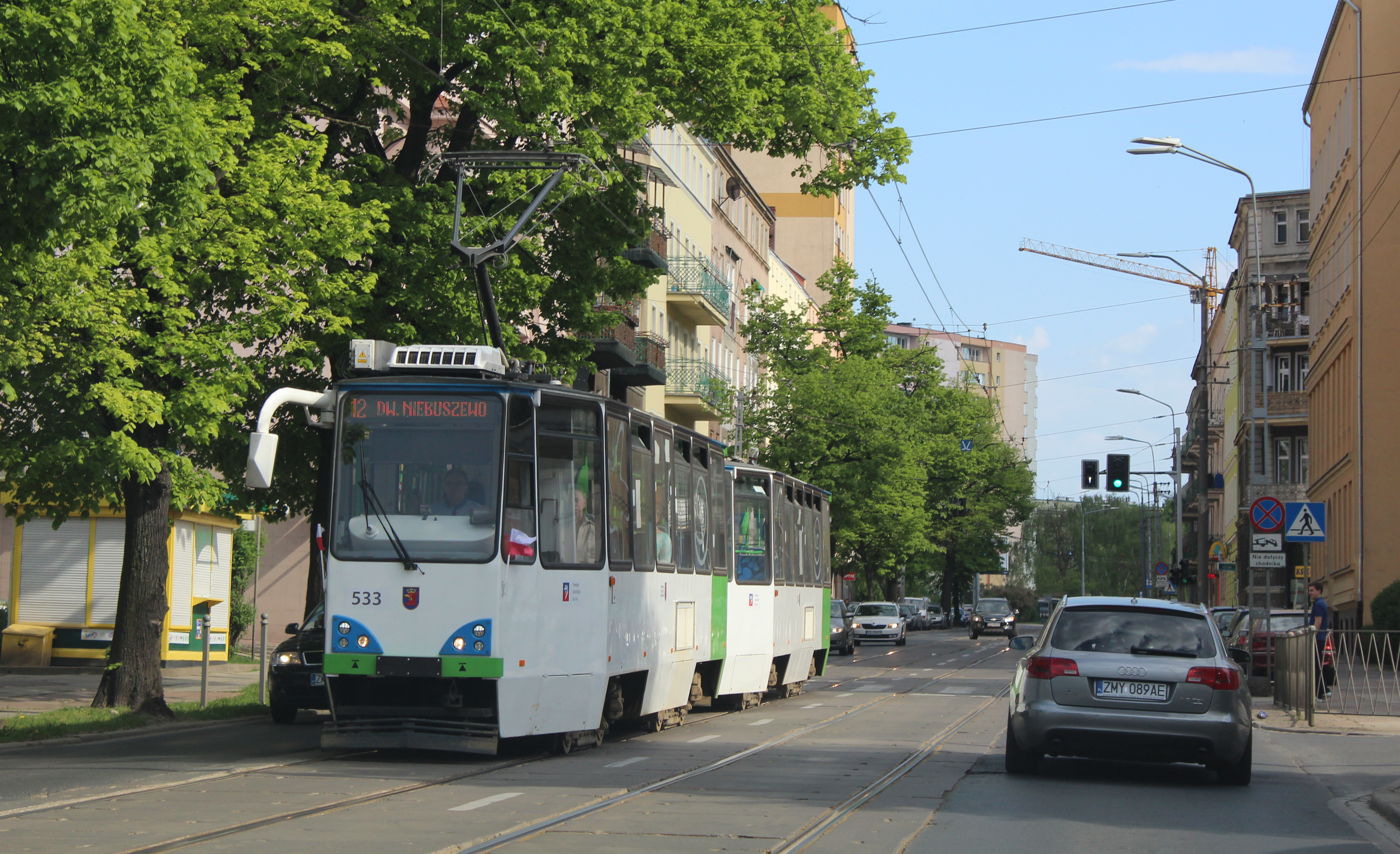
A modernised 105Na in Szczecin

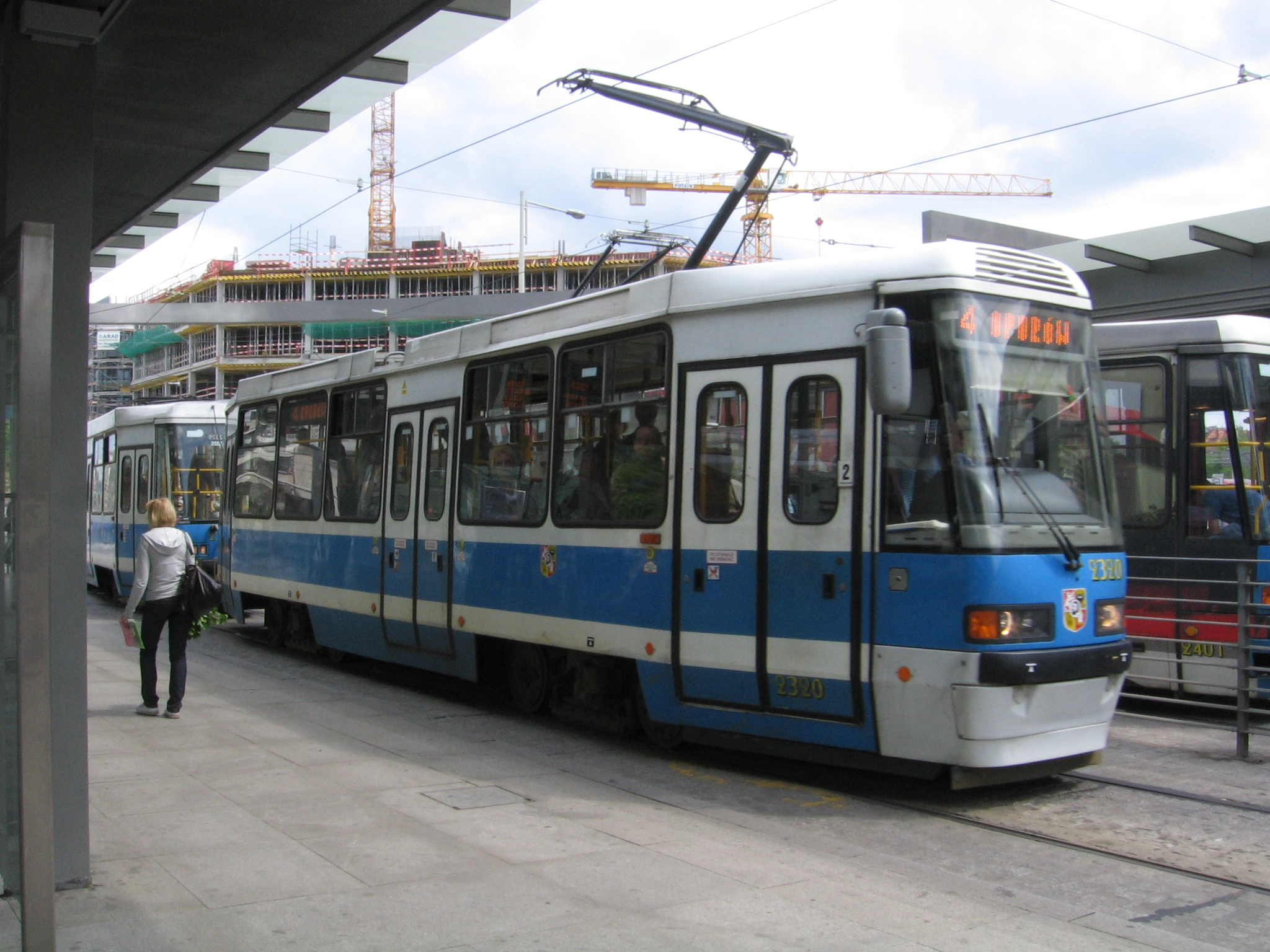
A modernised 105Na in Wrocław

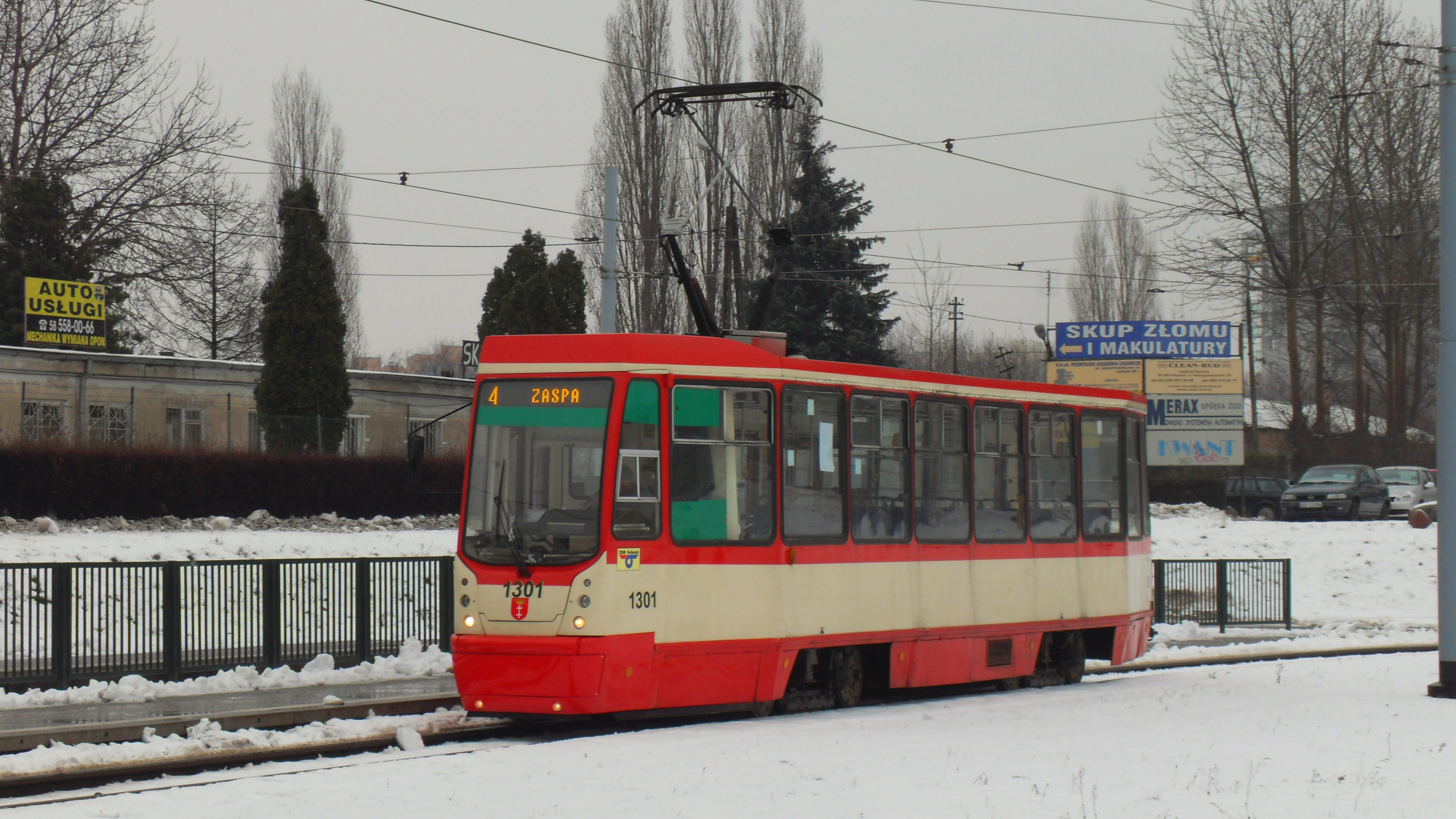
A modernised 105Na in Gdańsk

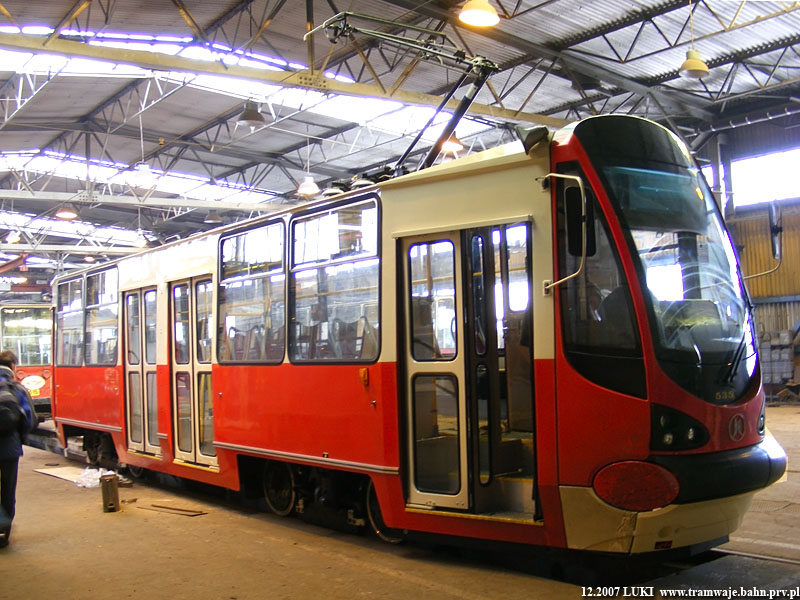
105Na undergoing modernisation

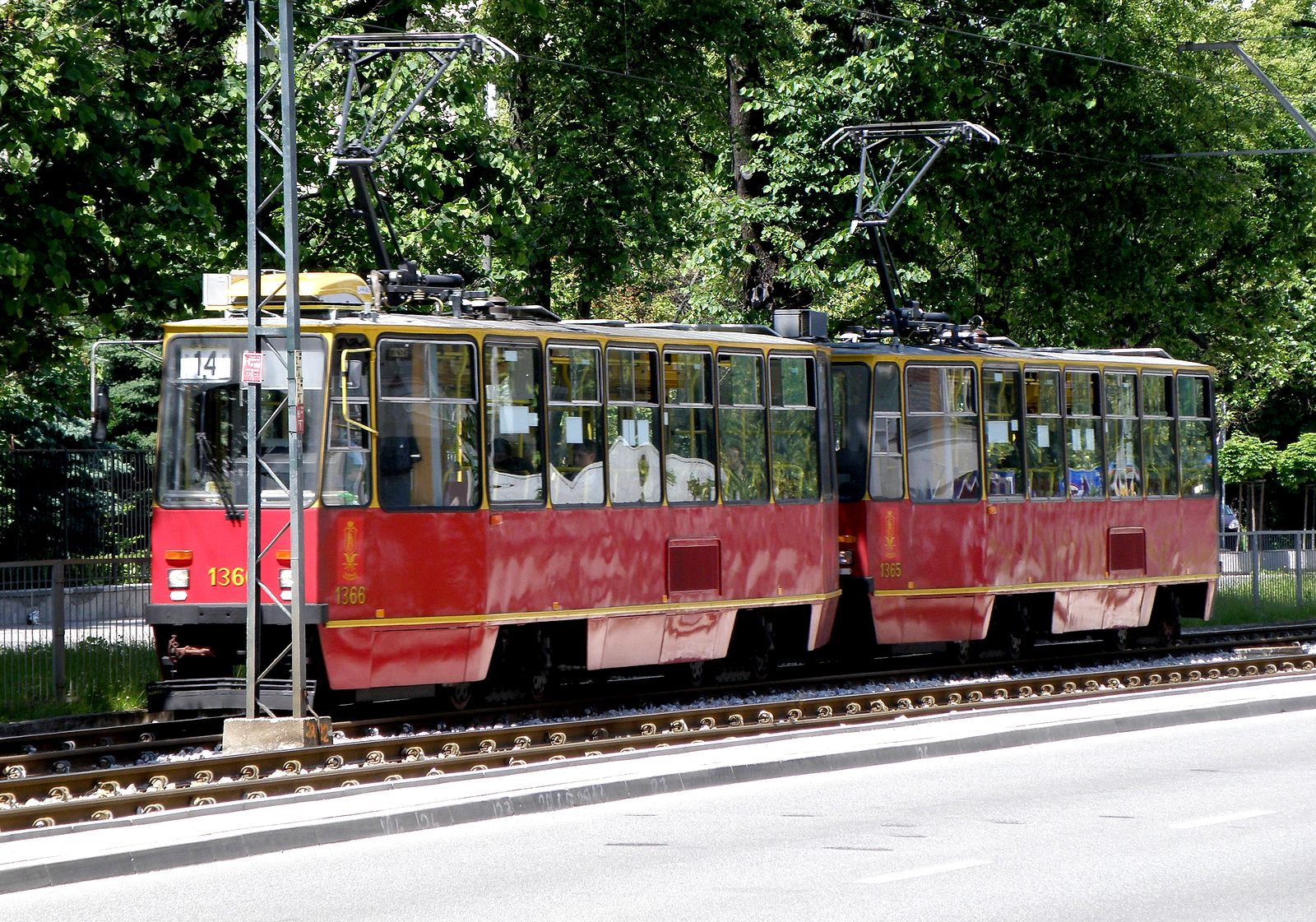
A Konstal 105Na in old...

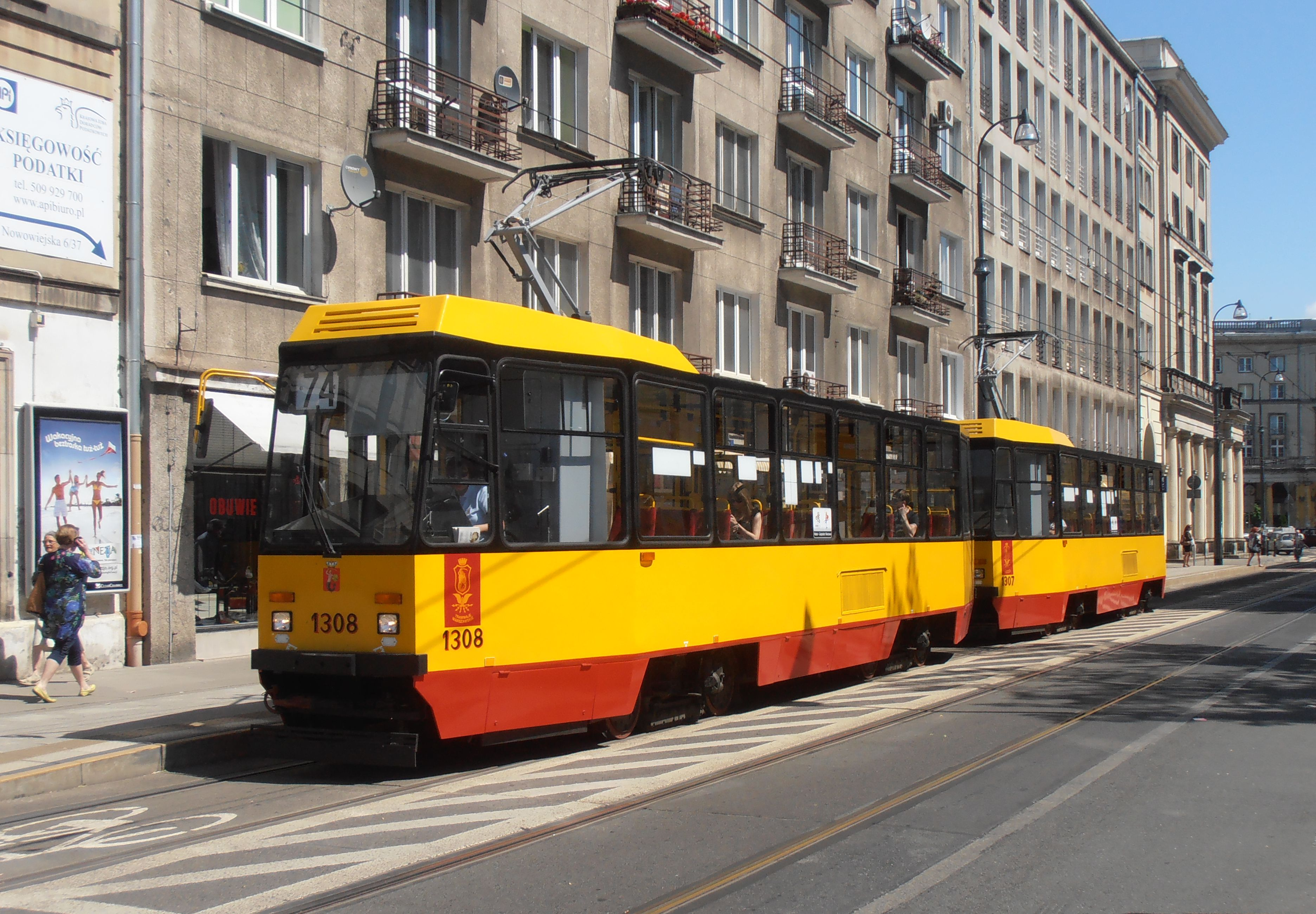
...and new Warsaw livery

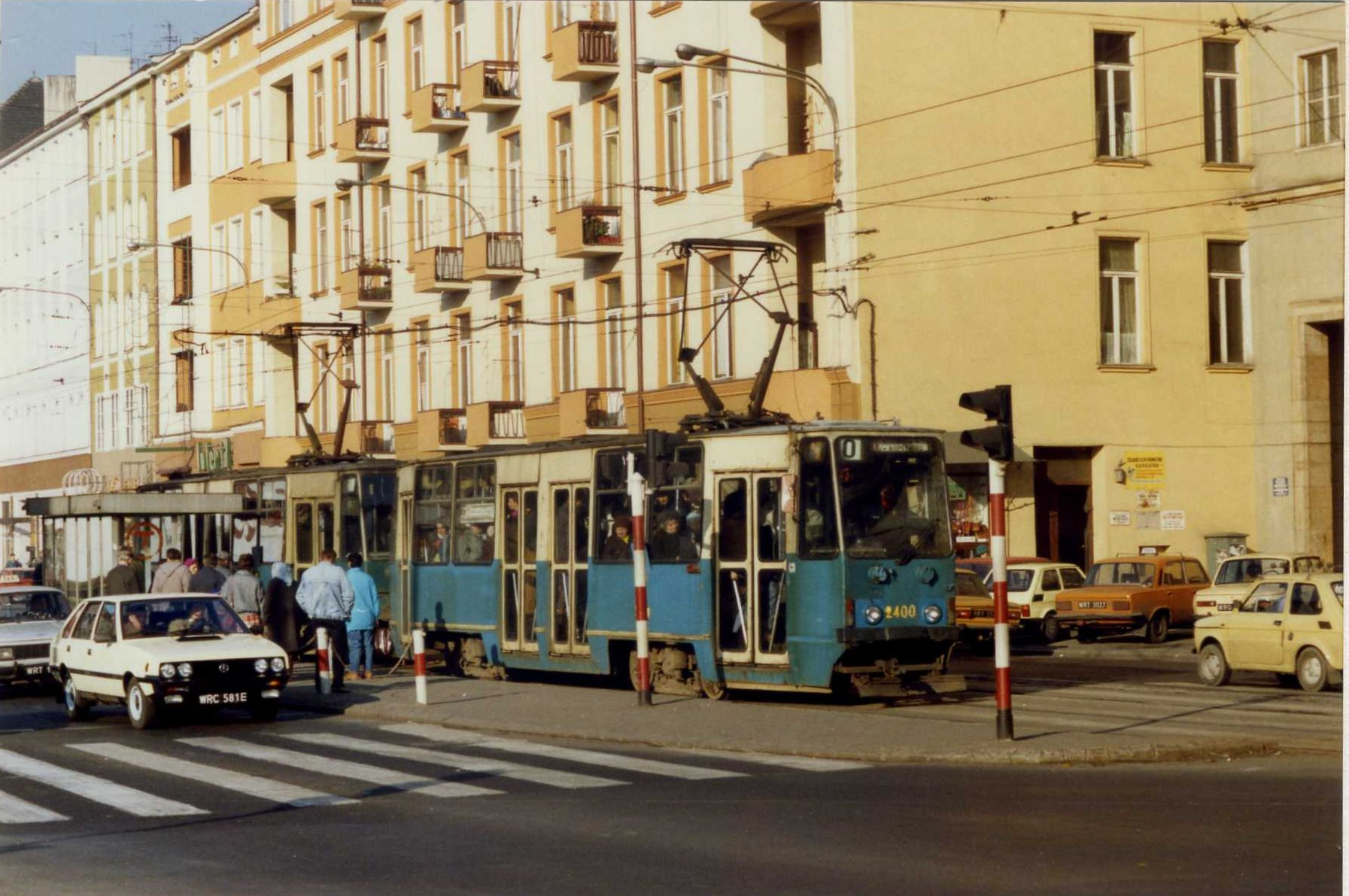
105Na in Wrocław in 1989

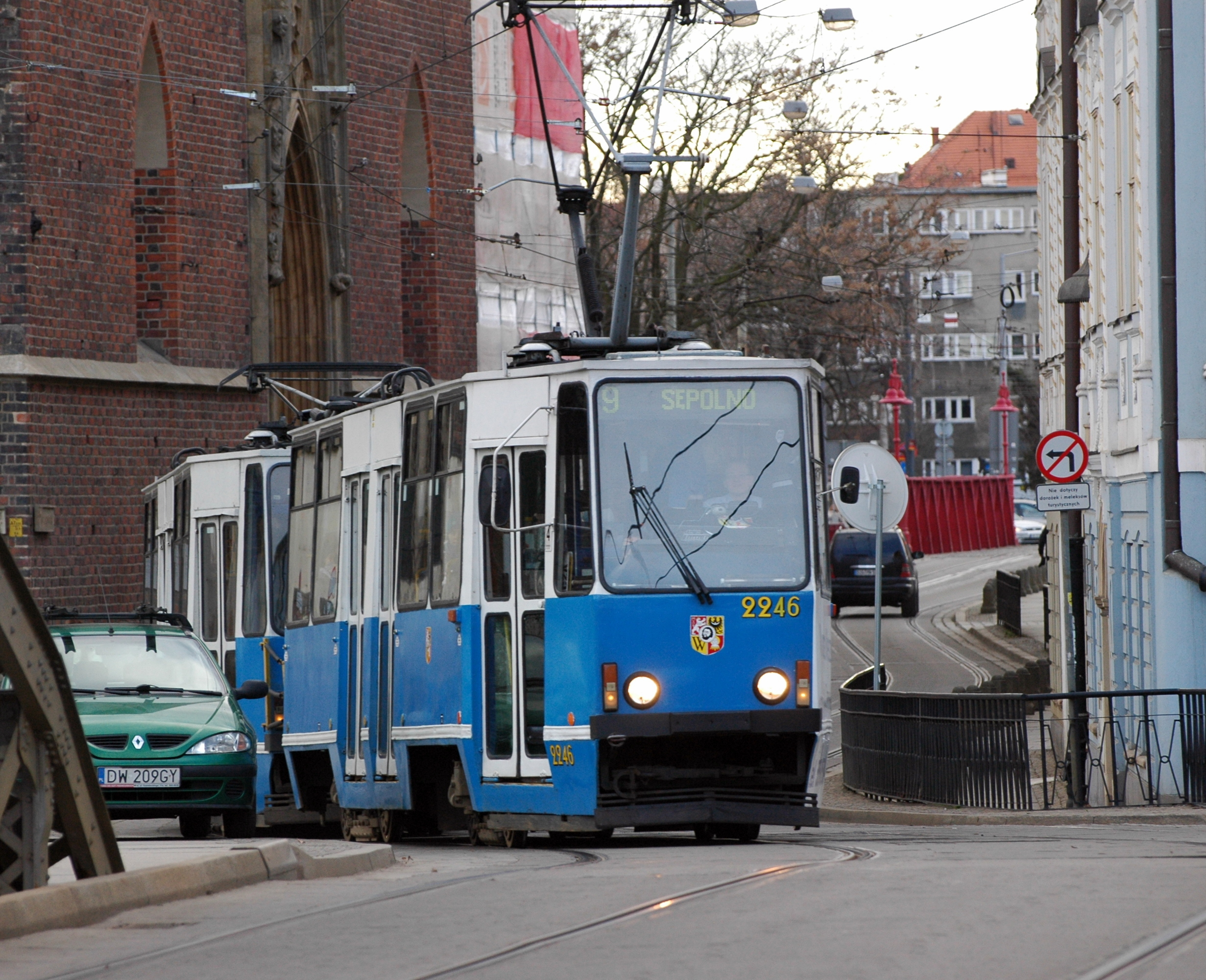
105Na in Wrocław, 2015

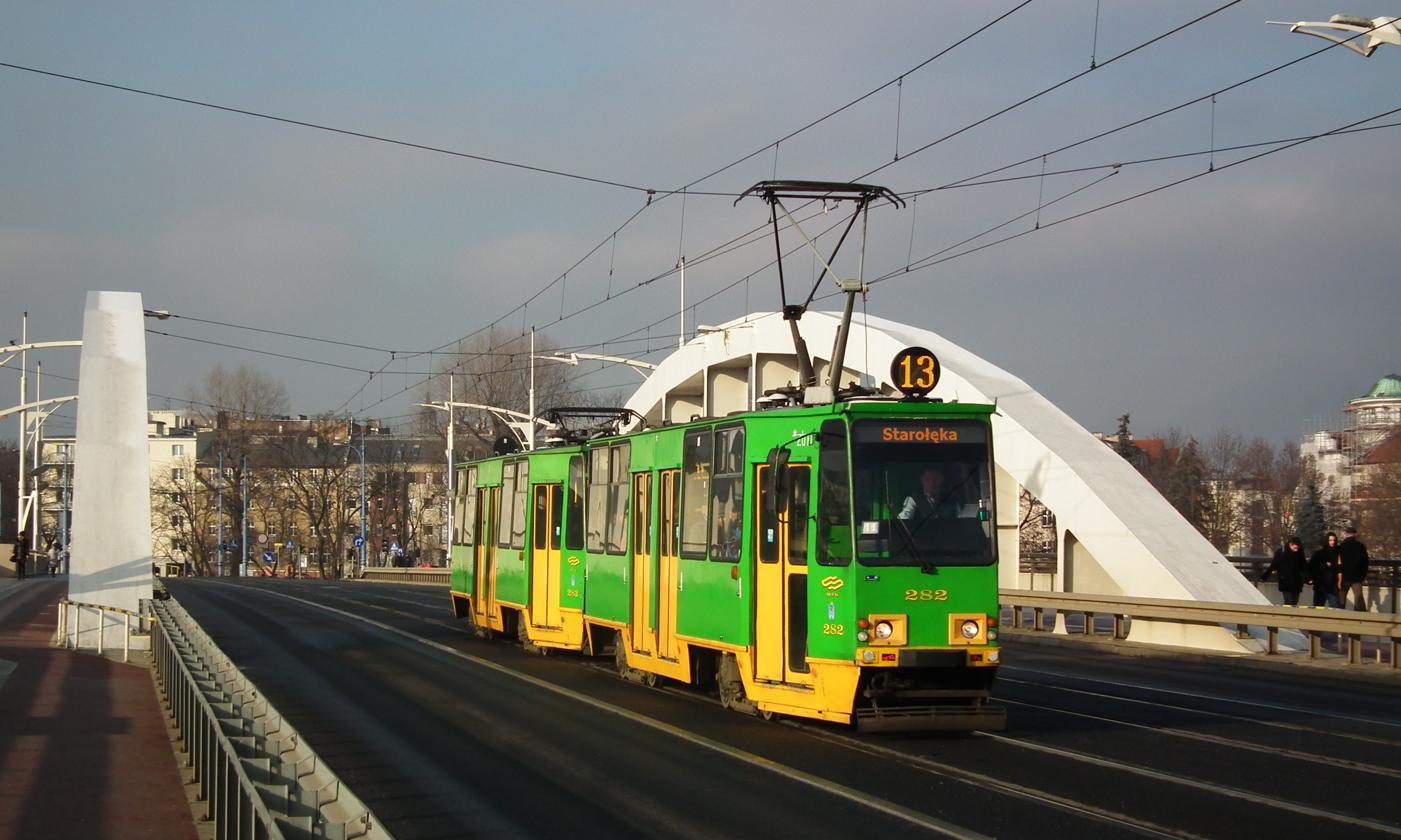
105Na in Poznań, 2015

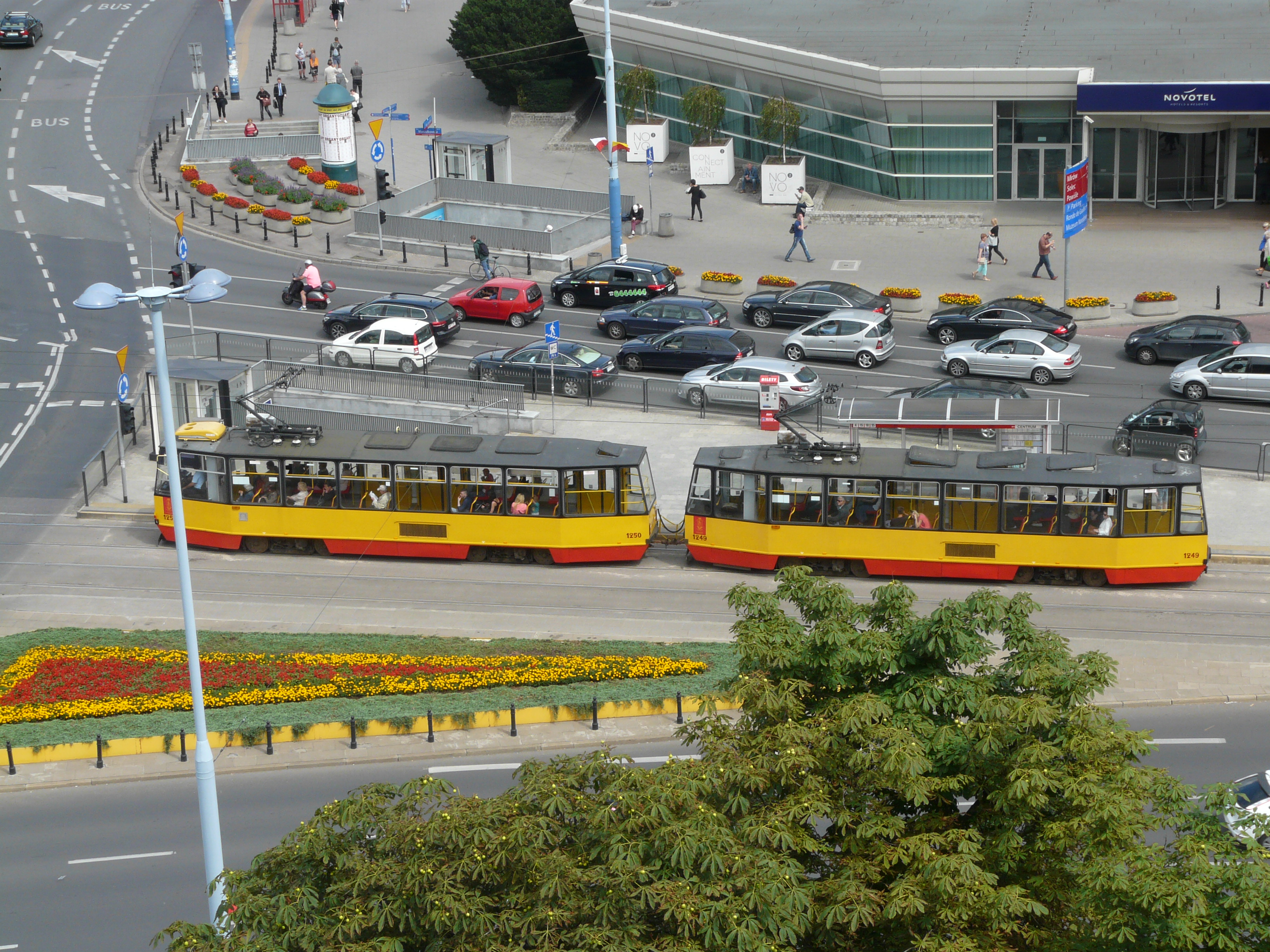
105Na in Warsaw, 2015

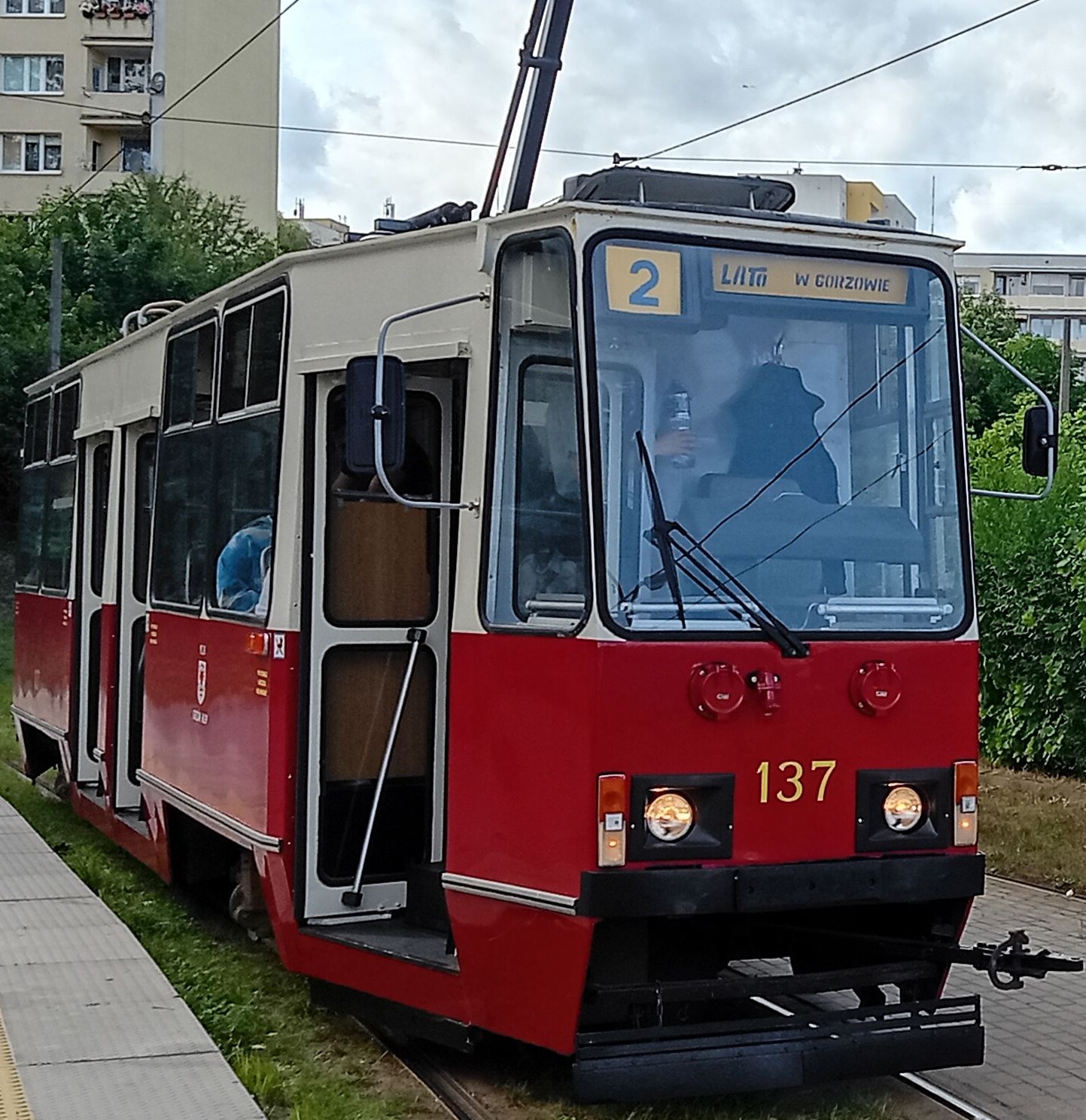
105Na in a heritage livery on a heritage run in Gorzów Wielkopolski, 2026

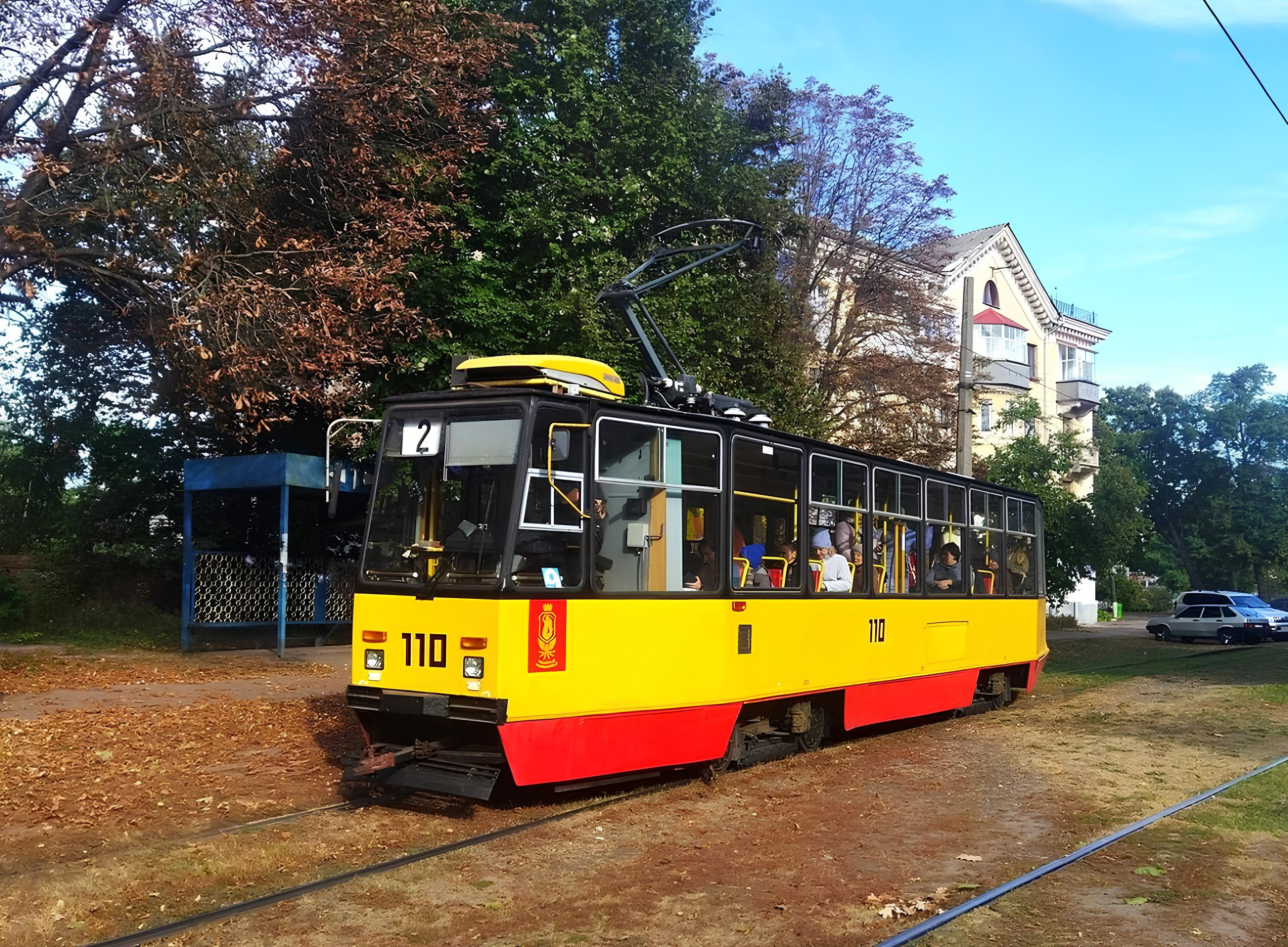
105Na in Konotop, Ukraine
