= Konstal 105Nb =

Polish tram

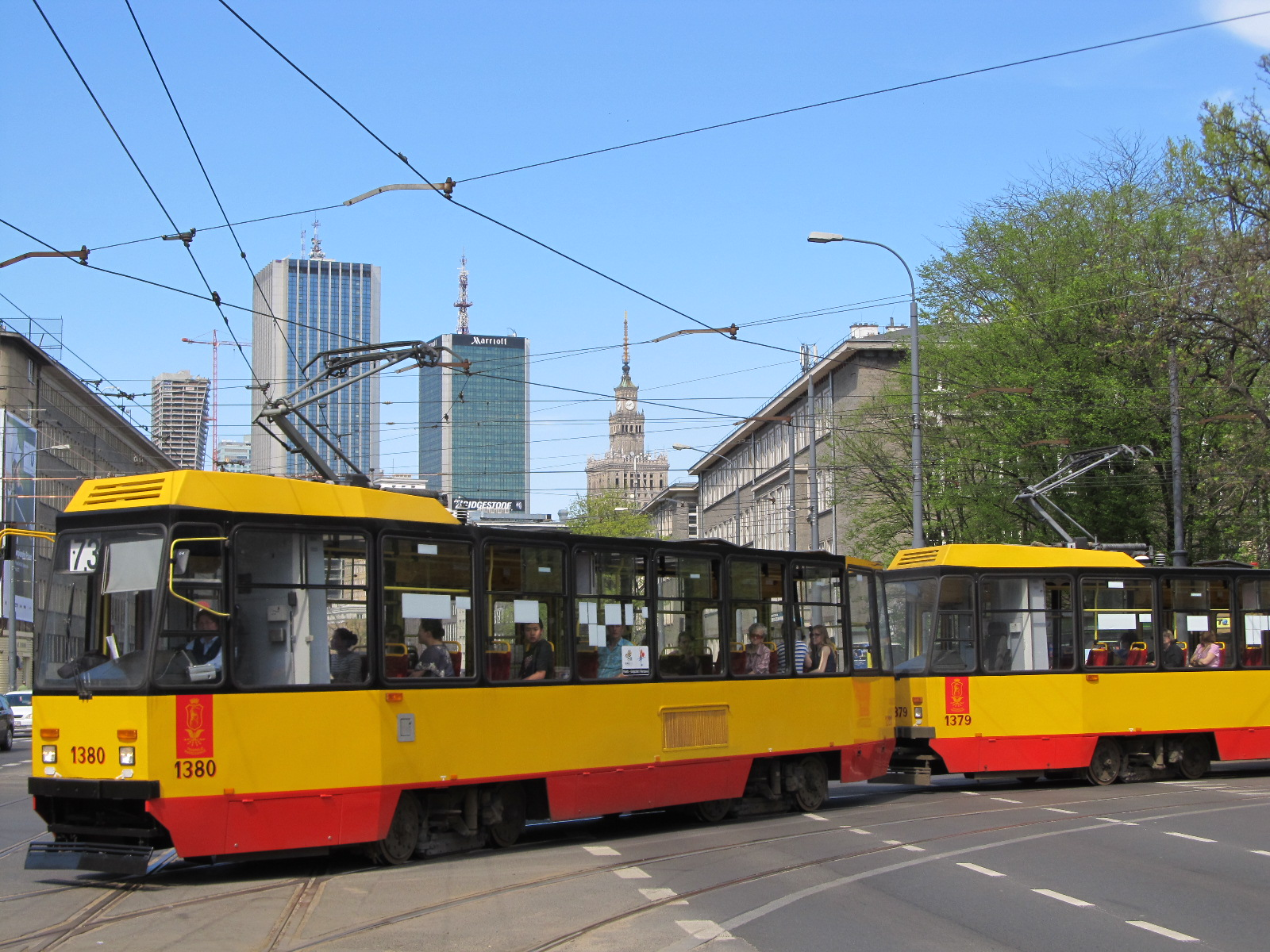
- Two-car set Konstal 105Nb #1380 and #1379 in Warsaw
- Manufacturer: Konstal
- Assembly: Chorzów; Poland
- Constructed: 1992–1993
- Capacity: 125

Specifications
- Train length: 13,500 mm (530 in)
- Width: 2,400 mm (94 in)
- Height: 3,060 mm (120 in)
- Low-floor: 0%
- Articulated sections: 1
- Weight: 17,000 kg (37,000 lb)

Konstal 105Nb is a tram that is a modernization of the Konstal 105Na design (with the narrow-gauge version designated as 805Nb), produced between 1992 and 1993. In 1992, as a result of modifications to the Konstal 105Na design, another model in the series was created, differing primarily in its electrical system and control panel. These trams were given a designation that had already been used for a prototype intended for Kraków.

In Warsaw, these trams proved to be unreliable, leading to their return to the manufacturer. In 1993, after a fire at the Grudziądz depot resulted in the loss of 12 tram cars (11 in regular service and one technical vehicle), the city's authorities were forced to replenish their fleet. Initially planning to purchase used rolling stock, they ultimately decided to acquire new trams. Konstal then sold the trams rejected by Warsaw's municipal administration.

== History ==
=== Origins ===
At the end of the 1960s, production of Poland's first modern trams, the Konstal 13N, came to an end, and work was underway on new tram models. Among numerous projects, only the Konstal 102N and its modified version, the Konstal 102Na, were successfully introduced. However, the production of these trams did not meet the growing demand. As a result, in 1973, the prototype of the Konstal 105N tram was developed. The model entered production in 1974 and was well received by transport authorities due to its modern design. Despite this, significant modifications were made just five years later, leading to the creation of the most popular model in the series, the Konstal 105Na.

=== Konstal 105Nb (1988) ===
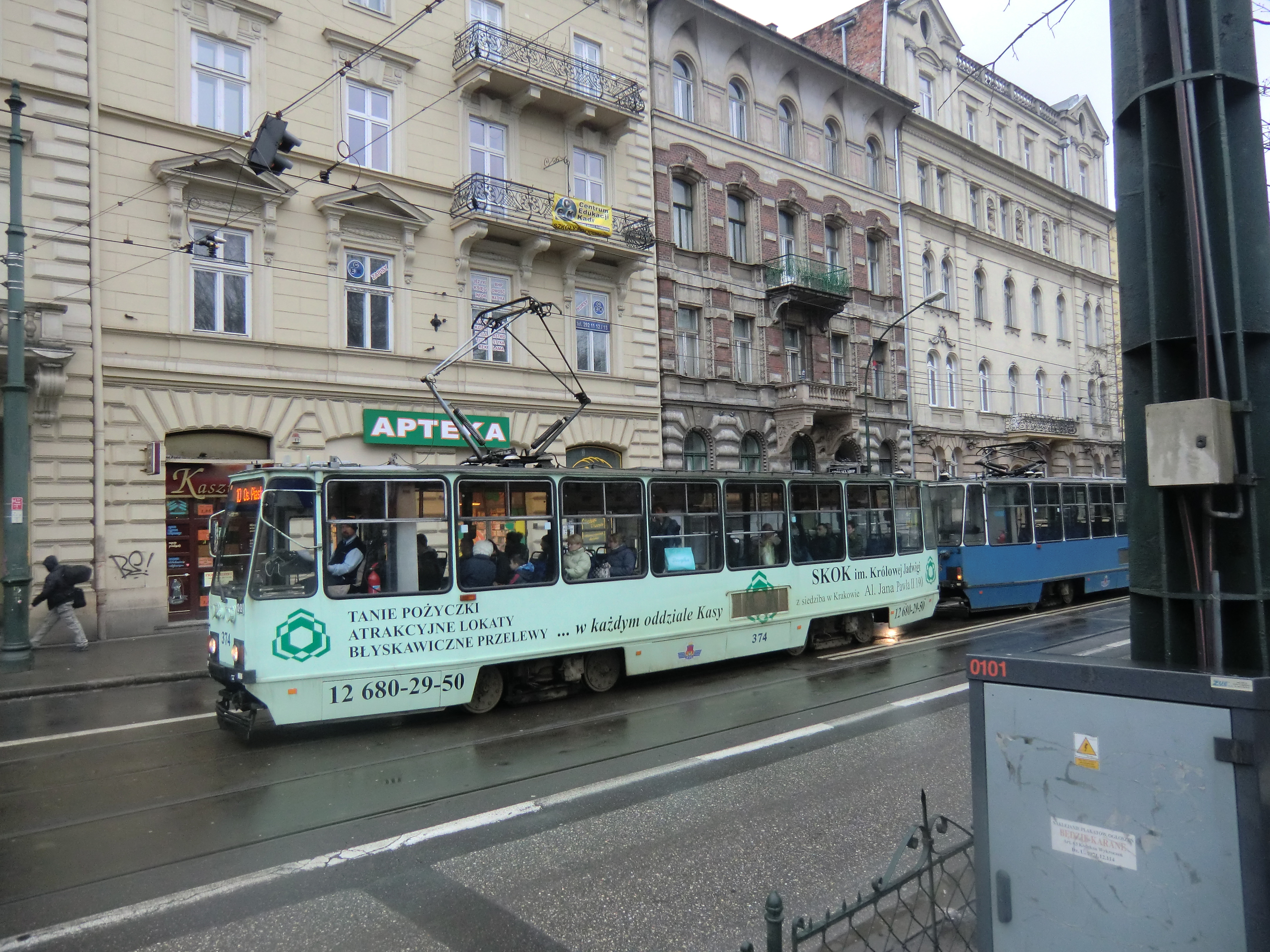
Konstal 105Nb from 1988 in Kraków

In 1988, further modifications were made to the design, leading to the construction of a single prototype tram, the Konstal 105Nb. This model featured an enlarged driver's cab and new ventilation hatches. The prototype was delivered to Kraków, but no further production followed.

=== Konstal 105Nb (1992–1993) ===
In 1992, the authorities in Warsaw decided to modernize the tram fleet. In response, Konstal developed a new type of tram within the 105N family. This new model featured a different electrical system, a new type of bogies, door-opening buttons, and redesigned seats. Despite these significant modifications, the trams were still designated as Konstal 105Nb, even though they were not the same project as the 1988 prototype for Kraków. According to previous naming conventions, they should have been designated as Konstal 105Nc. A total of 14 trams of this series were produced, all of which were sold to the Warsaw municipal government and assigned fleet numbers in the range of 1379–1392 (the last tram was not accepted by the purchaser). After a few months of operation, MZK Warsaw reported multiple issues and returned the trams to the manufacturer.

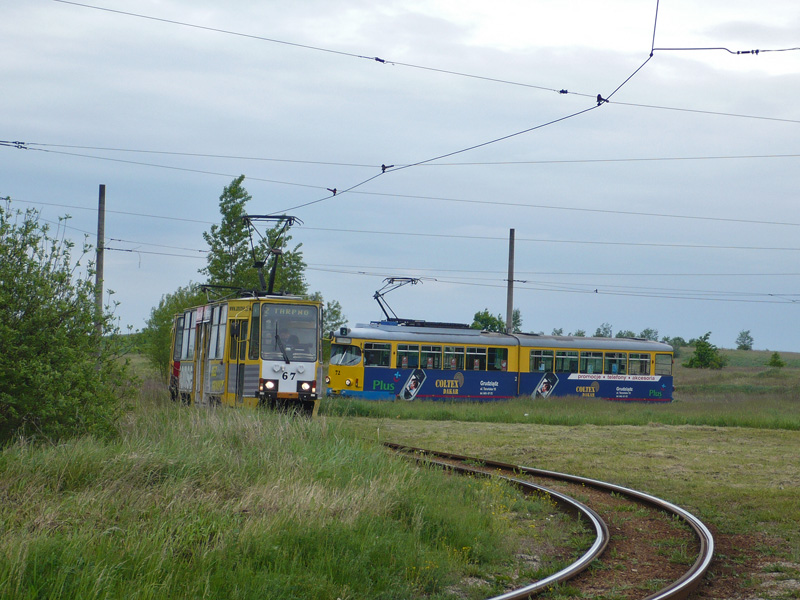
Konstal 805Nb #67

On 5 September 1993, a fire at the Grudziądz depot destroyed 12 trams (11 in service and one technical vehicle). To address the resulting shortage, Grudziądz initially considered leasing retired Konstal 803N trams from Bydgoszcz. However, due to their age (20 years) and different specifications, the local transport operator decided against their further use. Instead, with financial support from the Toruń Voivodeship, Grudziądz purchased new trams for the municipal transport company. Six Konstal 105Nb units were acquired from the manufacturer. However, these were not new vehicles but rather refurbished trams that had been rejected by Warsaw (the trams delivered to Warsaw were newly manufactured.) The Grudziądz trams received new identification plates, likely to facilitate their rapid delivery.

The trams arrived in Grudziądz between late 1993 and early 1994 and were assigned fleet numbers 63–68. Initially operated as single units, they were later paired up for service on Line 2. Around the year 2000, the trams were fitted with PIXEL destination displays. MZK Grudziądz also modified them by installing a high-voltage cable, allowing the entire set to be powered from a single current collector.

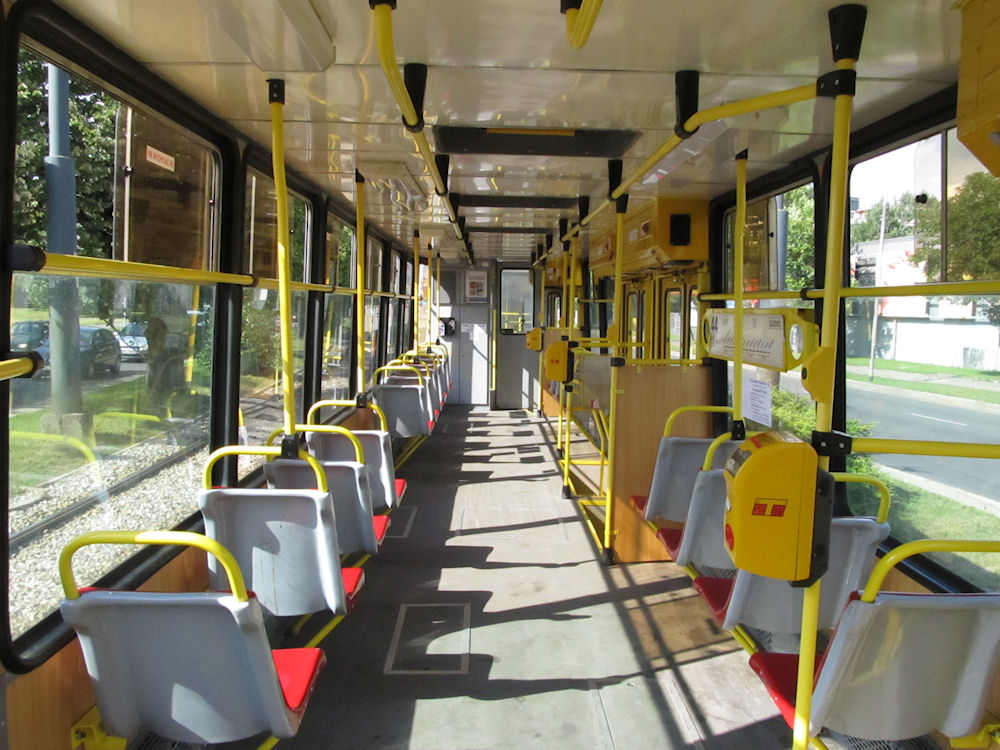
Interior of the Warsaw 105Nb tram

The trams that were redelivered to Warsaw functioned correctly after modifications. In 2002, one tram (1382) was decommissioned after being damaged in a collision. During the first major overhaul, doors were replaced with IFE-type models, and a half-current collector was added. In 2004, tram number 1381 was rebuilt as a 105Na.

=== Konstal 105Ne ===
In 1993, the Konstal 105Ne model was developed based on the 105Nb. It included all the modifications of the 105Nb as well as additional improvements. All trams of this type were purchased by MZK Warsaw.

== Construction ==
The Konstal 105Nb trams are an evolution of the Konstal 105N series, with the vast majority of components coming from the earlier Konstal 105Na tram. The differences compared to the Konstal 105Na include:

- Replacement of the bogies with double-sprung type 2 NNa bogies,
- Use of Bumar-type 20PMa transmission,
- Installation of Bode door drive,
- Replacement of door wings with aluminum ones featuring a single pane of glass,
- Powder coating of the car body,
- Addition of door-opening buttons (during modernization, buttons were also added to earlier vehicles in the Konstal 105N family),
- Replacement of the control desk,
- Modification of the electrical system,
- Addition of a rear maneuvering platform (with a speedometer).
