= Trams in Częstochowa =

Tram system in Częstochowa, Poland

- Tramwaje w Częstochowie
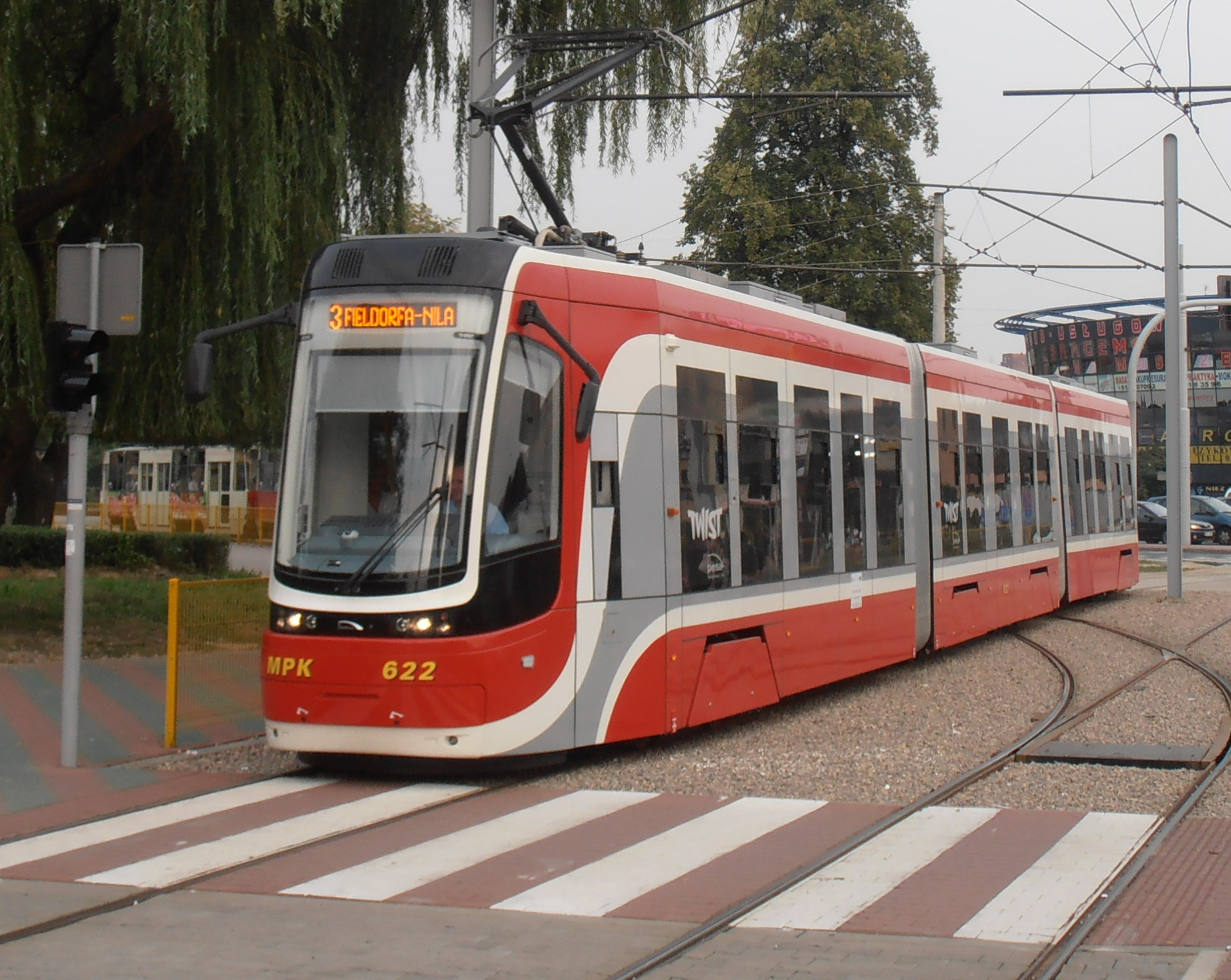
- PESA Twist tram in Częstochowa

Operation
- Locale: Częstochowa, Poland
- Open: 1959
- Lines: 3
- Operator: MPK Częstochowa

Infrastructure
- Track gauge: 1,435 mm (4 ft 8 1/2 in)
- Stock: 52 (as of March 2020)

Statistics
- Track length (total): 14.5 km (9.0 mi)
- Stops: 32
Overview
- Website: Official website

Częstochowa tram network

The Częstochowa tram system is a tram system in Częstochowa, Poland. The system began operation in 1959 and has a total length of 14.5 kilometres (9.0 mi). It is operated by Miejskie Przedsiębiorstwo Komunikacyjne w Częstochowie.

== History ==
=== Unrealised 1897-1913 plans ===
The first conception of a tram system in Częstochowa appeared in 1897. In 1901 a precise plan for the construction of the following four lines was published:

- Line 1, Jasna Góra - Daszyński Square
- Line 2, Najświętszej Maryji Panny Avenue - 1 Maja street
- Line 3, Daszyński Square - Factory near Mała street
- Line 4, Jasna Góra - Św. Barbary and Św. Augustyna streets intersection

The public tender for the construction began in 1903, the original plans underwent multiple changes and were ultimately rejected by the Governorate-General in Warsaw or the Ministry of Internal Affairs of the Russian Empire.

In 1905, a Belgian entrepreneur presented a new plan for a tram system, which was similar to the first. He intended to use wide gauge rails and to eventually extend the system from the planned 3 lines to 7. His plans were ultimately rejected.

In 1908, multiple plans were proposed, one of them was also quickly rejected due to using outdated horse-drawn trams. One of them has made it far into the planning stage but was also rejected by the government.

In 1913, A company from Saint Petersburg, Ssudowagon, presented a plan for a tram network, operating on broad gauge rails with a similar network map to all previous proposals. The tram network would've been connected to the main railway network and support cargo as well as moving passengers. As a part of the plan, Ssudowagon wanted to receive land in the city necessary for the construction for 40 years. The project was approved, however never came into realisation due to the start of World War 1 and was ultimately abandoned.

=== Creation of current network ===
Intensive growth of the city, extension of the steelworks and sharp increase in its workforce, and construction of new residential suburbs meant that bus-based public communication was overloaded. In 1952 a decision was made to build a tram line. Works started in 1955. The network was designed to run along separate right of way but with level crossings.

First line, double-tracked, 7.5 km (4.7 mi) long, between Worcella and Kucelin (steelworks site), was opened on 8 March 1959.

On 21 July 1959 a second line was opened. It was single-tracked and ran along Łukasińskiego, terminating past the intersection with Okrzei. It was the only single-track section of the network and the only one to be street running.

At the beginning of 1971 the line was extended north to Kiedrzyńska. On 31 August of the same year the trams stopped running along Łukasińskiego.

On 16 January 1984, a further extension of the line was opened. The new section connected Kiedrzyńska with Fieldorfa-Nila.

In 2012 a 4.5 km (2.8 mi) extension to Raków was opened.

On 20 March 2019 a network renewal programme started. On 1 September 2021 trams resumed running between Fieldorfa-Nila and Stadion Raków. Work on the section to Kucelin has not started yet. Trams to Raków Dworzec PKP started running again on 1 October 2021.

On 2 November 2022 trams resumed operation on the section to Kucelin on line 1 despite the renovations not having started yet.

== Rolling stock ==
Type	Photo	Year of manufacture	Number
Pesa 129Nb		2012	7
Pesa 129Nb		2020	10
Konstal 105Na		1979–1990	14
Konstal 102Na		1971	1 (historical)
Konstal 4N_{1} + ND_{3}		1958, 1955	1 + 1 (historical)

== Lines ==
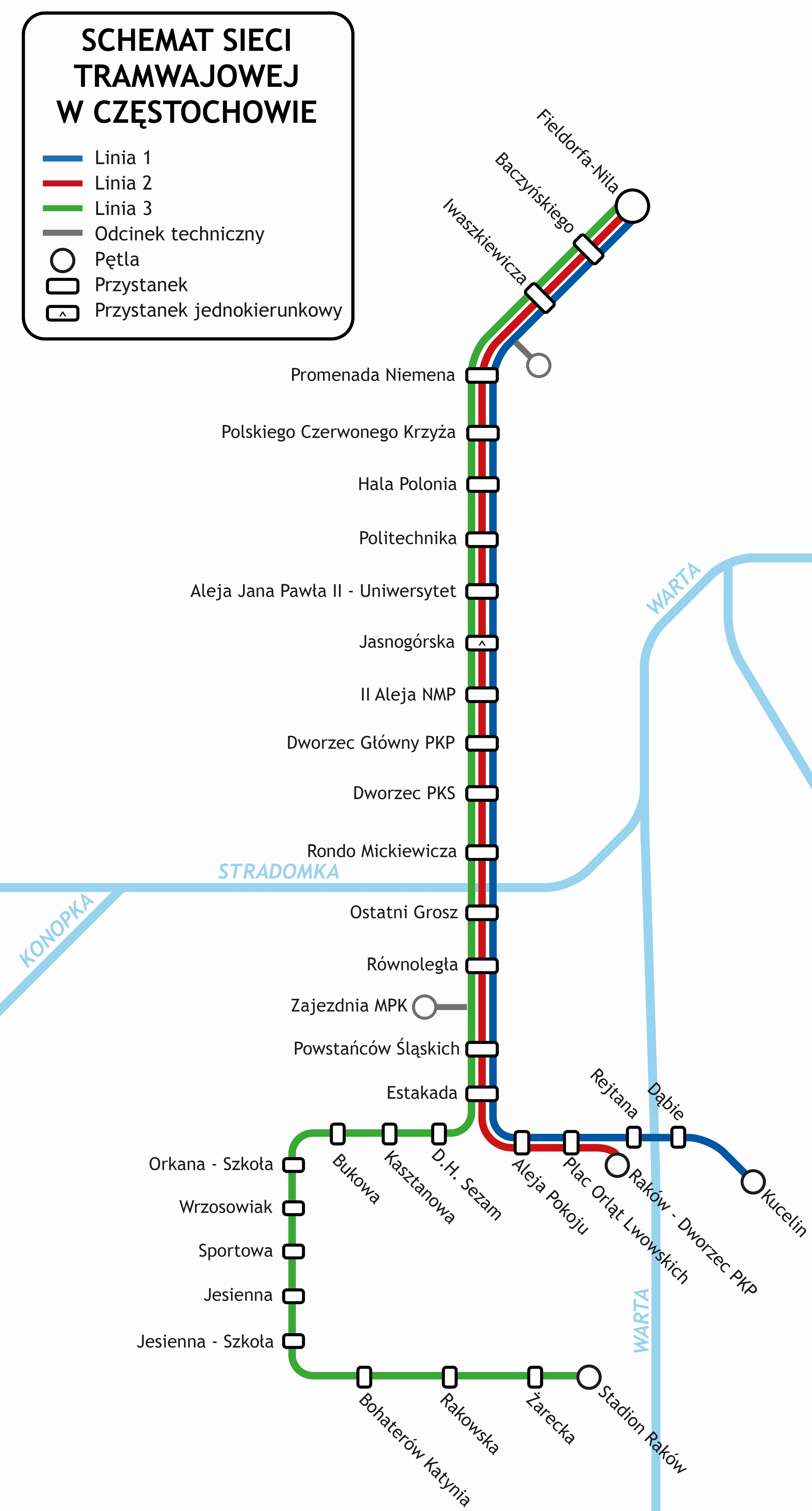
Diagram of the tram lines in Częstochowa

The Częstochowa tram system consists of three lines, running on the city's central north to south axis mostly along the same tramway, only splitting into three in the southern part of the city.

1 Fieldorfa-Nila – al. Wyzwolenia – al. Armii Krajowej – al. Kościuszki – al. Wolności – al. Niepodległości – al. Pokoju – Kucelin
- 2 Fieldorfa-Nila – al. Wyzwolenia – al. Armii Krajowej – al. Kościuszki – al. Wolności – al. Niepodległości – al. Pokoju – Raków Dworzec PKP
- 3 Fieldorfa-Nila – al. Wyzwolenia – al. Armii Krajowej – al. Kościuszki – al. Wolności – al. Niepodległości – Jagiellońska – Orkana – al. 11 Listopada – Jesienna – Rakowska – Limanowskiego – Stadion Raków
