= Trams in Gorzów Wielkopolski =

Tram system in Gorzów Wielkopolski, Poland

- Tramwaje w Gorzowie Wielkopolskim
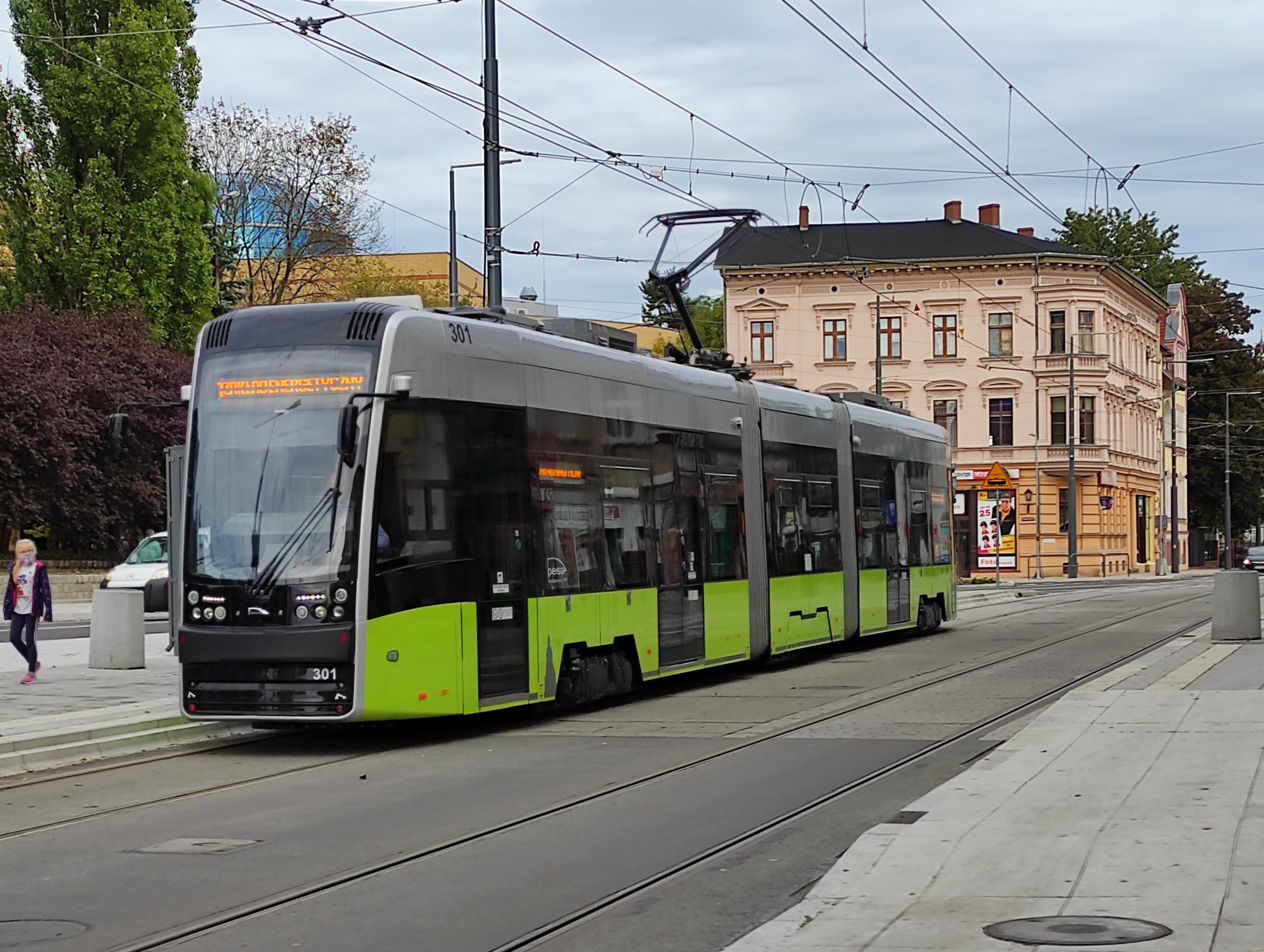
- Pesa Twist tram in 2020

Operation
- Locale: Gorzów Wielkopolski, Poland
- Open: 1899; July 2, 2020 (First section of the tramway reopened); July 24, 2023 (Second section of the tramway reopened); 2 January 2024 (Refurbishment project completed)
- Close: October 1, 2017 (Refurbishment project)
- Lines: 4
- Operator: MZK Gorzów Wielkopolski

Infrastructure
- Track gauge: 1,435 mm (4 ft 8 1/2 in)

Statistics
- Track length (total): 25 km (16 mi)
- Route length: 11.8 km (7.3 mi)
Overview
- single-track sections are marked with thin line
- Website: Official website

The Gorzów Wielkopolski tram system is a tram system in Gorzów Wielkopolski, Poland, that has been in operation since 1899. The system is operated by Miejski Zakład Komunikacji w Gorzowie Wielkopolskim (MZK Gorzów Wielkopolski). Currently, Gorzów Wielkopolski has four tram lines.

== Lines ==
- 1 Wieprzyce – Kostrzyńska – al. 11 listopada – Sikorskiego – Warszawska – Podmiejska – Pomorska – Walczaka – Dowgielewiczowej – Silwana – Gen. Fieldorfa-Nila
- 2 Wieprzyce – Kostrzyńska – al. 11 listopada – Sikorskiego – B. Chrobrego – Mieszka I – Kazimierza Wielkiego – Piaski
- 3 Piaski – Kazimierza Wielkiego – Mieszka I – B. Chrobrego – Warszawska – Podmiejska – Pomorska – Walczaka – Dowgielewiczowej – Silwana - Gen. Fieldorfa-Nila
- 4 Dworzec Główny - Dworcowa - Sikorskiego - Warszawska – Podmiejska – Pomorska – Walczaka – Dowgielewiczowej – Silwana - Gen. Fieldorfa-Nila

== History ==
The network opened in 1899 in the city then known as Landsberg an der Warthe. Damages in World War II resulted in the replacement of trams with trolleybuses from 1941 until 1947, with tram services being reinstated afterwards.

From October 1, 2017, all services were suspended in order to modernize the network. Trial runs began on April 16, 2020. Regular services on line 1 resumed from July 2, 2020. Since October 26, 2020, the trams terminate at the Dowgielewiczowej stop to allow the extension of the line to Gen. Emila Fieldorfa-Nila to be built.

The branch to the railway station, unused since 2012, is going to be refurbished as well.

As of July 24, 2023, the extension to Gen. Fieldorfia-Nila has been completed.

The branch to the railway station was refurbished in 2024.

== Future plans ==
A new line, from Rondo Ofiar Katynia (near the Park Kopernika stop), through al. Ruchu Młodzieży Niezależnej, Piłsudskiego, Górczyńska, Okulickiego, Szarych Szeregów to Walczaka (near the Silwana stop) is planned.

== Rolling stock ==
The fleet consists of 14 Pesa Twist low-floor trams, 8 ex-Kassel 6ZGTW/6EGTW trams, built by Duewag and Wegmann, and four Konstal 105Na, though they were retired from regular service in 2014.

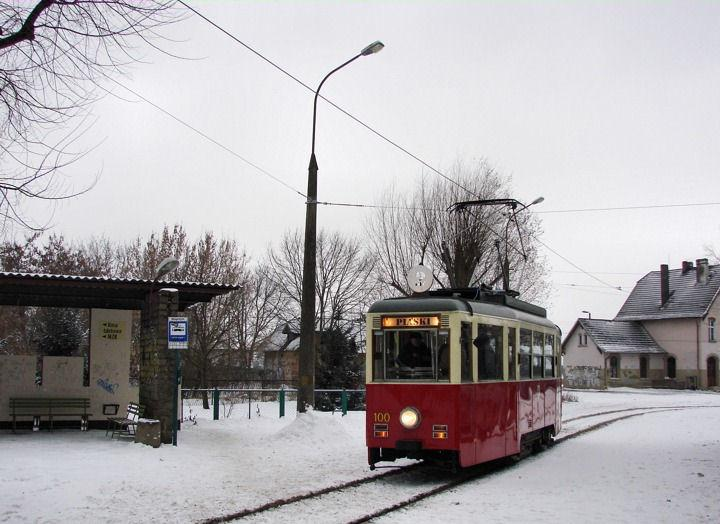
Konstal N in December 2010

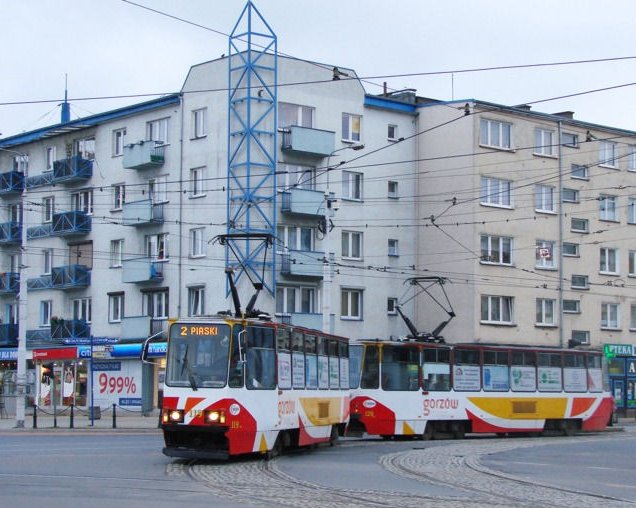
Konstal 105Na in November 2011

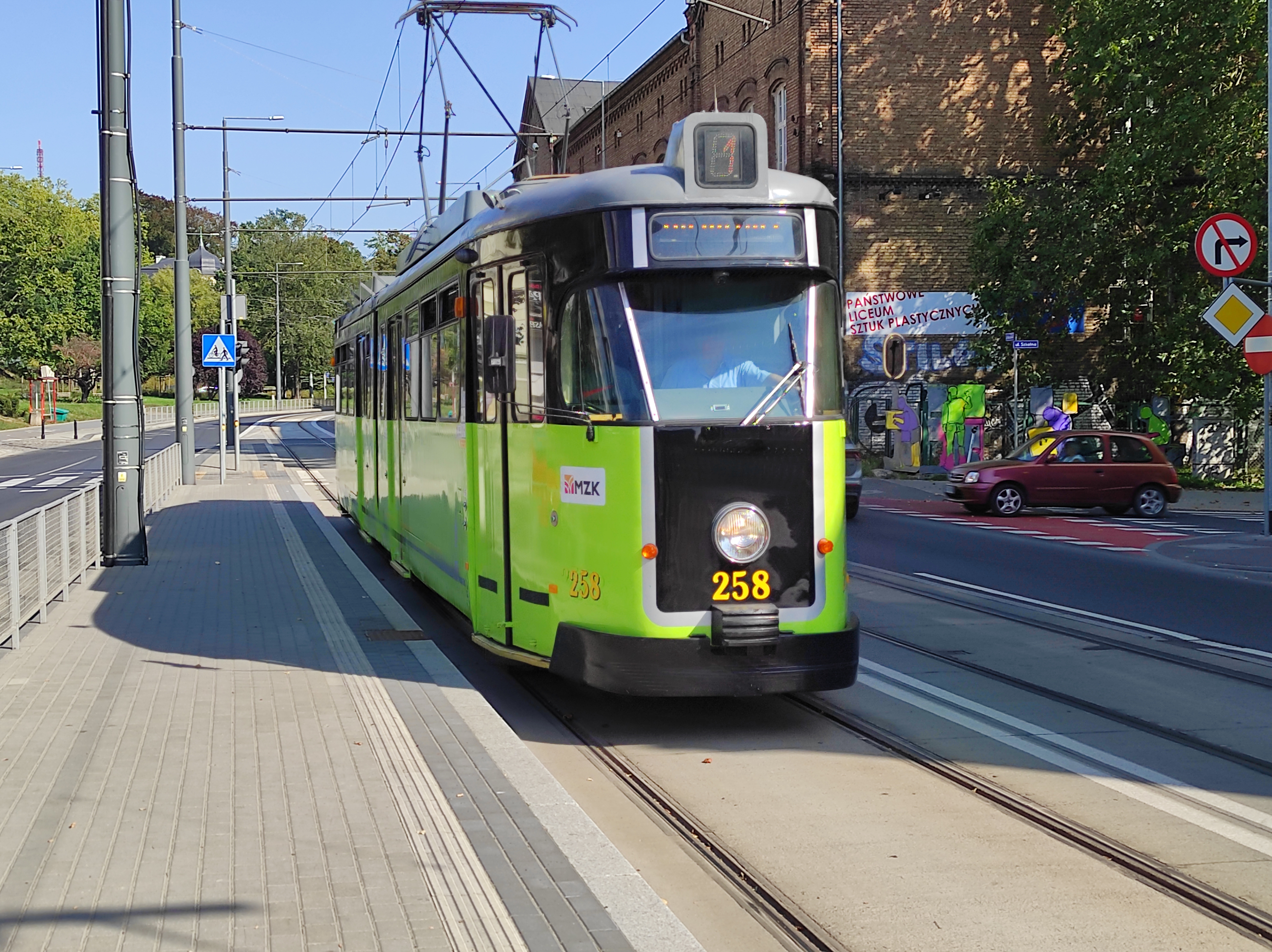
6ZGTW in September 2020

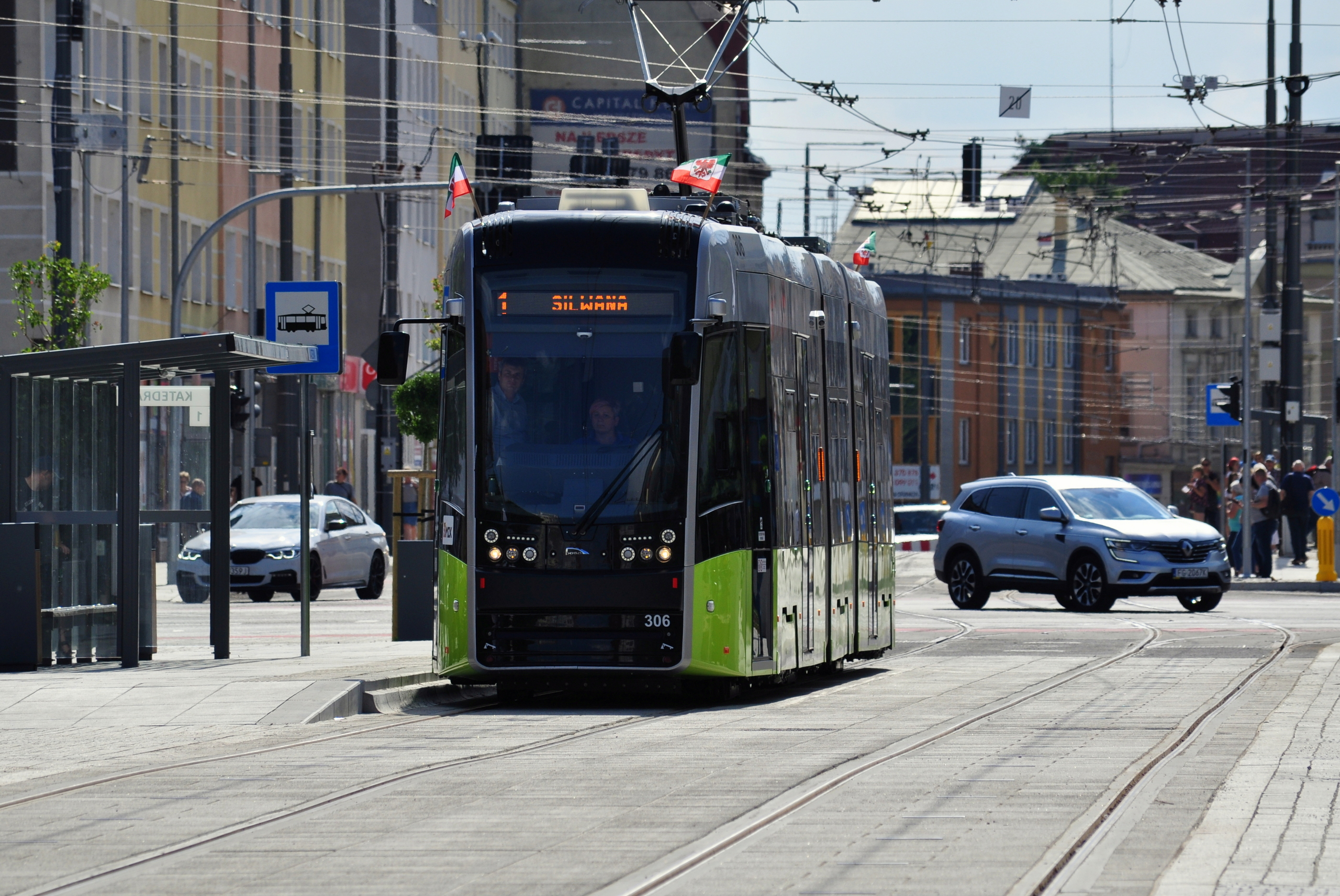
Pesa Twist in July 2020

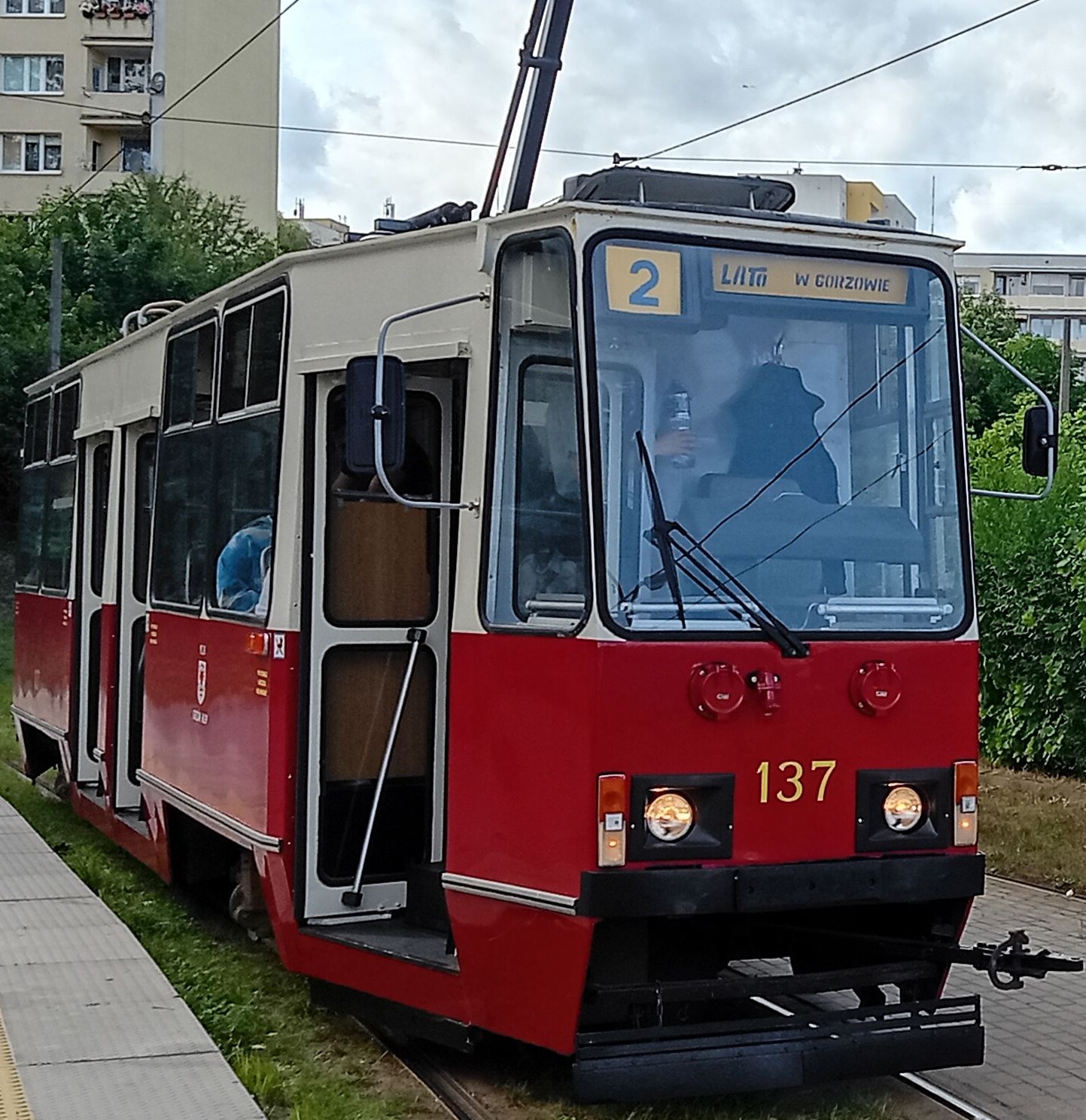
105Na in a heritage livery on a heritage run in Gorzów Wielkopolski, 2026
