= Konstal 105N =

Tram model

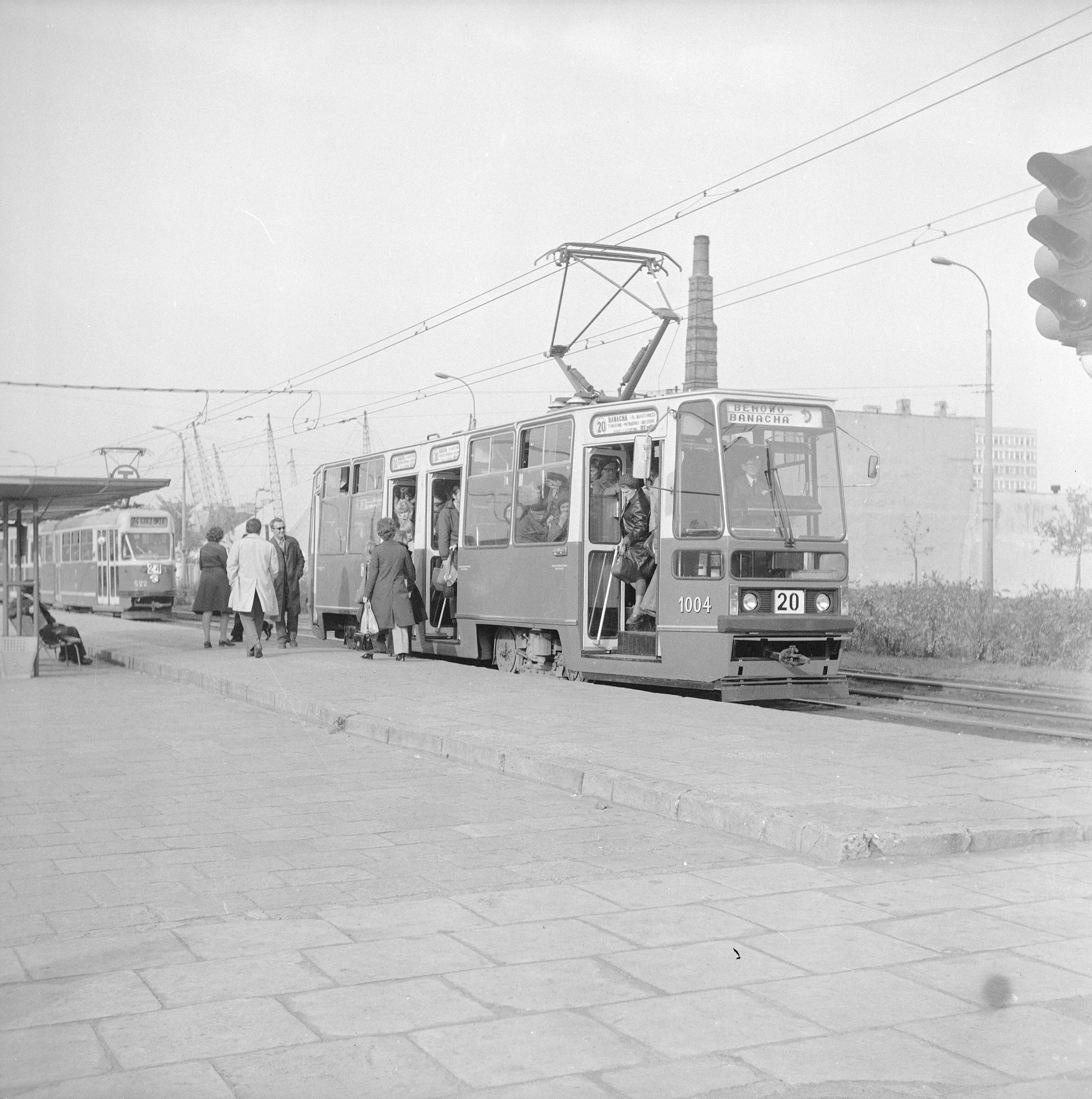
- Photograph of Konstal 105N number 1004 in Warsaw by Grażyna Rutowska, October 1975. From the collections of the NAC
- Manufacturer: (Poland) Konstal
- Constructed: 1973–1979
- Refurbished: 1982–2001 (105N -> 105Na Modification)
- Number built: 980
- Number in service: 8 vehicles (of which 7 of them are historic)
- Number preserved: 8 vehicles
- Capacity: 21 seats 112 standing
- Operator: various
- Depot: various
- Line served: various

Specifications
- Car body construction: steel
- Train length: 13,390 mm (43 ft 11 in)
- Width: 2,400 mm (7 ft 10 in)
- Height: 3,060 mm (10 ft 0 in)
- Floor height: 850 mm (2 ft 9 in)
- Doors: 4
- Maximum speed: 68.5 km/h
- Weight: 16800 kg
- Traction system: Resistor control
- Traction motors: Dolmel LTa-220
- Power output: 4 x 41.5 kW
- Bogies: 2 (Bo'Bo)
- Track gauge: 1,435 mm (4 ft 8 1/2 in)

Konstal 105N is a family of electric trams designed by Konstal, a Polish company based in Chorzów, produced between 1973 and 1979.

== Konstal 105N ==
105N is a single module, unidirectional tramcar with four doors on the right side.

The design came about as a result of modernisation of Konstal's earlier 13N model. All the electrical systems from the 13N remained unchanged, but the 105N abandoned the streamlined appearance of its predecessor for a more angular look. The side windows were enlarged, and smaller windows were added on the front and sides, leading to its being nicknamed aquarium. These changes made the 105N significantly (approximately 1200 kg) lighter than the 13N and decreased the amount of raw materials used in production. The first models lacked the ability to be connected to one another, and the placement of the electrical system caused problems with humidity. The tram was equipped with electromagnetic, drum and rail brakes. Its chief engineers were Zygmunt Giziński and Wojciech Kozik.

The 105N trams were used in all Polish cities with tram systems. During their years of service, most of them were modernized and upgraded to the 105Na variant, so today there are only a few of them remaining. In Gdańsk, Poznań, Szczecin, and Warsaw there are cabs rebuilt to the earliest version. The narrow-gauge version, 105NW, was used in Bydgoszcz and Łódź, but the cabs were upgraded. The 805N cabs in Łódź were also upgraded to 805Na.

== Other variants ==
In 1977 4 105NW cabs for Bydgoszcz and Łódź, were made for metre-gauge tracks.

25 units of a new version for Łódź, the 805N were built in 1978. All of these were later upgraded to 805Na standard.

14 thyristor-based 105NT units were built in 1989, most got downgraded to the 105Na standard, with exception of #TT021 owned by MPK Kraków and #790 owned by Silesian Trams, which was upgraded between 2004 and 2006 to 105N-2K standard, and got rebuilt in 2016. the 105NT type was the developed version of the faulty 106N developed in back 1977

In 1995, on the basis of two 105N cabs, HCP in Poznań built a prototype of a three-module, partially low-floor tram, the Konstal/HCP 105N/2 but issues with reliability, coupled with availability of cheap second-hand rolling stock, caused the project to be abandoned.

== Gallery ==
Gallery

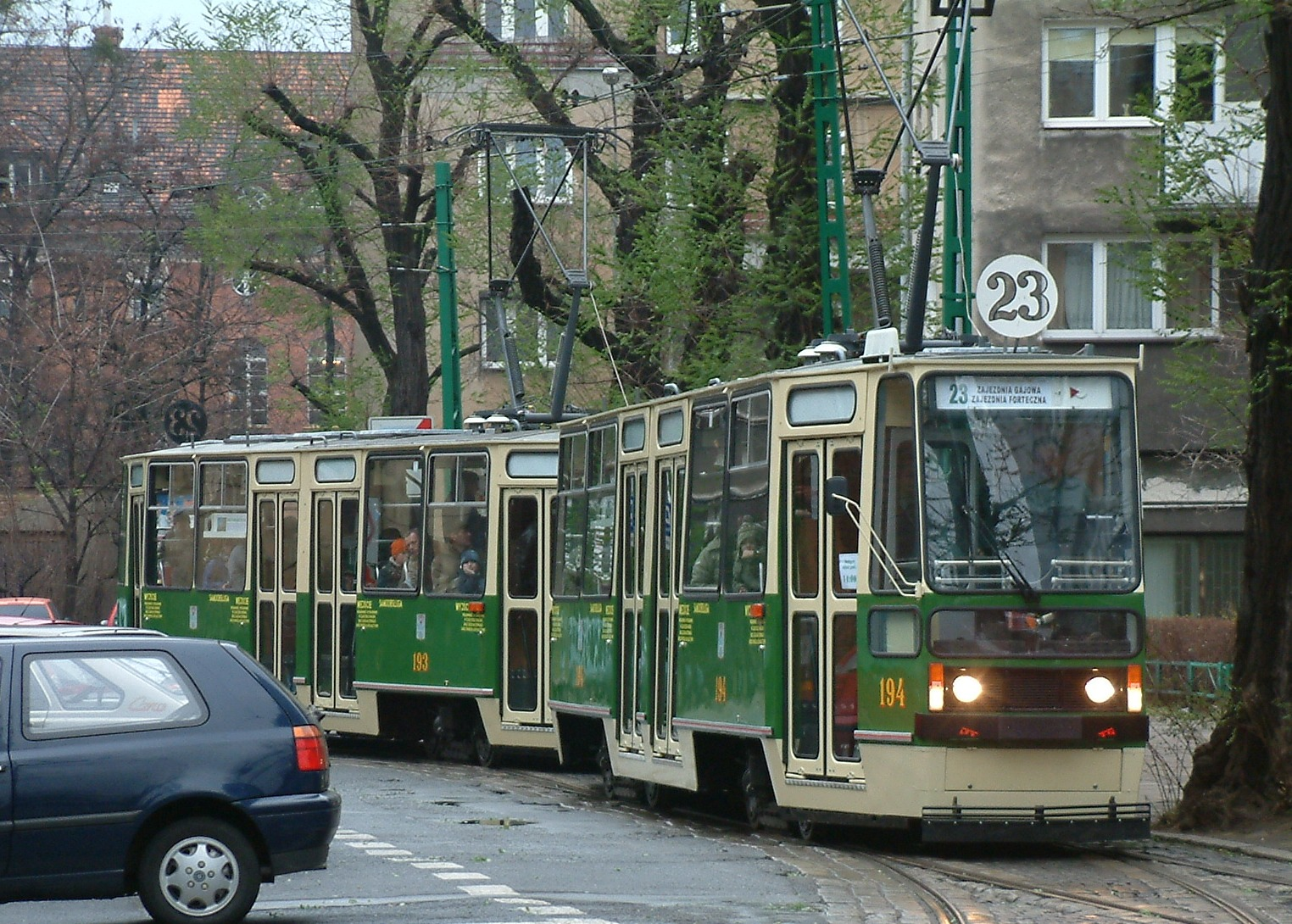
Konstal 105N in Poznań

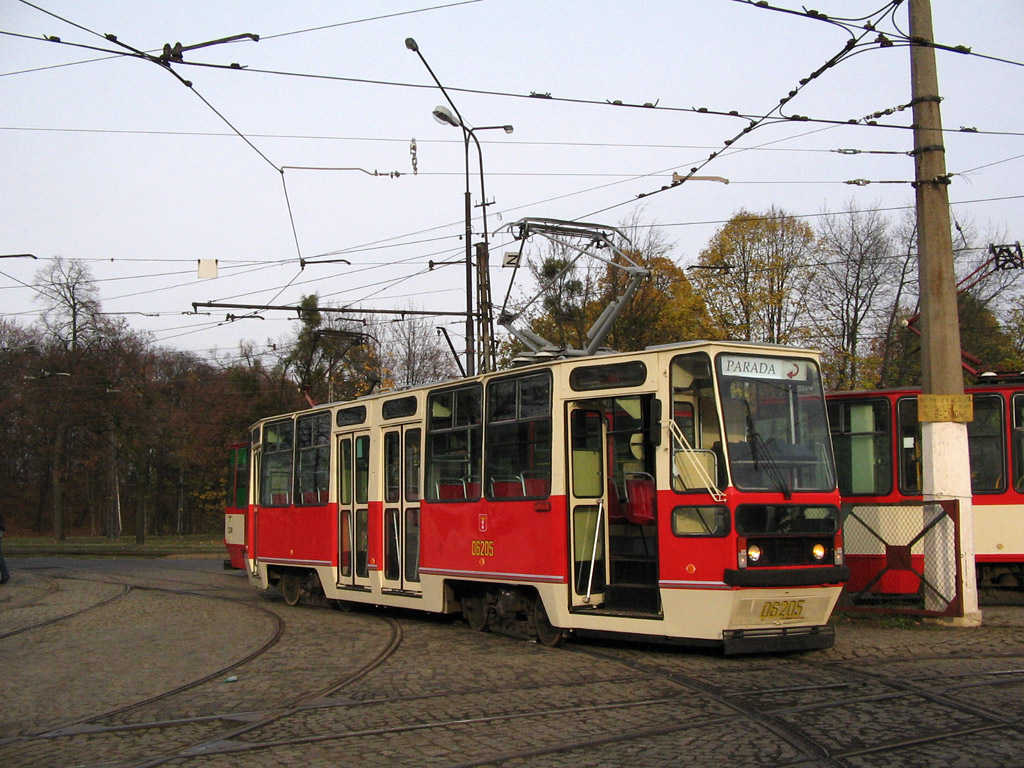
Konstal 105N in Gdańsk

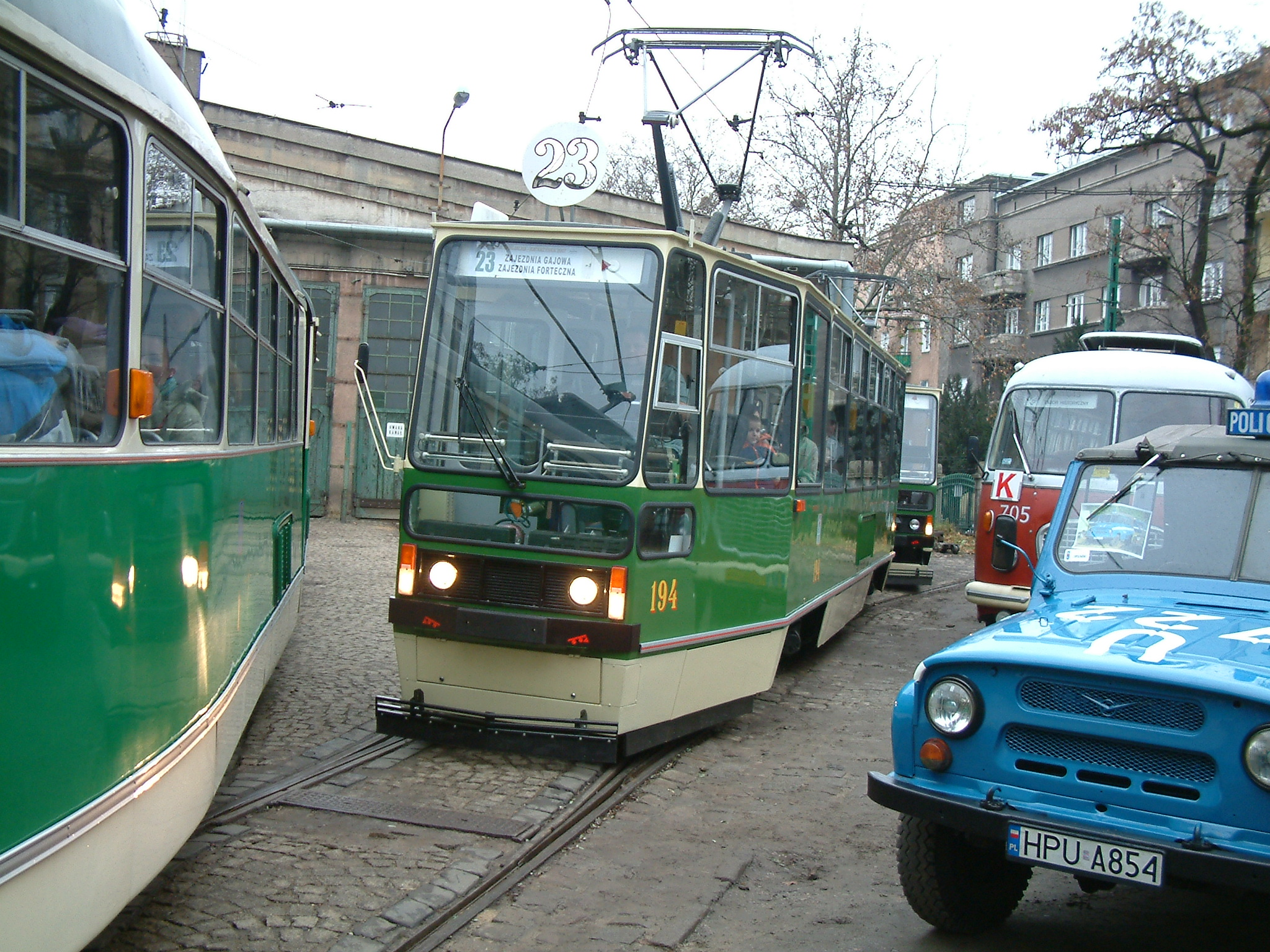
A restored Konstal 105N in Poznań
