= Trams in Wrocław =

Tram system in the city of Wrocław, Poland

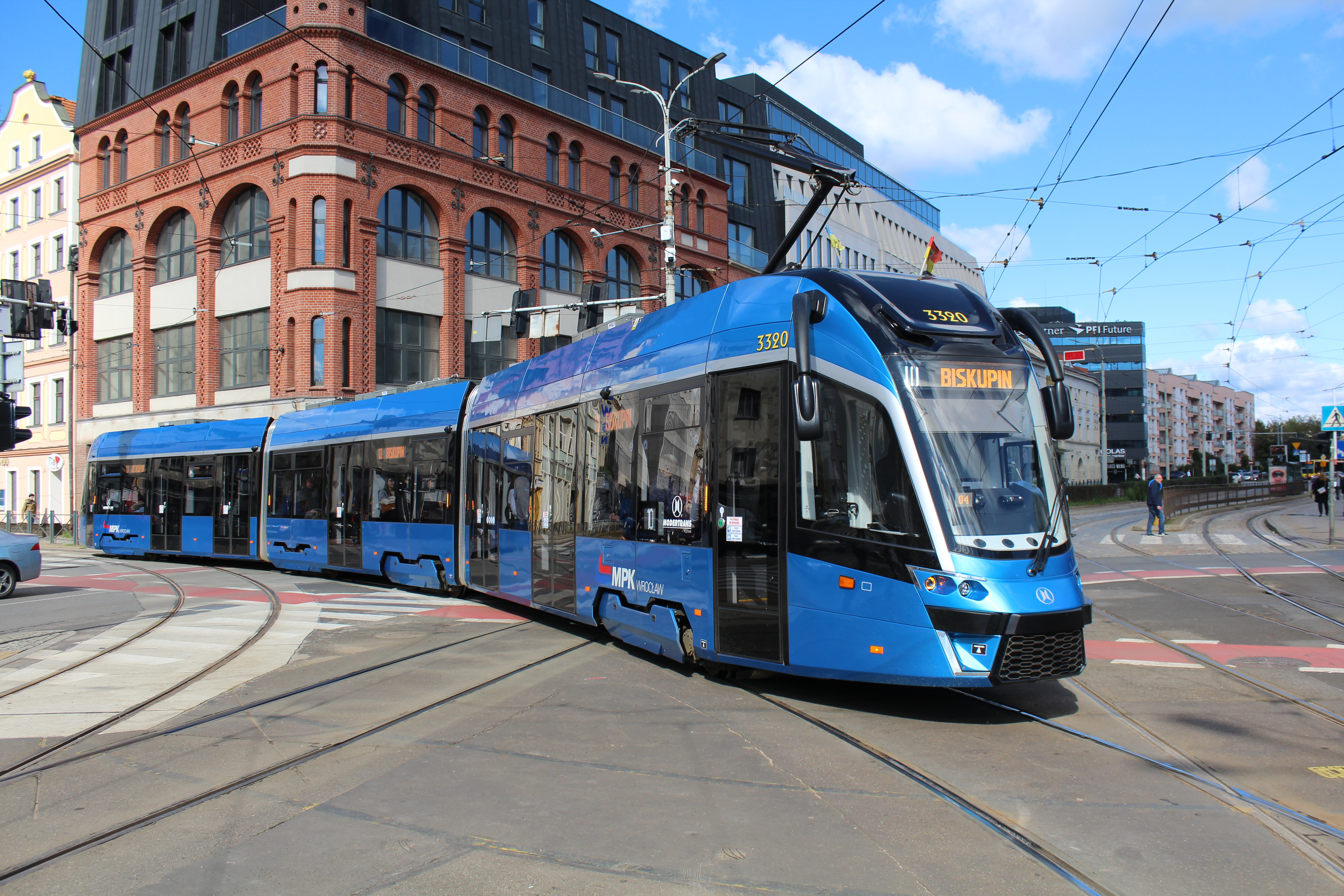
- Moderus Gamma tram

Overview
- Native name: Tramwaje we Wrocławiu
- Owner: City of Wrocław
- Locale: Wrocław, Poland
- Transit type: Tram
- Number of lines: 24
- Website: http://mpk.wroc.pl/

Operation
- Began operation: July 10, 1877; 149 years ago
- Operator: MPK Wrocław
- Number of vehicles: Pesa, Modertrans, Škoda, Protram, Konstal

Technical
- System length: 84 km (52 mi)
- Track gauge: 1,435 mm (4 ft 8 1/2 in) standard gauge
System map
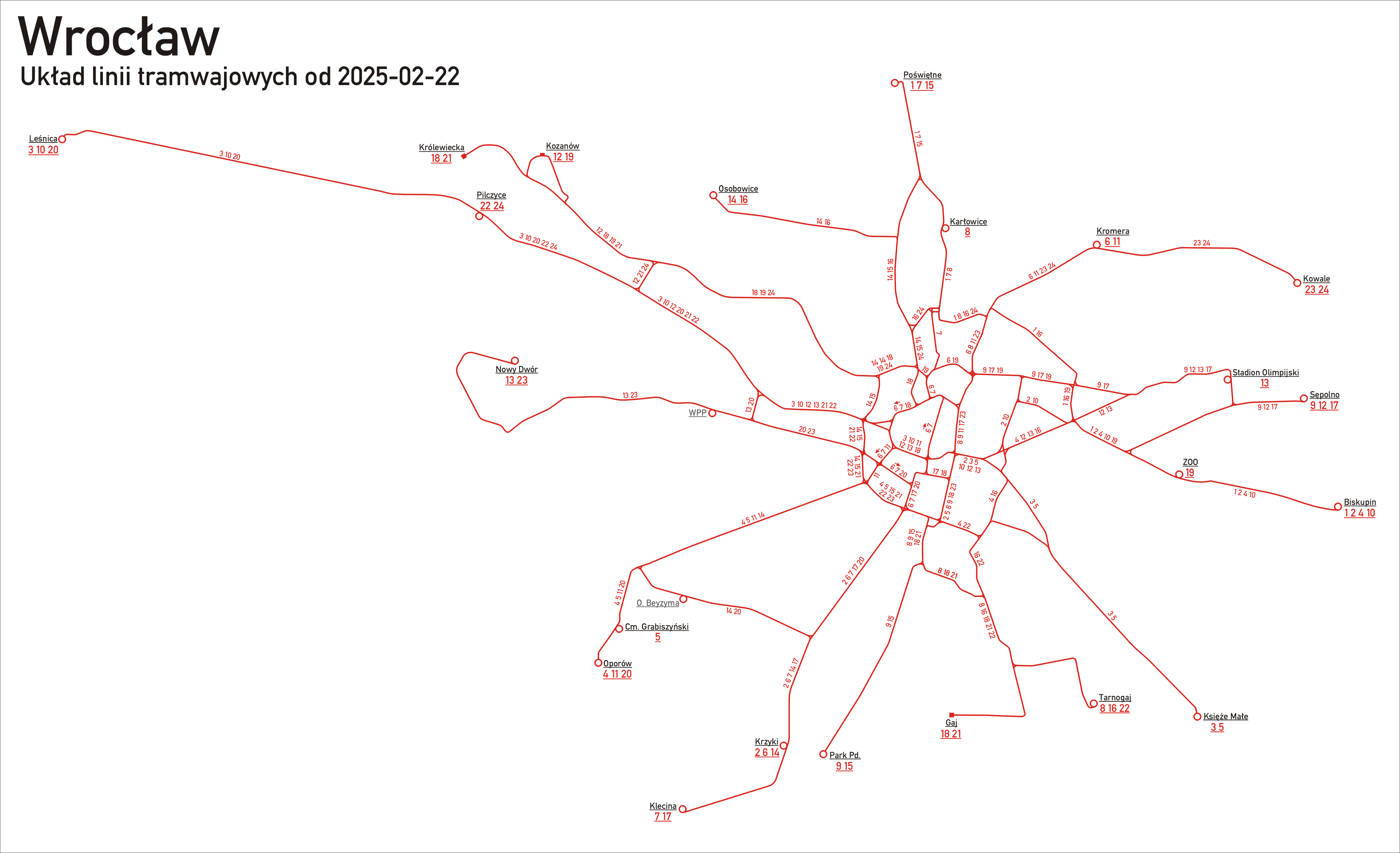

The Wrocław tram system (Polish: Tramwaje we Wrocławiu) is the tram system in Wrocław, Poland.

Having first opened for service on 10 July 1877 with horsecars, it is the third oldest tramway in Poland (after Warsaw and Szczecin); it is the oldest electrified tramway in Poland. The system uses 1,435 mm (4 ft 8 1/2 in) standard gauge and is operated by Miejskie Przedsiębiorstwo Komunikacyjne we Wrocławiu (MPK Wrocław). The network consists of 25 lines with a total track length of 84 kilometres (52 mi) and line length of 258.2 kilometres (160.4 mi), six depots and 20 loops.

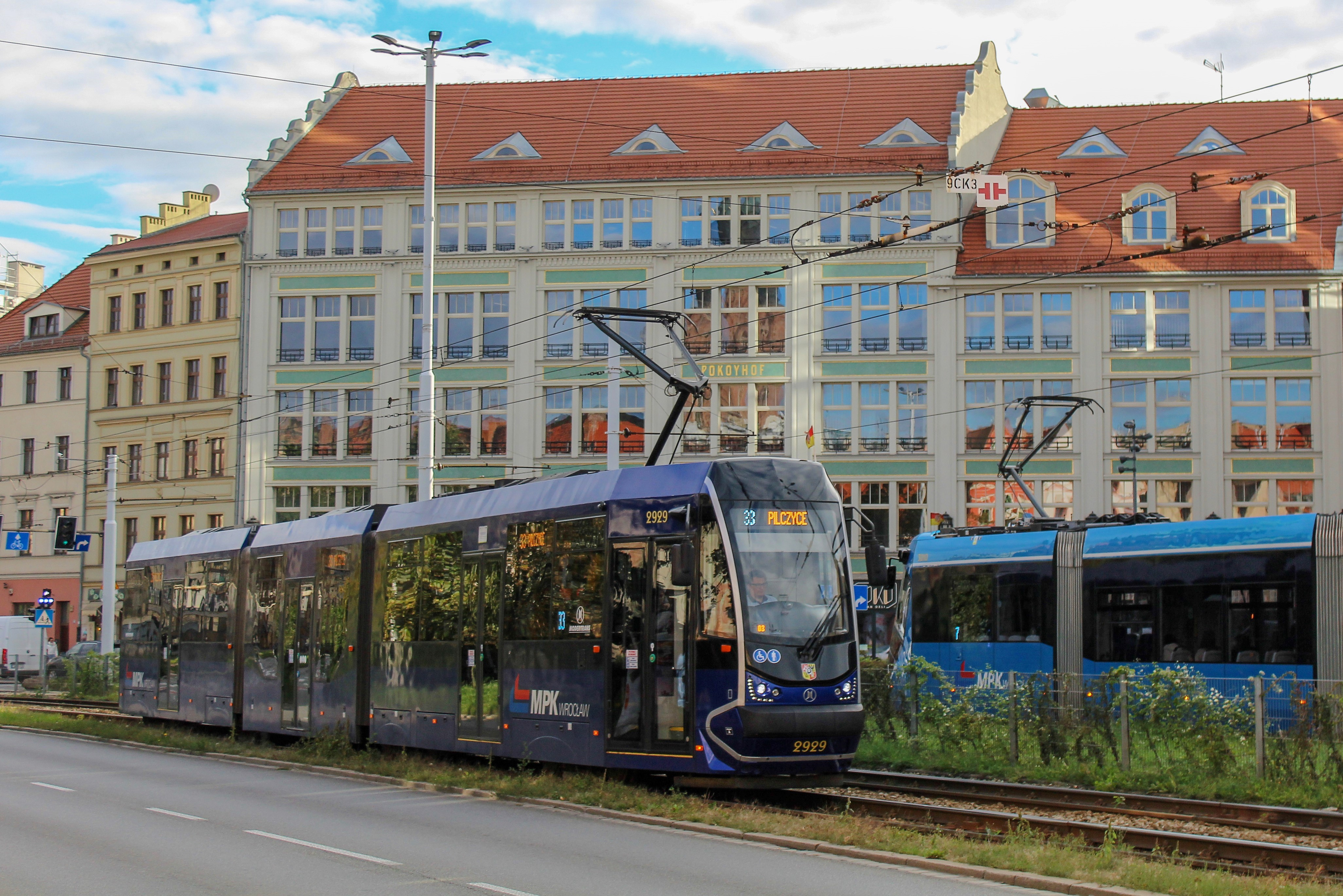
Moderus Beta MF 19 AC 2929

== Network ==
Below is a table of permanent routes as of the October 6 2025 schedule:

| Line | Route |
|---|---|
| 0 | Dworzec Główny ↔ Zoo (weekend line) |
| 1 | Biskupin ↔ Poświętne |
| 2 | Krzyki ↔ Biskupin |
| 3 | Leśnica ↔ Księże Małe |
| 4 | Oporów ↔ Biskupin |
| 5 | Grabiszyńska - Cmentarz ↔ Księże Małe |
| 6 | Kromera ↔ Krzyki |
| 7 | Poświętne ↔ Klecina |
| 8 | Tarnogaj ↔ Karłowice |
| 9 | 8 Maja↔ Park Południowy |
| 10 | Leśnica ↔ Biskupin |
| 11 | Oporów ↔ Kromera |
| 12 | Kozanów (Dokerska) ↔ Stadion Olimpijski |
| 13 | Wrocław Nowy Dwór (P+R) ↔ Stadion Olimpijski |
| 14 | Krzyki ↔ Osobowice |
| 15 | Poświętne ↔ Park Południowy |
| 16 | Tarnogaj ↔ Osobowice |
| 17 | Klecina ↔ 8 Maja |
| 18 | Tarczyński Arena (Królewiecka) ↔ Gaj |
| 19 | Kozanów (Dokerska) ↔ Zoo |
| 20 | Oporów ↔ Leśnica |
| 21 | Tarczyński Arena (Królewiecka) ↔ Gaj |
| 22 | Pilczyce ↔ Tarnogaj |
| 23 | Wrocław Nowy Dwór (P+R) ↔ Kowale |
| 24 | Pilczyce ↔ Kowale |

lines on diversion

== Rolling stock ==
Currently eight types of trams are operating in Wrocław: Konstal 105Na, Protram 204 WrAs, Protram 205 WrAs, Škoda 16 T, Škoda 19 T, Pesa Twist, Moderus Beta and Moderus Gamma. The 105N type wagons are subjected to various upgrades (and after the upgrade they are marked 105NWr).

In the period from 1991 to 2004, no new trams were bought; only repairs and upgrades of models Konstal 105N and Konstal 105Na were performed. During 1978–1993, six two-wagon Protram 204 WrAs and ten low-floor Protram 205 WrAs vehicles were bought, all produced by RMT Protram Wrocław. In March 2005, Wrocław decided to purchase eight Skoda 16T vehicles. This was later expanded to 17 vehicles, all of which were delivered between December 2006 and November 2007.

In 2009 Wrocław bought 31 Skoda 19T trams to operate on new PLUS lines connecting Gaj and Sępolno to the stadium, which was built to host the Euro 2012 games. In 2014 the concept of PLUS lines was scrapped. As of 2024 these are the only bidirectional trams operated by MPK Wrocław, and as such they are the only trams that can operate on lines 18 and 21.

In recent years, purchases and modernisation of rolling stock have been used to withdraw and scrap older trams like Protram 105NWr or Protram 204WrAs.

| Photo | Type | Production | Number | Note |
|---|---|---|---|---|
| | Protram 105NWr | 1978-1993 | 77 | Constructed as Konstal 105Na. |
| | Protram 204 WrAs | 1978–1993 | 6 | |
| | Moderus Beta MF 17 AC | 2020–2021 | 26 | Constructed as Protram 205 WrAs in the years 2006-2011. |
| | Škoda 16 T | 2006-2008 | 17 | Renovated in the years 2020-2022. |
| | Škoda 19 T | 2010–2011 | 31 | Currently under renovation |
| Pesa Twist on Świdnicka tram stop | Pesa Twist 2010N | 2015 | 8 | |
| Moderus Beta 19 AC on Powstańców Śląskich stop | Moderus Beta MF 19 AC | 2015 | 22 | |
| | Moderus Beta MF 24 AC | 2018-2019 | 40 | |
| | Moderus GammaLF 07 AC | 2021-2023 | 46 | |
| | Pesa Twist 146N | 2024- | 23 (40) | |

=== Historic vehicles ===
- "Berolina" tram set from 1902 - motor car No. 1 and trailer No. 2
- "Max Berg" four-axle motor car No. 325 (Falkenried 1901)
- several LH Standard motor cars (LHB 1925-1929), three of them - No. 1192, 1209 and 1217 - are operational
- several Konstal N, from which four motor cars - No. 1332, 1336, 1444 and G-091 - and one trailer (ND 3560) are operational
- Konstal 102N 6-axle articulated motor car No. 2109
- Konstal 102Na 6-axle articulated motor car No. 2069
- eleven Konstal 105Na 4-axle motor cars, No. 1227 (ex Warsaw), 2347, 2424, 2432, 2531, 2532, 2557, 2558, 2566, 2567 et 2568, all of them except 2432 are operational
- Tatra T3 motor car No. 999 (ex Ostrava)
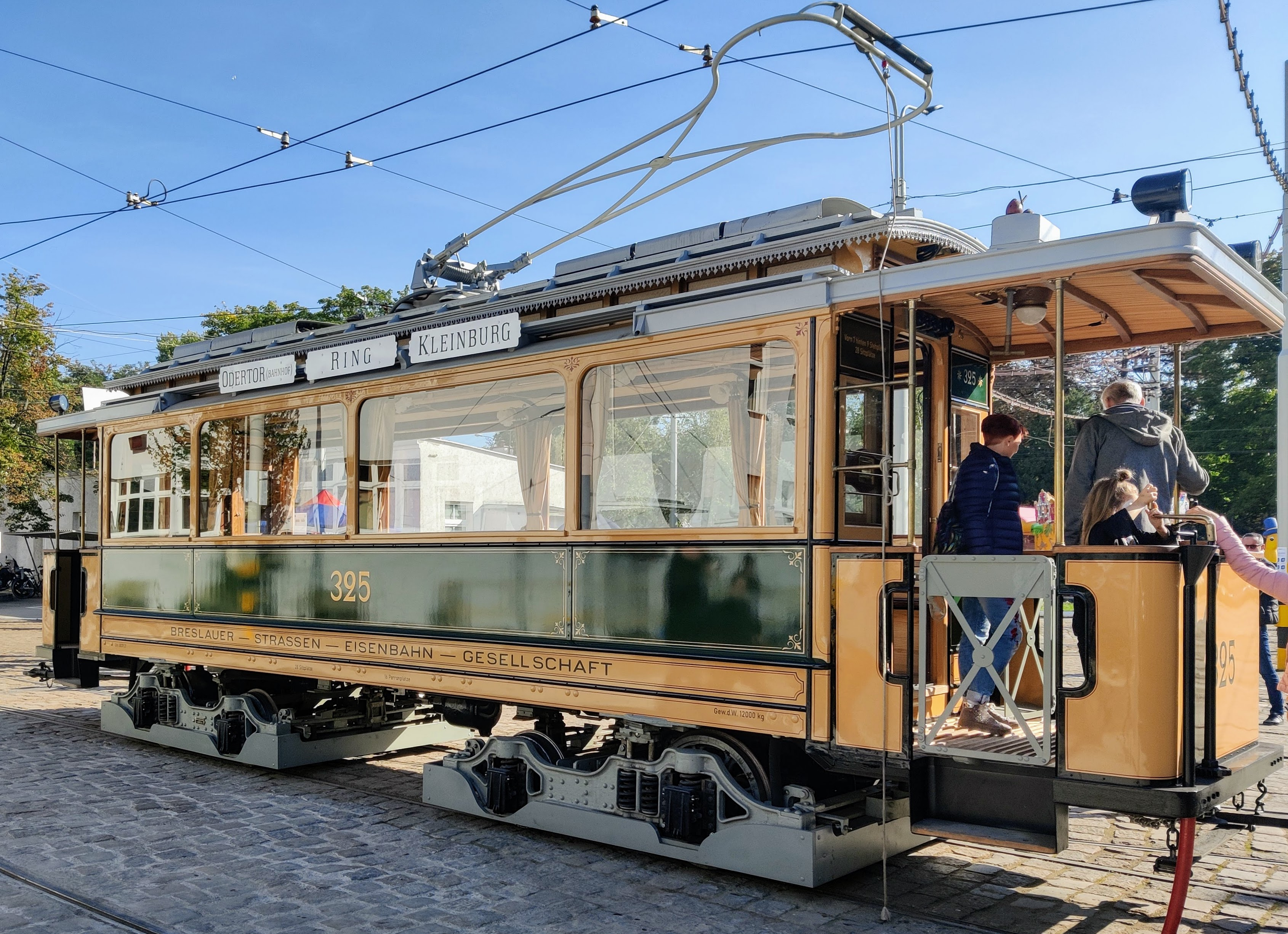
"Maximum" motor car No. 325

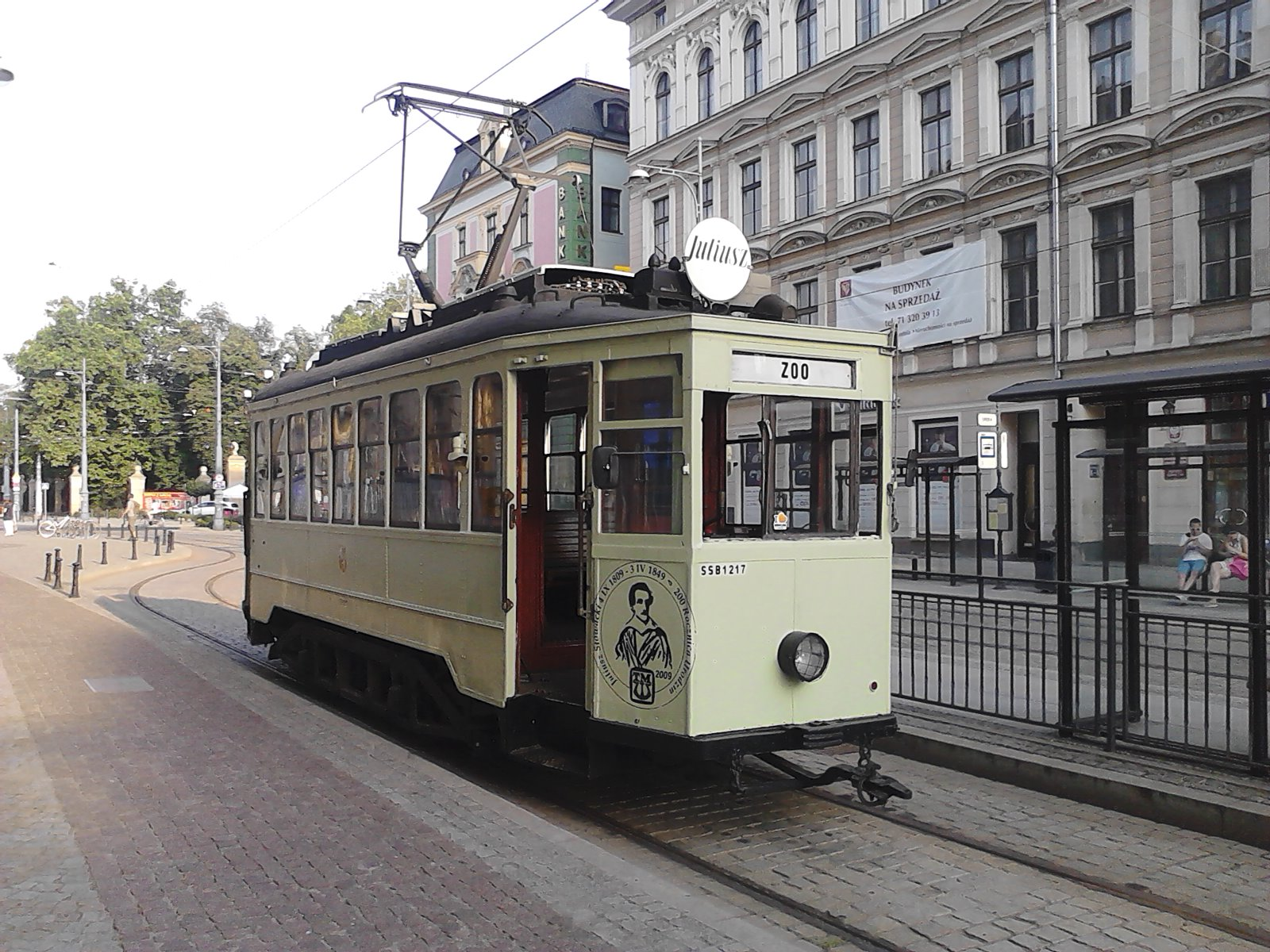
LH Standard motor car No. 1217

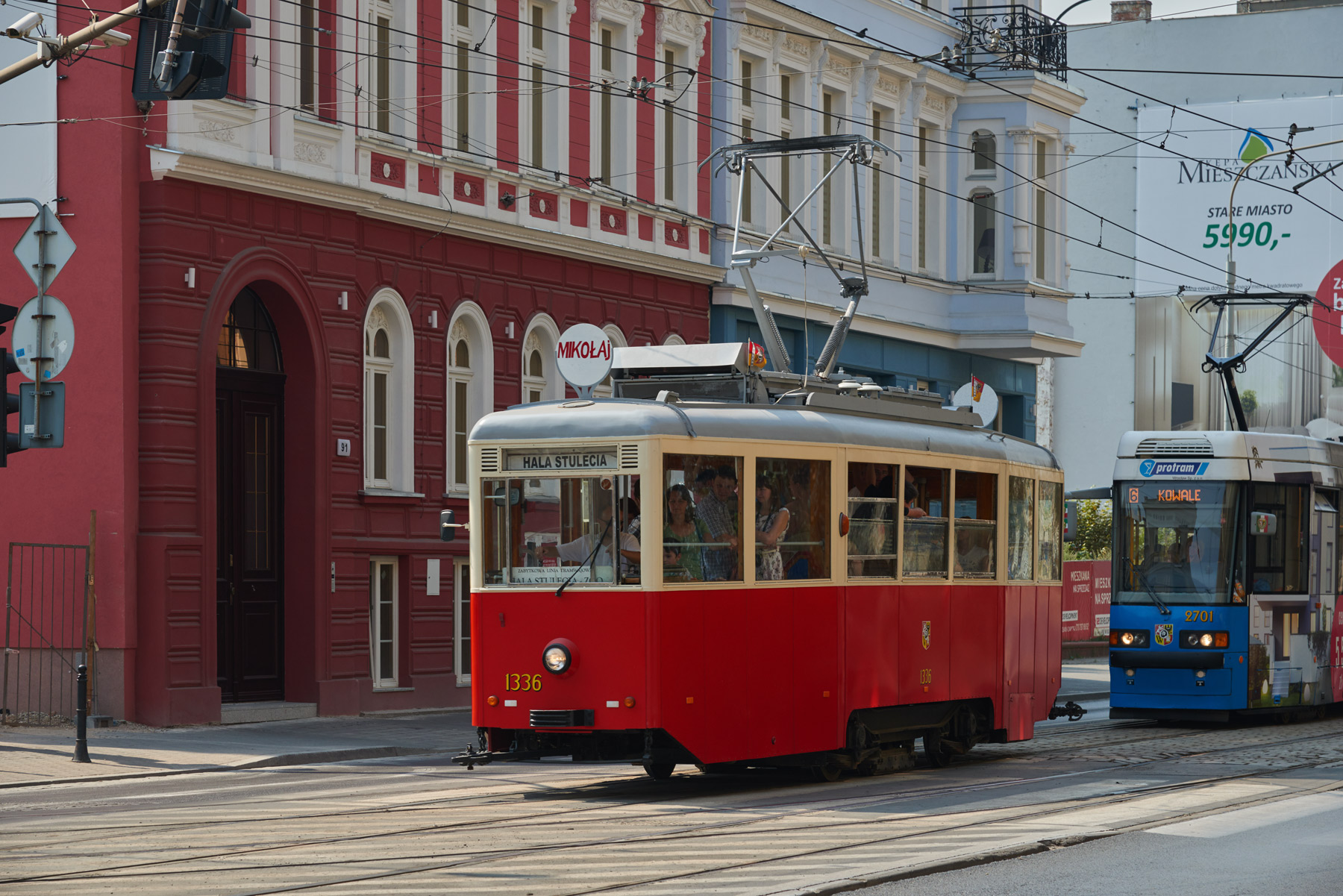
Konstal N No. 1336

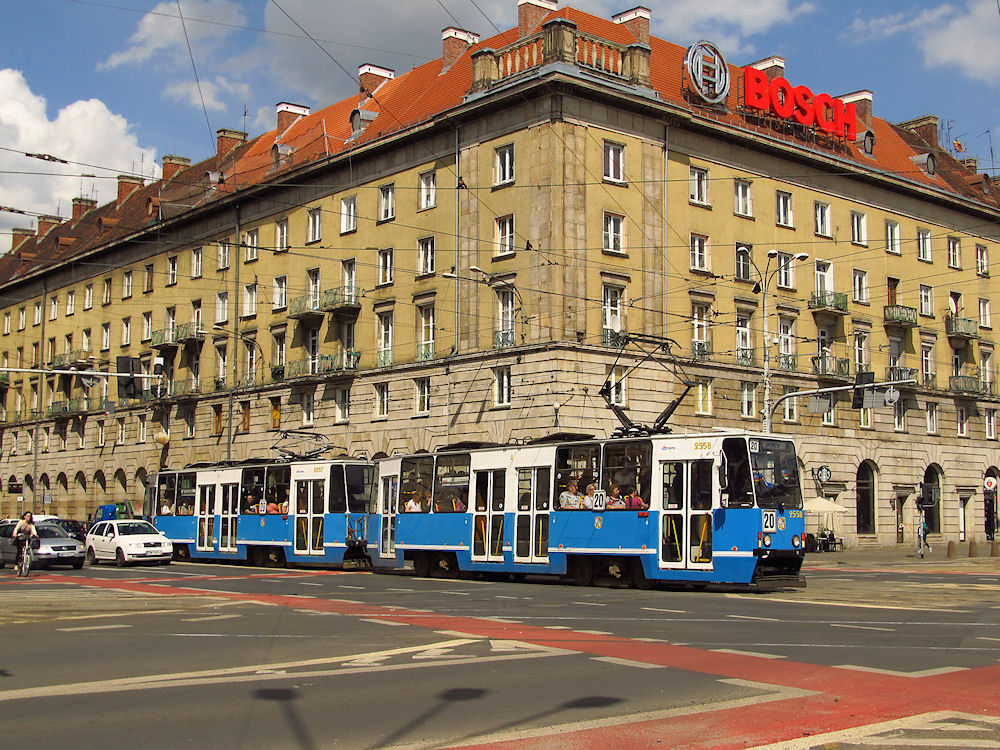
Konstal 105Na 2558+2557
