= Konstal 105NWr =

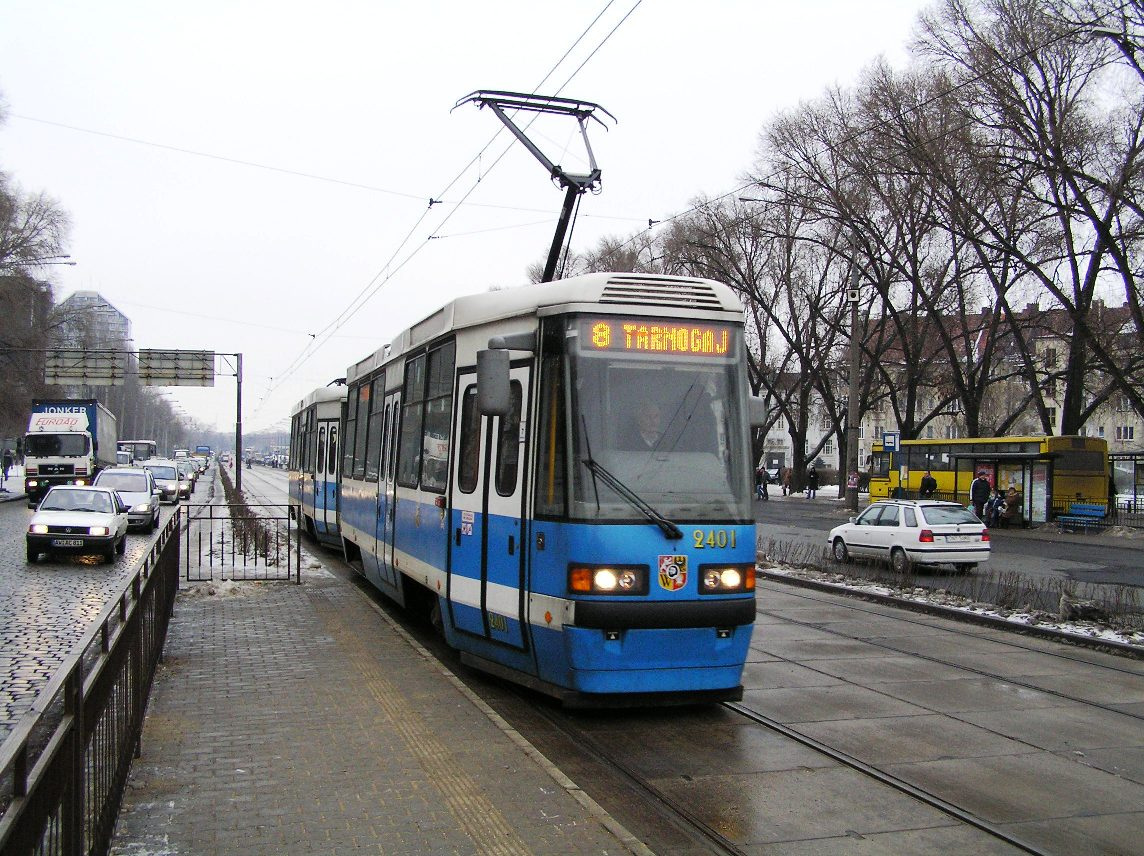
- Manufacturers: Konstal; Modernized by Protram
- Assembly: Wrocław Poland
- Constructed: 2005 - 2010
- Predecessor: Konstal 105Na
- Successor: Protram 204WrAs

Specifications
- Low-floor: 0%
- Doors: 6
- Articulated sections: 1
- Maximum speed: 70 km/h

Konstal 105NWr is a Polish tram resulting from the modernization of the tram Konstal 105Na by Protram plants.

== Building ==
In the process of modernization many things were upgraded for example the tram received new doors and new front and rear plastic walls with rectangular headlights. Currently, in Wrocław, there are 64 trams of this type.

== Design ==
The tram is not far different from its predecessor Konstal 105Na. The overall exterior design is changed, including the removal of one of the doors in each carriage. The interior differs from tram to tram because the seats were chosen by price and quantity available. The rear car has more seating than the front due to the lack of a driver's cabin. Today, the tram is often mistaken as the Protram 204WrAs, since it looks roughly the same. Another tram that is recognized by the people to be a modernized version of the Konstal 105Na is the Protram 205WrAs. By a fact the Protram models are completely different.

== Equipment ==
Some of the trams are equipped with Air-Conditioning for the driver. The standard are better, mainly plastic seats with textures on them.
