= Konstal 13N =

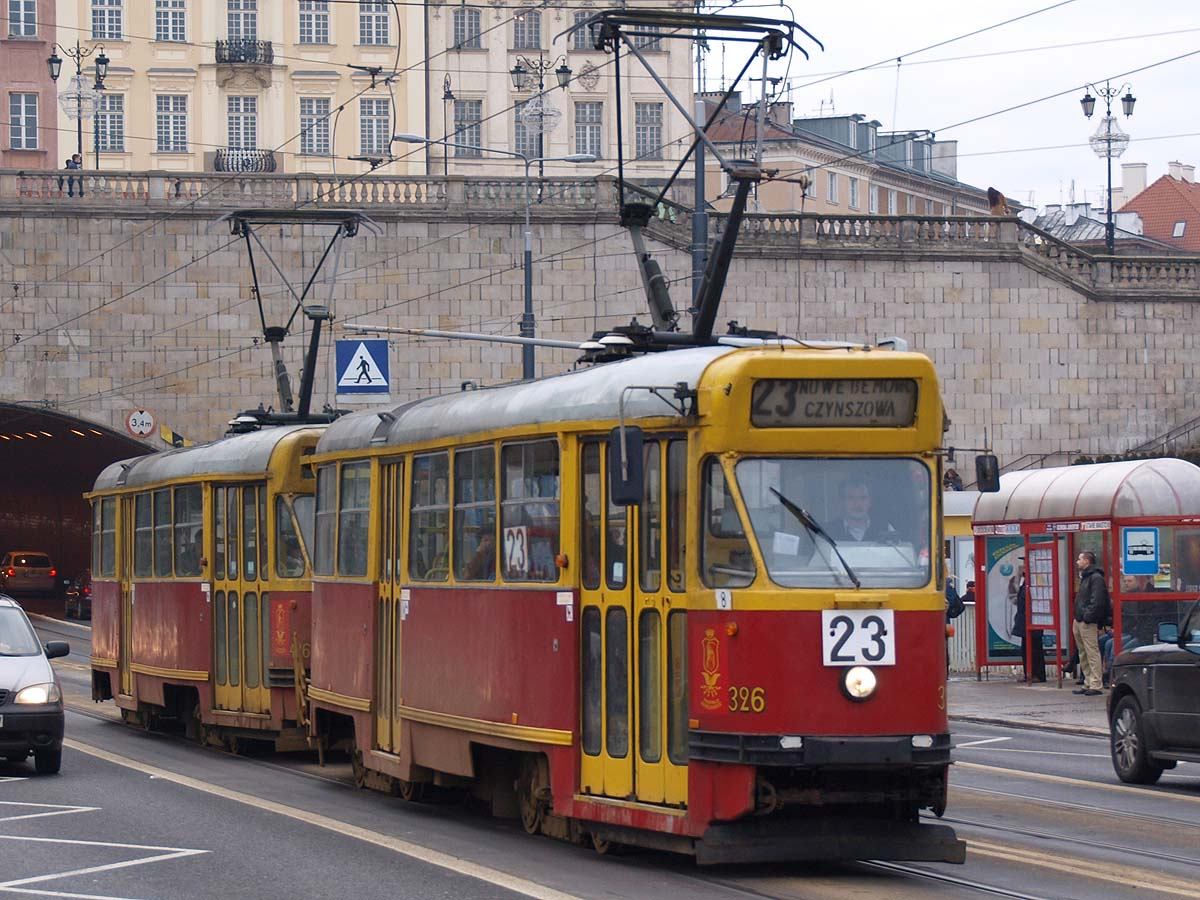
- Konstal 13N in Warsaw (2011)

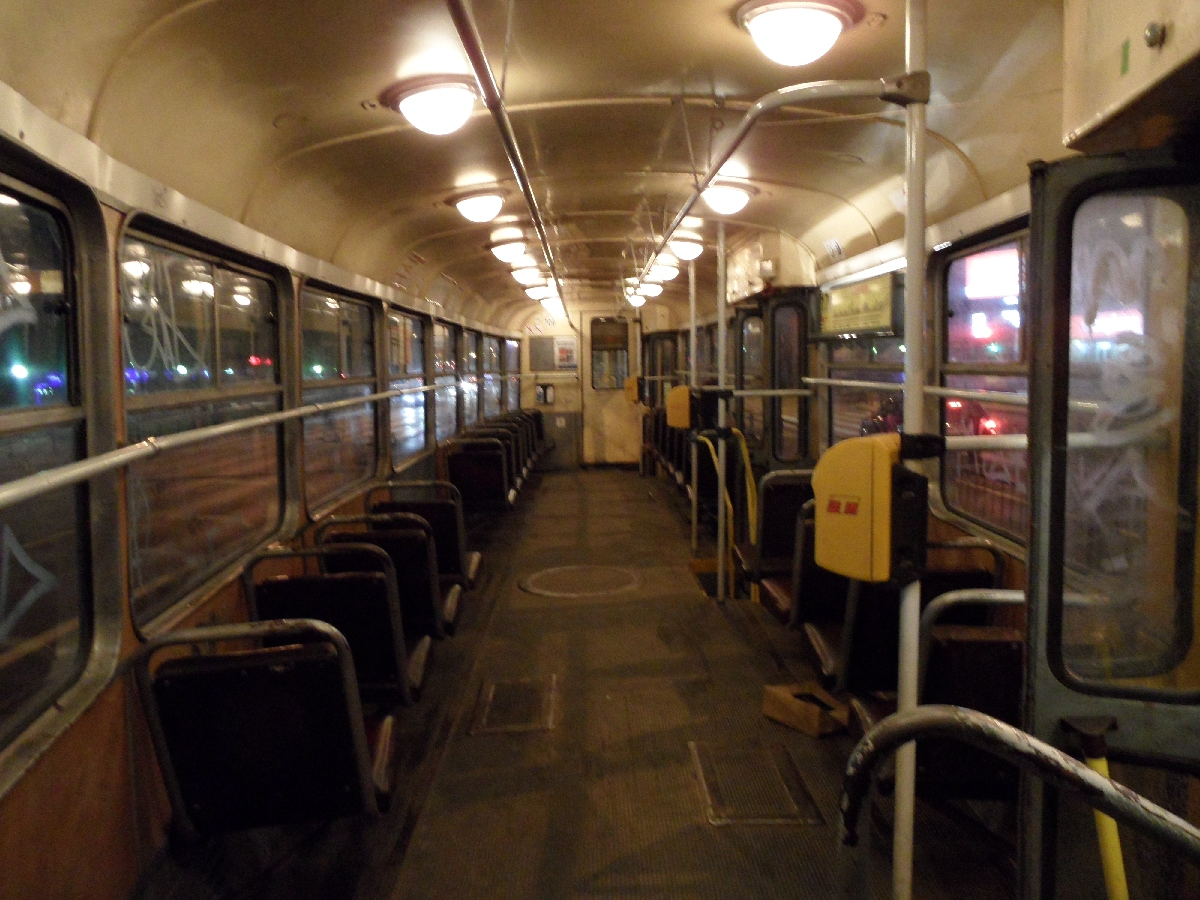
- Interior
- In service: 1959–2012
- Manufacturer: (Poland) Konstal
- Constructed: 1959–1969
- Number built: 842
- Number in service: Unknown (maintenance and historical cars)
- Number preserved: Several
- Capacity: 22 seats 100 standing

Specifications
- Train length: 13,300 mm (43 ft 8 in)
- Width: 2,400 mm (7 ft 10 in)
- Height: 3,076 mm (10 ft 1.1 in)
- Floor height: 850 mm (2 ft 9 in)
- Doors: 3
- Maximum speed: 68 km/h
- Weight: 18000 kg
- Power output: 4 x 41.5 kW
- Bogies: 2
- Track gauge: 1,435 mm (4 ft 8 1/2 in)

The Konstal 13N was an electric tram built by Konstal in Chorzów between 1959 and 1969 and used in Warsaw until 2012. The design borrowed heavily from the PCC-derived ČKD Tatra T1.

== History ==
After 1945, the tram networks in most Polish cities relied on small, slow, and outdated Konstal N trams. The N-class trams were intended as a temporary measure to improve the disastrous state of public transport in the aftermath of World War II, and were in fact based on a wartime German design, but all attempts at designing a better tram in Poland ended in failure.

In 1955, two Tatra T1 trams were bought by the Warsaw Transport Authority. In 1956, these were sent to the Konstal works in Chorzów for analysis, and formed the basis for the first Konstal prototype called 11N. The prototype was then modernized with a redesigned interior, Belgian ACEC electrical equipment, different wheels, and transmission. In 1959, the prototype was put into production as the 13N.

== Passenger service ==
Konstal 13N was a single-module unidirectional tram with three doors on the right side. It held 122 passengers and was capable of reaching 68 km/h. They were most often used in sets of two, though in peak times, and on particularly busy routes, sets of three were sometimes seen. Although early units suffered from reliability issues, these were soon rectified.

The 13N remained in production for 10 years, and in that time, 842 units were built – 838 of those served in Warsaw, and the other four in the Upper Silesian network. The 13N (together with the later 105Na) went on to form the backbone of the Warsaw tram fleet for over 50 years.

Due to their shape, they were nicknamed parówka (sausage) and given stock numbers 1-500 and 503-840 (the original Tatra T1 cars were numbered 501 and 502).

In the 21st century, with the need for more energy-efficient, easier-to-access low-floor trams, the 13N units were phased out and replaced by PESA 120Na. The last day of passenger service on a 13N was 31 December 2012.

== Later development ==
Konstal 13N also forms the basis for the company's other trams seen in all Polish cities with tram networks. Konstal 102N (produced 1967–1969) and the subsequent 102Na (1970–1973) are both articulated versions of the 13N, and the Konstal 105N started out as 13N in a more modern, lighter body.

== Today ==
No 13N trams remain in regular passenger service after 2012, but several serve as museum cars in Warsaw and Silesia. Due to their sturdiness, a number of 13Ns have also been rebuilt as track maintenance vehicles.

Vehicle number	Originally from	Current owner	Year of production	Historical since	Notes
115	Warszawa	MPK Poznań	1965	1998	Awaits renovation
407	Warszawa	Tramwaje Warszawskie	1967	2013	Restored to its state from the 1980s
503	Warszawa	Tramwaje Warszawskie	1959	2013	First car ever built, restored to its state from 1959
534	Warszawa	Tramwaje Warszawskie	1968	1996	Awaits renovation
535	Warszawa	Tramwaje Warszawskie	1968	2013	Awaits renovation
642	Warszawa	Tramwaje Warszawskie	1968	2012	Restored to its state from 1970s
795	Warszawa	Tramwaje Warszawskie	1969	1994	Restored to its state from 1960s
821+818	Warszawa	Tramwaje Warszawskie	1969	2013	Modernised in 1994, awaits renovation
308	Warszawa	Tramwaje Śląskie	1967	2013	Previously number #366 in Warsaw
400	Warszawa	MPK Kraków	1967		Awaits renovation

== Gallery ==
Gallery of Konstal 13N

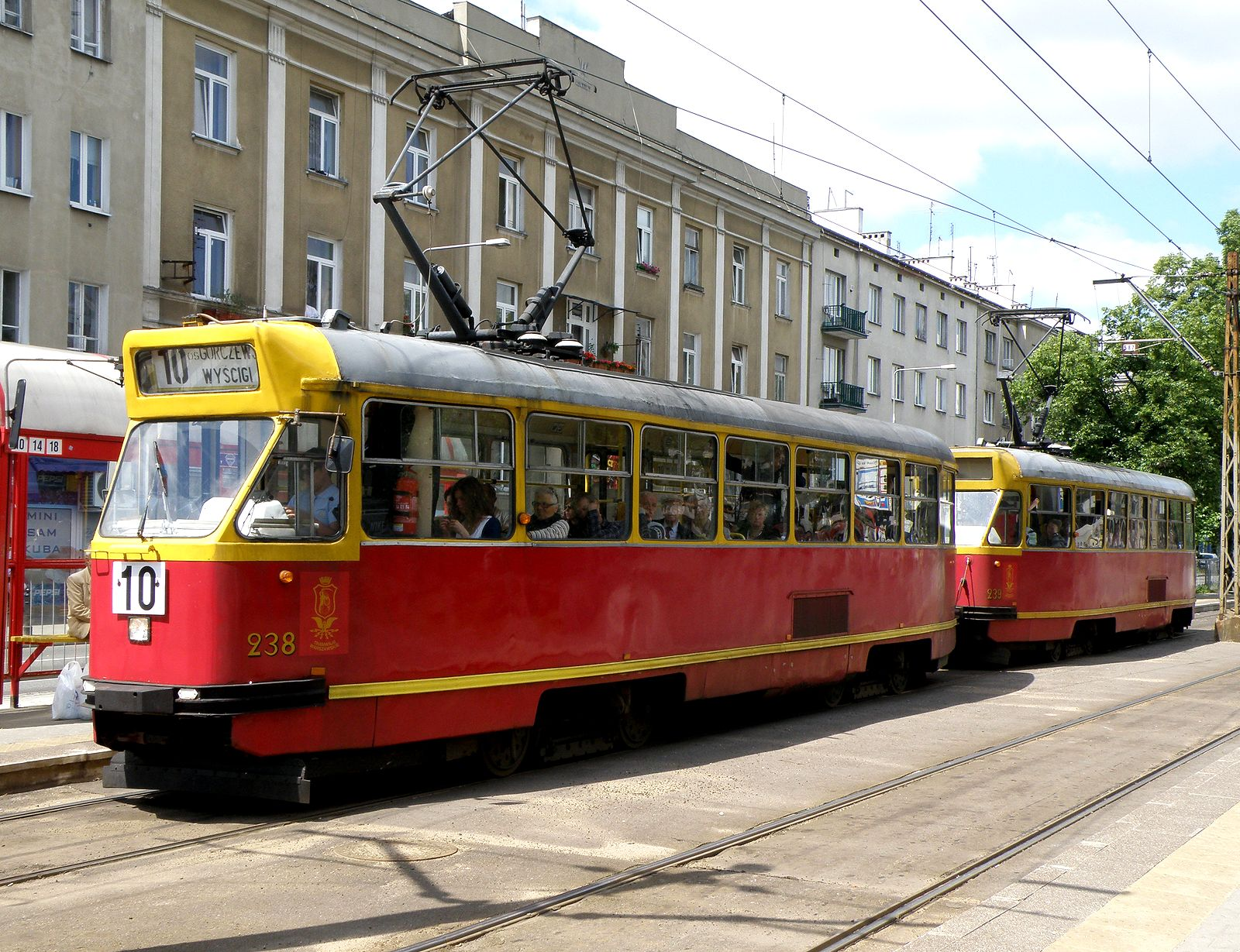
Konstal 13N in passenger service in Warsaw (2010)

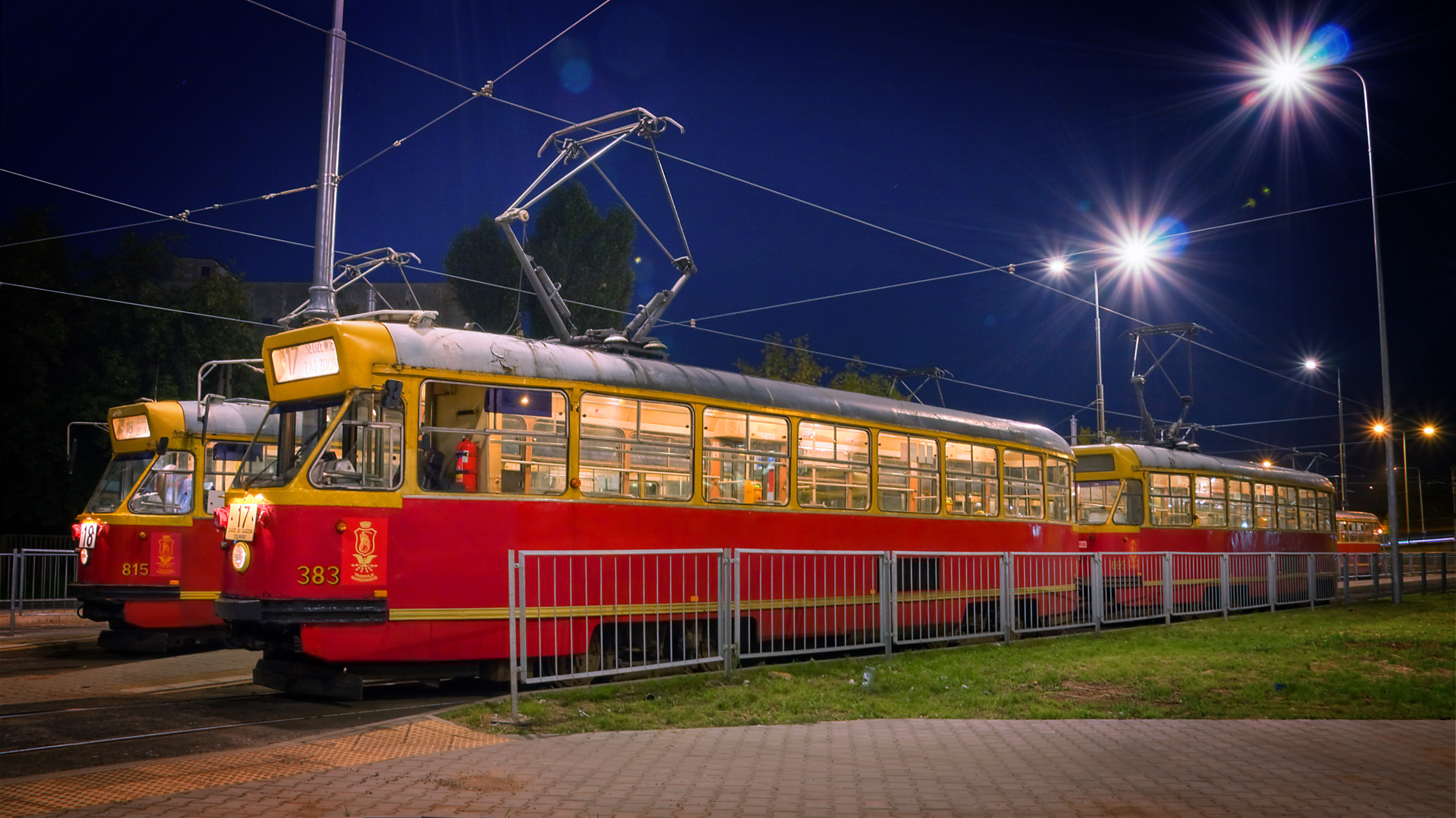
Konstal 13N at Służewiec terminus

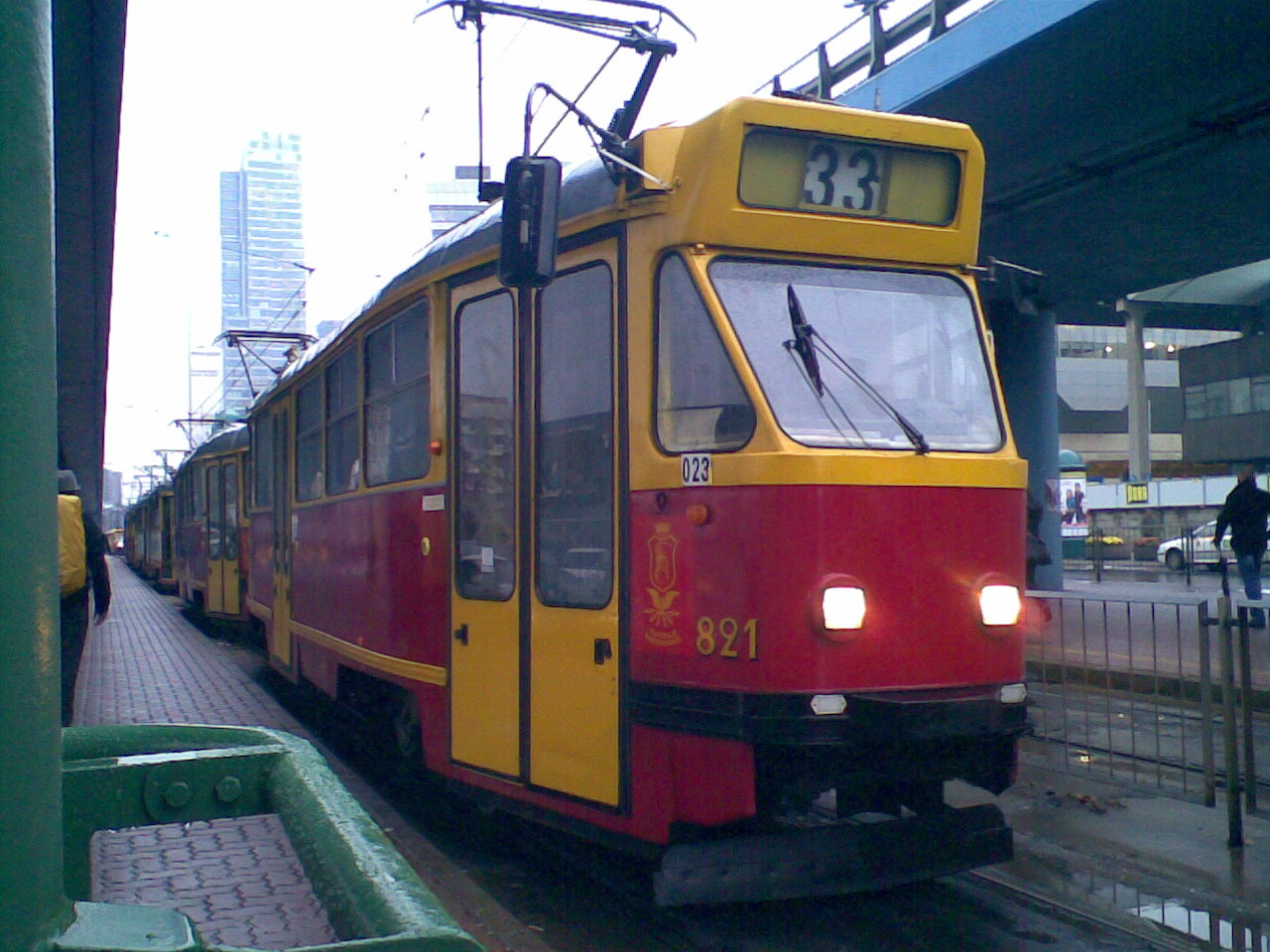
One set of 13N (#821+818) was facelifted in 1994; plans for further development were abandoned

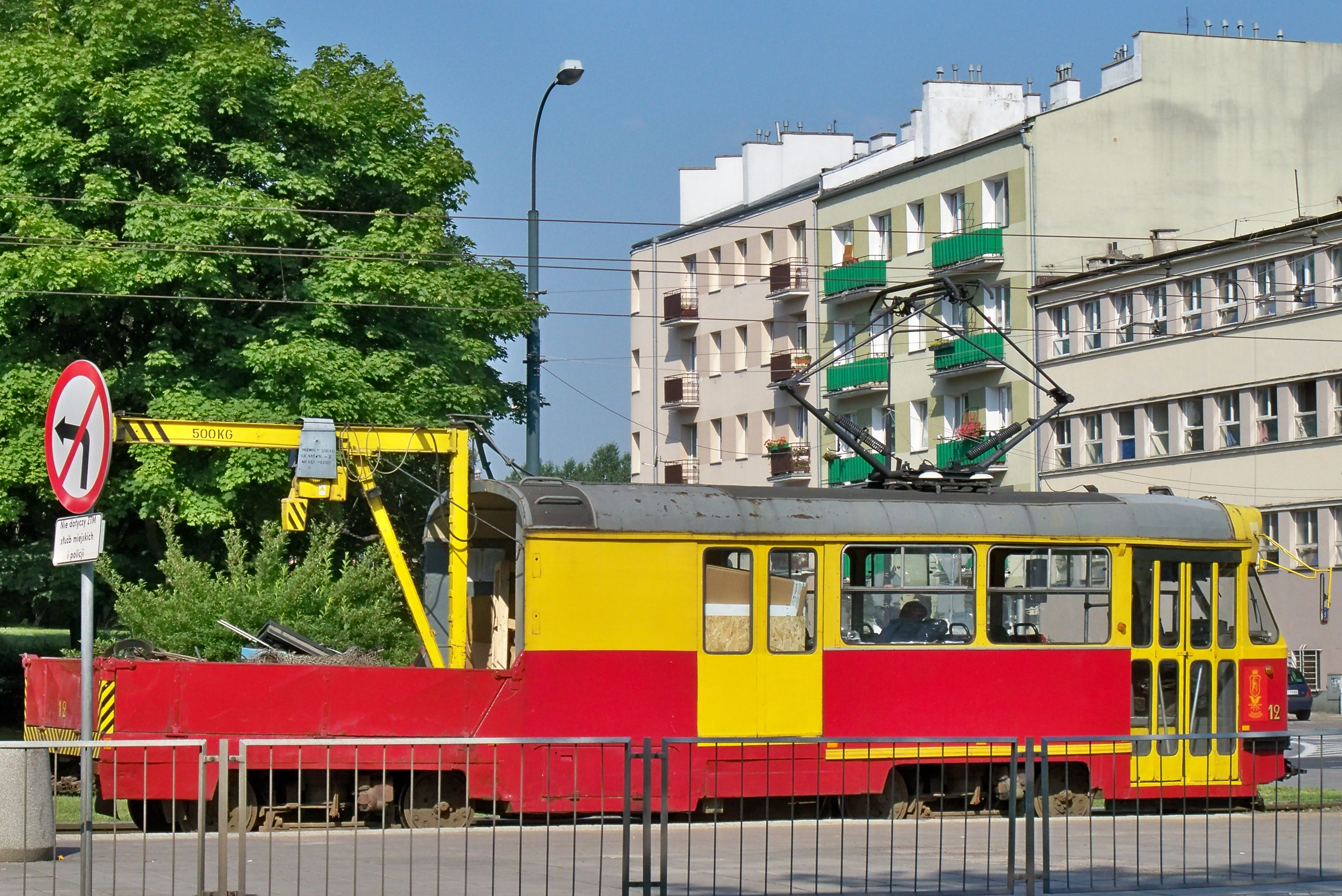
A number of 13Ns were rebuilt as maintenance vehicles (#12 shown here)

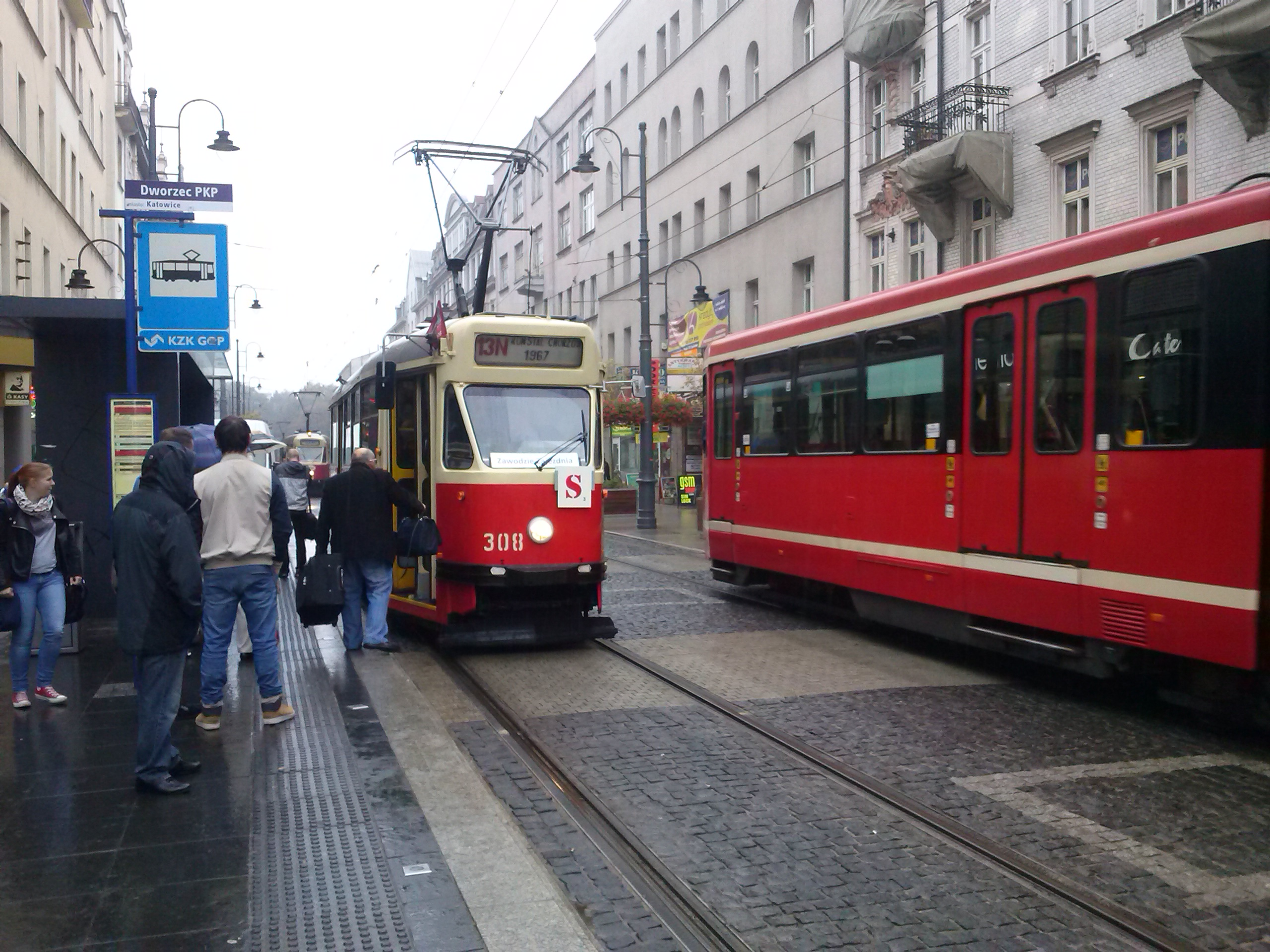
Former Warsaw #366 as a museum tram in Chorzów

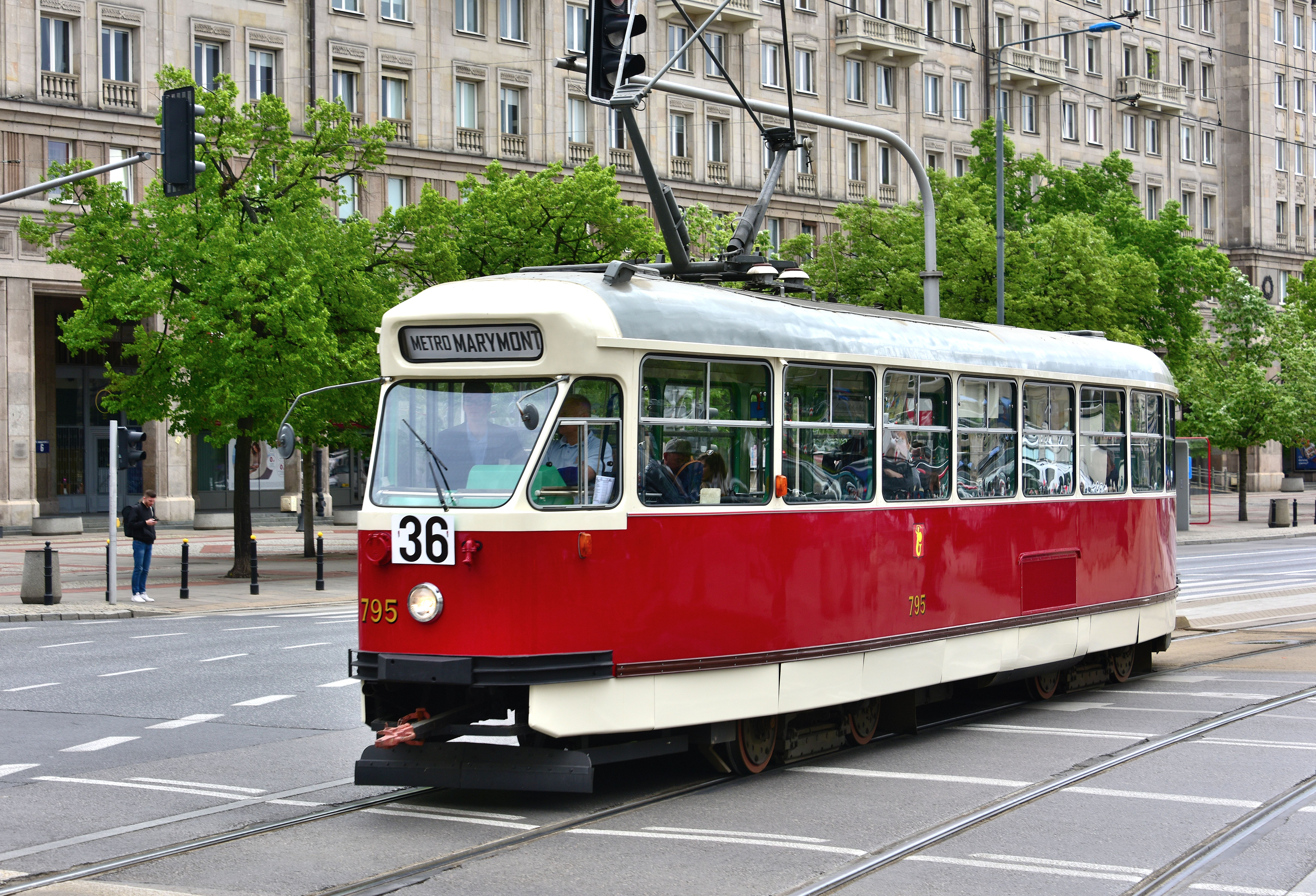
Museal tram number #795
