= Konstal 102N =

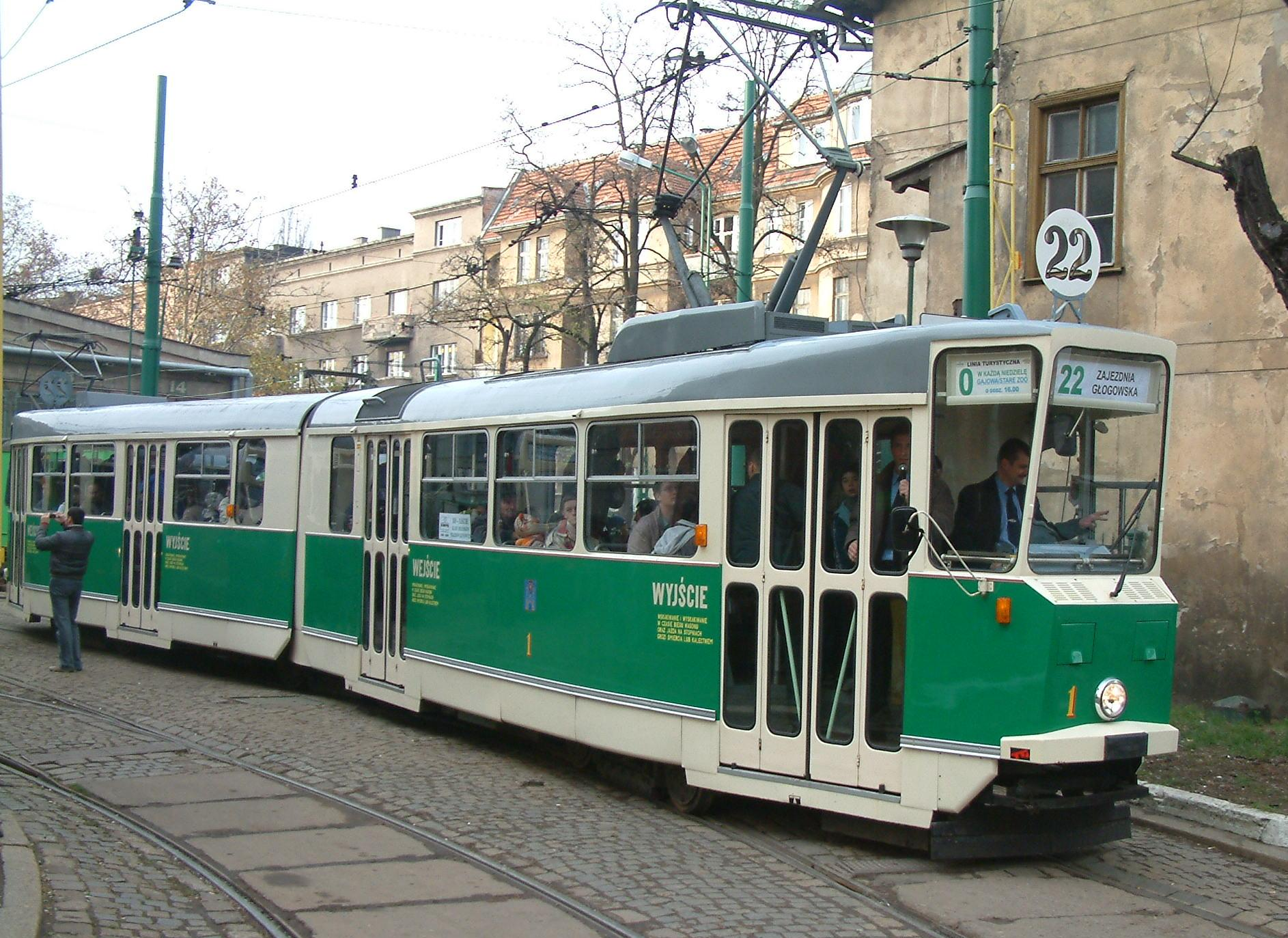
- A restored Konstal 102N in Poznań
- Manufacturer: (Poland) Konstal
- Constructed: 1969–1970
- Entered service: 1969
- Number built: 42+5
- Capacity: 32 seats; 153 standing

Specifications
- Train length: 19,300 mm (63 ft 3 3/4 in)
- Width: 2,400 mm (7 ft 10 1/2 in)
- Height: 3,076 mm (10 ft 1 in)
- Floor height: 890 mm (2 ft 11 in)
- Doors: 4
- Maximum speed: 68 km/h (42 mph)
- Weight: 25,900 kg (57,100 lb)
- Power output: 4 x 41.5 kW (56 hp)
- Bogies: 3
- Track gauge: 1,435 mm (4 ft 8 1/2 in), 1,000 mm (3 ft 3 3/8 in)

Konstal 102N was an electric tram built by Konstal in Chorzów between 1969 and 1970, replacing the Konstal 13N.

== History ==
Konstal 102N was directly descended from the older 13N produced by Konstal between 1959 and 1969, but, unlike 13N, it was an articulated tram - basically two 13N cars connected by a pivot. Most of the electrical equipment remained unchanged; the body of the tram is where the most dramatic changes were visible. The streamlined design of 13N was replaced by a more boxy shape which made for excellent visibility - unfortunately in daytime only. The large windscreen was tilted in such a way that at night-time it reflected light directly into the driver's eyes making the 102N difficult to drive after dark. This issue was ultimately to prove the downfall of the 102N, as after producing just 42 units the company decided to abandon the 102N project, and in 1970 reverted to the 13N look for the newer 102Na model.

== Konstal 802N ==
While most of the tram networks in Poland run on standard gauge tracks, there are a few that use the 1000 mm gauge. Konstal 802N was a version of 102N adapted to use on 1000 mm tracks, but only five units were built before the company decided to switch the production to a newer 803N model. 802N served in Bydgoszcz and Łódź until the late 1980s; the last one was scrapped in 1990.

== Passenger service ==
Konstal 102N was delivered to Kraków, Poznań, Wrocław, Gdańsk and the Silesian network, but due to visibility issues most of them were quickly withdrawn from service. Some were rebuilt to the 102Na standard, and others were converted to maintenance vehicles; the last 102N remained in service in Poznań until 2004.

== Today ==
Even though the 102N project proved a short-lived failure, their unusual, slightly peculiar look endeared them to many passengers. That is why a large number of 102N remain as museum trams in Kraków, Poznań, Gdańsk and Wrocław; even Warsaw, which never had 102N in revenue service, now has one as a museum exhibit (ex Poznań #5). The designers of the modern PESA 128N trams claim to have been inspired by Konstal 102N.

== Gallery ==
102N and 802N

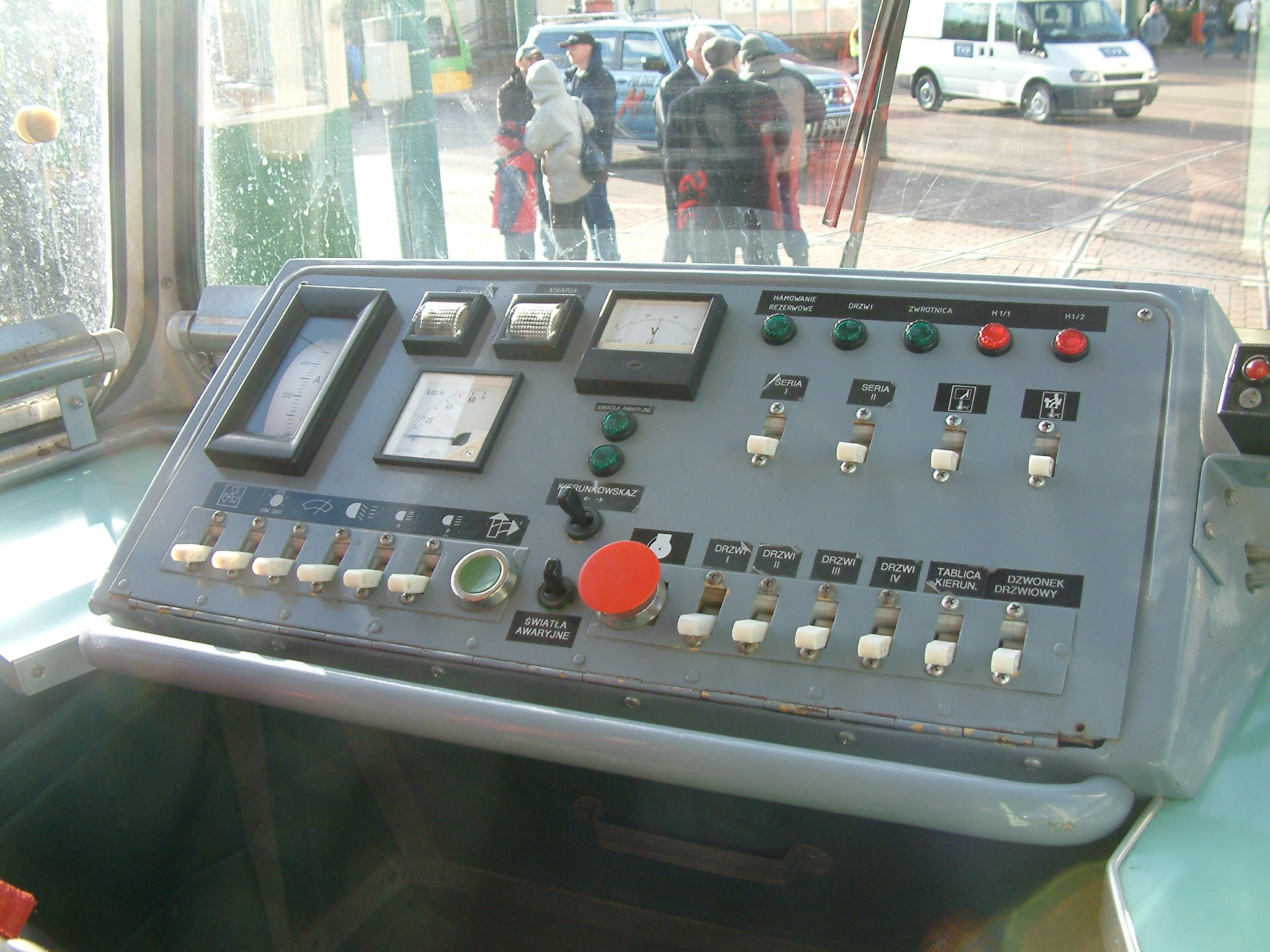
Control panel

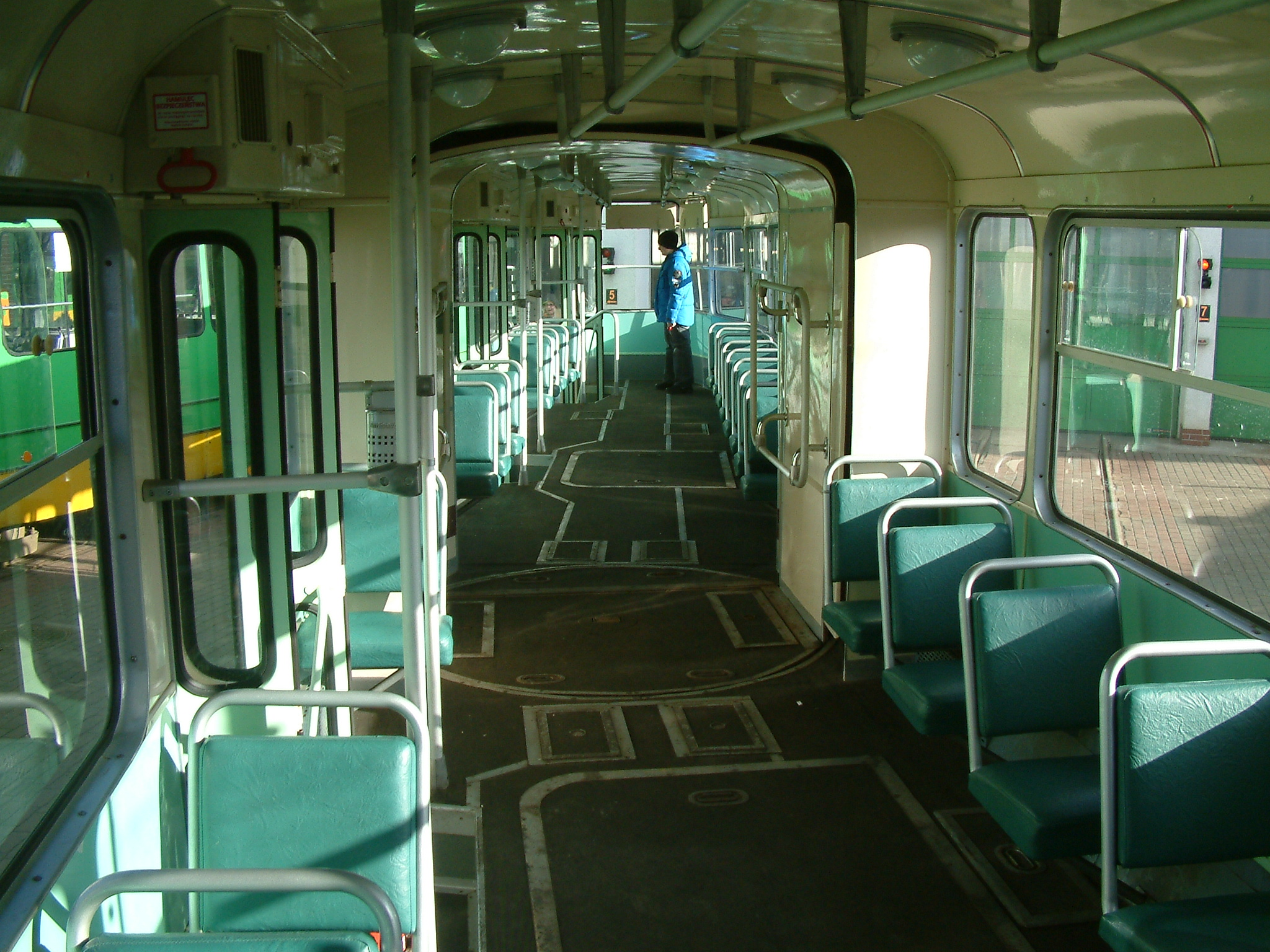
Interior

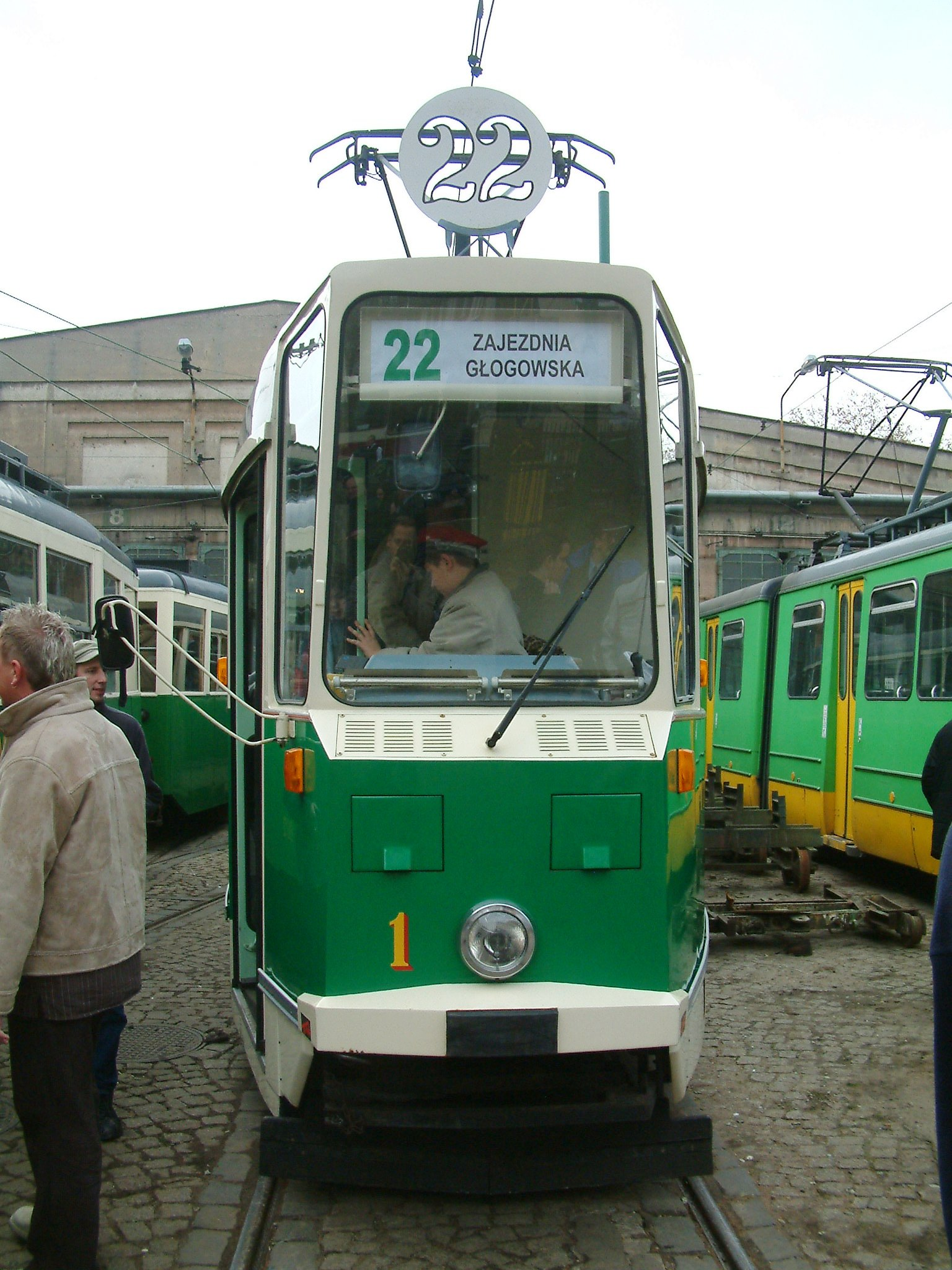
Front view

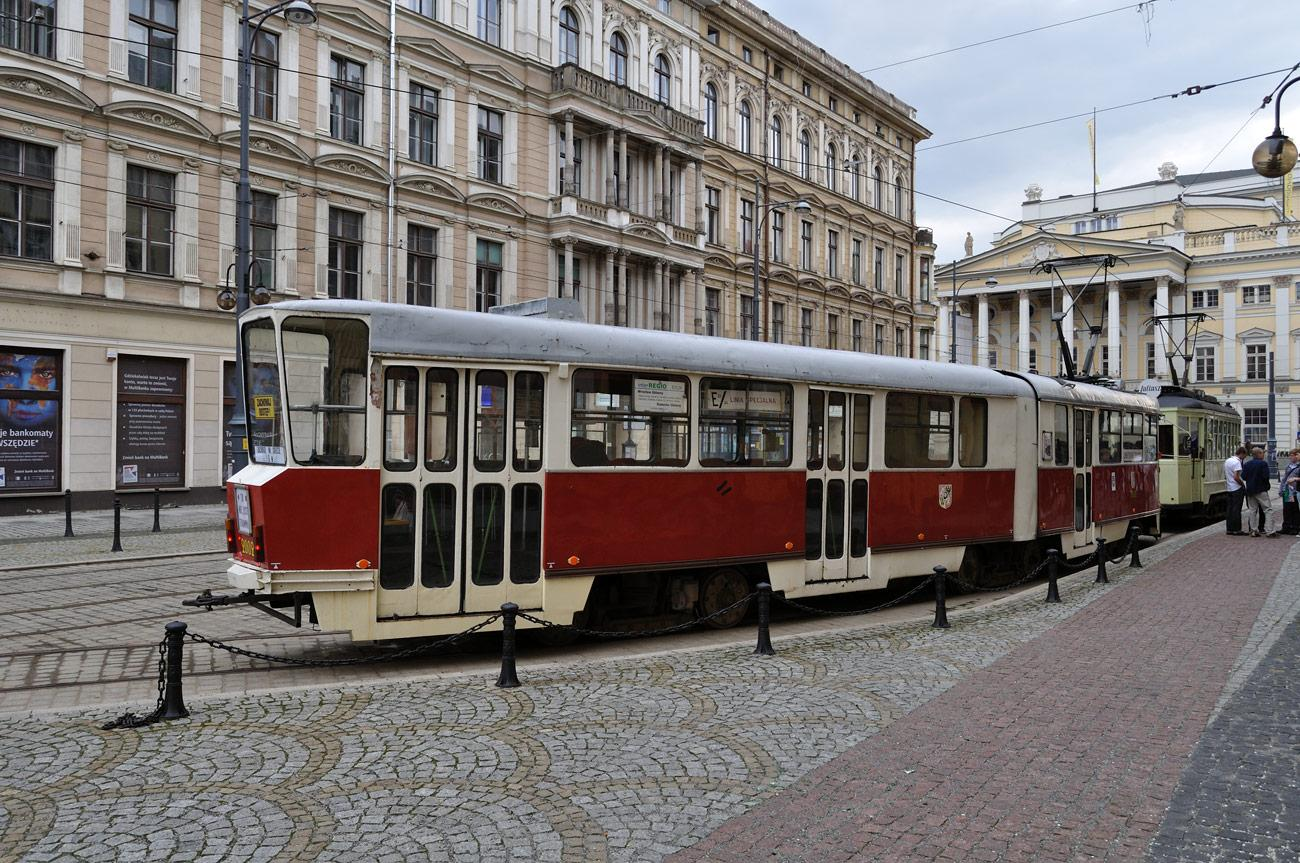
Rear view

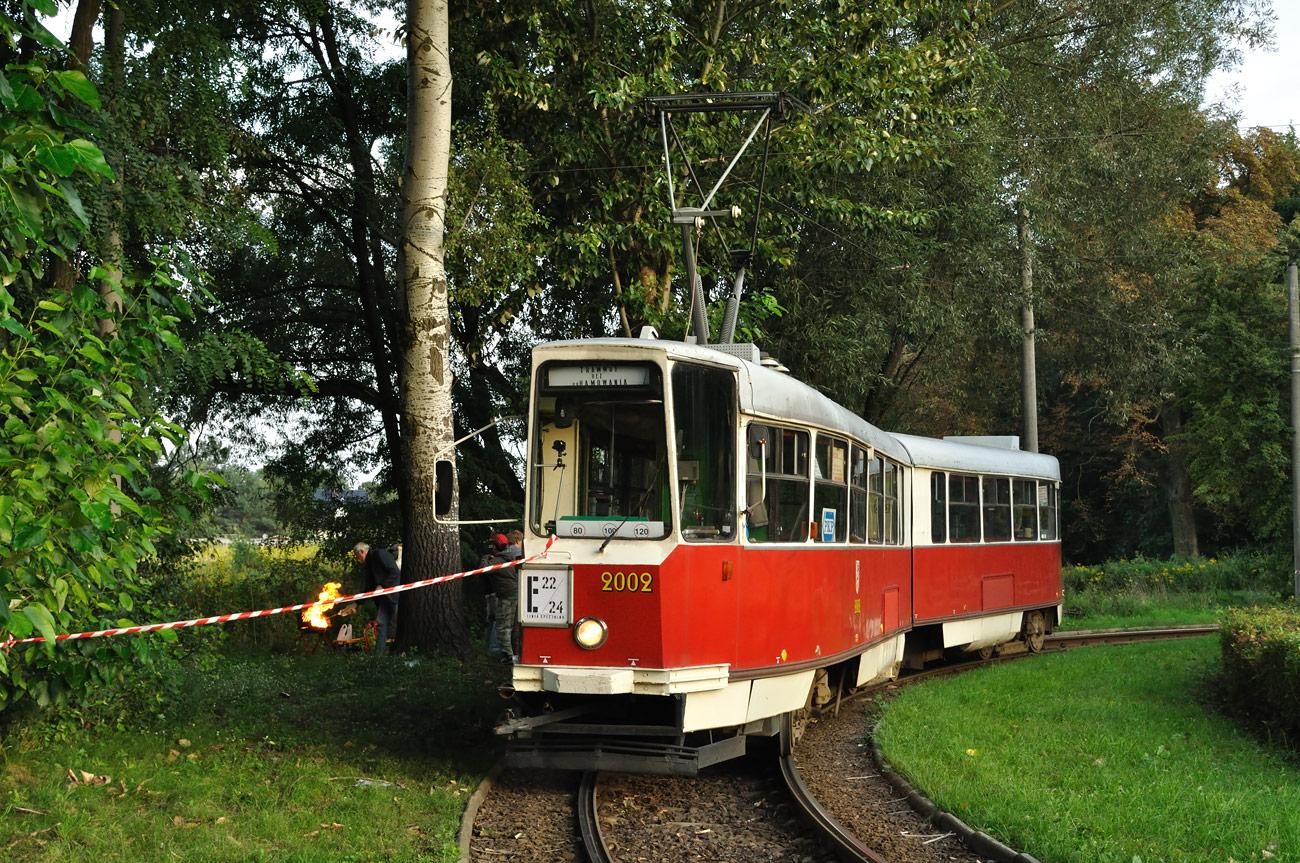
A restored 102N in Wrocław

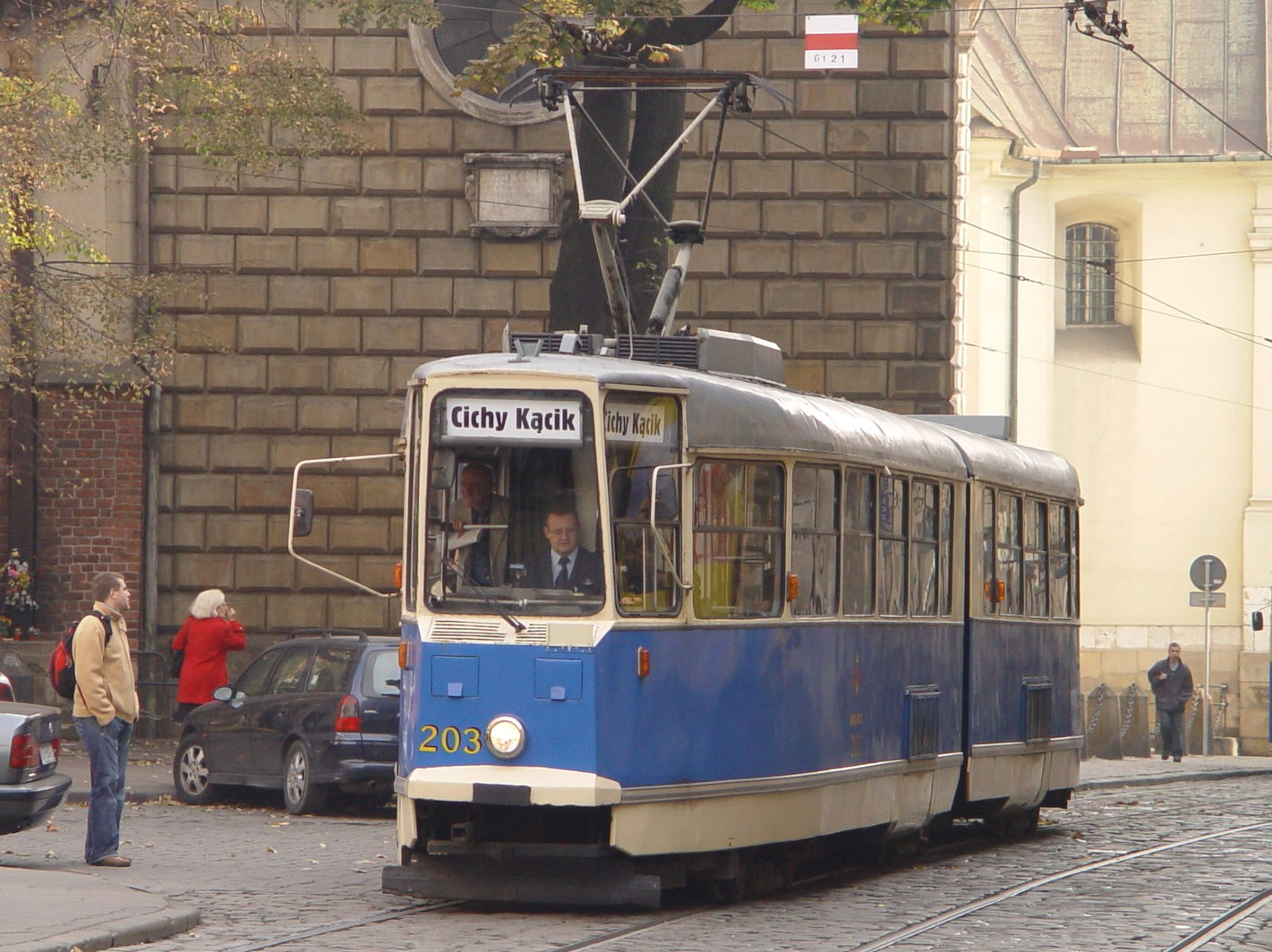
A museum 102N in Kraków

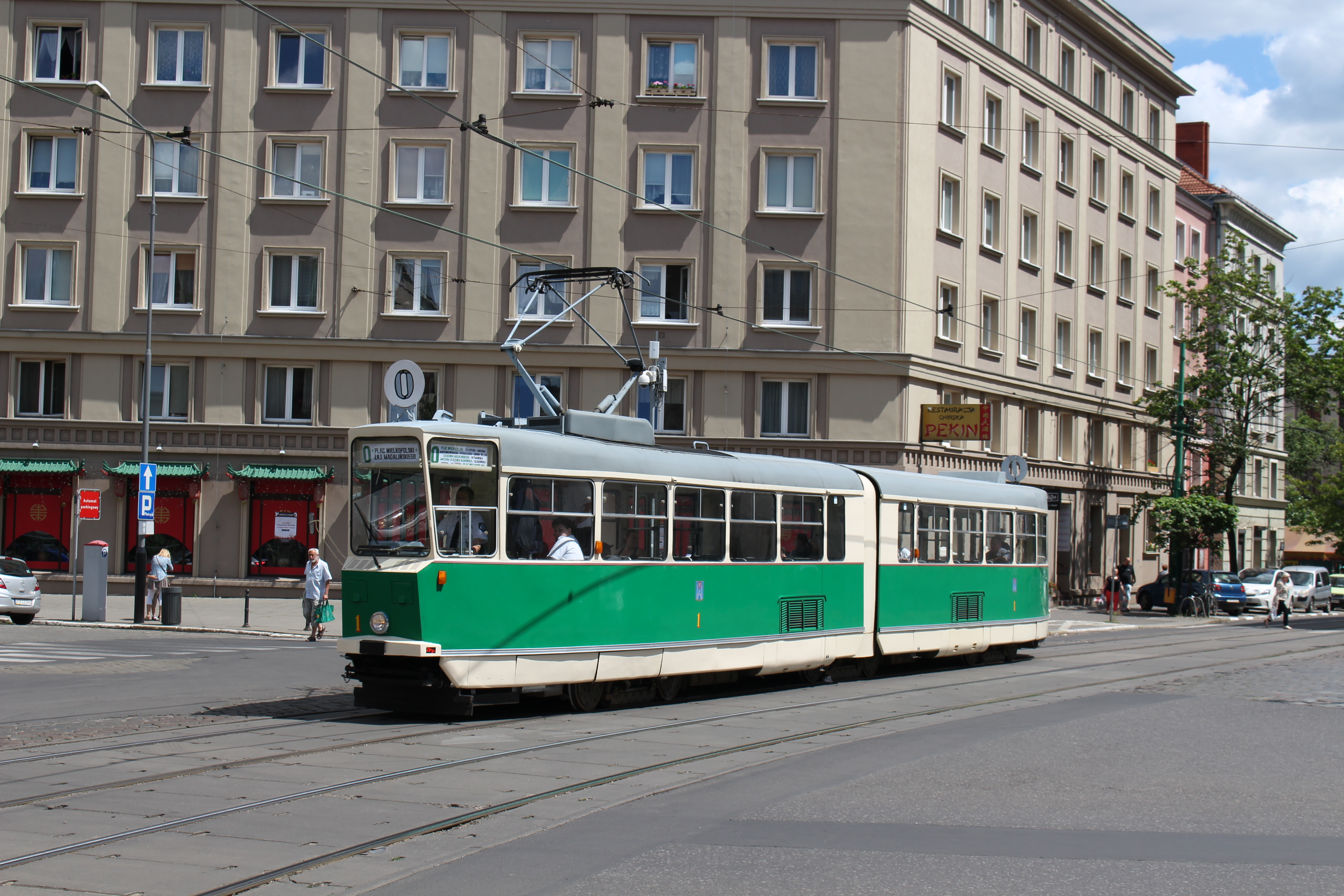
102N in Poznań

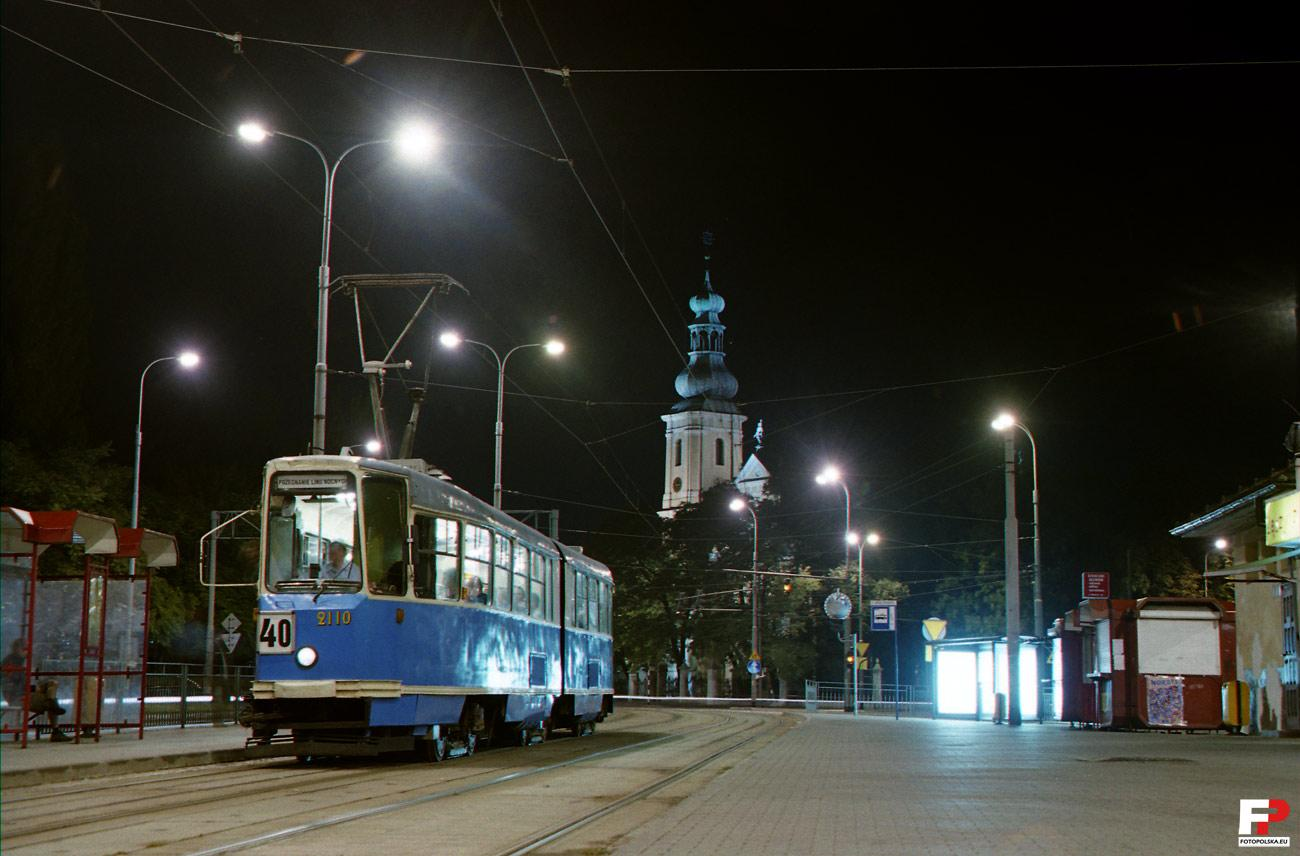
102N in Wrocław

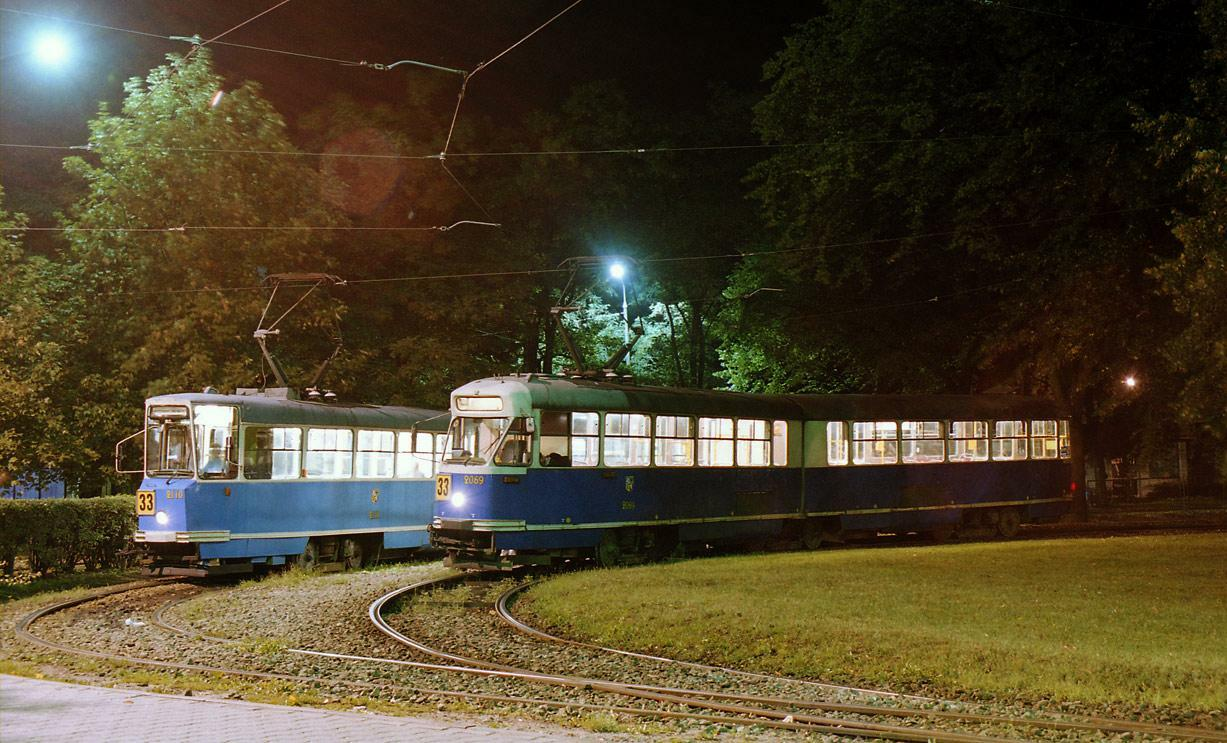
102N (left) and 102Na (right) in Wrocław

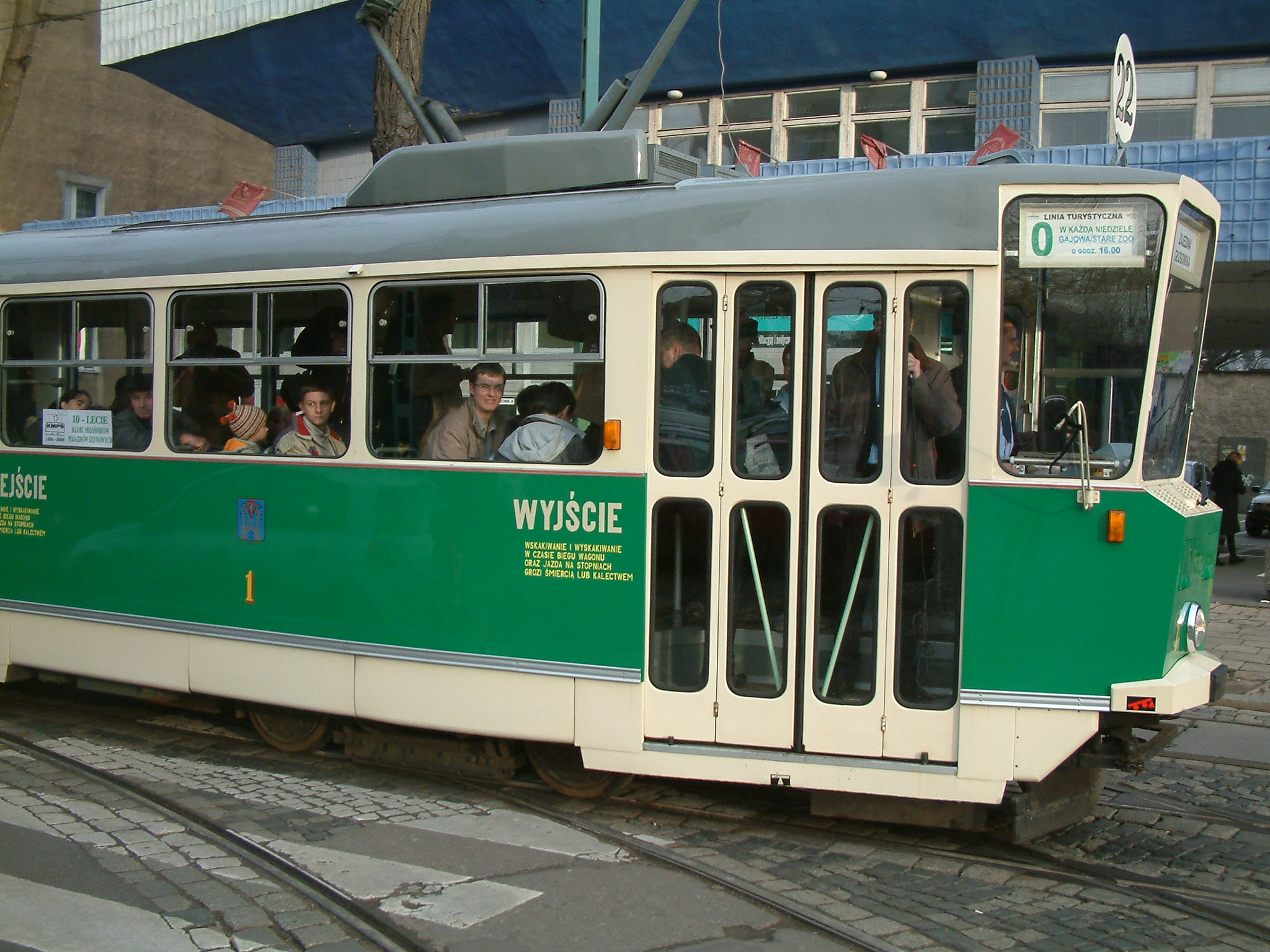
Note the tilted windscreen
