= Konstal =

Polish vehicle manufacturer based in Chorzów, Poland

- Company type: Subsidiary
- Industry: Rail transport
- Founded: 1917; 109 years ago (as separate company)
- Headquarters: ul. Metalowców 9; 41-500 Chorzów, Poland
- Area served: Worldwide
- Products: Trams; Rapid transit cars
- Parent: Alstom

Alstom Konstal is a company based in Chorzów, Poland producing rail vehicles, in particular metro cars and trams, as well as components for trains.

In 1864, the plant was founded as part of the Royal Steelworks in Chorzów and in 1917, it was excluded from its structures as a separate enterprise. During World War II, the factory belonged to the Reichswerke Hermann Göring produced for the needs of the army of the Third Reich, while during the Communist Period, as the Chorzów Steel Structures Factory Konstal, it was the main supplier of trams for Poland. In 1995, the company's shares were transferred to the National Investment Funds, after which the plant began cooperation with the Linke-Hofmann-Busch factory belonging to the French Alstom concern.

In 1997, the company was bought out by Alstom, and a year later, simultaneously with the change of its name to Alstom, the Polish factory adopted its current name.

== History ==
=== Origins and beginnings of activity ===
In 1864, the Processing Workshops (German: Verarbeitungswerkstätte) were established in connection with the intensive development of railways in Upper Silesia in the 1860s. These workshops were created as a production department of the Royal Steelworks in Chorzów (German: Königshütte) and placed on the site of a former steel rolling mill. Their first iteration included processing of steel produced in the steelworks into various accessories for tracks and rolling stock.

In 1901, the production department of stamped sheet metal products was launched, and in 1908, departments of spring production and railway turnouts launched. In July 1917, the workshops were excluded from the organizational structure of the Royal Steelworks, because at that time the production of the factory differed from the activity of the raw material smelter. The established independent company was named the Royal Steelworks Workshop Board (German: Werkstättenverwaltung Königshütte).

=== Interwar period ===
In 1922, a part of Upper Silesia was annexed by Poland, where most of the mines, smelters and factories belonging to the company of united steelworks were located. At that time, its name was polonized to the Upper Silesian United Royal Steelworks and Laura in Katowice, but nevertheless remained in the hands of German ownership. The unstable economic situation of the refounded Poland and the customs war with Germany, which in 1925 led to the suspension of exports from Poland to Germany, caused a decline in production.

In 1936, a four-axle motor car of the ESCx series called Luxtorpeda was built, and in 1939, Konstal welded first boxes of passenger cars.

=== Second World War ===
After the entry of German troops in 1939 and 1940, the administration and property of the Community of Mining and Metallurgical Interests came under the receivership of the state-owned Reichswerke A.G. für Berg- und Hüttenbetriebe Hermann Göring. The Processing Workshops became part of it and adopted the name Górnośląskie Zakłady Metalowe Spółka Akcyjna Huty Królewskiej/Górny Śląsk (German: Oberschlesische Metallwerke Aktien-Gesellschaft Königshütte/Oberschlesien, abbreviated as Osmag). Poles were fired from managerial positions with several hundred workers deported deep into Germany for forced labor and several dozen, mainly former participants of the Silesian uprisings, were sent to labor camps.

In connection with the change of the current production of the plant, to production for the needs of the Third Reich, the bridge construction department was adapted to the production of guns, and a galvanizing plant was erected in the place of the railway turnout department. The wagon department, on the other hand, produced segments of submarine hulls, dry docks and gun chassis. Apart from Polish workers, prisoners of war and concentration camp prisoners were also employed. In the last days of the occupation, the Germans planned to destroy the factory, but eventually managed to take away 120 machine tools and other equipment, destroying the boiler room, the power plant, air compressors and means of transport.

On 27 January 1945, Chorzów was occupied by Soviet troops. On the premises of the plant, which was the site of the fighting, there were corpses and buildings were damaged. The administrative building at the main gate was destroyed. Severe frosts caused damage to the water supply and central heating and compressed air pipes. Renovation works and cleaning of the factory area have commenced shortly thereafter.

On 5 February 1945, the first boiler was put into operation, which supplied steam for central heating. Four days later, the compressed air system was repaired, which allowed the jackhammer to start and start production to a limited extent. The first to start its activity was the bridge construction department, which in the same month rebuilt the bridge in Chorzów Batory. Shortly after, the wagon construction department was reopened. Konstal, under the name of Processing Workshops obtained first orders from different regions of the country. A renovation team was sent to Warsaw, which was tasked with the removal of the remains of the destroyed Poniatowski Bridge from the Vistula riverbed. At the same time, new spans for this bridge were being built in the factory, and in addition, the repairs of damaged Warsaw trams and the production of new coal trucks began.

=== Mostowagon and Konstal (1945-1997) ===
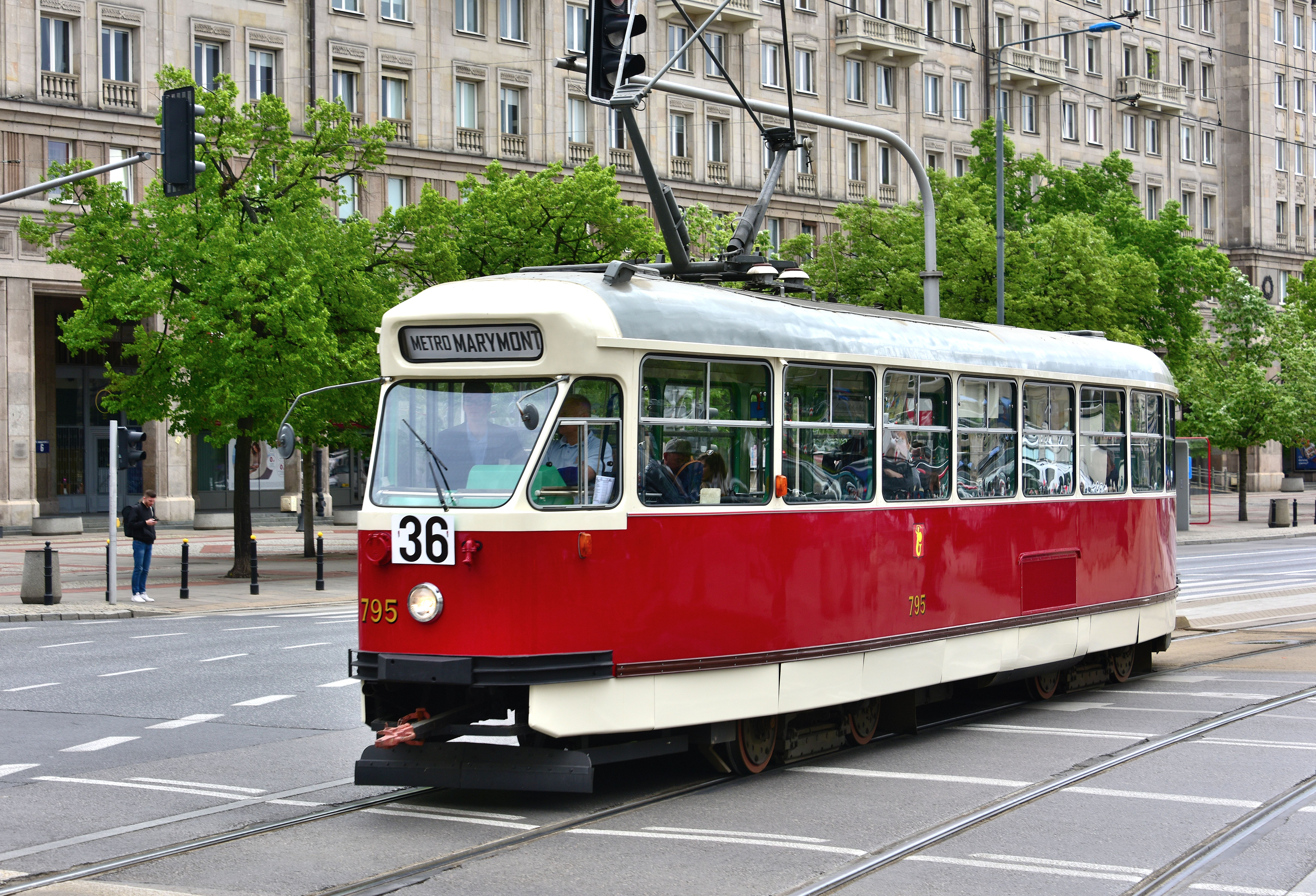
Konstal 13N (1959–1969)

After the end of the war, the factory was given the name Chorzów Wytwórnia Mostów i Wagonów (abbreviated as Mostowagon). At the end of 1945, the plant employed 1853 people, and at the beginning of 1946, 2812 people worked in the factory.

In the first post-war years, the basic production of the factory consisted of bridge spans, steel structures, freight and tram cars, as well as railway and tram turnouts. On 1 May 1946, Mostowagon delivered the first 100 post-war coal mines to Polish State Railways (PKP). In 1946, a new trolley construction department was launched.

Poland, rebuilding itself from the destruction of World War II, needed serial production of trams. On 17 October 1946, a conference on this issue was held in Katowice and it was decided that the construction of the new type of wagon would be modeled on the German two-axle KSW wagon. Between 1946 and 1947, a specially appointed commission developed a complete technical documentation of the standard-gauge motor tram type N and trailer type ND, and at the same time, a narrow-gauge version, 2N and 2ND was also designed.

In 1947, the factory was taken over by the state treasury, and renamed to Konstal on 15 September 1948. The name however wasn't adopted until 14 December 1948. First prototype of the 13N tram was produced (loosely based on the Tatra T1) in 1959, and last built N trams left the factory in 1962. Shortly after, Konstal made short series 14N, 15N and WPK trams. In 1967, a prototype of an articulated tram type 102N was created, and in 1970, the first 102Na tramcar left the factory.

At the beginning of the 90s, work was carried out on a tram with a partially lowered floor. Konstal's result was the production in 1995 of a prototype wagon type 112N, and then in 1997, the production of two 114Na trams.

On 24 July 1995, the company was included in the list of state-owned companies listed in the Prime Minister's Regulation, whose shares will be transferred to the National Investment Funds. On 23 October 1995, the general meeting of shareholders of Konstal adopted a resolution on the transfer of the company's shares to the NFI, and on 31 October 1995, the resolution was registered by the court. Of the total 1,360,000 shares, 60% were transferred to the NFI, 25% were held by the state treasury and 15% were in the hands of employees.

=== Alstom Konstal (1997-present) ===
Shortly after the transfer of Konstal's shares to NFI, the Linke-Hofmann-Busch plant in Salzgitter (part of the GEC Alsthom Group) was looking for a partner in Central Europe. After considering various companies, the Chorzów plant was selected, which was commissioned to produce 580 chassis for freight wagons. In December 1996, a general meeting of shareholders was held, in which a decision was taken to increase the share capital of Konstal to make room for the possibility of a GEC Alsthom takeover. Polish interior ministry approved this resolution on 21 February 1997. Seven days later, GEC Alsthom bought 60% of the shares from NFI. In June 1997, GEC Alsthom bought out state treasury and employee shares.

On 22 June 1998, GEC Alsthom became simply Alstom, and the Chorzów plant rebranded as Alstom Konstal. Together with administrative changes, workshops received several structural upgrades. Towards the end of 1990s, Alstom Konstal employed close to 900 workers.

At the beginning of its activity as an international holding company, Alstom Konstal started producing new types of freight wagons, however the production of trams was still key to the factory. Between 1998 and 2001, the company supplied Polish cities with low-floor wagons of types 116N, NGd99 as well as 116Nd and high-floor 105N2k/2000 trams. A lack of further orders paused the production of trams in Chorzów. The 105N family became the longest and most produced tram in Poland – between 1973 and 2001, a total of nearly 3500 wagons were built in over 20 standard and narrow-gauge varieties.

At the beginning of the twenty-first century, Alstom decided that the Chorzów plant would not be a universal factory. Alstom decided to give the workshop a new speciality. Alstom Konstal, in addition to the production of trams, was to deal with the construction of metro cars.

In search of further orders, the company took part in various tenders. Between 2001 and 2005, the company produced and delivered 14 Metropolis 98B trains for the Warsaw metro. By 2005, the plant had completed orders for Citadis trams for Istanbul and Metropolis metro trains for Budapest and Amsterdam. At the beginning of 2017, it was decided that Alstom Konstal would produce metro trains for Dubai. In connection with the implementation of this project, it was announced that the plant will be expanded with a second, separate production line. In May of that year, the company employed over 1200 people.

At the end of November 2018, a new assembly line was opened for the production of Intercity Next Generation trains (Coradia Stream) ordered in July 2016 by the Dutch national carrier Nederlandse Spoorwegen.

In 2023, Alstom's operations in Poland were consolidated under a single company, Alstom Polska S.A. Since then, the plant has operated as the Chorzów branch of this company.

== Products ==
=== Trams ===
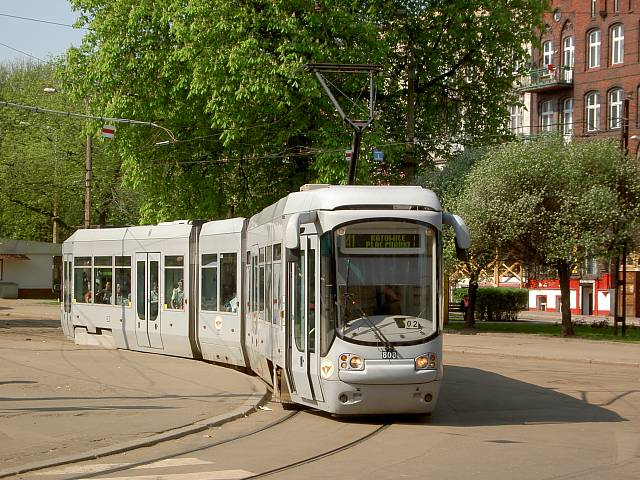
Alstom Citadis 116Nd in Silesia (2000–2001)

Series	Trams
Konstal N	N • ND • 2N • 2ND • 4N • 4ND • 5N • 5ND • WPK • PN • 2PN
Konstal 13N/102N	13N • 102N • 102NW • 802N • 102Na • 102NaW • 803N
Konstal 105N	105N • 105NWr • 805Nm • 105Na • 105NaW • 805Na • 105N2k/2000 • 106N • 106Na • 111N
Low-floor trams	112N • 114Na • 116N • 116Na
Alstom Citadis series	100 • X-04

=== Metro ===
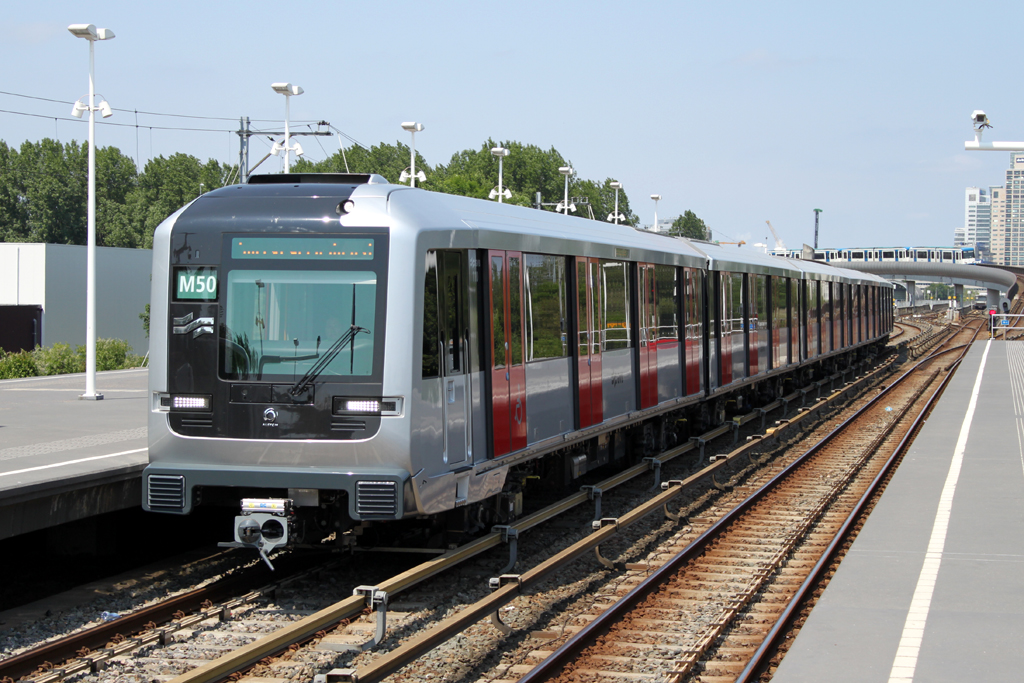
Alstom Metropolis M5 (2011–2015)

Metro wagons produced since 2001
Model	Operator	Production	Trains
Alstom Metropolis 98B	Warsaw	2001–2004	14
Alstom Metropolis AM5-M2	Budapest	2007–2011	22
Alstom Metropolis AM4-M4	Budapest	2012–2013	15
Alstom Metropolis M5	Amsterdam	2011–2015	28
Alstom Metropolis	Riyadh	2015–2019	69
Alstom Metropolis	Dubai	from 2017	50

== See also ==
- Pesa SA
- PCC streetcar
