= Protram =

Polish rail company

- Company type: Subsidiary
- Industry: Rail transport
- Founded: 1976; 50 years ago
- Defunct: 2016
- Fate: Bankruptcy
- Headquarters: Wrocław, Poland
- Area served: Worldwide
- Products: Locomotives; High-speed trains Intercity and commuter trains Trams; People movers Signalling systems

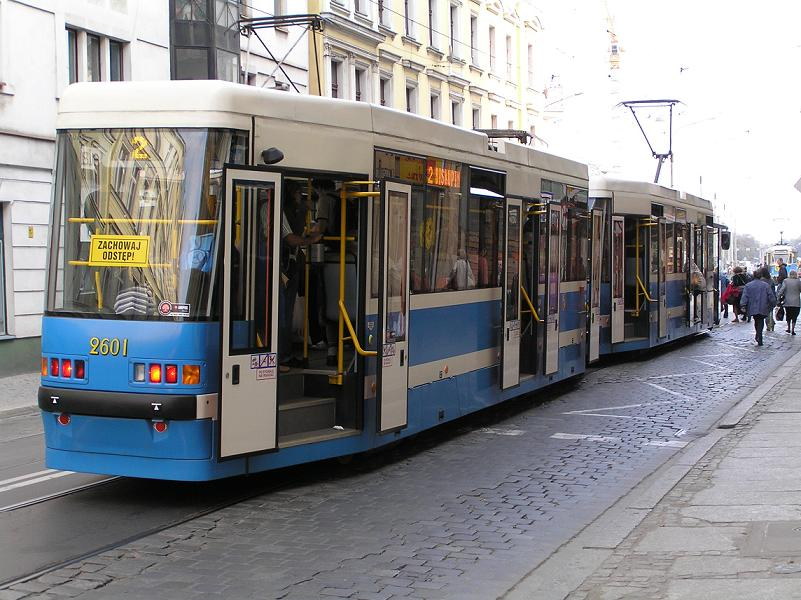
Protram 204WrAs on Wrocław street

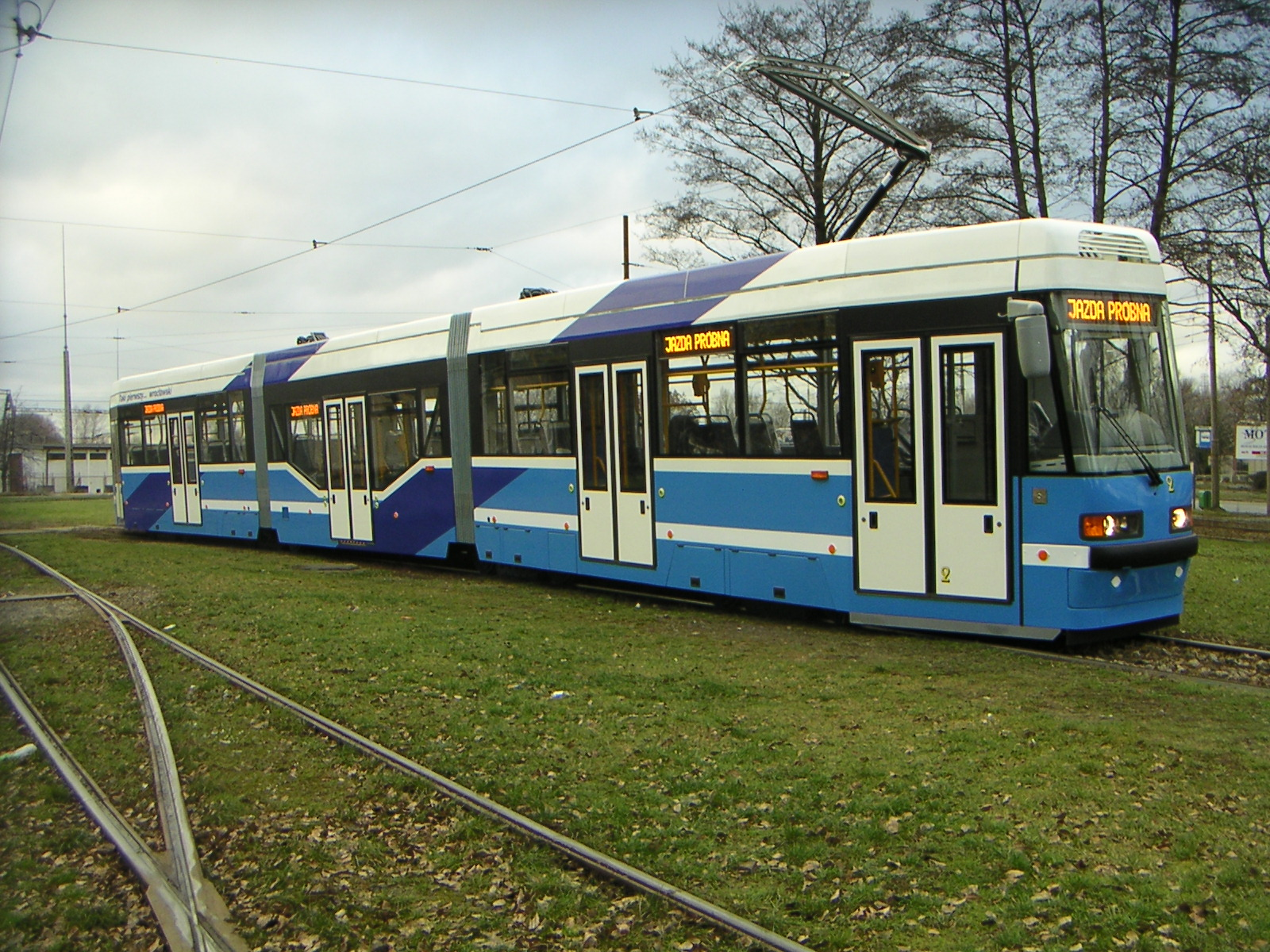
Protram 205WrAs

Protram Remonty i Modernizacja Tramwajów Protram Wrocław Sp. z o.o. was a Polish company that specialised in production and modernisation of rail equipment. The company was founded in 1999 in Wrocław after the rail maintenance department of MPK Wrocław was privatised. The company filed for bankruptcy in 2016 and was eventually liquidated.

== Products ==
There are 3 models of trams constructed by Protram:

- 204 WrAs
- 205 WrAs
- 206 WrAs - In project phase

They are responsible for the modernisation of Konstal 105Na units into Konstal 105NWr as well.
