= Škoda 19 T =

Two-way tram

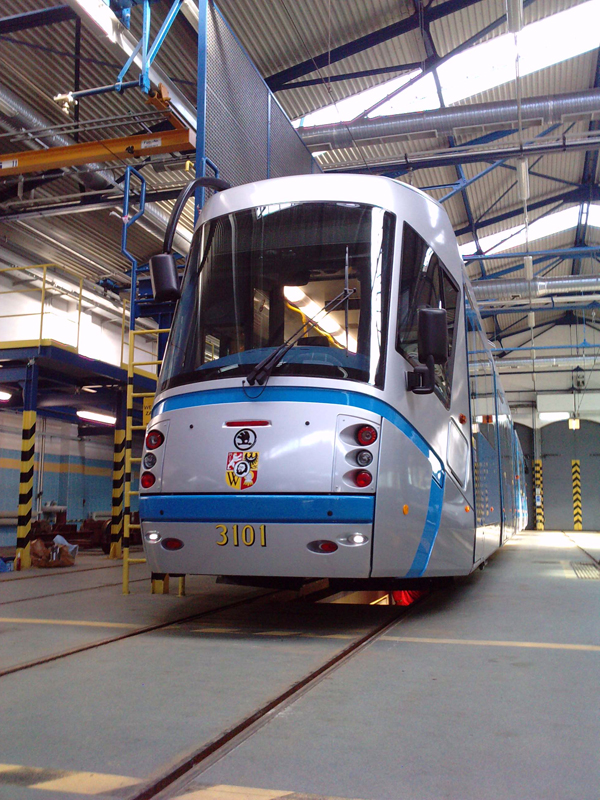
- Manufacturer: Škoda Transportation
- Designer: Porsche Design Group
- Assembly: Plzeň, Czech Republic
- Family name: Škoda Elektra
- Constructed: 2010–2011
- Number built: 31
- Predecessor: Škoda 16 T
- Successor: Škoda 26 T
- Capacity: 51 (Seated); 241 (Standing)

Specifications
- Train length: 30,250 mm (99 ft 3 in)
- Width: 2,460 mm (8 ft 1 in)
- Height: 3,400 mm (11 ft 2 in)
- Floor height: 350 mm (13.78 in); 780 mm (30.71 in)
- Low-floor: 65%
- Doors: 12
- Articulated sections: 4 (5 body sections)
- Maximum speed: 70 km/h (43 mph)
- Weight: 37.4 t (36.8 long tons; 41.2 short tons)
- Power output: 380 kW (510 hp) (4 × 95 kW or 127 hp)
- Bogies: 3 x fixed
- Minimum turning radius: 25 m (82 ft)/20 m (66 ft)
- Track gauge: 1,435 mm (4 ft 8 1/2 in)

The Škoda 19 T is a five carbody section low-floor bi-directional tram, developed by Škoda Transportation for Wrocław.

The tram is not different from currently used Škoda 16 T trams, except for the fact that it has two driver's cabins and doors on both sides of the tra mim. It also features more CCTV, place for bicycles and baggage in the centre section, and the seats in the end sections are located in the driving direction, not sideways as the predecessor's. The type used to serve Wrocław's 31, 32, 33 lines almost exclusively, those lines have since been replaced by 12, 18 and 21, which also see other tram models. Skoda 19T now also run on other lines sparsely. The vehicle is designed by Porsche Design Group. The low-floor area represents 65% of the entire vehicle floor. The tram is air-conditioned.

== Production ==
As of 2010, there are going to be 31 trams produced and delivered Wrocław.

The first vehicle was delivered in December 2010 and all of them were in Wrocław by the end of 2011.

== Tramwaj Plus ==
The Tramwaj Plus was a special tram line project which included the use of Škoda 19 T. The vehicles moving along the designated tracks of the line always had the green light on intersections. The line terminated at the Euro 2012 Stadium in Wrocław. Lines 31,32 and 33 no longer run and have been replaced by 12, 18 and 21

There were stewardesses in the tram during the UEFA Euro 2012 Championships, who were instated to assist tourists and fans. There is a seat marked '"i"' designated for a stewardess in each tram.
