= Protram 204 WrAs =

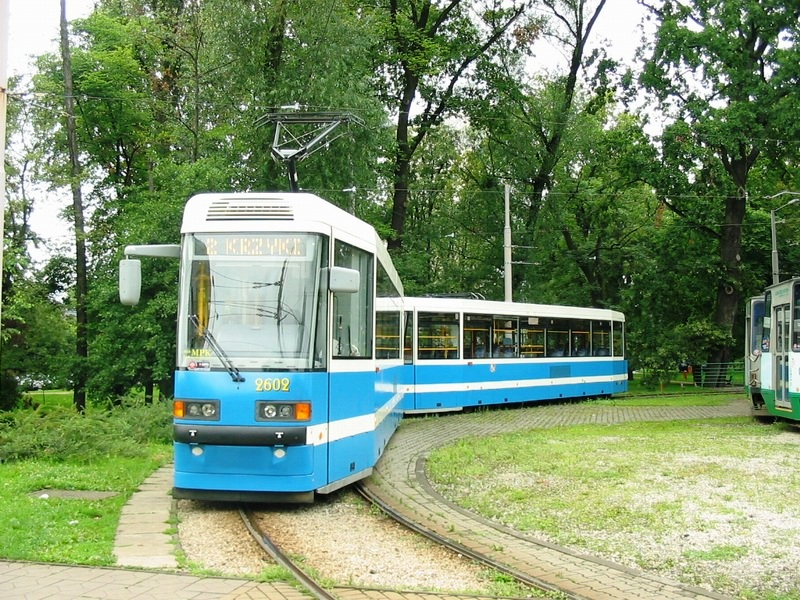
Protram 204 WrAs

The Protram 204 WrAs is a tram produced in between 2004 and 2010 by the Polish company Protram. These trams are similar to the more common Konstal 105Na trams built in Chorzów, however they were produced in significantly smaller numbers, and feature different, newer equipment. They feature air conditioning in the driver's cabin and 4 alternating current motors.

== Use ==
These trams are in use exclusively in Wrocław (thus the "Wr" in the name). They were first delivered to MPK Wrocław in January 2005. Currently there are 12 units in operation, coupled in sets of 2.
