= Protram 205 WrAs =

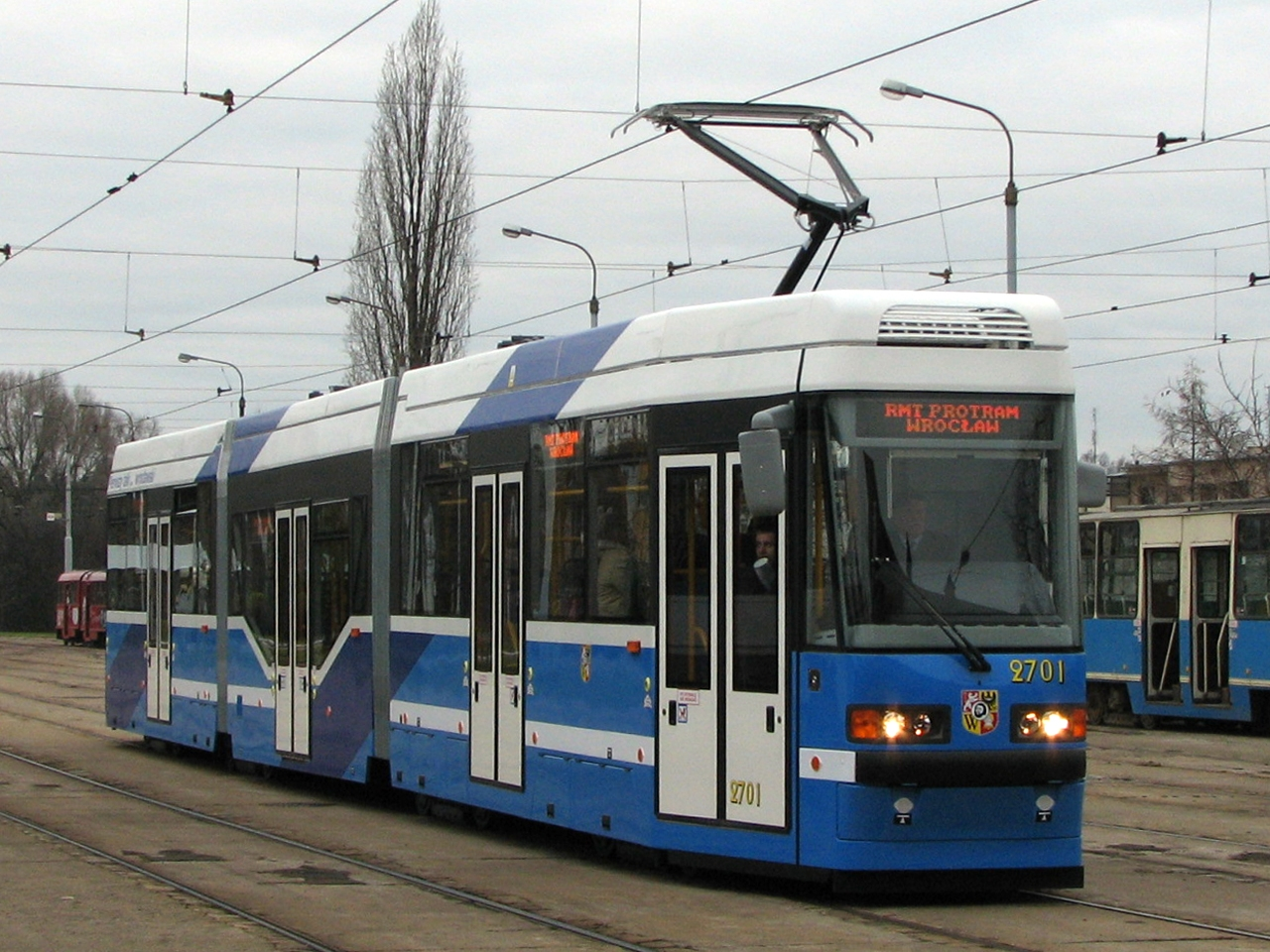
- Protram low floor tram
- Manufacturer: Protram
- Constructed: 2006-2011
- Number built: 26
- Number in service: 26
- Fleet numbers: 2701–2726
- Depots: Wrocław, Poland

Specifications
- Train length: 26.55 m (87 ft 1.3 in)
- Width: 2.36 m (7 ft 8.91 in)
- Height: 3.2 m (10 ft 5.98 in)
- Low-floor: partially
- Articulated sections: 3
- Maximum speed: 60 km/h (37 mph)
- Weight: 35 t (34 long tons; 39 short tons)
- Traction motors: 8 x 50 kW (67 hp)
- Power supply: 400 kW (540 hp)
- Electric system: ? Volt Catenary
- Current collection: Pantograph
- Track gauge: 1435 mm

The Protram 205 WrAs is a Polish partial low-floor, articulated tram produced by the company Protram.

== Utilisation ==
The trams of this type are currently used in Wrocław Poland (thus the "Wr" in the name). The first tram of this type was delivered to MPK Wrocław in December 1978. Currently there are 26 205 WrAs trams in operation.

They were modernised in 2020 by Modertrans Poznań. The modernisation included replacing the body of the tram, electronic components, as well as the changing the flooring, seating, and lighting of the inside of the tram. New passenger information screens were included and air conditioning were also added.

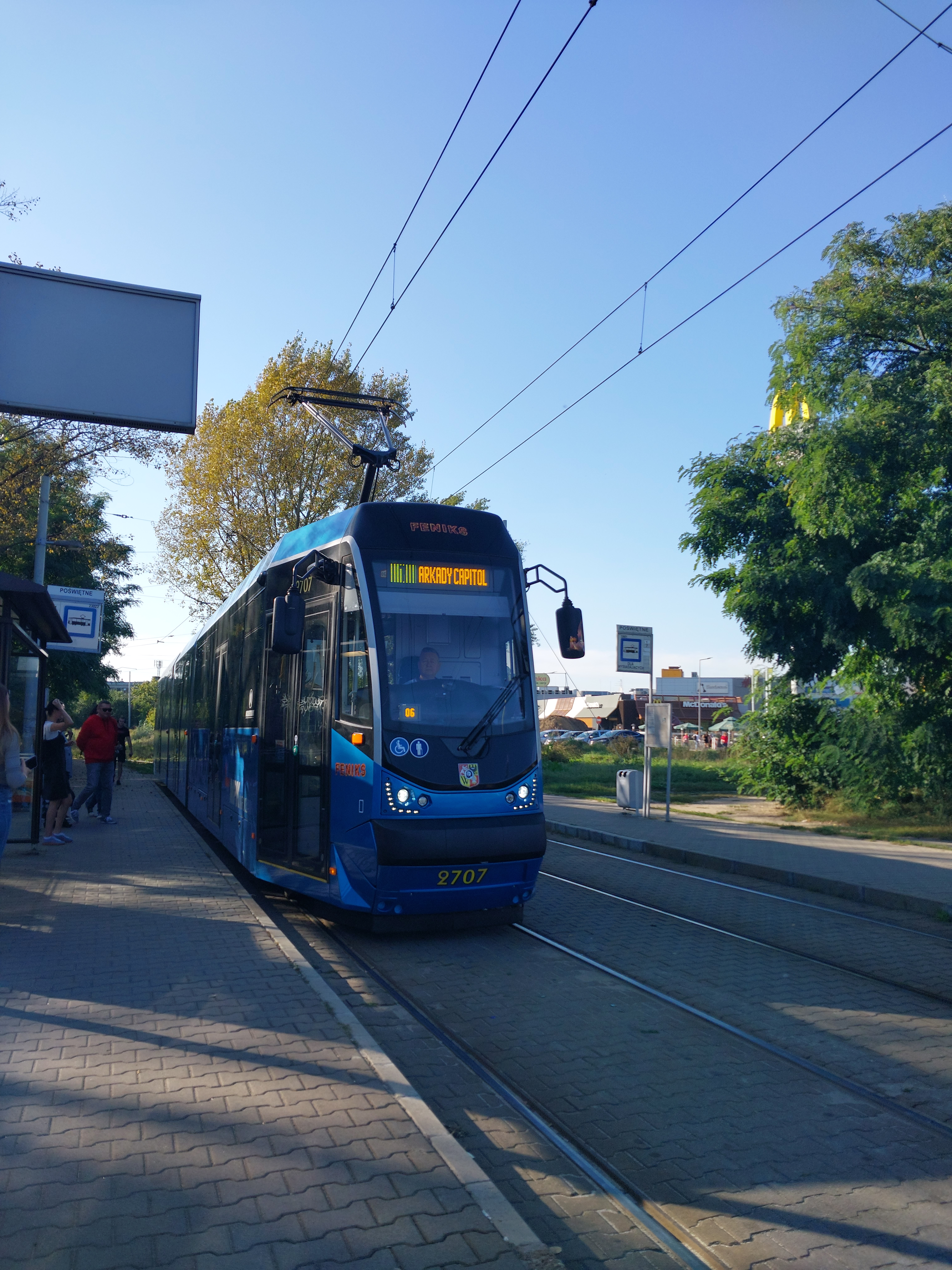
Units after modernisation
