= Trams in Poznań =

Tram system in Poznań, Poland

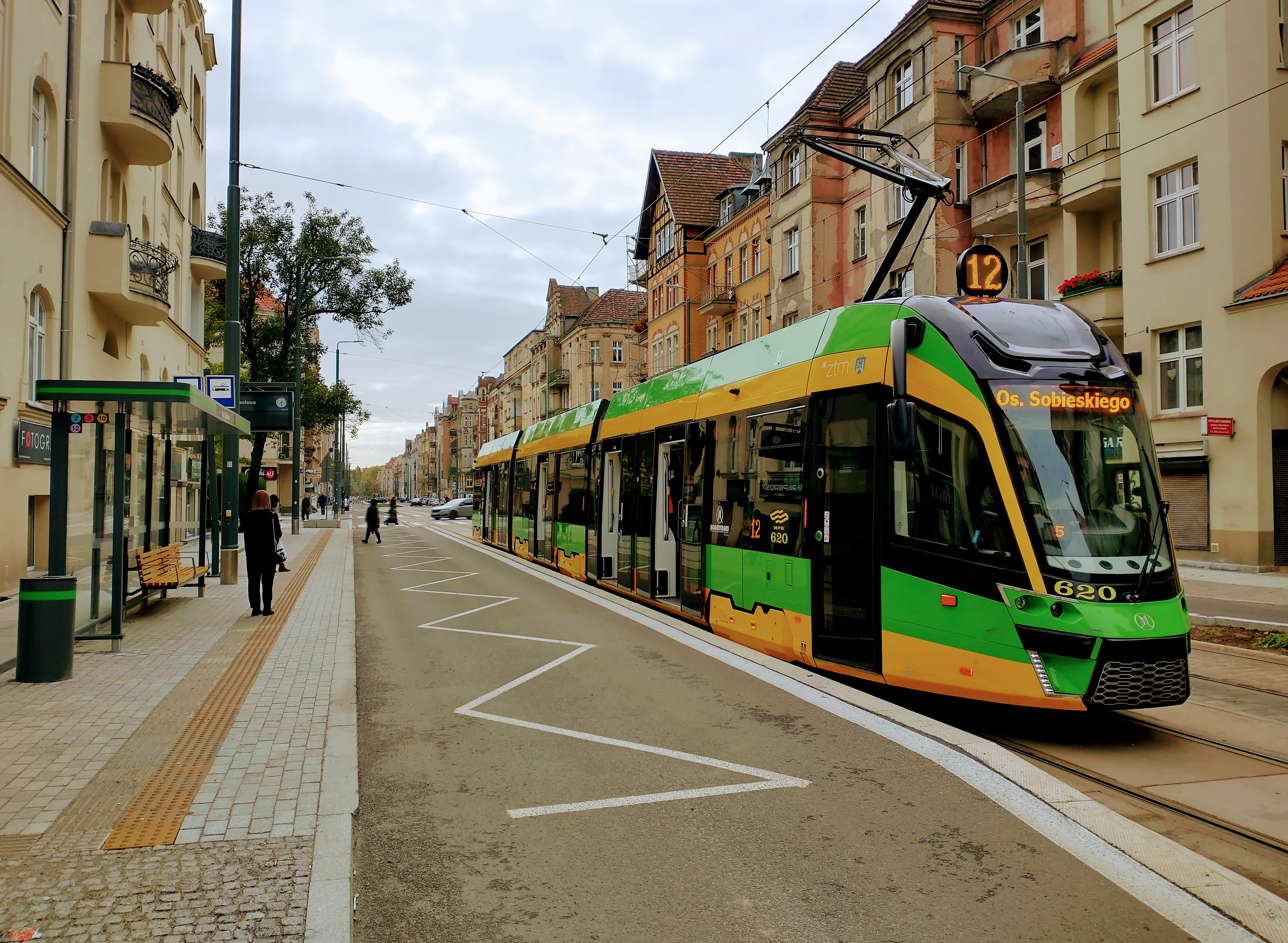
- Tram at Wierzbięcice Street in Poznań

Overview
- Native name: Tramwaje w Poznaniu
- Owner: City of Poznań
- Locale: Poznań, Poland
- Transit type: Tram
- Number of lines: 24: Daytime: 19; Nighttime: 2; Tourist: 3
- Website: www.ztm.poznan.pl/en/ MPK Poznań

Operation
- Began operation: 30 July 1880 (horsecar); 6 March 1898 (electric tram)
- Operator: MPK Poznań
- Number of vehicles: ~430 (81 low-floor)

Technical
- System length: 87 km (54 mi) (2023)
- Track gauge: 1,435 mm (4 ft 8 1/2 in)
System map
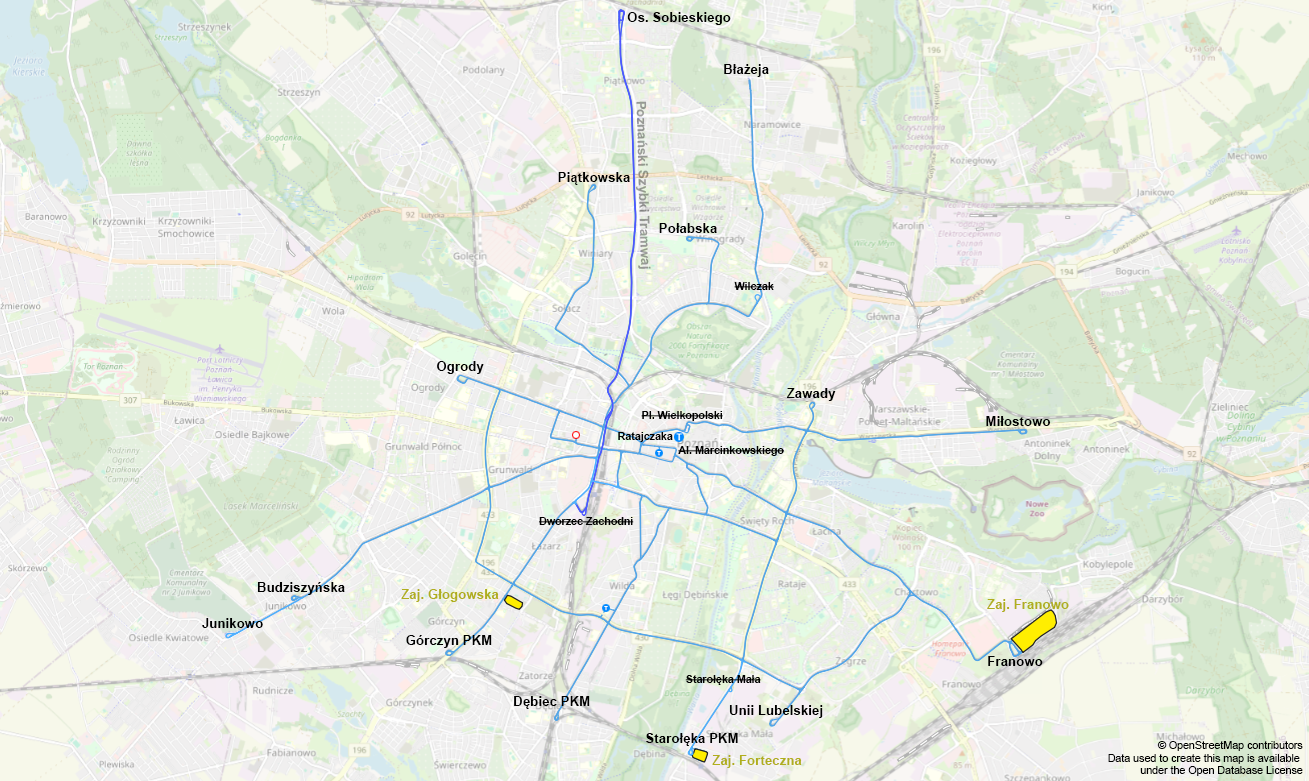
Regular tram tracks
Poznań Fast Tram tracks
Tram depots
T Tram tracks used exclusively for purposes of touristic lines, and their terminus
Tram tracks connected to the network that are no longer in use
abc Active terminal tram stops
~~abc~~ Terminal tram stops used in emergency situations only

The Poznań tram system is a tramway operated by Miejskie Przedsiębiorstwo Komunikacyjne w Poznaniu Sp. z o.o. (MPK Poznań; Public Transport Company in Poznań Ltd.). It currently has 18 daytime lines, 2 night lines, and 3 tourist lines served by historical vehicles. The tram system consists of about 87 kilometres (54 mi) of route, operating on 1,435 mm (4 ft 8 1/2 in) standard gauge track. With a few exceptions the tramlines operate on double tracks rail.

In local Poznań dialect trams are called bimby (pl.), bimba (sing).

== History ==
=== Horse trams (1880–1898) ===
The idea of trams in Poznań was brought to fruition by two businessmen from Berlin: Otto Reymer and Otto Masch. After receiving concessions from the town authorities on 30 July 1880 they began running a horse tram in Poznań. On the next day the first regular line transported passengers from the main train station via ul. Św. Marcin/St. Martin Str., ul. Rycerska/Ritter Str. (today ul. Ratajczaka), Pl. Wilhelmowski/Wilhelms Platz (currently Plac Wolności) to Rynek/Ring (currently Stary Rynek English: Old Market). The route was soon lengthened from Rynek/Ring to ul. Butelska/Büttel Str. (now ul. Woźna), ul. Wielkie Garbary/Grosse Gerber Str. (currently ul. Garbary), Chwaliszewo to Ostrów Tumski. At the same time a branch was built via ul. Wiktorii/Victoria Str. (modern ul. Gwarna and ul. Mielżyńskiego), Plac Królewski/Königs Platz (currently Pl. Cyryla Ratajskiego), ul. Fryderykowska/Friedrich Str. (modern ul. 23 Lutego), Al. Wilhelmowskie/Wilhelms Al. (currently Al. Marcinkowskiego), ul. Seekta/Seekt Str. (modern ul. Solna) and Wolnica, ul. Małe Garbary/Kleine Gerber Str., ul. Szewska, ul. Szeroka/Breite Str. (currently ul. Wielka) to ul. Wielkie Garbary/Grosse Gerber Str. (modern ul. Garbary) where it joined the older route.

Despite the need for modern public transport in the city, after a few weeks the company found itself on the edge of bankruptcy. There were two reasons for this: firstly the branch route had too few passengers, and secondly all the signs in the trams were only in German, leading to a boycott by the Polish majority. The financially troubled company was bought by the Poznań Horse Railway Society (Polish: Poznańskie Towarzystwo Kolei Konnej, German: Posener Pferde-Eisenbahn-Gesellschaft), which obtained a concession and monopoly on tram transportation in the city. At that time there were only 20 cars in service.

In September 1880 the Society bought part of the site of the former train station in Jeżyce/Jersitz suburb, where a tram depot was built (currently it is the oldest tram depot still in service in Poland). In 1896 two new routes were built. The first ran from Rynek/Ring (now Stary Rynek), via ul. Wrocławska/Breslauer Str., Pl. Piotra/Peters Platz (now Pl. Wiosny Ludów), ul. Półwiejska to Brama Wildecka/Wilda Thor. The second went from the tram depot on ul. Gajowa, through ul. Zwierzyniecka/Zoologisher Str., ul. Jadwigi/Hedwigs Str. (modern ul. Kraszewskiego) to Rynek Jeżycki/Jersitz Markt, after one year extended via ul. Wielka Berlińska/Grosse Berliner Str. (modern ul. Dąbrowskiego) to the chemical factory on ul. Polna/Feld Str. Both routes were already built to carry heavier electric cars.

=== Electric trams ===
On 6 March 1898 horse trams were replaced by electric ones. At this time there were three lines:

- white – like the old horse tram from the train station via Rynek/Ring to Ostrów Tumski
- red – from Rynek Jeżycki/Jersitz Markt via ul. Jadwigi/Hedwigs Str., ul. Zwierzyniecka/Zoologischer Str., ul. Św. Marcin/St. Martin Str. and along the old horse tram route to Rynek/Ring and Brama Wildecka/Wilda Thor
- yellow – from the train station like the white line but only as far as the intersection of ul. Szeroka/Breite Str. and ul. Wielkie Garbary/Grosse Gerber Str.

In April a fourth line was added:

- green – from Rynek/Ring via ul. Św. Marcin/St. Martin Str. and the new route on ul. Głogowska/Gloger Str. to Górczyn suburb (today's intersection of ul. Głogowska and ul. Kosynierska).

A ticket cost 10 or 20 pfennigs and after 11 pm the price was doubled.

In 1899 a second track was added to the routes on Rynek/Ring and ul. Wielka Berlińska/Grosse Berliner Str. (modern ul. Dąbrowskiego).

Before World War I the tram network was extended to the Municipal Slaughterhouse on ul. Wielkie Garbary/Grosse Gerber Str., to Plac Sapieżyński/Sapeicha Platz (today Plac Wielkopolski), to Brama Dębińska/Eichwald Thor (currently the intersection of ul. Strzelecka and Krakowska), to Śródka, Sołacz and Dębiec (to the Cegielski Factory). New routes were also built in the centre of the city, including overpasses over the railway tracks: Most Teatralny and Most Dworcowy.

Between the wars new routes were built to Golęcin, Dębiec (extension of existing tracks), Dębina (to the public beach on the bank of the Warta), Ogrody, Grunwald and Winiary. In this same period some routes in the narrow streets of the Old Town were closed. A planned route to Główna was cancelled due to the opening in 1930 of a trolleybus line there.

=== After World War II ===
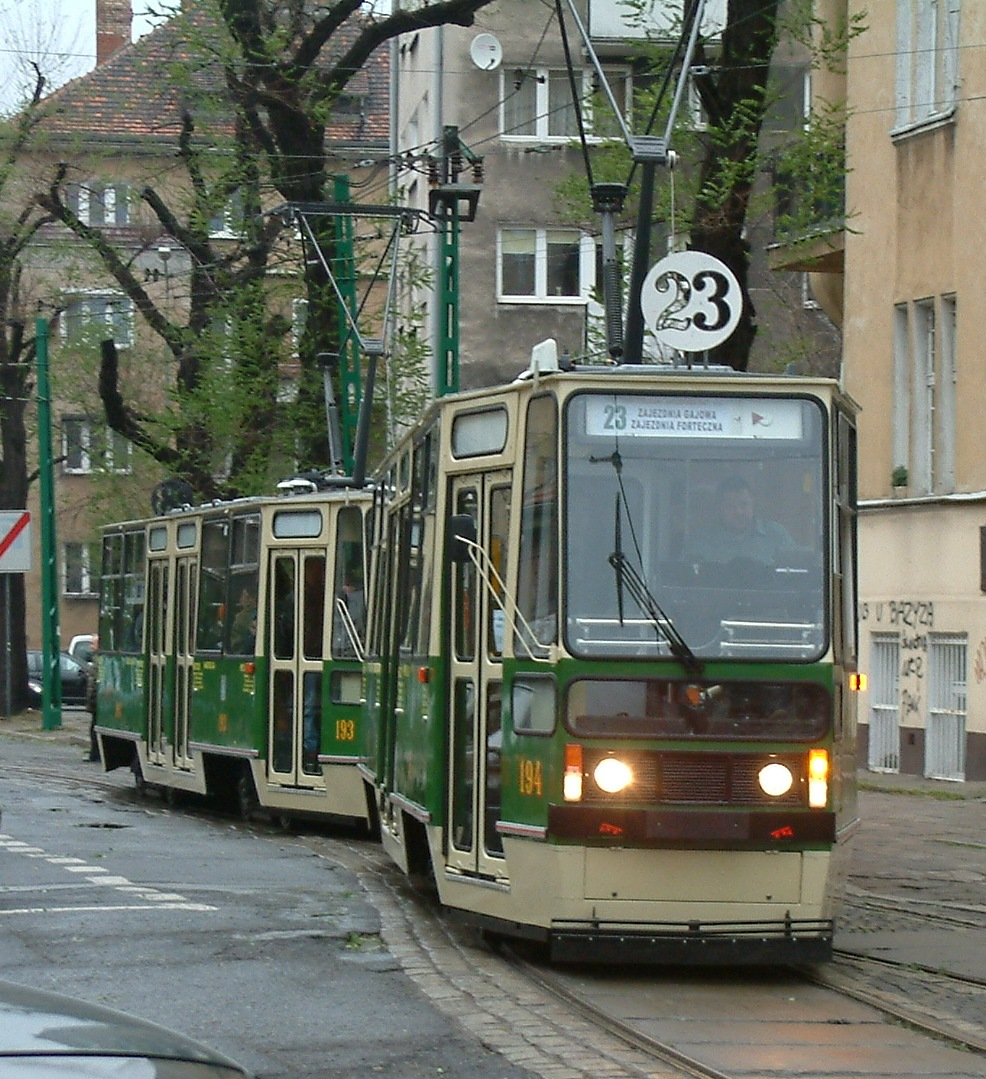
Historical tram, designed 1973.

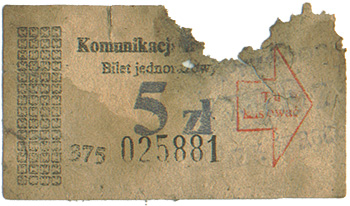
Old ticket (ca. 1986)

During the battle of Poznań in 1945, most of the cars and tracks were destroyed. Tram transportation was partially restored two years after the war, in 1947, though only on the left bank of the Warta. The tracks in the old town were not rebuilt, but a new route was laid via Plac Bernardyński.

Logo of Zarząd Transportu Miejskiego w Poznaniu

The first post-war tram on the right bank appeared in 1952, when the new Marchlewski Bridge was opened (now called Most Królowej Jadwigi).

In the following years new routes connecting different districts and bypassing the centre of city were built:

- 1955–1957 via ul. Marchlewskiego (now ul. Królowej Jadwigi)
- 1968–1973 via ul. Przybyszewskiego, ul. Reymonta and ul. Hetmańska
- 1974–1977 from Plac Wielkopolski via ul. Małe Garbary, ul. Estkowskiego to Rondo Śródka.
- 1983–1985 from os. Lecha via ul. Jedności Słowiańskiej (today Chartowo and Żegrze) to ul. Hetmańska

Also some lines to peripheral districts were built:

- 1949–1950 to the communal cemetery in Junikowo
- 1957–1964 via ul. Pułaskiego and ul. Winogrady to ul. Wilczak (a branch to ul. Serbska was added in 1974)
- 1955 from Rataje to the Stomil Factory in Starołęka, in 1967 extended to 'Poznań Starołęka' train station
- 1959 to Zawady via Śródka with a branch to os. Warszawskie, extended in 1974 to Miłostowo
- 1979 to Chartowo and Osiedle Lecha
- 1980 to Winiary and ul. Piątkowska

A revolution for public transport in Poznań was brought about by the opening in 1997 of the 6.1 km long Poznański Szybki Tramwaj (English: Poznań Fast Tram) route, nicknamed "Pestka" by locals. Currently there are several plans for extension of the network, at different stages of preparation. Of great importance for tram transportation in Poznań was the general strategy for city development from 1994. According to this document trams are to serve as the fundamental mode of transport in the city. Since then, during renovations of streets and traffic lights, trams have been given right of way at intersections.

On 14 August 2007 a long new route opened, as the first section of the so-called Ratajski Szybki Tramwaj (English: Rataje Fast Tram). The new route connects Plac Wiosny Ludów via ul. Podgórna, ul. Dowbora Muśnickiego, ul. Mostowa, Most św. Rocha and ul. Kórnicka to ul. Jana Pawła II.

In 2011, MPK decided to sell 40 type 105Na trams due to lack of space in the depots for this type of trams. In addition, 45 Solaris Tramino trams were ordered along with 7 Moderus Beta trams.

On 11 August 2012 the final section of the route to Franowo opened, connecting the area of the former terminus loop at os. Lech with a new loop in Franowo. Part of the route runs through the 800m Franowo tunnel. At Franowo there is also a large, modern depot.

On 1 September 2013 an extension of the PST route was opened which runs parallel to the railway line between Poznan Główny station and Głogowska. This uses space that became available from the former platform 7 at the station.

== Rolling stock ==
Image	Type	Number	Builder	Built	Fleet numbers	Description
	Tatra RT6N1	16	Tatra	1997	399–414	Modernised 2012–2016, trams no. 399 and 400 were purchased and modernised in 2021
	Siemens Combino	14	Siemens	2003	501–514	Modernised 2022–2024
	Moderus Alfa 105N-HF07	36	Modertrans Poznań	2008–2010	83–337	Trams rebuilt from former Konstal 105Na trams
	Moderus Beta MF 02 AC	24	Modertrans Poznań	2011–2015	415–438	Tram #438 was rebuilt after a major accident and repurposed for a training tram In 2025, the modernization of the wagons was begun
	Solaris Tramino	46	Solaris Bus & Coach	2011–2012	515–559, 560	560 (ex. 451) was the prototype tram and wears a different red and white livery
	Moderus Beta MF 20 AC	20	Modertrans Poznań	2016–2017	441–460	
	Moderus Beta MF 22 AC BD	10	Modertrans Poznań	2016–2017	911–920	
	Moderus Gamma LF02AC	30	Modertrans Poznań	2018–2019	601–630	Trams built from scratch in Modertrans Poznań factory based in Biskupice, Poznań County
	Moderus Gamma LF 03 AC BD	20	Modertrans Poznań	2019	921–940	
	Moderus Gamma LF 04 AC BD	30	Modertrans Poznań	2025	941–970	
	Duewag R1.1	24	Duewag / Siemens	1994	971-994	Purchased from Bonn

Historical vehicles:

- horse car Herbrand B3/H0 No. 24 built in 1880 (several times rebuilt)
- BSI motor car No. 15 with Carl Weyer trailer No. 305 (replicas from a remaining chassis and a car body, originally built in 1897)
- Fuchs KSW No. 158 with Wismar S2D trailer No. 423 (originally built for Szczecin in 1930)
- Stocznia Północna N No. 178 with Sanok ND trailer No. 436
- Konstal N No. 286 with trailer Konstal ND No. 456 (refitted in uni-directional version)
- Konstal 13N No. 115 (ex Warsaw, to be restored)
- Konstal 102N No. 1
- Konstal 102Na No. 71
- Konstal 105N No. 82 + 81
- Konstal 105Na No. 260 + 259 + 258
- Beijnes 3G No. 610 (ex Amsterdam)
- Duewag GT8 No. 702 and 707 (ex Düsseldorf)
- Duewag GT6 No. 2513 (ex Düsseldorf)
- Duewag GT8 No. 904 (bidirectional type "O", ex Frankfurt)
- HCP Puma 118N (withdrawn and given back to H. Cegielski – Poznań at the end of 2012, since 2025 at the association KMPS)

Retired cars:

- HCP 115N (scrapped in August 2011)

== Tram lines ==
Poznań has 18 regular lines as well as 3 night lines and 2 tourist line. Most lines run trams every 10 minutes on weekdays and every 20 minutes on weekends.

Daily	all day	1, 2, 3, 4, 5, 6, 7, 8, 9, 10, 11, 12, 13, 14, 15, 16, 17, 18
Tourist	weekends	0, 20
Tourist	on selected days (announced separately)	H
Nightly	daily	201, 202

Route no.	Route
Daytime routes
	JUNIKOWO – Grunwaldzka – Rondo Nowaka-Jeziorańskiego – Reymonta – Hetmańska – Rondo Starołęka – Hetmańska – Rondo Żegrze – Żegrze – Chartowo – Piaśnicka – FRANOWO
	DĘBIEC PKM – 28 Czerwca 1956 r. – Wierzbięcice – Matyi – Towarowa – Święty Marcin – Zwierzyniecka – Kraszewskiego – Dąbrowskiego – OGRODY
	UNII LUBELSKIEJ - Żegrze - Chartowo - Trasa Kórnicka - Warczygłowy - Kórnicka - Mostowa - Pl. Bernardyński - Podgórna - Aleje Marcinkowskiego - 27 Grudnia - Fredry – Roosevelta – Pułaskiego – Winogrady – Przełajowa – Naramowicka – al. Praw Kobiet – BŁAŻEJA
	POŁABSKA - Murawa - Winogrady - Puławskiego - Fredry - Pl. Ratajskiego - Pl. Wielkopolski - Małe Garbary - MAŁE GARBARY
	GÓRCZYN PKM – Matyi – Towarowa – Święty Marcin – Aleje Marcinkowskiego – Podgórna – pl. Bernardyński – Mostowa – Kórnicka – Jana Pawła II – Podwale – ZAWADY
	MIŁOSTOWO – Warszawska – Jana Pawła II – Krzywoustego – Królowej Jadwigi Górna Wilda - Wierzbięcice – Matyi – Roosevelta – Bukowska – Grunwaldzka – BUDZISZYŃSKA
	MIŁOSTOWO - Warszawska – Jana Pawła II – Zamenhofa – Hetmańska – Reymonta – Przybyszewskiego – Dąbrowskiego – OGRODY
	OGRODY – Dąbrowskiego – Fredry – Gwarna - Święty Marcin - Aleje Marcinkowskiego - Podgórna - Pl. Bernardyński - Mostowa - Kórnicka - Jana Pawła II – Warszawska – MIŁOSTOWO
	DĘBIEC PKM – 28 Czerwca 1956 r. – Górna Wilda – Królowej Jadwigi – Strzelecka – Aleje Marcinkowskiego – pl. Wolności – Fredry – Roosevelta – Pułaskiego – al. Wielkopolska – Małopolska – Wołyńska – Winiarska – os. Winiary – Witosa – Bronowa – PIĄTKOWSKA
	BŁAŻEJA – Praw Kobiet – Naramowicka – Przełajowa – Winogrady – Pułaskiego – Roosevelta – Rondo Kaponiera – Roosevelta – Most Dworcowy – Wierzbięcice – 28 Czerwca 1956 r. – DĘBIEC
	PIĄTKOWSKA – Winiarska – Wołyńska – Małopolska – Al. Wielkopolska – Pułaskiego – Roosevelta – Rondo Kaponiera – Roosevelta – Głogowska – Hetmańska – Rondo Starołęka – Hetmańska – Rondo Żegrze – Unii Lubelskiej – UNII LUBELSKIEJ
	OS. SOBIESKIEGO – Głogowska – Matyi – Wierzbięcice - Górna Wilda - Królowej Jadwigi – Krzywoustego – Zamenhofa – Starołęcka – STAROŁĘKA PKM
	STAROŁĘKA PKM – Zamenhofa – Jana Pawła II – Kórnicka – Mostowa – pl. Bernardyński – Podgórna – Aleje Marcinkowskiego – pl. Wolności – Gwarna – Święty Marcin – Bukowska – Grunwaldzka – JUNIKOWO
	GÓRCZYN PKM – Głogowska – Trasa PST – OS. SOBIESKIEGO
	OS. SOBIESKIEGO – Trasa PST – Roosevelta – Bukowska – Grunwaldzka – JUNIKOWO
	OS. SOBIESKIEGO – Trasa PST – Fredry – Gwarna – Święty Marcin – Aleje Marcinkowskiego – Podgórna – pl. Bernardyński – Mostowa – Kórnicka – Warczygłowy – Trasa Kórnicka – Piaśnicka – Szwajcarska – FRANOWO
	GÓRCZYN PKM – Matyi – Towarowa – Święty Marcin – Gwarna – pl. Ratajskiego – pl. Wielkopolski – Małe Garbary – MAŁE GARBARY
	OGRODY – Dąbrowskiego – Roosevelta – Rondo Kaponiera – Roosevelta – Matyi – Wierzbięcice - Górna Wilda - Królowej Jadwigi – Krzywoustego – Rondo Rataje – Jana Pawła II - Warczygłowy - Trasa Kórnicka – Piaśnicka – FRANOWO
Nighttime routes
	UNII LUBELSKIEJ – Unii Lubelskiej – Żegrze – Chartowo – Trasa Kórnicka – Warczygłowy – Kórnicka – Mostowa – pl. Bernardyński – Podgórna – Aleje Marcinkowskiego – pl. Wolności – Gwarna – Święty Marcin – Roosevelta – Głogowska – Trasa PST – OS. SOBIESKIEGO
	FRANOWO – Szwajcarska – Piaśnicka – Trasa Kórnicka – Warczygłowy – Kórnicka – Mostowa – pl. Bernardyński – Podgórna – Aleje Marcinkowskiego – pl. Wolności – Fredry – Roosevelta – Trasa PST – OS. SOBIESKIEGO
Tourist route
	GAJOWA – Zwierzyniecka – Kraszewskiego – Dąbrowskiego – Roosevelta – Rondo Kaponiera – Roosevelta – Matyi – Wierzbięcice – 28 Czerwca – ZAJEZDNIA MADALIŃSKIEGO – Hetmańska – Głogowska – Roosevelta – Rondo Kaponiera – Zwierzyniecka – GAJOWA Operates on weekends between 29 April and 14 October.

== Depots ==
- ul Głogowska depot

This is the second largest tram depot in Poznan (after Franowo). It was built in 1907 and underwent modernisation between 1998 and 2000 in preparation for low floor trams. It is close to the tram stop Krauthofera.

- Starołęka

This depot opened in 1980 at the Starołęka terminus. The construction began in 1974

- Franowo

This is the largest and newest depot in Poznan, opened on 11 May 2014. The depot has space for 100 trams.

The following depots have now closed:

- ul. Gajowa. This depot opened in 1880 and closed on 28 December 2010. (Reason: Sold in 2008, Because the Portuguese Investor Was Demanding Too Much Money From The Operator To Use The Depot)
- Budziszyńska. This was an overflow depot for ul. Głogowska and Madalińskiego. The depot closed on 4 November 2012. (Opened in 1985. Construction Began in 1982, To solve the issue of the lack of space of the 60s, 70s, and 80s. the reason was the trams that were At Bolesława Krzywoustego, Zwierzyniecka, Rondo Rataje, Przybyszewskiego and Towarowa were Vandalised
- ul Madalińskiego. This depot was built between 1947 and 1955 and closed on 14 December 2014. It was the smallest depot MPK operated. It is now used for the historical fleet.
- ul. Bolesława Krzywoustego. This depot was used in the 1980s and was located between Rondo Rataje and ul. Pleszewskiej.

== Plans for further extension ==
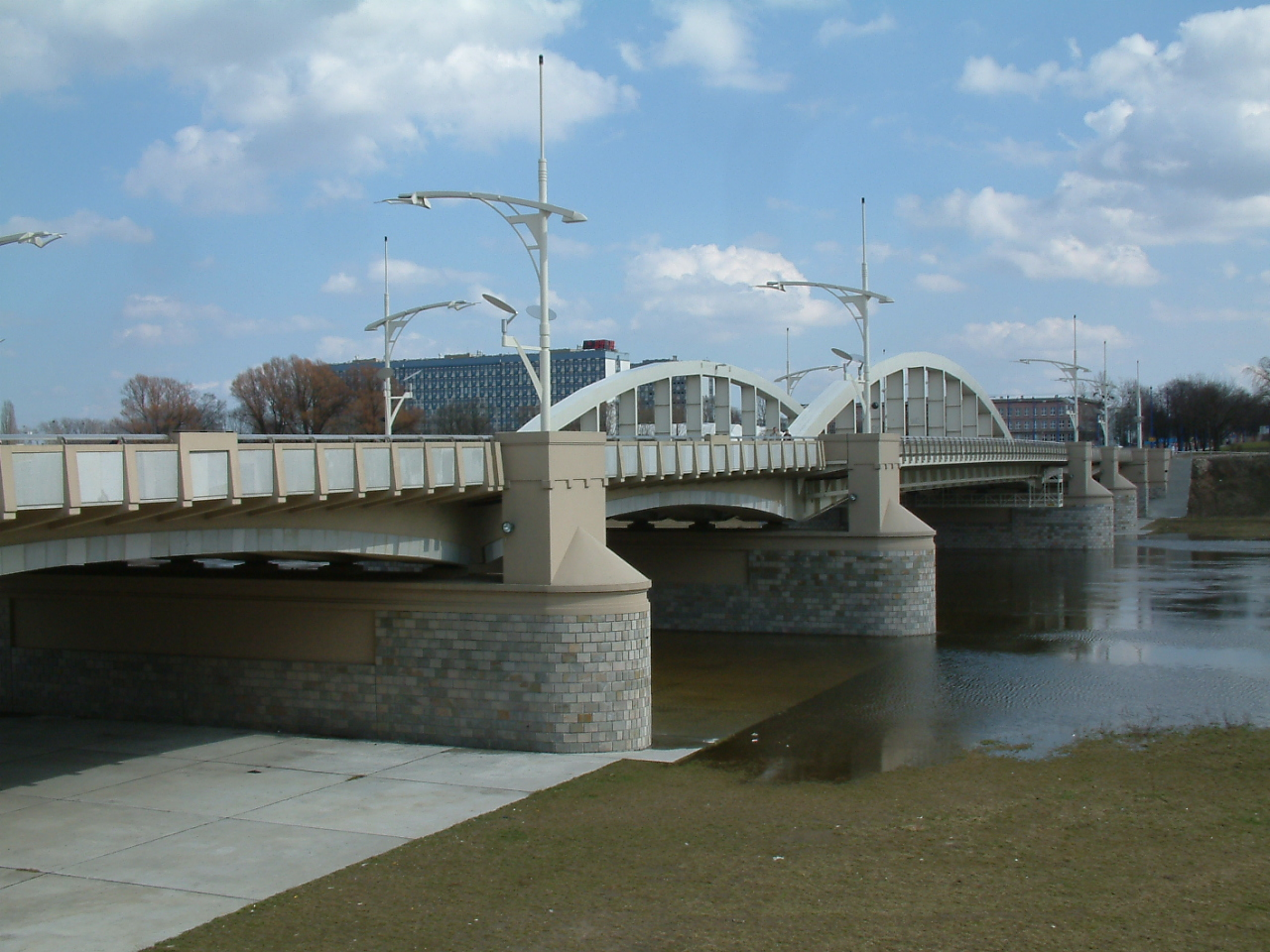
St. Roch Bridge – part of the newest route opened on 14 August 2007, part of the planned Ratajski Szybki Tramwaj

Currently in Poznań there are several plans to extend the tram network; some of them are only planned, others are under construction:

- extension of the line from Ogrody along ul. Dąbrowskiego to al. Polska with new tram/bus station at the end of the route
- extension of route from Zawady alongside ul. Zawady and ul. Główna to Poznań Wschód station
- extension of route from Dębiec via ul. 28. Czerwca 1956 r. to os. Dębina
- new route via ul. Ratajczaka, Pl. Cyryla Ratajskiego, ul. Solna and ul. Nowowiejskiego
- new route to os. Kopernika alongside ul. Arciszewskiego and ul. Pogodna and new route on ul. Szpitalna and ul. Grochowska
- new route from ul. Garbary through ul. Szelągowska and ul. Naramowicka to Naramowice connected with existing line to ul. Wilczak
- new route from already existing Naramowice branch of the tram network at ul. Nowa Naramowicka alongside ul. Łużycka and ul. Sielawy to Rubież, terminating at Poznan Science and Technology Park.

== Gallery ==
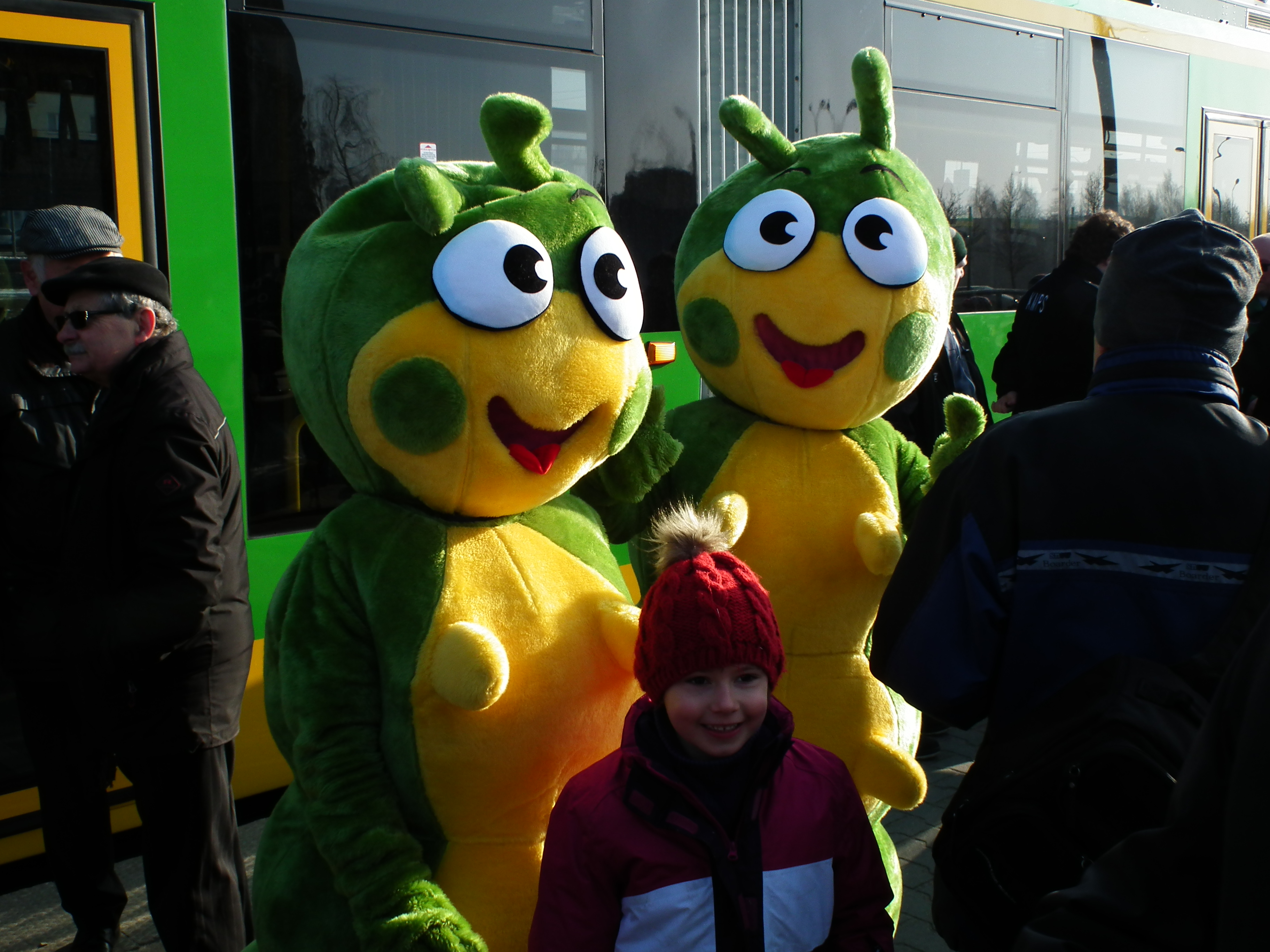
MPK mascots, Bimbolas

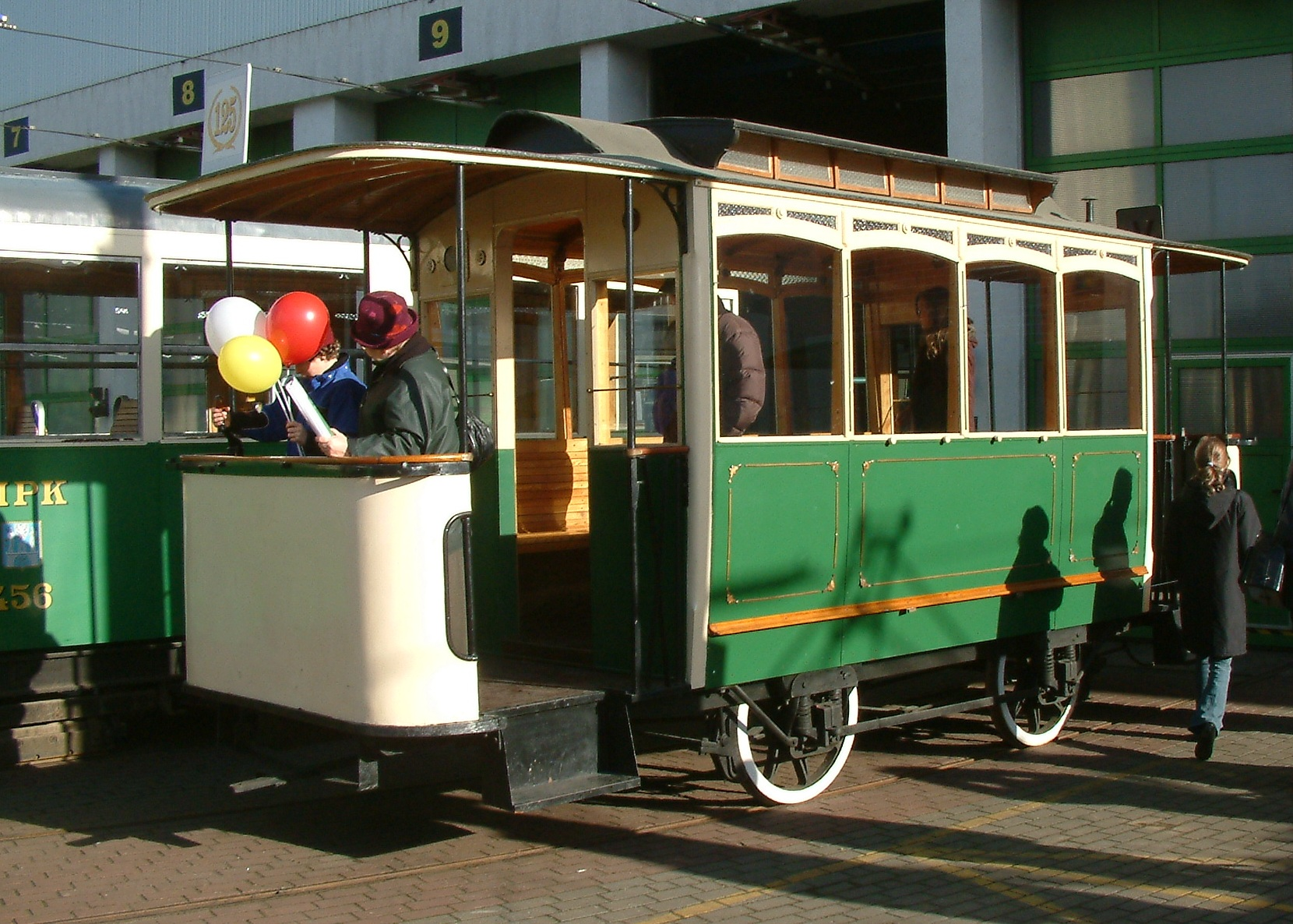
Herbrand B3/H0 Horse tram

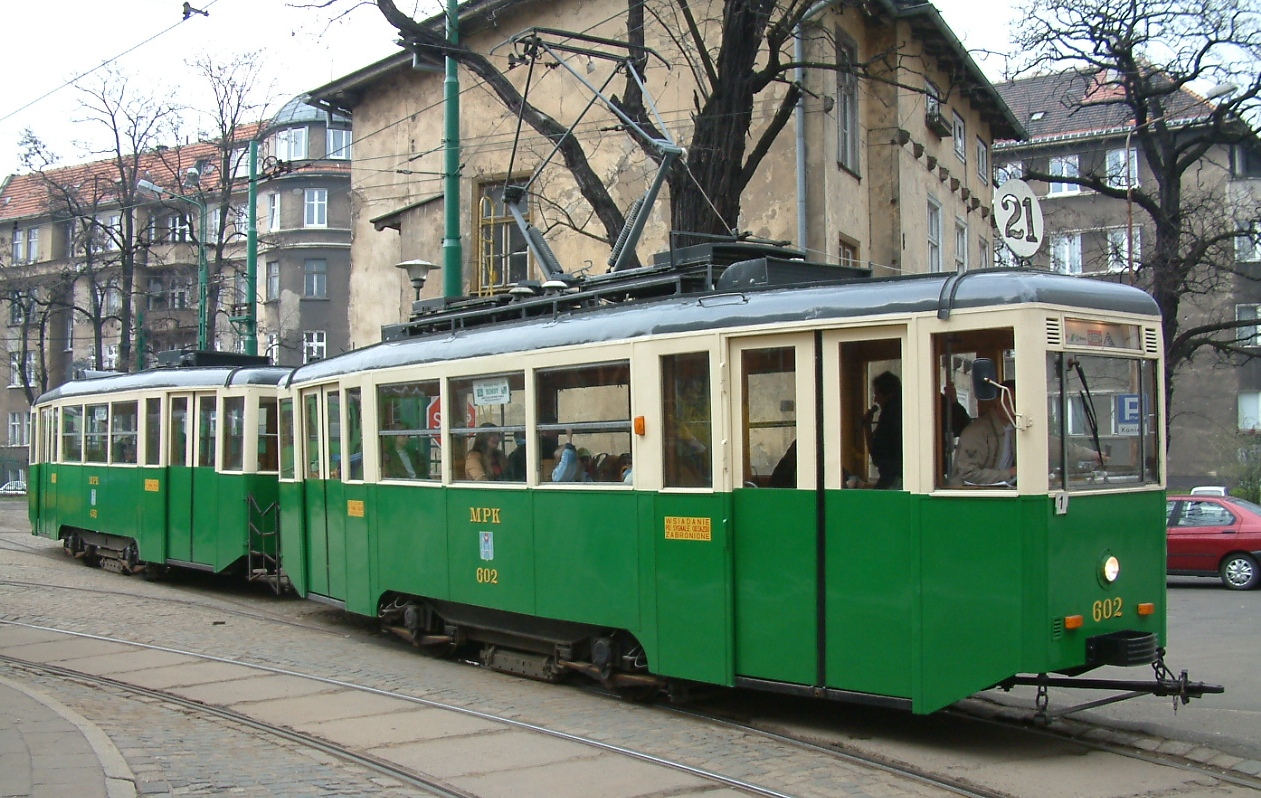
Historic Konstal 4N+4ND

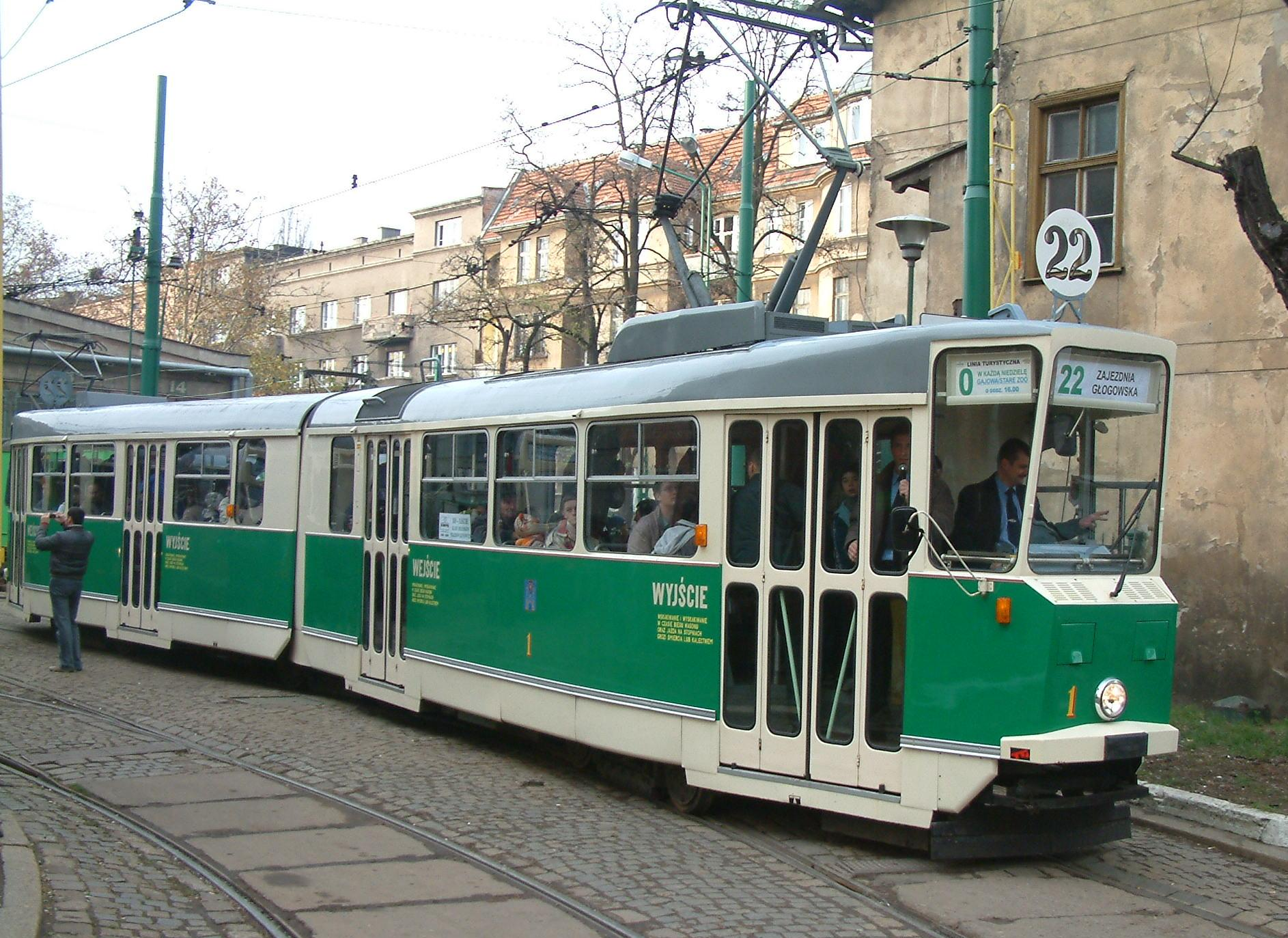
Historic Konstal 102N

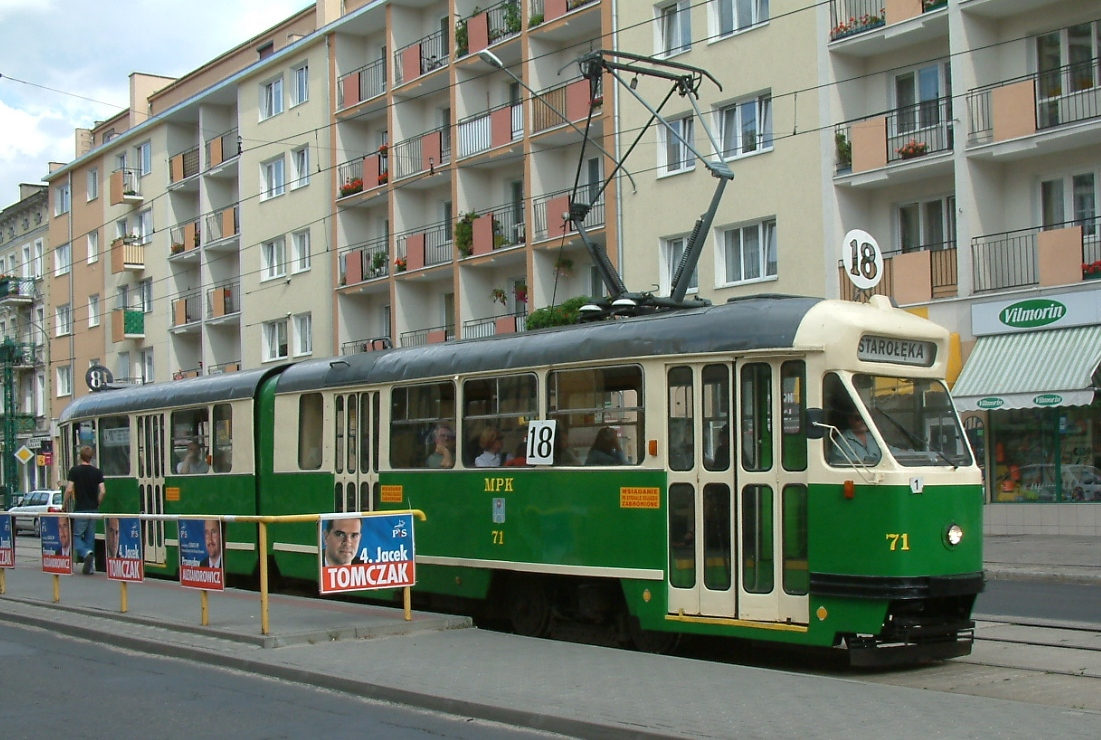
Historic Konstal 102Na

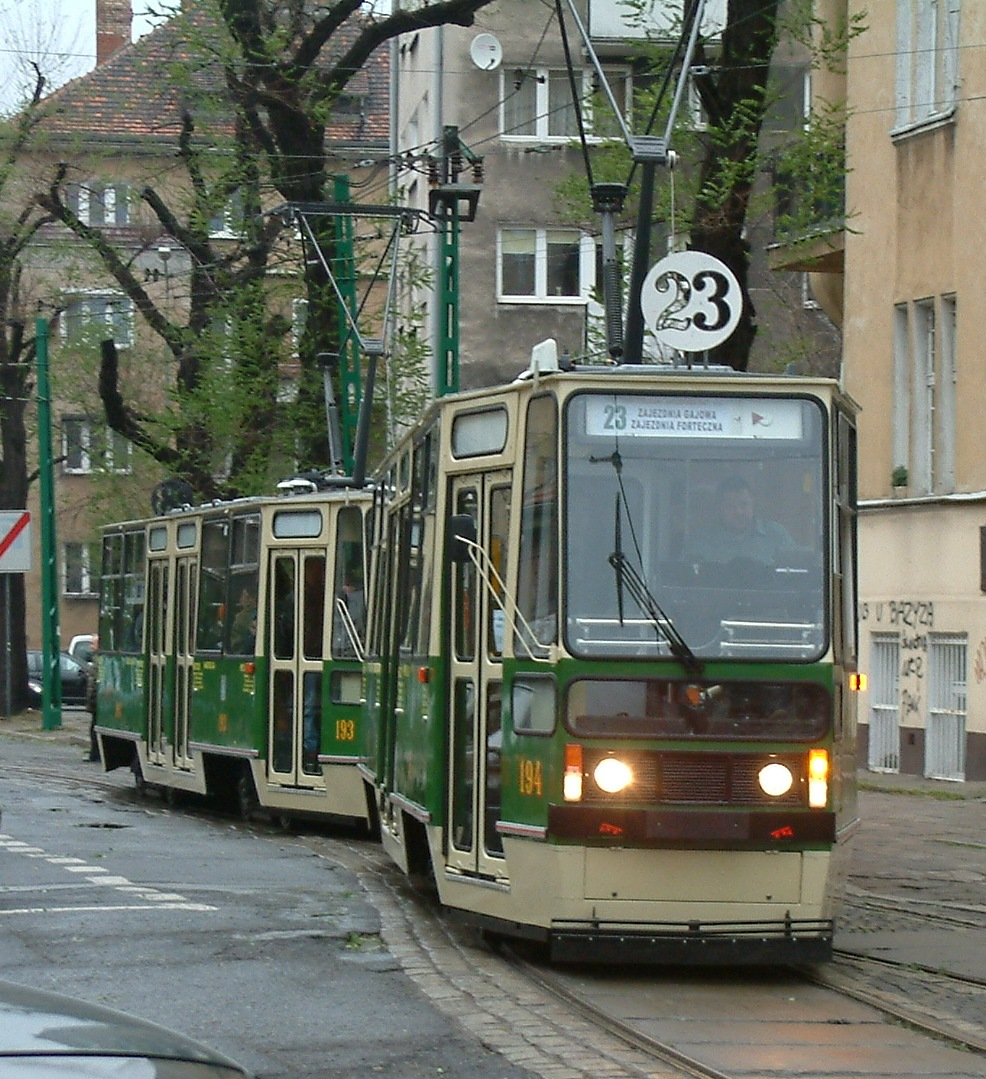
Historic Konstal 105N

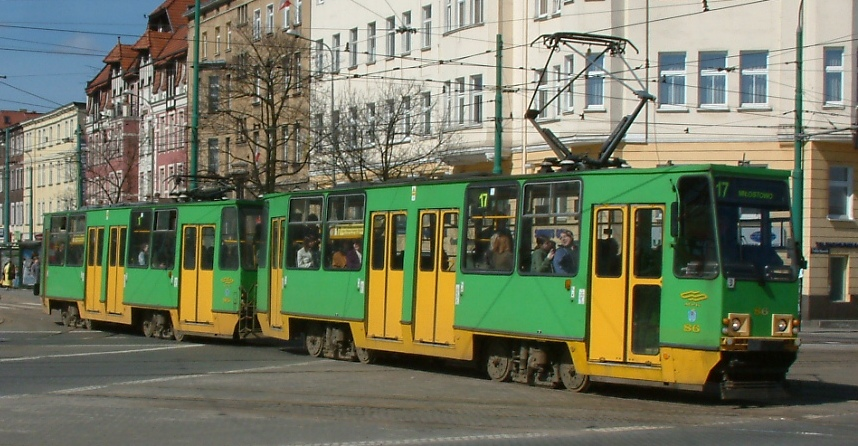
Konstal 105Na+105NaD

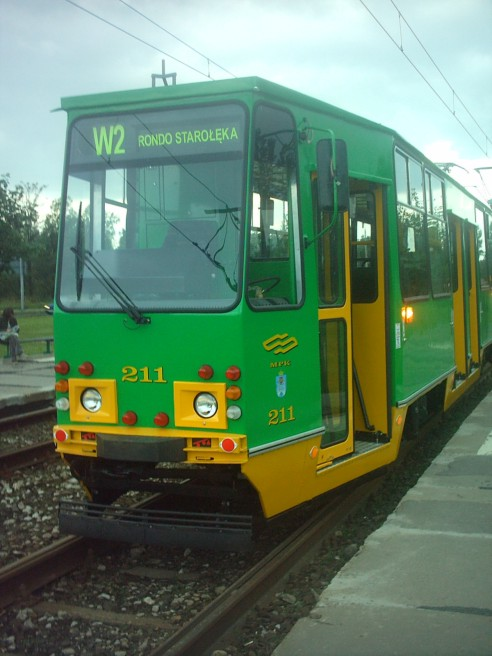
Konstal 105NaDK

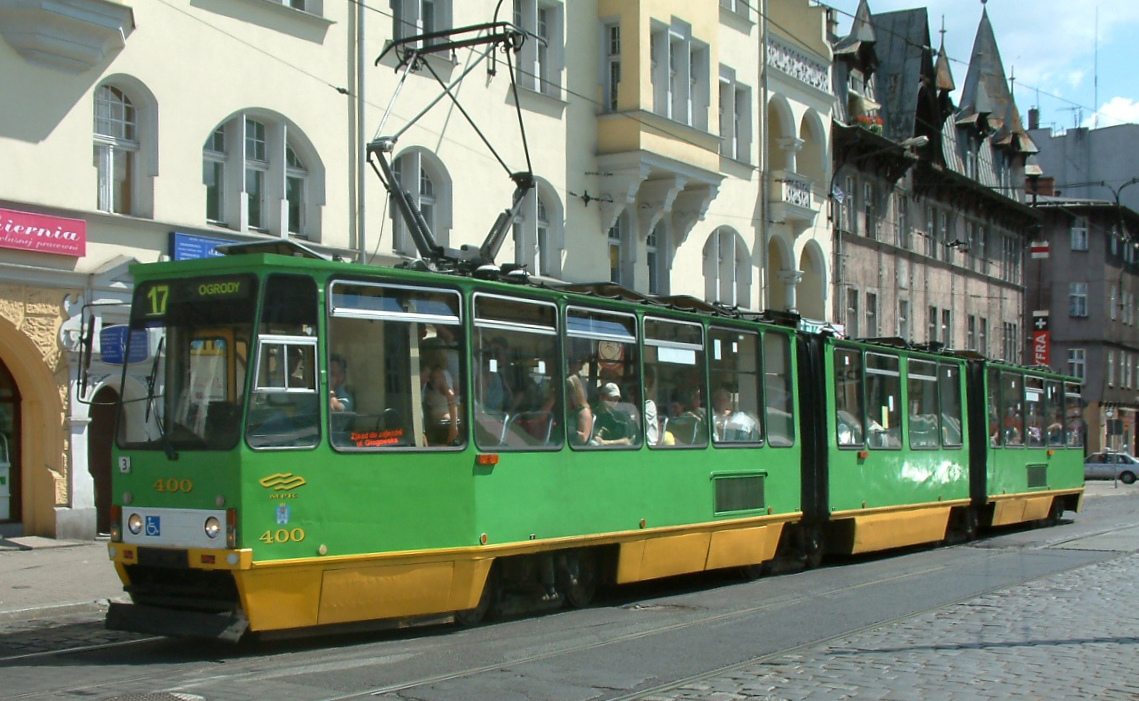
Konstal/HCP 105N2 (115N)

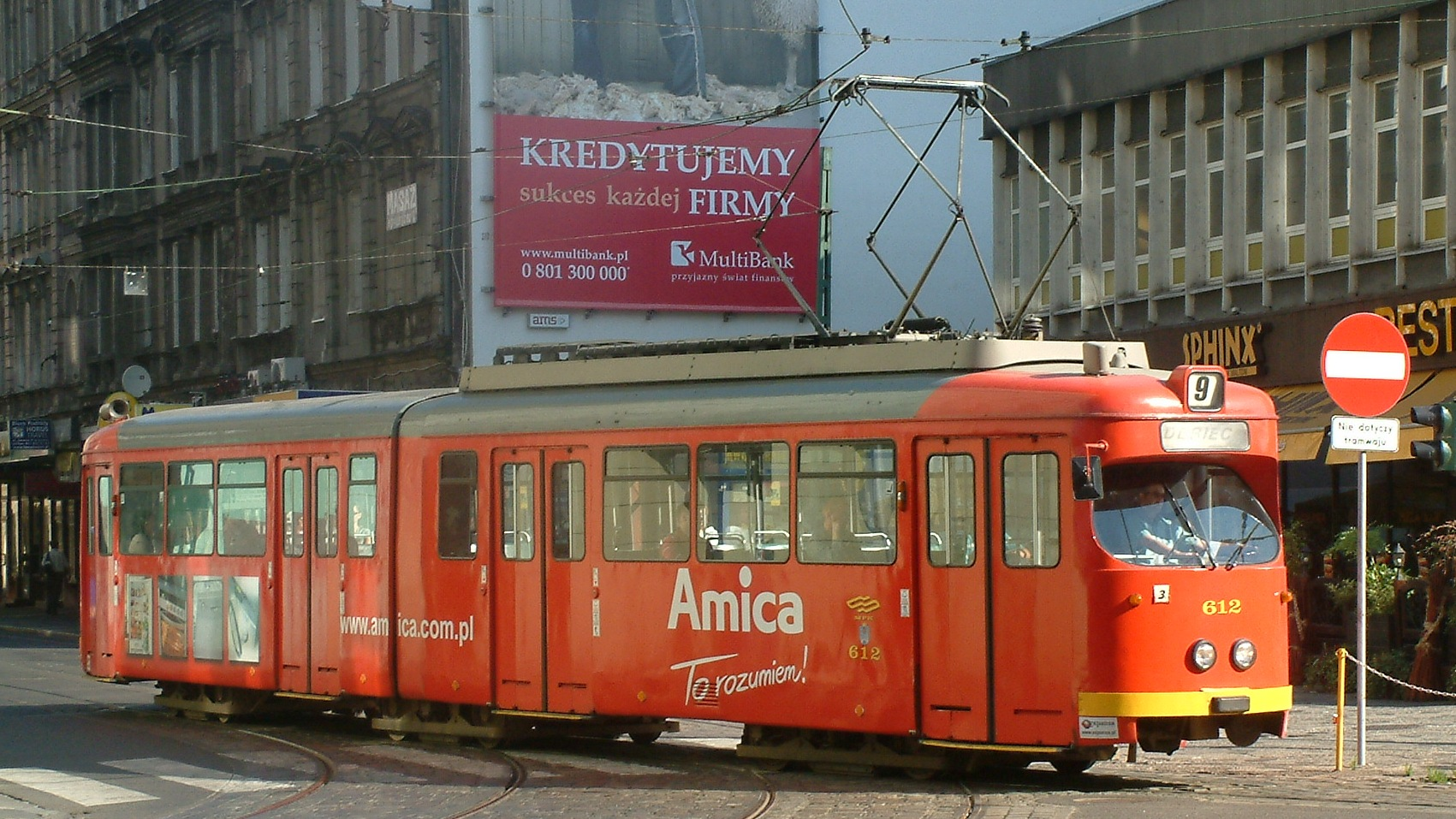
Düwag GT6

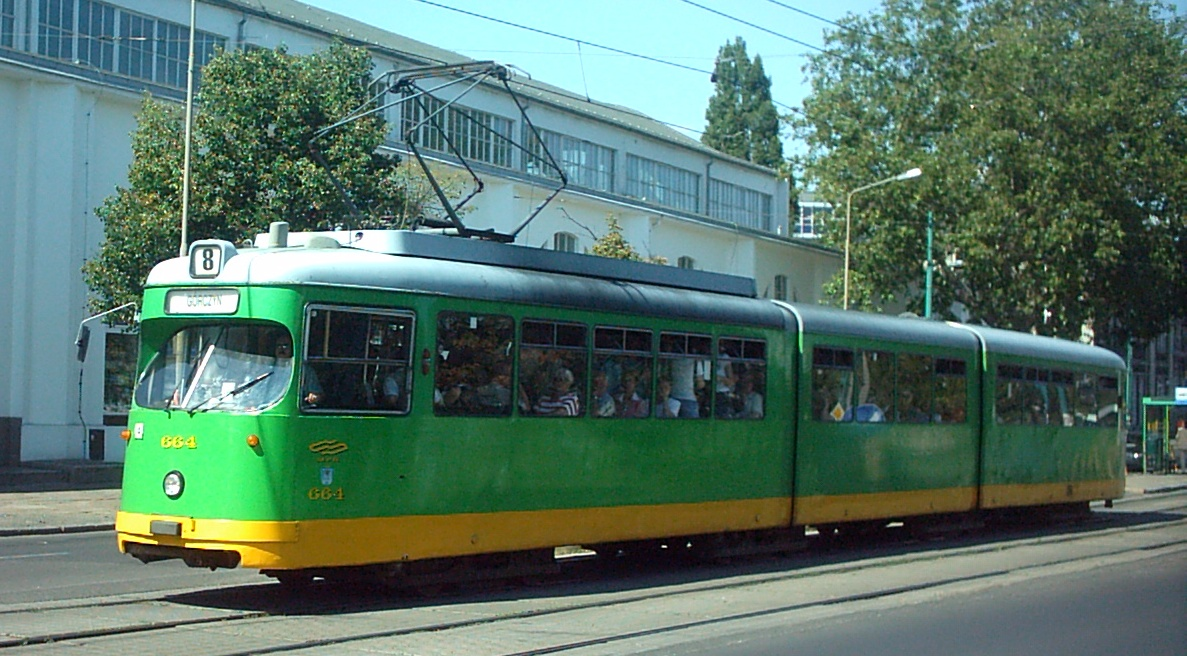
Düwag GT8

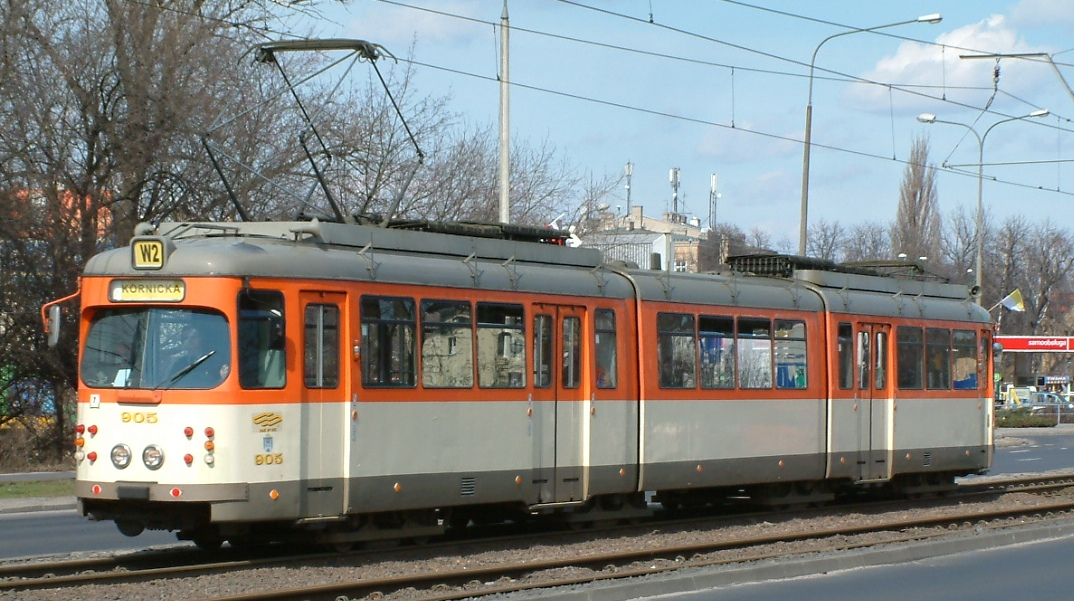
Düwag GT-8ZR

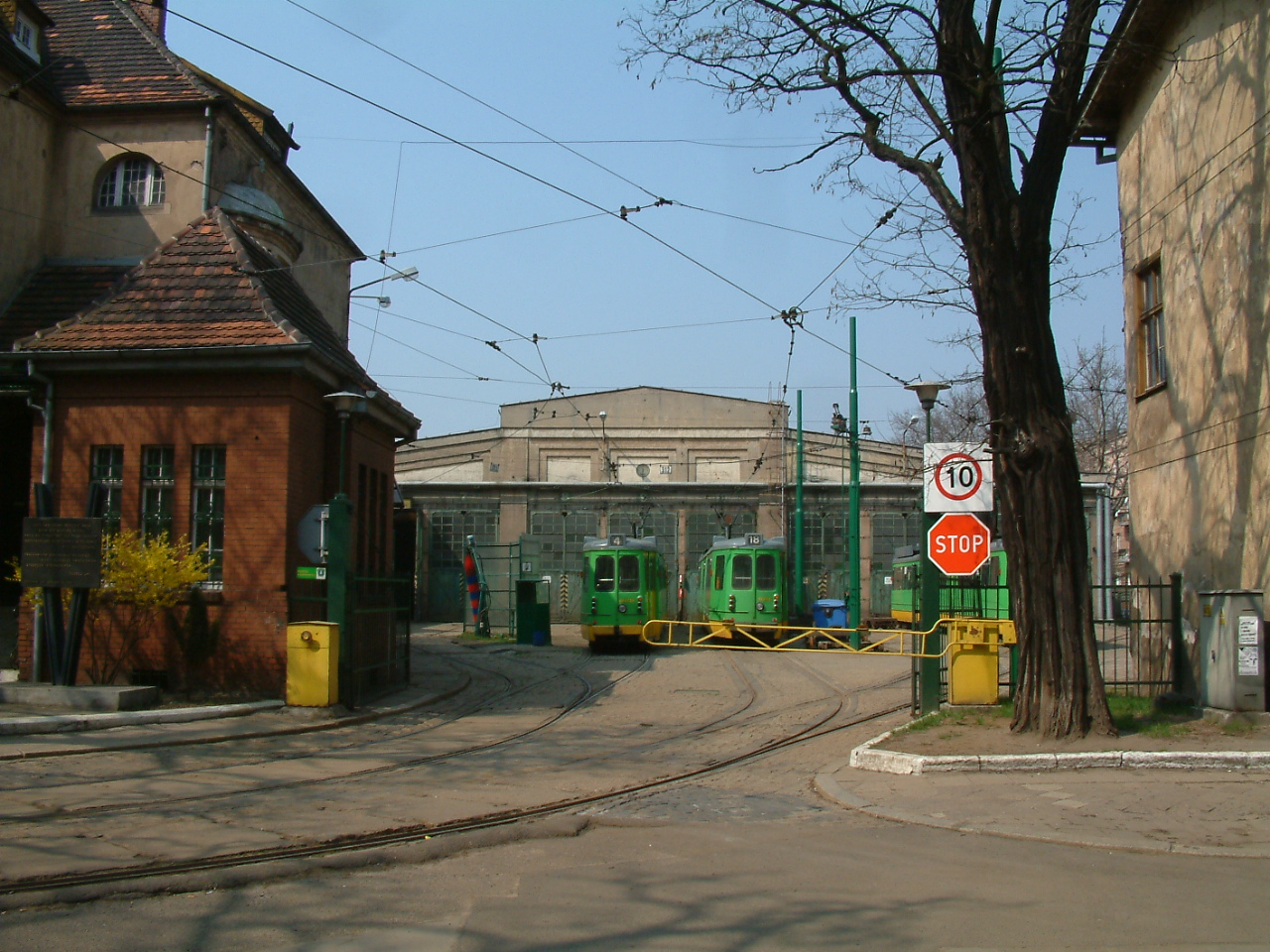
Historical tram depot on Gajowa Str.

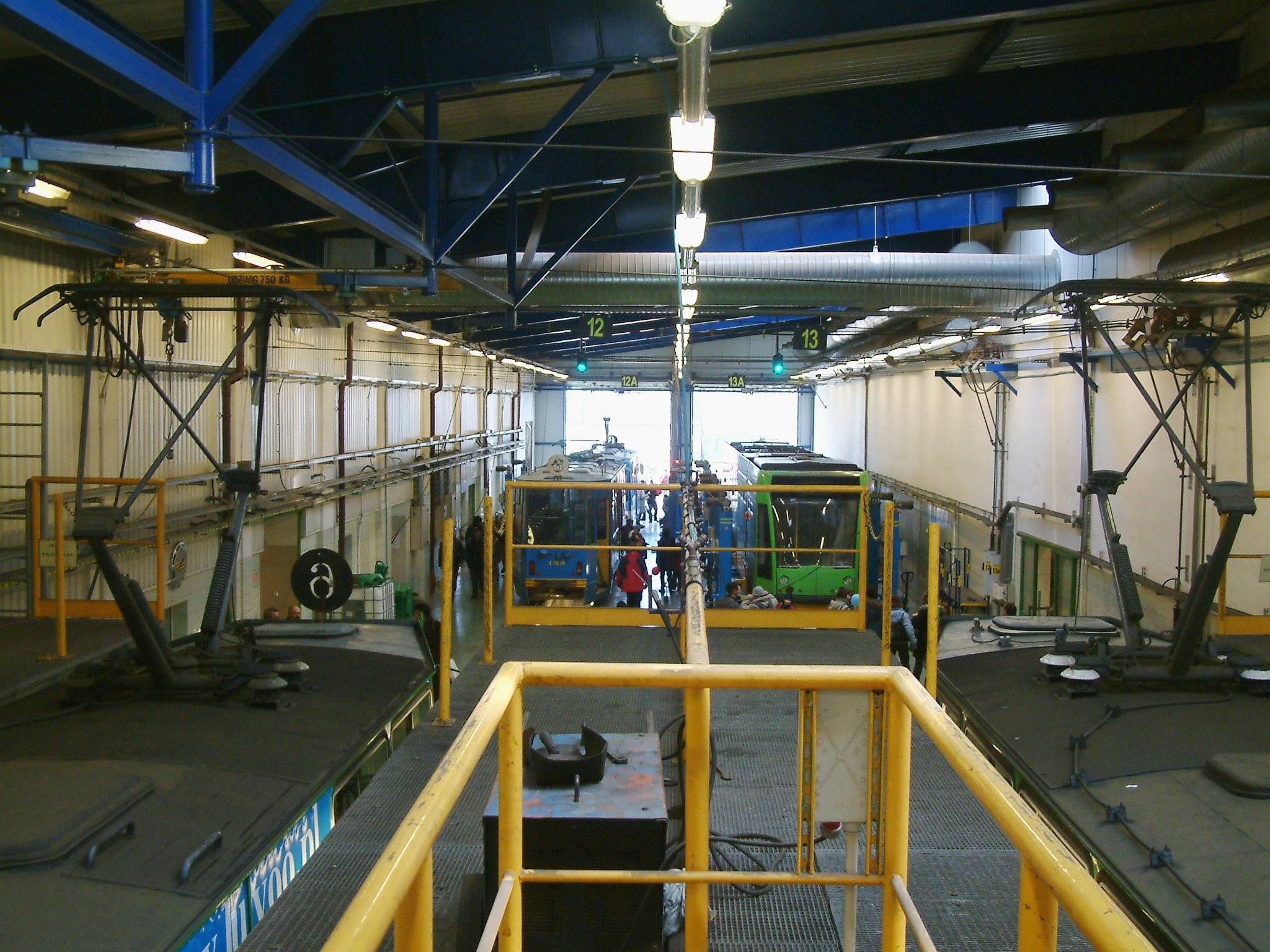
Inside of depot on Głogowska Str.

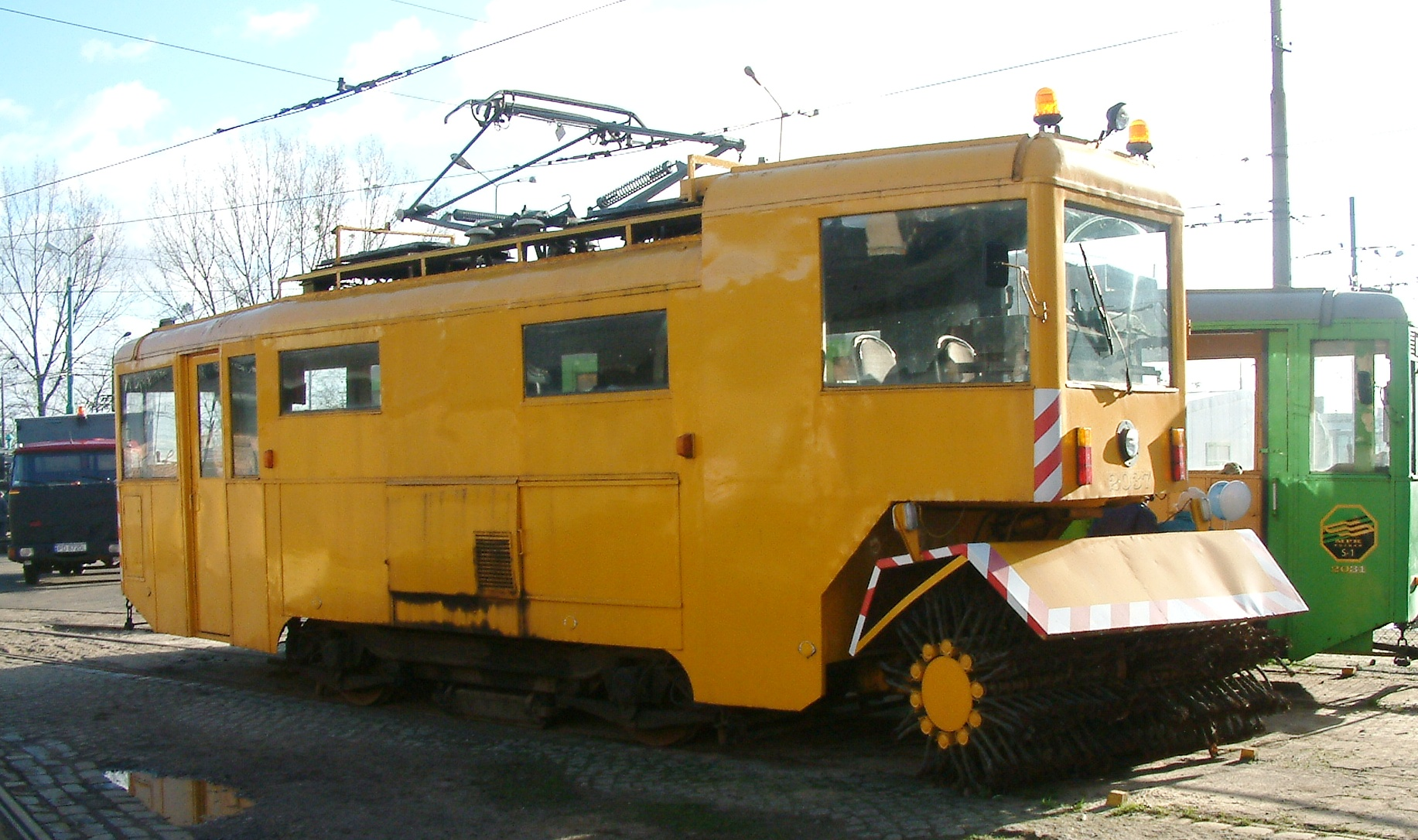
Technical car based on Konstal 4N1

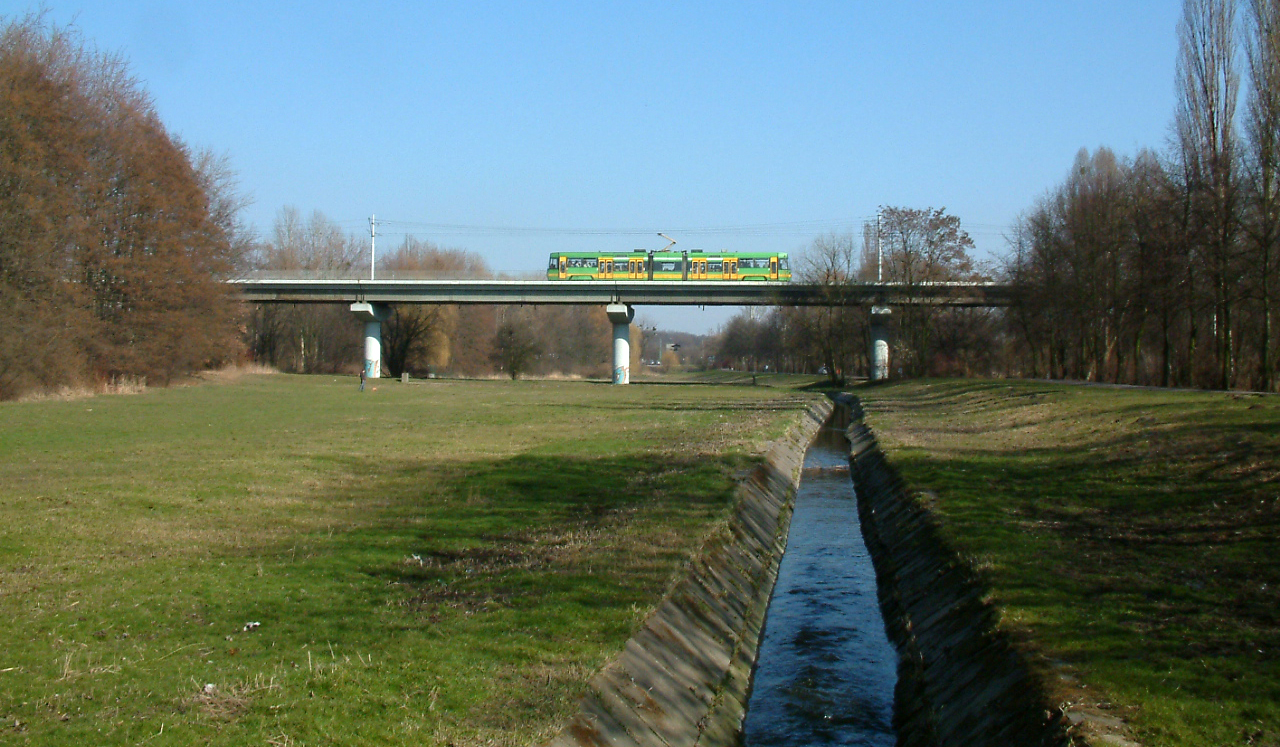
Tatra RT6N1 on overpass over Bogdanka, Poznański Szybki Tramwaj
