= GT8 =

- Duewag GT8 Typ Freiburg, a tram vehicle retired in 1991
- Denel GT-8, a South African tank cannon
