= HCP Puma =

Low-floor tram manufactured by H. Cegielski in Poznań, Poland

118N
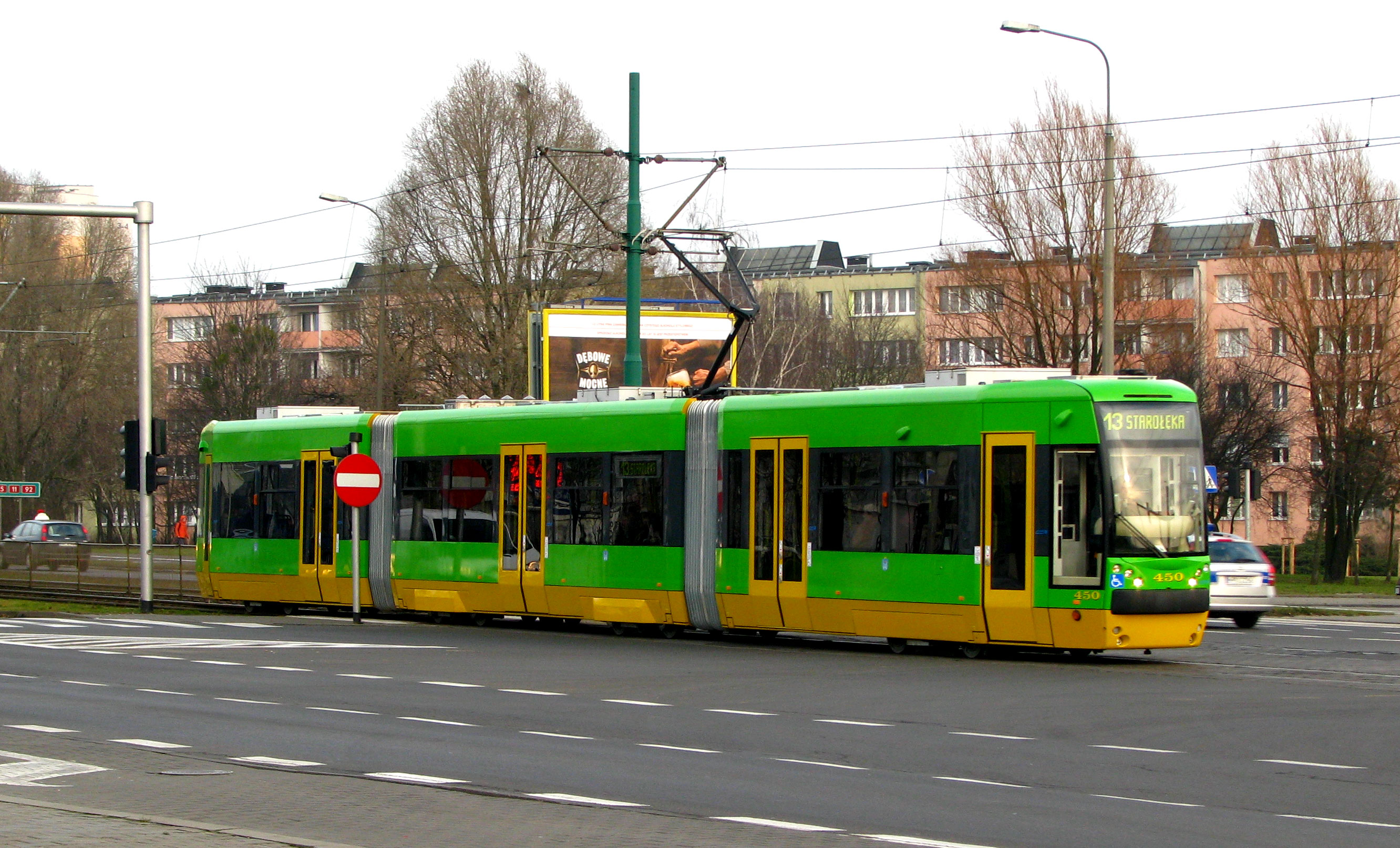
- Type 118N tram
- Stock type: low-floor tram
- Manufacturer: H. Cegielski
- Assembly: Poznań, Poland
- Constructed: 2007
- Entered service: 2008
- Capacity: 132 (82 seats)

Specifications
- Train length: 30,600 mm (100.4 ft)
- Width: 2,400 mm (7.9 ft)
- Height: 3,350 mm (10.99 ft)
- Floor height: 300–800 mm (0.98–2.62 ft)
- Low-floor: 67%
- Articulated sections: 3
- Maximum speed: 70 km/h (43 mph)
- Weight: 36,000 kg (79,000 lb)
- Power output: 4 × 95 kW

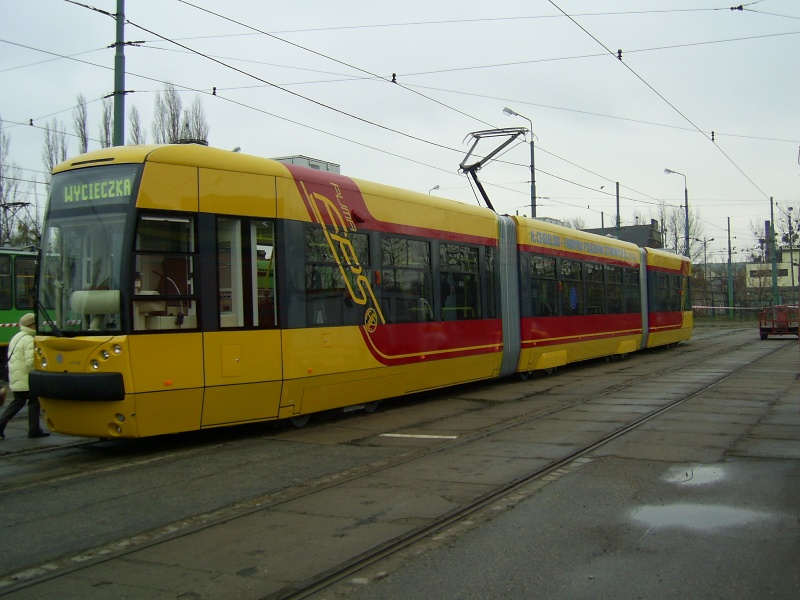
Car 118N in its original colors

HCP Puma (type 118N) is a three-section low-floor tram manufactured by H. Cegielski in Poznań. In 2007, one prototype unit was built, which premiered on 11 June 2007 at the Poznań International Fair. From 2008 to 2011, the vehicle was leased and operated by MPK Poznań. After a drive system failure, it returned to the manufacturer.

== History ==
=== Origins ===
In 1995, H. Cegielski created the first low-floor tram, type 115N, by rebuilding two Konstal 105N cars, which were connected with a low-floor middle section. The company also produced vehicles in consortia, acting as a subcontractor.

At the beginning of the 21st century, many Polish cities planned significant investments in modernizing their tram fleets. H. Cegielski aimed to enter the tram market and decided to design a new low-floor vehicle in response to a tender for the delivery of 15 low-floor trams for Tramwaje Warszawskie company.

=== Design, production, and testing ===
The 118N type vehicle was designed in 2005 by the Tabor Railway Vehicle Institute in collaboration with H. Cegielski and the company nCart.

The prototype was manufactured in 2007 and presented at the Poznań International Fair in June of that year. After the presentation, it returned to the factory for completion. The first test run on the Poznań tram network took place on the night of 1/2 October 2007. On 12 December 2007, Puma received type approval certification and was stationed at the Forteczna depot from that time.

=== Project failure and future plans ===
The manufacturer hoped for interest in the vehicle from several Polish cities, especially Warsaw. Thus, during the premiere presentation, the tram was painted in yellow and red colors and equipped with Warsaw ticket validators. However, no contracts for Puma's delivery were signed.

At the end of 2012, the manufacturer announced plans to modernize the 118N tram and build a second fully low-floor unit. In mid-2022, H. Cegielski began looking for potential buyers for the vehicle, and by the end of 2023, they considered modernizing the tram, provided MPK Poznań expressed interest in using it.

=== Presentations ===
- 11 June 2007 – Poznań International Fair
- 2007 – TRAKO Railway Fair in Gdańsk
- 2008 – InnoTrans railway fair in Berlin

== Construction ==
=== Body ===
The car body is constructed from steel. The sections of the vehicle are connected with pivot joints. Energy-absorbing bumpers are used at the front. The windows are made of tempered glass.

The vehicle is equipped with five pairs of sliding-plug doors. The three middle pairs are double-leaf doors with a width of 1,300 mm, while the two end pairs are single-leaf doors with a width of 700 mm. The doors are equipped with phototubes to prevent passengers from being trapped.

=== Interior ===
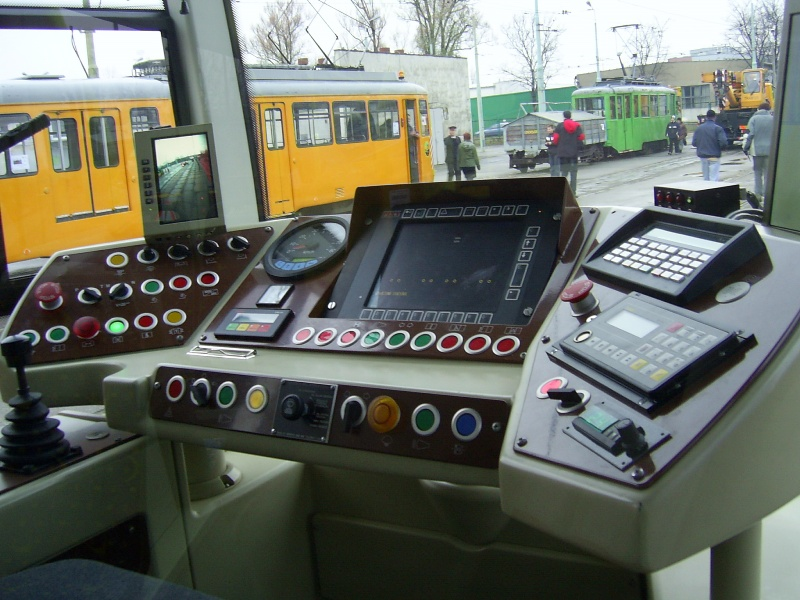
Driver's cab

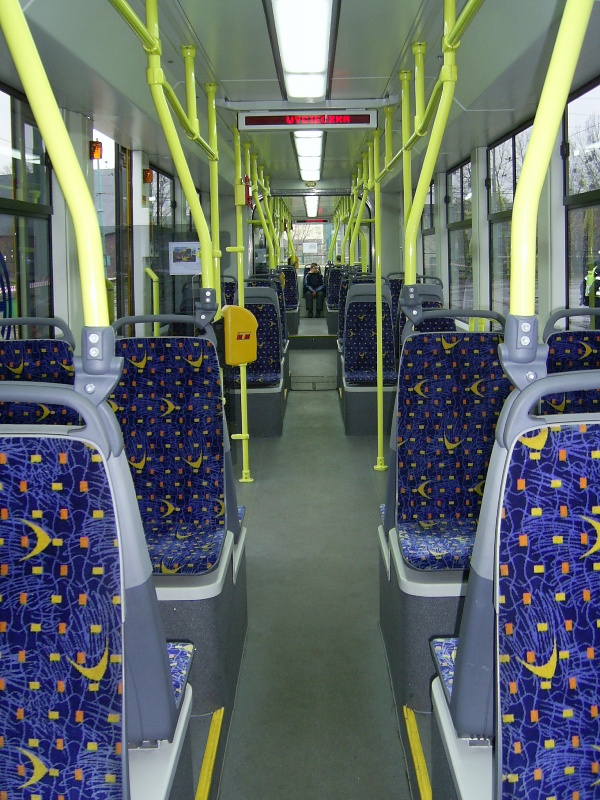
Interior

The tram features 80 seats covered with fabric, arranged mostly in a 2+2 layout.

The low-floor area constitutes 67% of the vehicle's length. The floor height is 300 mm at the entrances, 360 mm in the vestibules, 440 mm above the trailing bogies, and 580 mm above the driving bogies. Above the trailing bogies, the floor rises gently, while in the end sections over the driving bogies, the high-floor area is separated from the low-floor area by a single step.

In the first section, near the second pair of doors, there is a space for a wheelchair or a stroller, along with a manually extendable ramp to facilitate boarding. Another smaller space without seats is provided near the last door.

The passenger area is heated by 14 heating units located under the seats near the entrances. Forced ventilation is supplemented by sliding windows. The tram is equipped with a visual and audio information system. Additionally, the interior is acoustically and thermally insulated.

The driver's cab is equipped with a control panel, microprocessor control, a monitoring system, and air conditioning. Cameras mounted on the sides of the car body replace traditional rearview mirrors.

=== Bogies ===
Puma tram is supported by four two-axle bogies, with the two end bogies under sections I and III being powered, and the two middle bogies under section II being trailer bogies.

The powered bogie type 8NN features an H-shaped open frame, a rocking beam, and two-stage suspension. The first stage of suspension consists of rubber-metal springs, while the second stage uses double coil springs with rubber bumpers. The car body is connected to the bogie via a large bearing. Braking is handled by electromagnetic track brakes and an electro-hydraulic braking system with a disc brake mounted on the hollow shaft of the drive unit. The front bogie also includes wheel flange lubrication, sandboxes, and a snowplow.

The trailer bogie type 9NN has a similar construction to the powered bogie type 8NN. The only difference is in the electro-hydraulic brake, with the discs mounted on the wheelset axles.

The wheelbase of the powered bogies is 1,800 mm, and the trailer bogies is 1,500 mm. The diameter of new and worn wheels is 590 mm and 530 mm, respectively.

=== Drive system ===
Puma tram is powered by direct current drawn from an overhead lines via a current collector mounted on the roof of the middle section, supplied by Stemmann. The drive is provided by four induction motors type STDa 250-4A from EMIT, each with a power output of 95 kW. The tram uses impulse starting based on IGBT transistors.

== Operation ==
Country	City	Operator	Number of units	Fleet numbers	Delivery years	Operational years	Source
Poland	Poznań	MPK Poznań	1	450	2007	2008–2011	

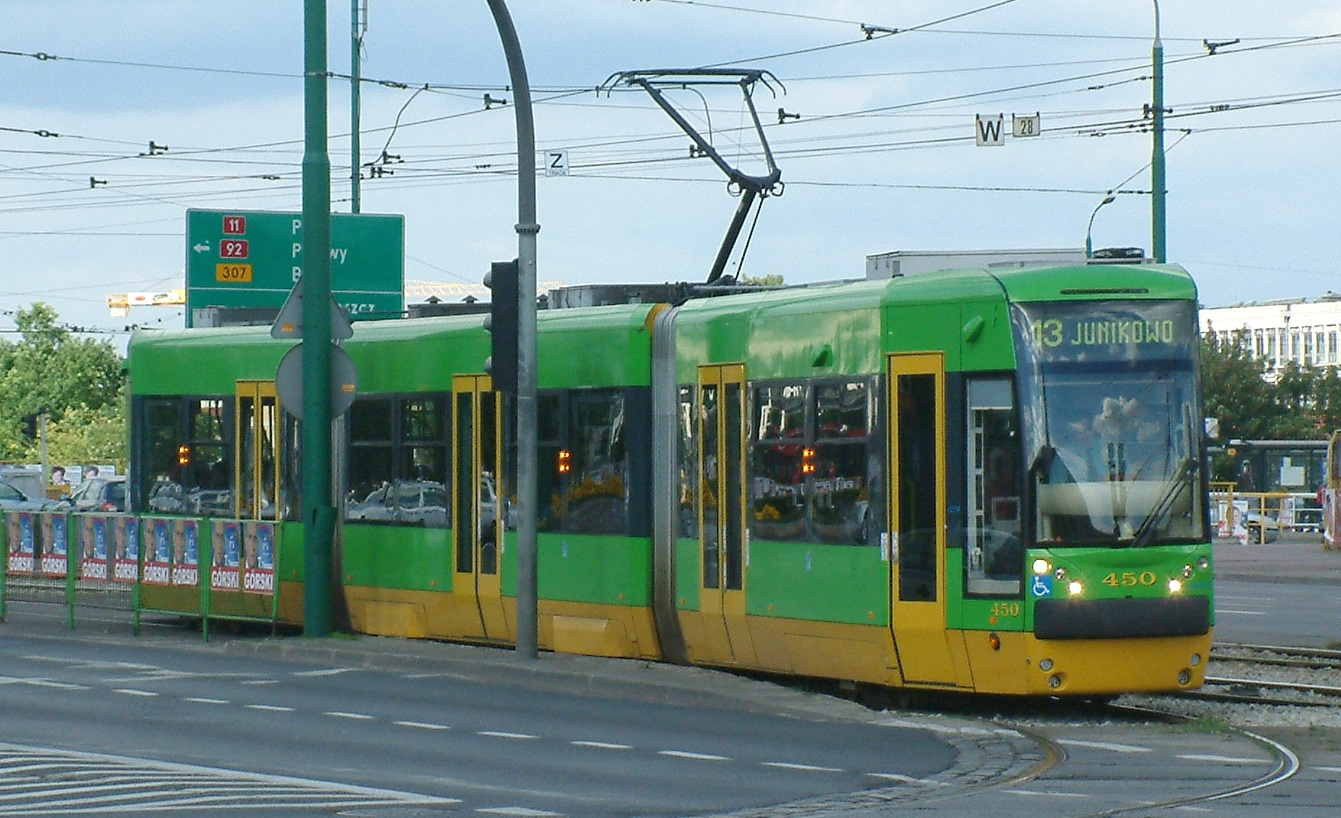
Puma on the streets of Poznań

In December 2008, MPK Poznań leased Puma for four years, and on 15 December 2008, it began operation on the less busy lines no. 5 and 13. However, the tram frequently experienced breakdowns and spent a significant amount of time in the depot.

In March 2011, the vehicle was involved in a collision, necessitating repairs to the front end. The manufacturer completed the repairs in August 2011, but after traveling only 18 km, the tram broke down again. By December 2011, the issues with the drive control system had not been resolved, and the operator could no longer afford to lease the Puma, resulting in the tram's return to the H. Cegielski factory.
