= HCP 115N =

Prototype tram produced in Poznań, Poland

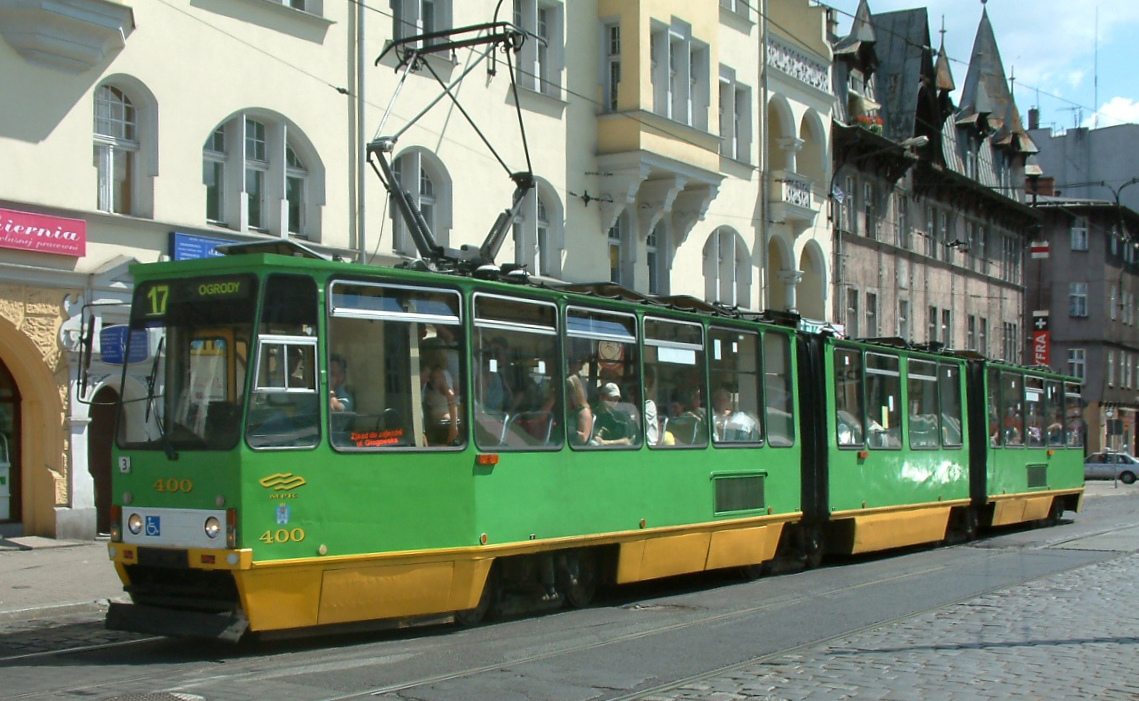

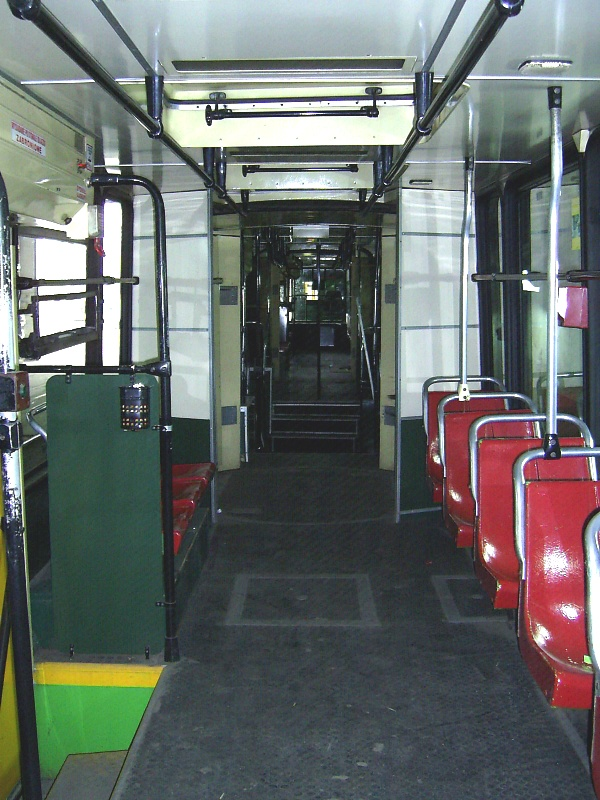
- In service: 1995–2006
- Manufacturer: HCP
- Built at: Poznań
- Entered service: 1995
- Scrapped: 2011
- Number built: 1
- Number scrapped: 1
- Design code: 115N
- Fleet numbers: 400
- Capacity: 235 with 34 sitting places
- Operator: MPK Poznań

Specifications
- Car length: 26,500 millimetres (1,040 in)
- Width: 2,358 millimetres (92.8 in)
- Height: 3,160 millimetres (124 in)
- Low-floor: 19.2%
- Maximum speed: 70 km/h (43 mph)
- Weight: 35,000 kilograms (77,000 lb)
- Track gauge: 1,435 mm (4 ft 8 1/2 in)

Notes/references
- Model name used by manufacturer and operator: Konstal 105N/2

HCP 115N (type assigned by Research and Development Center for Rail Vehicles (Polish: Ośrodek Badawczo-Rozwojowy Pojazdów Szynowych, OBRPS): 115N, type introduced by the manufacturer and used by the operator: 105N/2, nicknamed glizda ("earthworm")) – the first Polish prototype partially low-floor tram that was produced by H. Cegielski factory in Poznań. It was made in 1995 from two Konstal 105N cars used by MPK Poznań and in service until 2006. In 2011 the tram has been scrapped.

== History ==
=== Genesis ===
In the 1990s the decision was made that tracks of the Poznań Fast Tram, that was under construction at the time, will be connected with tram network which caused to buy a high capacity trams. Despite the successful tests of composition made of four coupled Konstal 105Na tramcars, the operator wanted to buy low-floor trams. As the offer of European manufacturers of this type of trams was beyond the financial possibilities of the city, and there was no vehicle meeting the requirements of MPK on the domestic market, it was decided to build a new type of tram.

=== Production and premiere ===
In 1994 the H. Cegielski factory bought from MPK two 105N tramcars of fleet numbers 163 and 164. In the same year, with the intention about subsequent units of the new vehicle, MPK bought additional five cars from Tram Communication Enterprise in Katowice (Polish: Przedsiębiorstwo Komunikacji Tramwajowej w Katowicach). In mid-1995, the construction of a tram with new traction characteristics was completed, using vehicles purchased by HCP.

In June 1995 the new 115N vehicle was presented at the Poznań International Fair. Because of works on the electric system, the tram was not capable of making demonstration drives.

=== The fall of the project ===
In 1996 HCP proposed the 115N trams on the tender for low-floor trams for Poznań, but the offer was declined as not meeting the requirements, because MPK wanted to buy new trams. In addition, because of the high unreliability of the prototype, it was not decided to mass-produce the tram. Due to decision of not making the serial production the tramcars bought from PKT Katowice that were supposed to be modified were dismantled to pieces with exception of one that got earlier put into service in MPK.

== Construction ==
=== Body ===
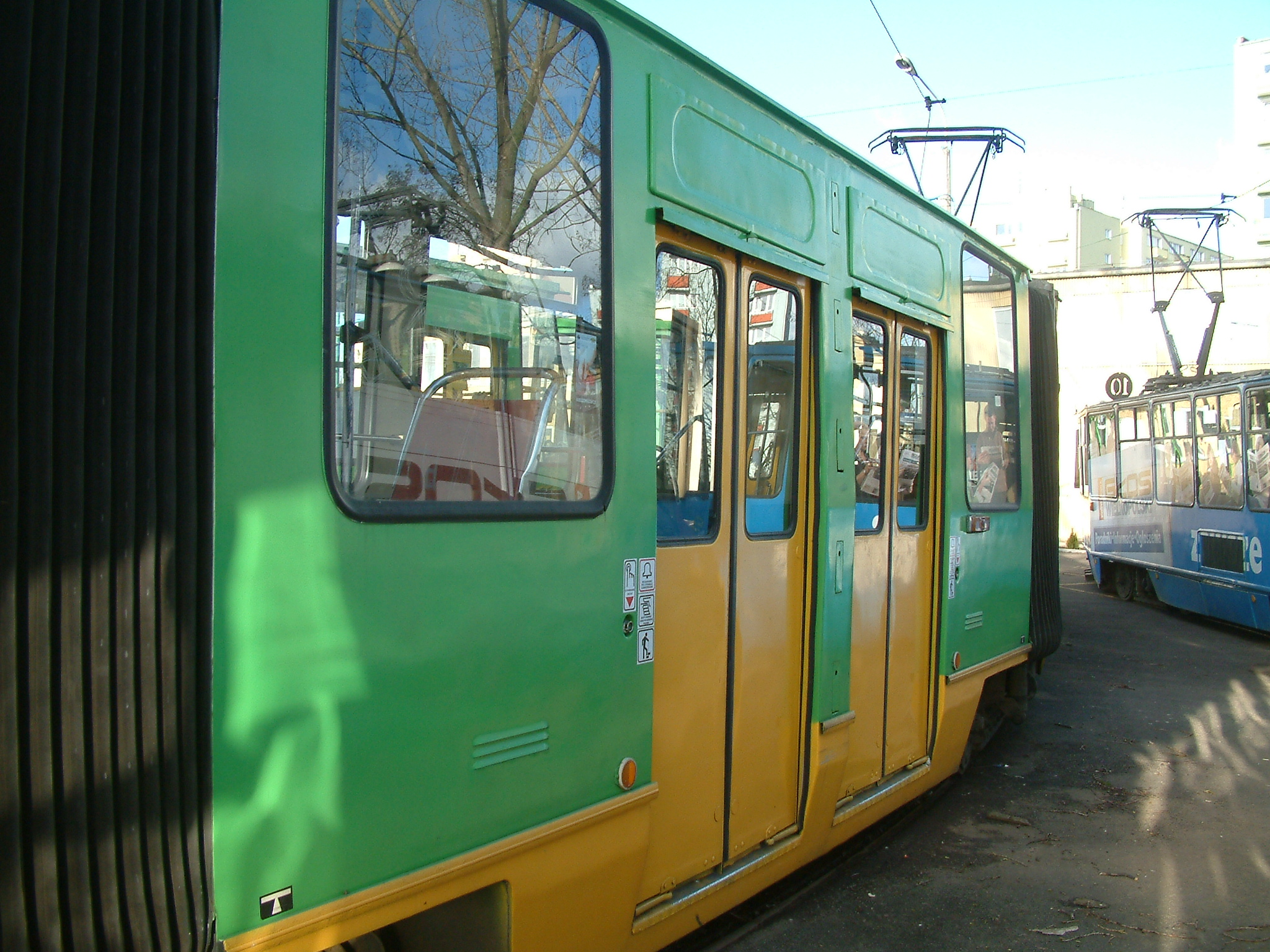
The low-floor middle section

The 115N type tram had three sections. The first and the last one were made from the reconstruction of 105N tramcars bought by the manufacturer and adapting them to connect with a newly made low-floor section by a pivot joint covered by a black concertina.

The middle section had two pairs of double doors. All of the doors were made from plastic and had individual opening buttons.

=== Interior ===
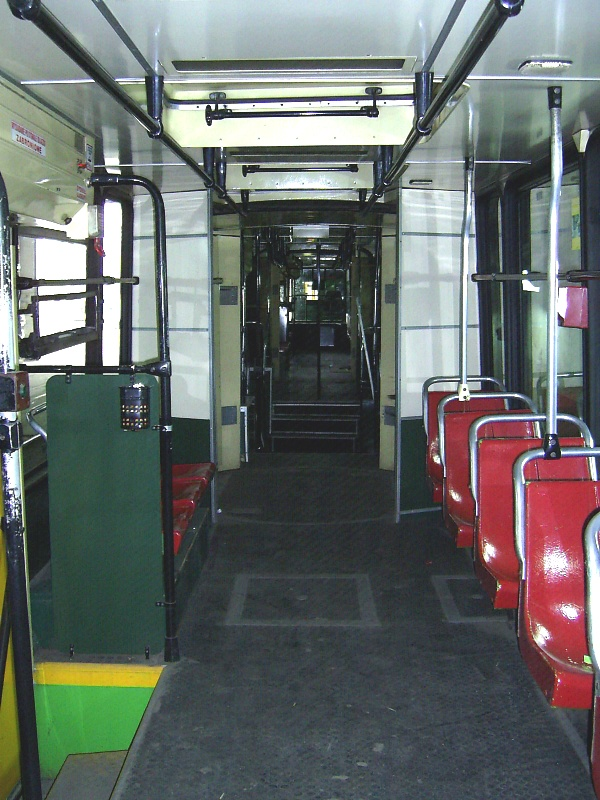
Interior of the first section

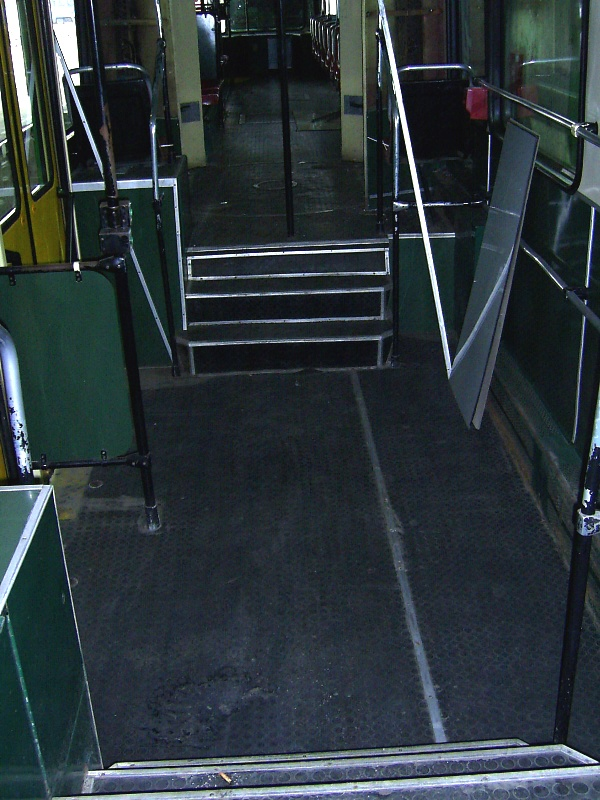
View of the low-floor section

The tram had thirty-four soft upholstered and vandalism-proof seats. The frontier sections had fifteen of them, and the new middle section had four. The tram also had tilting windows.

The low-floor in the middle section was placed 350 millimetres (14 in) above the ground level and was 19.2% of the entire length of the tram. The equipment and interior layout of the middle section were adapted to the transport of disabled people in wheelchairs and prams. There were three designated places for them that had inertial belts.

The passenger information system consisted of a broadcasting device that was placed on the dashboard and used by motorman and speakers placed on the ceiling. The information could be played from a tape or through a microphone. In addition, the tram's front had a scrollable directional board.

=== Bogies ===
All of the four bogie of the tram were 2NN bogies modernized by HCP. They were equipped with the second degree of springing. The wheelbase was 1,900 millimetres (75 in). The distance between the middle bogies was 7,000 millimetres (23 ft 0 in), and the distance between the outermost and middle bogies was 6,000 millimetres (19 ft 8 in).

=== Drive system ===
Glizda was powered by direct current taken from an overhead contact line by an automatically lowered OTK1-type pantograph placed on the roof. The drive was provided by 8 DC motors with a power of 41.5 kW each. The starting system was from Konstal 105Na.

== Service ==
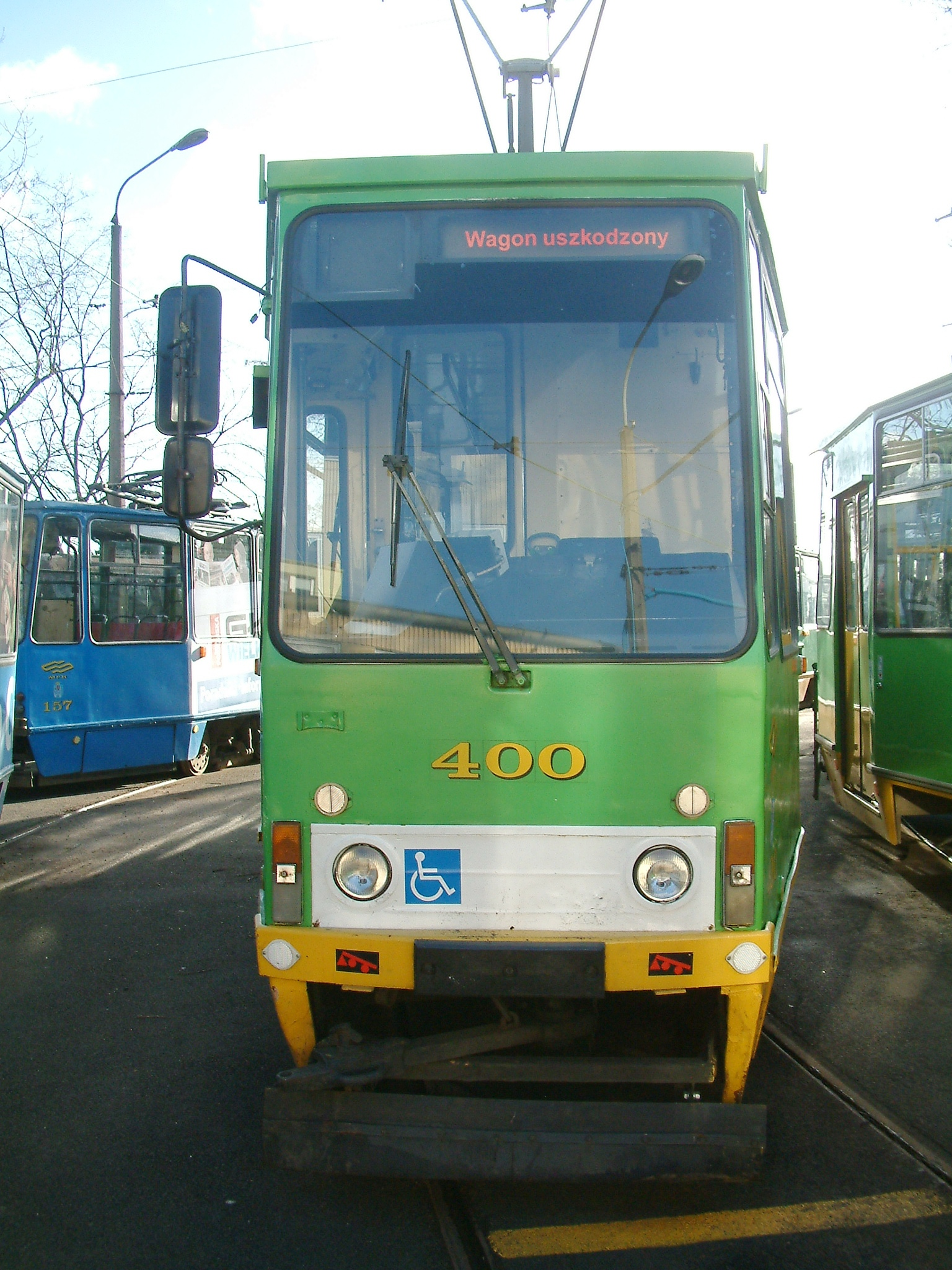
Retired glizda, 2007

Country	City	Operator	Number delivered	Fleet number	In delivery	In service
Poland	Poznań	MPK Poznań	1	400	1995	1995–2006

On July 12, 1995 glizda was delivered to MPK Poznań. The tram got a fleet number 400 and was assigned to Głogowska tram depot. The vehicle also got a new yellow-light green colour scheme of the operator.

In mid-September 1995 the tram began its service on route 6. As the 105N tramcars No. 163 and No. 164 that were used to make a new tram deleted from the inventory on September 1, 1995, and the new 115N tram was bought from the manufacturer only on December 16, 1996, the courses of a new vehicle were recorded as the ones of 105N tramcars No. 163+164 composition. Until the opening of Poznań Fast Tram in 1997 the 115N was running rarely on another tram lines. After the event the situation had changed and the tram could be met on line 14 and another that were handled by Głogowska depot.

During the service, the upholstered seats were replaced with the same ones as used in 105N trams in MPK and the frontal directional board was replaced with a coffer for plastic boards.

Because of the frequent malfunctions, mostly of the doors, voltage converters and cables rubbing inside pivotal joints, the tram was put out of service sometimes even for a few months. The vehicle was not in service from July to September in 1998, in September 2000, at summer of 2001, from June to August in 2002 and in January 2003.

In May 2003 the tram No. 400 was used in Maturalny tramwaj Rexony advertising campaign so it was assigned to line 5 and was painted in white-blue-violet color scheme. After the campaign has been finished, the vehicle recovered its original color scheme with exception of grille that retained white color and had a blue sign that informed of adaption for disabled passengers.

In 2006, again due to cables rubbing inside pivotal joints, the vehicle went to depot and was later placed on side tracks near Budziszyńska Street. Despite a rationalizing project that was to eliminate tram's faults the tram was never running again. In early 2008 the tram was transported to Modertrans facility, from where afterwards returned to the side tracks. On April 14, 2010, the 115N was deleted from MPK's inventory and in August 2011 was sold to Modertrans. There were attempts to preserve the tram as an exhibit but on August 24, 2011, it left the side tracks. On the next day glizda has been dismantled and the remains were transported to a scrapyard in Śrem.

== See also ==
- List of trams produced in Poland
