= Duewag GT8 Typ Freiburg =

Class of tram in Freiburg

GT8
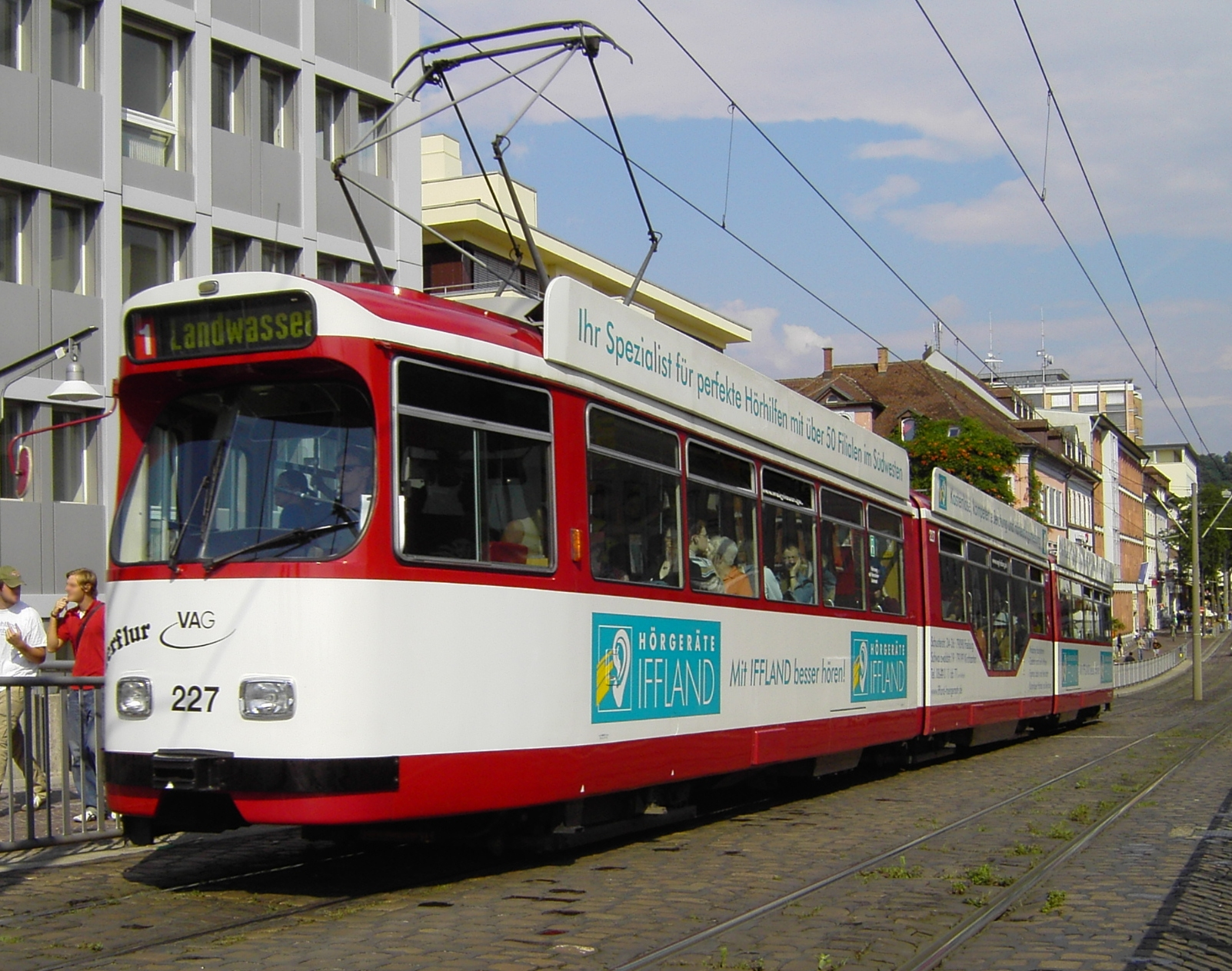
- Manufacturer: Duewag
- Constructed: 1st series: 1971–72; 2nd series: 1981–82; 3rd series: 1990–91
- Number built: 25
- Fleet numbers: 1st series: 201–204; 2nd series: 205–214; 3rd series: 221–231

Specifications
- Train length: 32.845 m (107 ft 9 in)
- Width: 1st series: 2.200 m (7 ft 2 1/2 in); 2nd series: 2.320 m (7 ft 7 1/4 in); 3rd series: 2.320 m (7 ft 7 1/4 in)
- Maximum speed: Design: 70 km/h (43 mph); Legislation: 62 km/h (39 mph)
- Weight: 1st series: 36 tonnes (35 long tons; 40 short tons); 2nd series: 38 tonnes (37 long tons; 42 short tons); 3rd series: 39.57 tonnes (38.95 long tons; 43.62 short tons)
- Power output: 1-hour: 1st series: 4 × 95 kW (380 kW or 510 hp); 2nd series: 4 × 150 kW (600 kW or 805 hp); 3rd series: 4 × 150 kW (600 kW)
- Electric system(s): 1st series: 600 V DC (750 V DC from 1983); 2nd/3rd series: 750 V DC, Overhead lines
- AAR wheel arrangement: B′+B′+B′+B′
- Track gauge: 1,000 mm (3 ft 3 3/8 in)

The Duewag GT8 Typ Freiburg is a three-part eight-axle articulated tram used on the Freiburg im Breisgau's tram network. From 1971 to 1991, these trams were exclusively produced for the VAG Freiburg by Duewag in three series, which defined them as the Freiburg type, Typ Freiburg. They are designed to be used uni-directionally.

== Construction ==
Trams with Jacobs bogies were not suitable for the partially narrow, curved radii in Freiburg, so a new type of tram was created. Freiburg's trams were based on the classic 1956 Duewag articulated tram. In contrast to conventional articulated trams, the centre of gravity of Freiburg's trams was not located at the Jacobs bogies but underneath the middle section, to which two tram end cars were attached. In addition to the all-axle drive, an improved structure gauge was also used, totalling 34 metres (112 ft) of length.

After the twelve-axle tram manufactured by the Rhein-Haardtbahn company, Freiburg's trams were regarded as the second longest tram car in the world.

== Series ==
=== First series (1971/72) ===
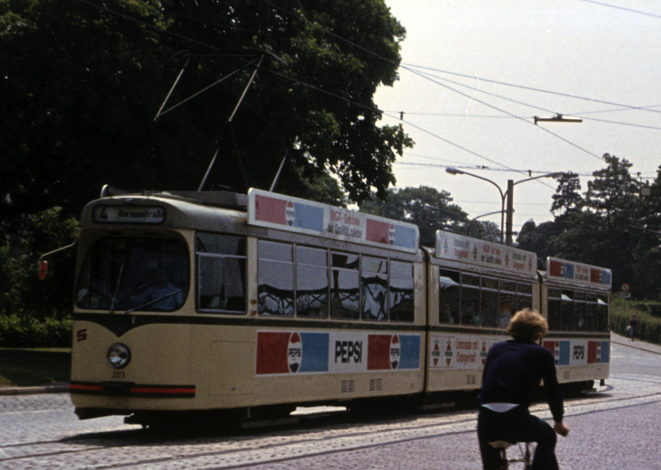
Tram 203 with its original paintwork around 1979

Between 1971 and 1972, the Freiburger Verkehrs AG initially obtained four vehicles using so-called Geamatic controls. They were given fleet numbers 201–204. Carriage 202 (externally distinguishable by its central double headlight) was the first to receive an automatic set point adjuster. They were designed for travel without conductors and to replace some of the obsolete and personnel-intensive vehicles from the early 1950s, which were still based on the War Tram Cars.

The trams were originally each equipped with a single headlight and a cream-coloured livery. During the mid-1980s, they had two headlights installed, which were fitted in the centre. They were repainted red and white in 1981.

In 2001, the trams were decommissioned for use in Freiburg. They were later used across Łódź's tram network, where they were operated by Międzygminna Komunikacja Tramwajowa on line 46 to Ozorków. Trams 2 through 4 were later scrapped during this period.

=== Second series (1981/82) ===
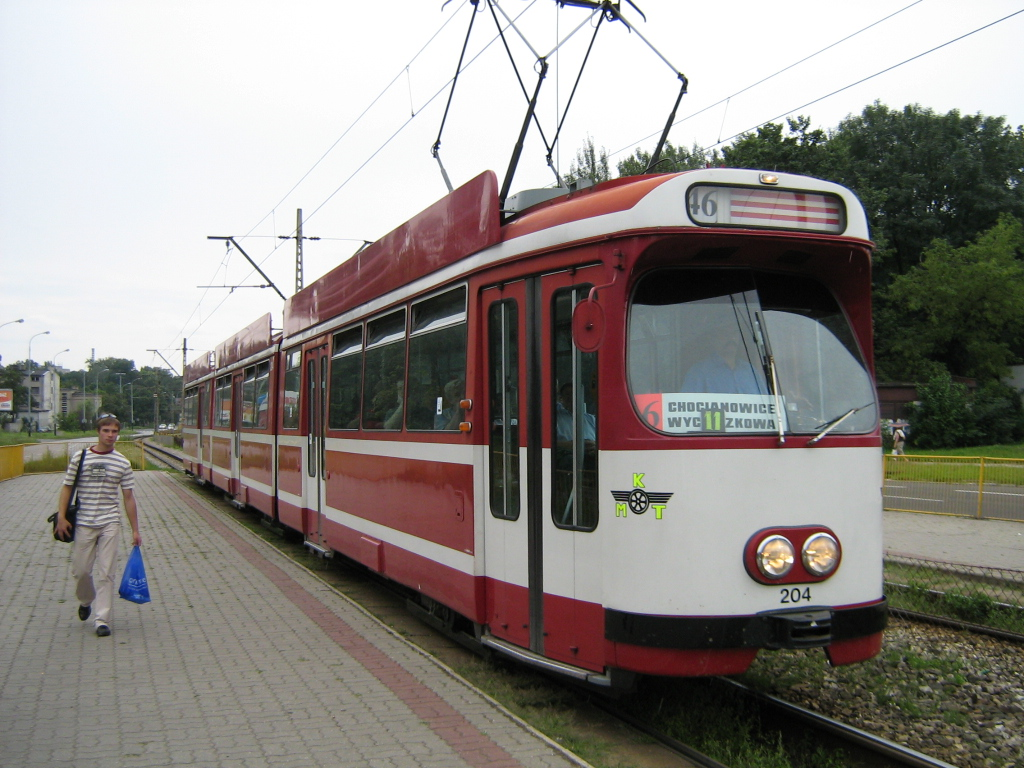
Tram 206 in Łódź

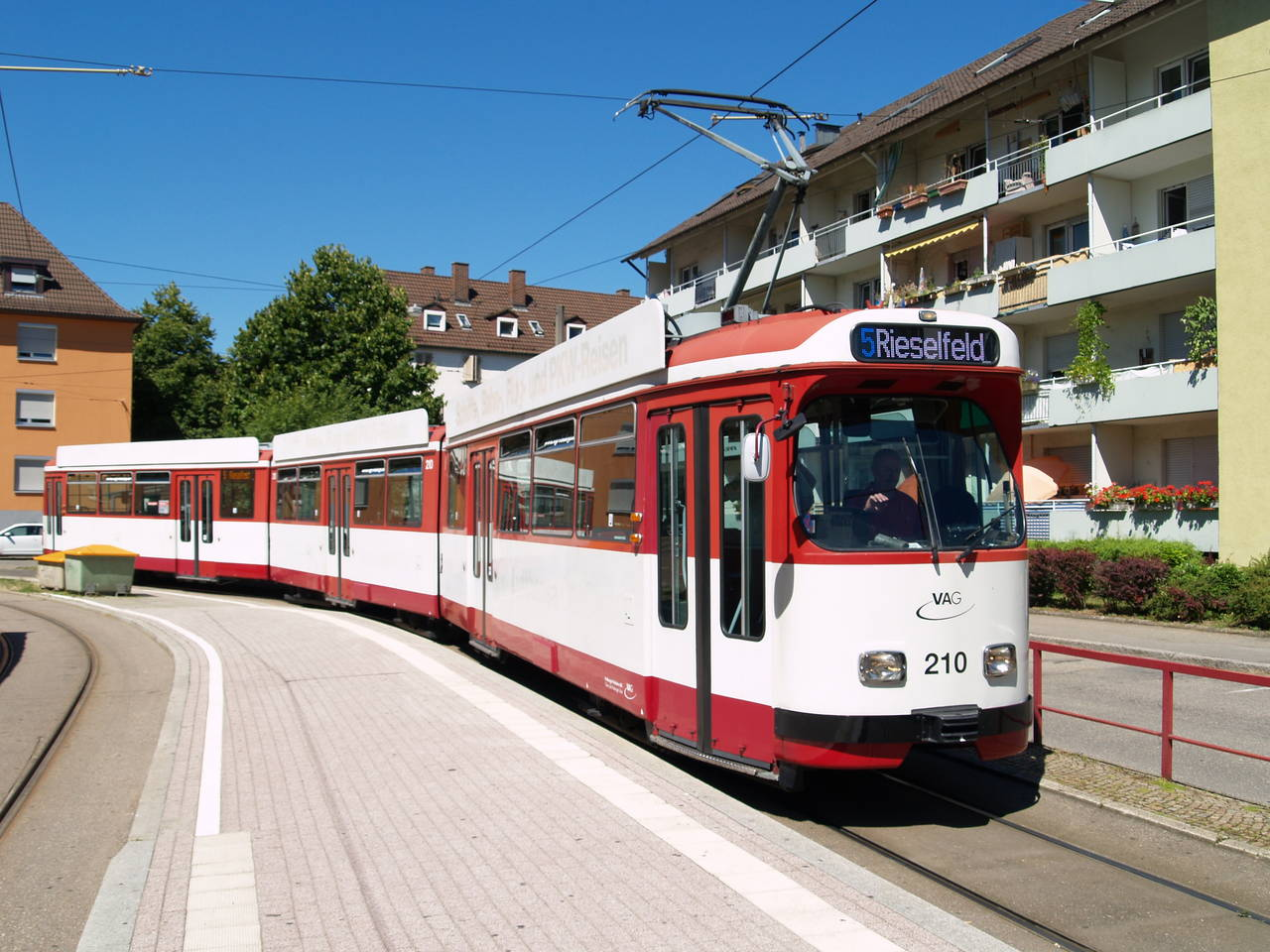
GT8K 210 at Hornusstraße, 2013

After positive experiences with the first four trams, the fleet was expanded. Ten more trams were ordered towards the end of the 1970s. These were commissioned in 1981 and 1982 and were given the numbers 205–214, also referred to as GT8K. They were coated in a red and white livery and had two central front headlights. On journeys, there was no need for a conductor, and the last type of tram with trailer cars were discarded.

At a width of 2.32 metres, they are twelve centimetres wider than the trams from the first series, which, in some curves of the network, required new tracks to be laid. An example of this was at Schwabentor. The larger width made it possible to make trams slightly bigger than the first series. Both series made use of high floors, but in the second series these were accessible by means of three normal steps. The seats were also laid out 1+2, enabling more standing passengers to board the tram.

Instead of the mechanics of the first series, the second series used a direct current controller, which was operated via a set point transmitter. It enabled acceleration and deceleration to take place without jerking. In comparison to the first series, which had scissor pantographs, the second series used single-armed pantographs.

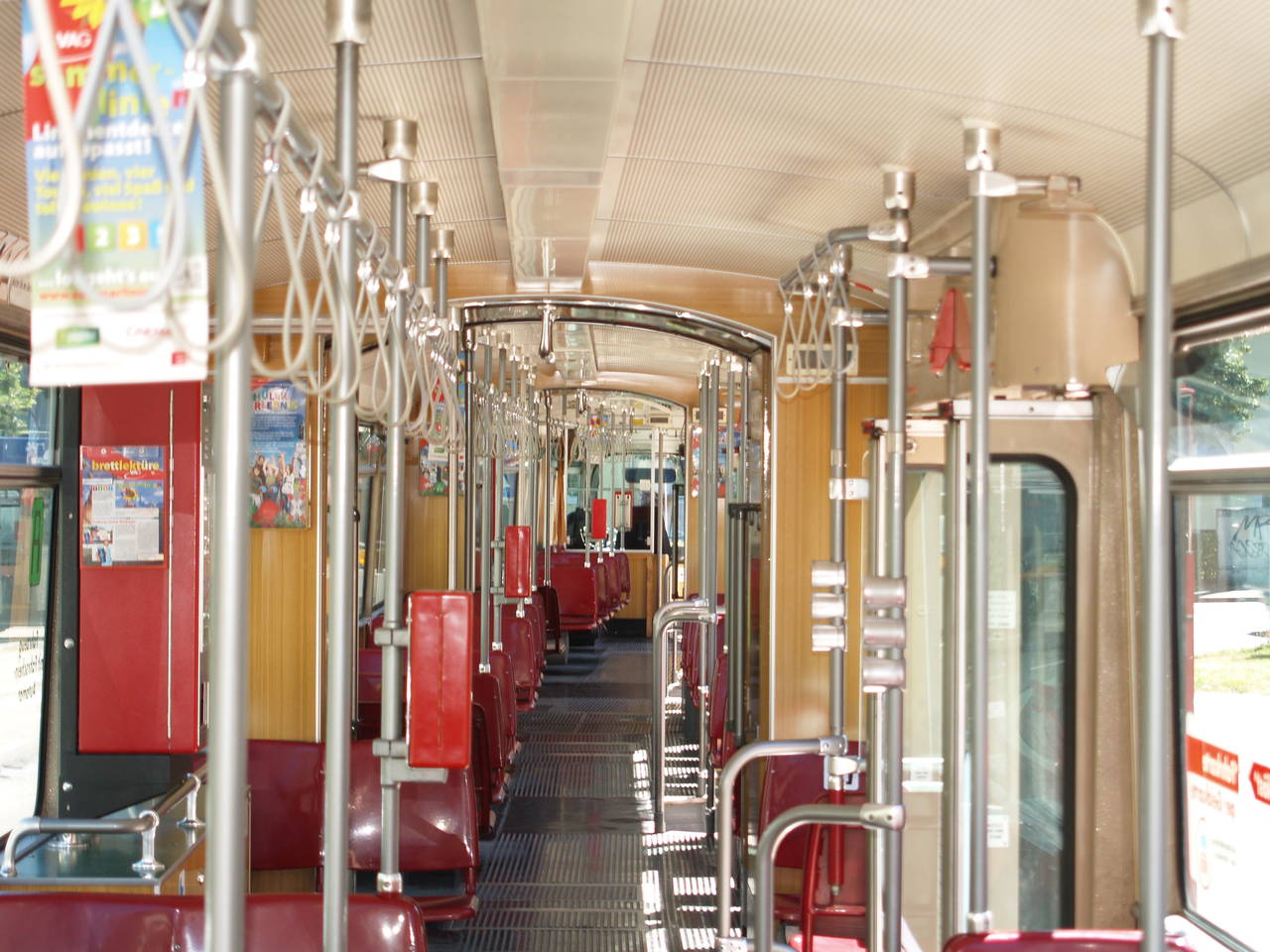
Interior of a GT8K

Tram 205 is now used as a historic motor coach; tram 207 was scrapped in 2007; and trams 208 and 209 were sold to Ulm's tram network, where they were merged to form tram number 17 and used as a bi-directional rail grinder. From 2012, trams 206 and 210–214 were used full-time due to the refurbishment of the GT8Zs. Previously, they were only used during peak hours and for transporting spectators to SC Freiburg home matches. Tram 206, which had already been marketed for sale, was now reactivated. In addition, they were all equipped with LED indicators. They are the only Freiburg trams, alongside the Combinos, to have fitted LED indicators. The remaining trams were still being used until the completion of the GT8Z refurbishment and the delivery of the new CAF Urbos in 2017.

=== Third series (1990/91) ===
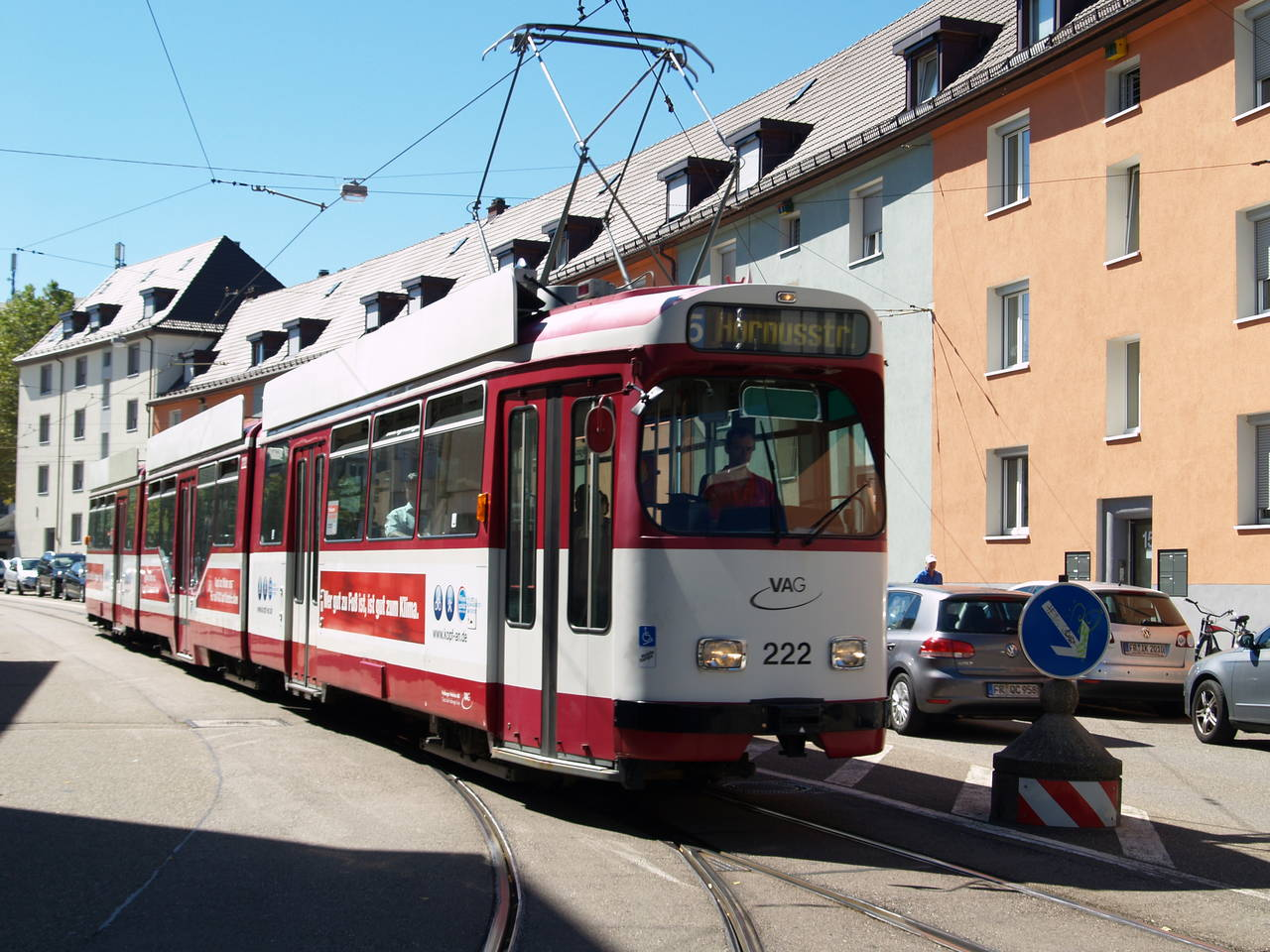
GT8N 222 at Hornusstraße

In 1990 and 1991, a further eleven motorised trams were obtained with numbers 221 to 231. In contrast to the second series, they were equipped with a low-floor middle section. Because of their low leverage, they are also referred to as GT8N. Otherwise, they differ from their predecessor series by means of shear current pickups. They replaced the GT4, now used in Stuttgart, in the short term. All vehicles in this series were fitted with a dot-matrix display in 2001 and run on lines 1, 3, and 5.
