= Protram 405N =

Prototype tram built for MPK Kraków

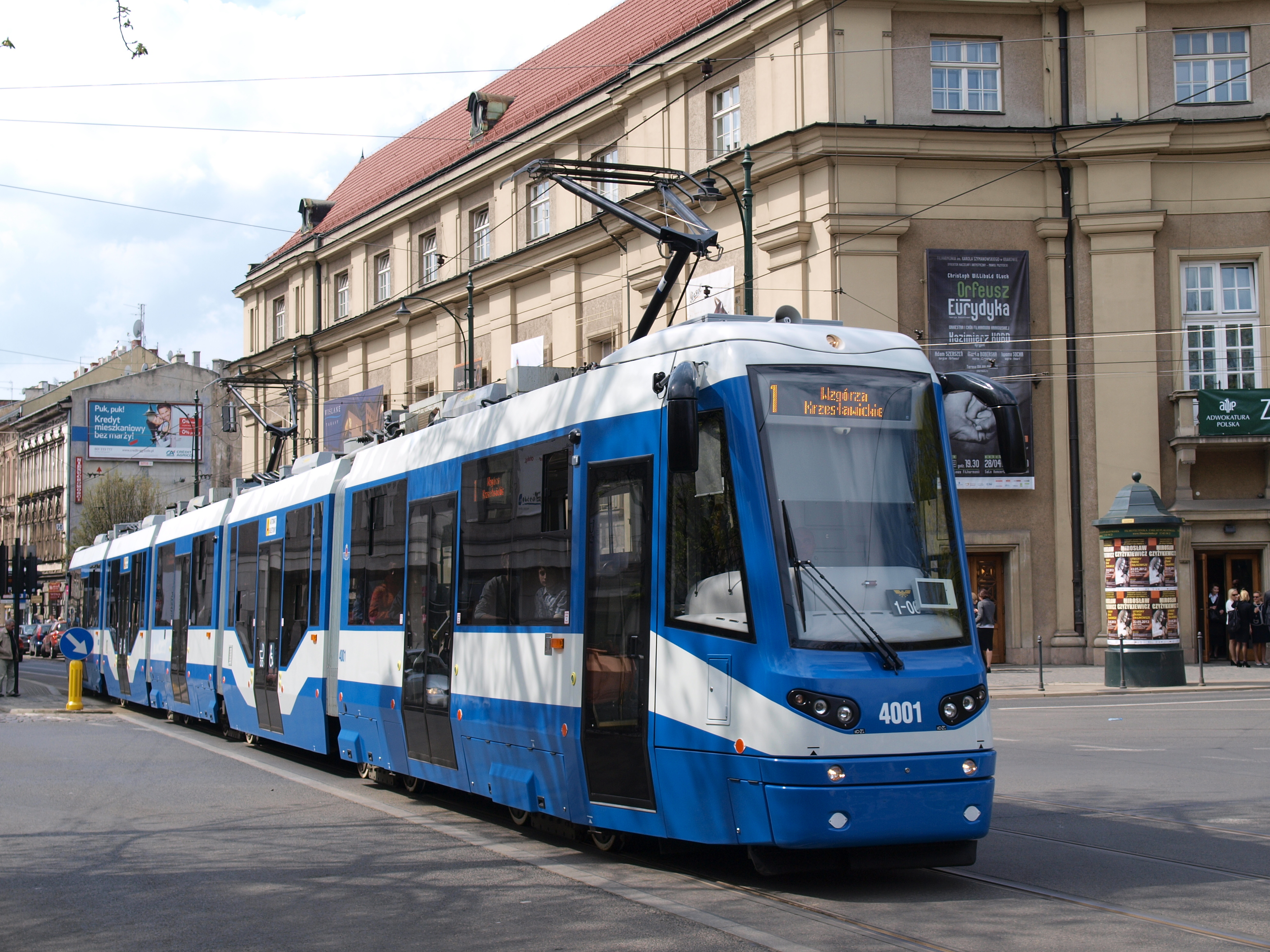
- 405N on the second day of operation on line 1
- Manufacturer: Protram
- Assembly: Wrocław, Poland
- Constructed: 2011–2012
- Entered service: April 20, 2012
- Capacity: 297 (57 seats)

Specifications
- Train length: 40,570 millimetres (133.10 ft)
- Width: 2,354 millimetres (7.723 ft)
- Height: 3,750 millimetres (12.30 ft)
- Floor height: 915 millimetres (3.002 ft)
- Low-floor: 25%
- Articulated sections: 5
- Wheelbase: 5,200–8,400 millimetres (17.1–27.6 ft)
- Maximum speed: 70 kilometres per hour (43 mph)
- Weight: 63,500 kilograms (140,000 lb)
- Axle load: 1,900 millimetres (6.2 ft)
- Electric system: 600 V
- UIC classification: Bo′(Bo)′(Bo)′(Bo)′(Bo)′Bo′

The Protram 405N (type designation given by the manufacturer and used by the operator – 405N, other designations include 405N-Kr and 405Kr) is a prototype tram built between 2011 and 2012 at the Protram factory in Wrocław, specifically for MPK Kraków. The vehicle was created by modernizing three 105Na type vehicles manufactured at the Konstal plant in Chorzów, which were connected by two low-floor sections based on pivot joints. Only one unit was produced. Due to a change in the operator's policy, further modernization of this type was discontinued, and the decision was made to purchase new trams instead.

== History ==
=== Origins and prototype production ===
Between 1975 and 1992, Kraków received 105N type trams and their derivatives, produced by Konstal in Chorzów. At its peak, over 400 of these vehicles were in operation. In 1999, MPK Kraków began updating its fleet to meet contemporary trends and to adapt tram services to the needs of all passengers, including the elderly and those with disabilities. By 2011, there was a search for a replacement for the sets of three 105Na type vehicles used on the busiest routes. On 13 July 2011, due to the inability to purchase a new tram of this class, a tender was announced for the creation of the 405N-Kr tram, which would be a modernization of three 105Na vehicles. Bids were submitted by Modertrans Poznań and Protram, with Protram ultimately winning the competition. Initially, it was planned that the tram would be operational on Kraków's tracks by the end of 2011, but this was ultimately achieved on 20 April 2012.

=== Project demise ===
After selecting the contractor, there were plans that if the vehicle received positive feedback, most of Kraków's 105Na vehicles would be modernized in this way. Under the agreement, Protram provided the operator with complete technical documentation of the vehicle, along with proprietary rights, a type approval certificate, and test results, aiming to reduce the cost of building subsequent 405N vehicles. Ultimately, MPK Kraków limited itself to a single prototype tram of this type and decided to purchase new trams about 40 meters in length. In July 2014, the company ordered Pesa Krakowiak vehicles.

== Construction ==
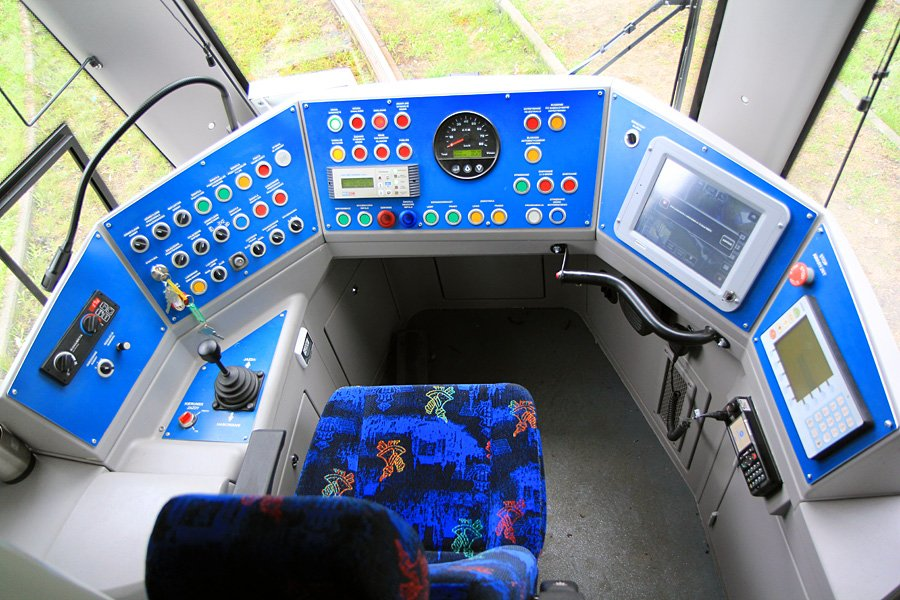
Driver's cabin

The prototype tram type 405N was created by converting three 105Na type vehicles, numbered 450, 454, and 456, into a single-level tram consisting of five sections, two of which are low-floor. This single-sided and single-direction vehicle, with a length of 40.57 meters, was the longest Polish tram from its construction in 2012 until the end of June 2015, when the Pesa factory in Bydgoszcz delivered the first Krakowiak tram to Kraków, measuring nearly 43 meters in length.

=== Interior ===
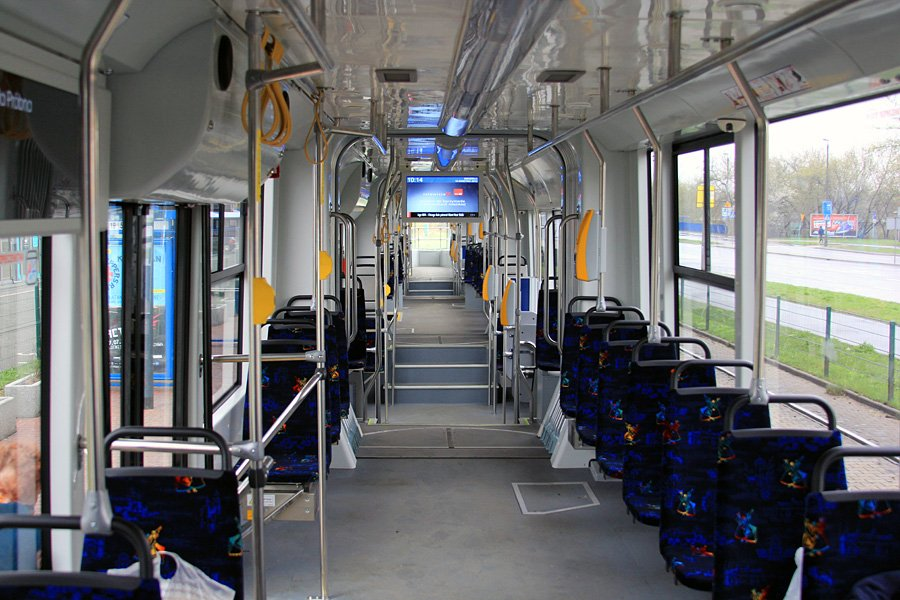
Interior of the tram

The tram has 7 outward-sliding doors. The first and last of these are single-leaf, while the others are double-leaf and centrally located on the side of each section.

Inside, the tram features 57 seats upholstered with fabric patterned with lajkoniks, and the total capacity of the tram is 297 people. The floor height in the first, third, and fifth sections is 915 mm. The low-floor sections, at 365 mm high, are in the second and fourth sections, making up 25% of the total floor area. The connection between sections with different floor heights is bridged by three steps. The passenger compartment is also equipped with a visual information system, 10 ticket validators, 2 ticket machines, monitoring, a ventilation system, and air conditioning, with the units mounted on the roof of the vehicle.

The driver's cabin has been significantly modernized and differs from that used in the 105Na type vehicles. The cabin is air-conditioned.

=== Bogies ===
The tram rests on six two-axle powered bogies with a wheelbase of 1,900 mm. The first two are under the first section, the next two under the third, and the last two under the fifth. The second and fourth sections are suspended on pivot joints. The distances between the successive bogies are 5,200, 8,400, 5,600, 8,400, and 5,200 mm.

The bogies are equipped with classic wheelsets with 650 mm diameter wheels, a bolster beam, and two stages of suspension. The first stage consists of inclined stacks of metal-rubber and wheels, while the second stage consists of coil springs and hydraulic shock absorbers. Additionally, each bogie is equipped with two 50 kW induction motors along the vehicle's axis. The drive to the wheelsets is transmitted via a drive shaft with universal joints and an angular transmission.

=== Drive and brake system ===
In the 405N tram, electric power is drawn from the network using two current collectors mounted on the roof of the first and third sections. This power is then converted by IGBT inverters mounted under the bodies of the first, third, and fifth sections. Each of these devices controls two traction motors, handling both acceleration and braking functions. The entire tram is equipped with 12 STDa 200L4A type motors, with a total power output of 600 kW. These motors are grouped, and their operation in the appropriate configurations allows the required tractive force and braking parameters to be achieved. Additionally, one voltage converter is installed on the roof of the first and fifth sections each, to power the 24 V DC and 230 V AC circuits.

Primary braking is achieved through dynamic braking with the traction motors, controlled by the inverter system. The electrical connection system used in the vehicle allows part of the energy generated during braking to be returned to the network when the traction motors operate in generator mode, while the rest is directed to a resistor system. Additionally, the tram is equipped with drum and track mechanical brakes, an anti-lock braking system, and sandboxes.

== Operation ==
Country	City	Operation	From	To	Sources
Poland	Wrocław	Testing	19 January 2012	1 March 2012	
Poland	Kraków	Testing	2 March 2012	19 April 2012	
Poland	Kraków	Line service	20 April 2012		

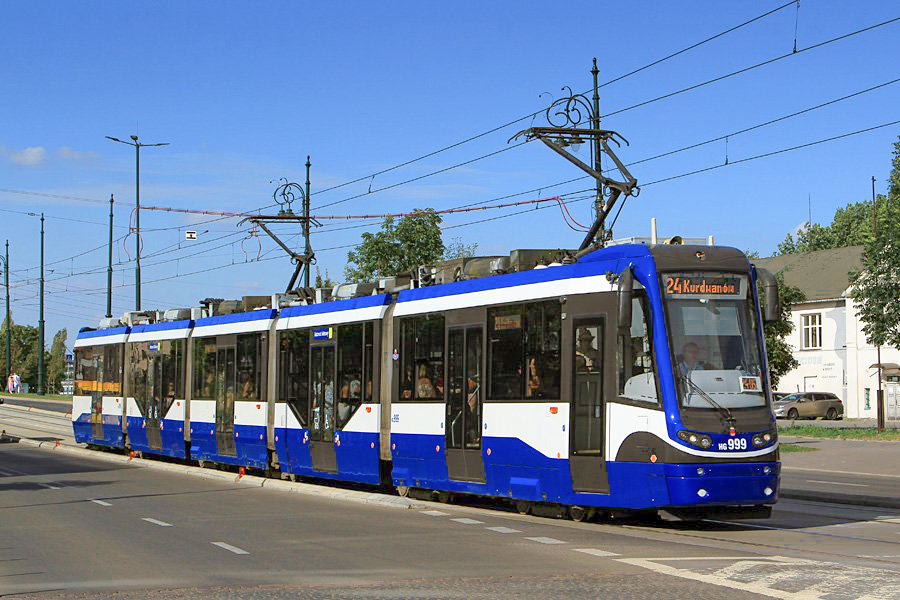
The tram in new colors of Kraków (2016)

On 19 January 2012, the first test run of the 405N tram took place in Wrocław. It was announced that the tram would enter line service in February, but a second trial run was organized in Wrocław on February 3. Ultimately, the tram was delivered to Kraków on the night of March 1/2 in two parts, transported on trailers. After unloading, the parts were assembled, and the tram traveled under its own power from Podgórze to the Nowa Huta depot, where it is based. Tests and training for MPK staff took place in Kraków, and on 20 April 2012, the tram began scheduled operation on line 1. After a few days, it was assigned to line 50, and later to its target line, number 4.

Initially, the tram was numbered 4001. From June 2015, when MPK Kraków introduced a new tram numbering system, the vehicle was designated HX999. At the end of July 2016, the tram received a paint scheme consistent with the visual identification guide for Kraków public transport vehicles and was renumbered HG999.
