= Trams in Kraków =

Tram network in Kraków, Poland

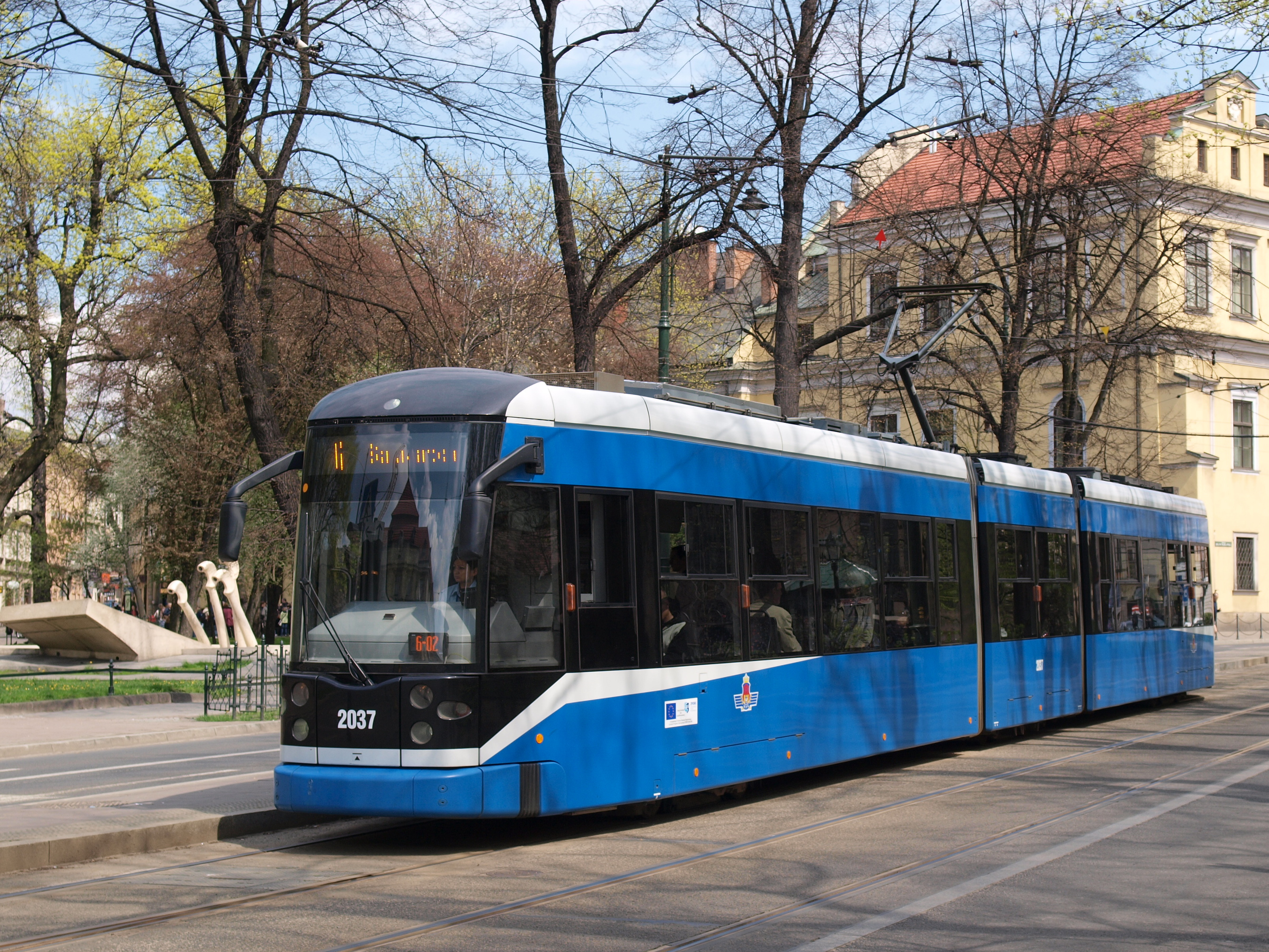
- Tram type NGT6-2

Operation
- Locale: Kraków, Poland
- Open: 1882
- Lines: 25
- Operator: MPK Kraków

Infrastructure
- Track gauge: 900 mm (2 ft 11 7/16 in) (Since The Electrification in 1902, Closed in 1953); 1,435 mm (4 ft 8 1/2 in) (Since 1913)
- Propulsion system: Electricity
- Electrification: 600 V DC overhead line

Statistics
- Route length: 90.0 km (55.9 mi)

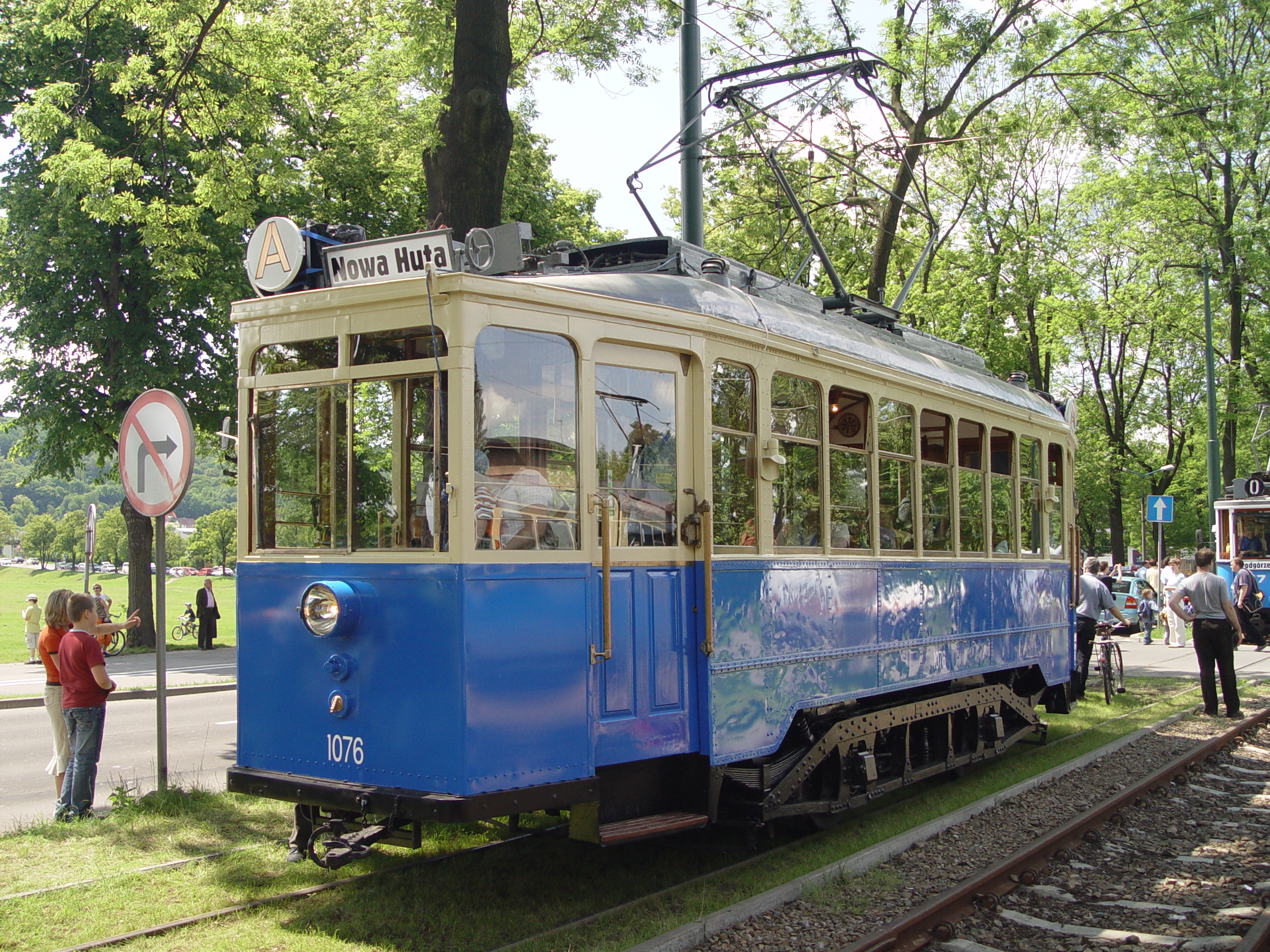
Preserved Linke-Hofmann-Busch tram, Kraków, Poland

The Kraków tram system is a tram system in Kraków, Poland. The tramway has been in operation since 1882, and is currently operated by Miejskie Przedsiębiorstwo Komunikacyjne w Krakowie (MPK Kraków). There are 22 ordinary, 2 fast, and 3 night tram lines with a total line length of 347 kilometres (216 mi). As of 2013, the total route length of the tramway was 90 kilometres (56 mi), including a 1.4-kilometre (0.87 mi) tram tunnel with two underground stops.

== History ==
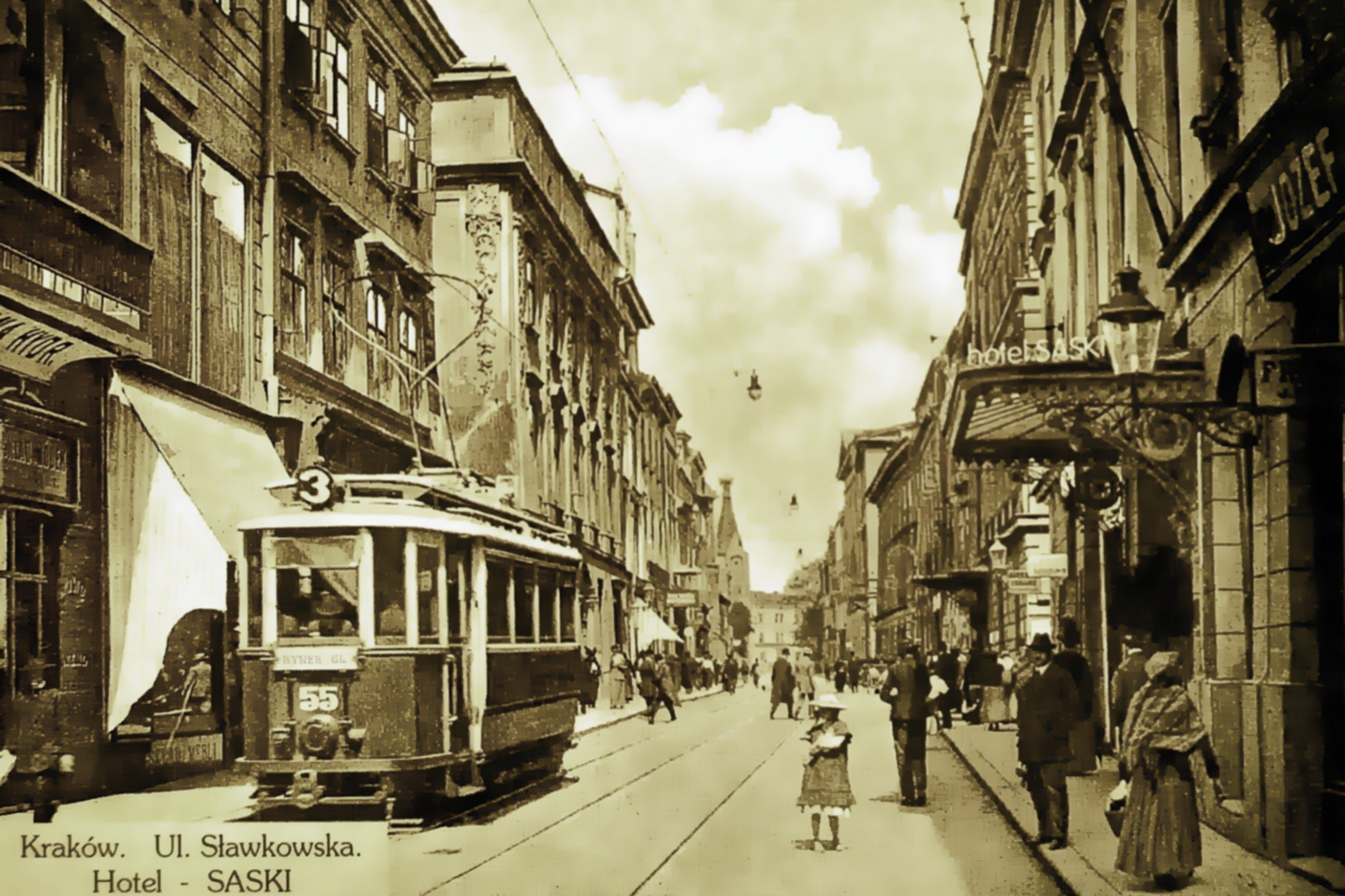
SN1 tram in Kraków in 1914

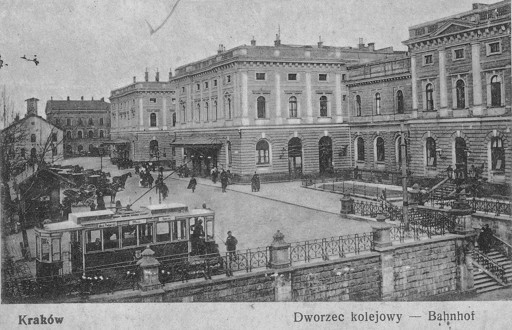
SW1 tram near Kraków Main Station in 1916

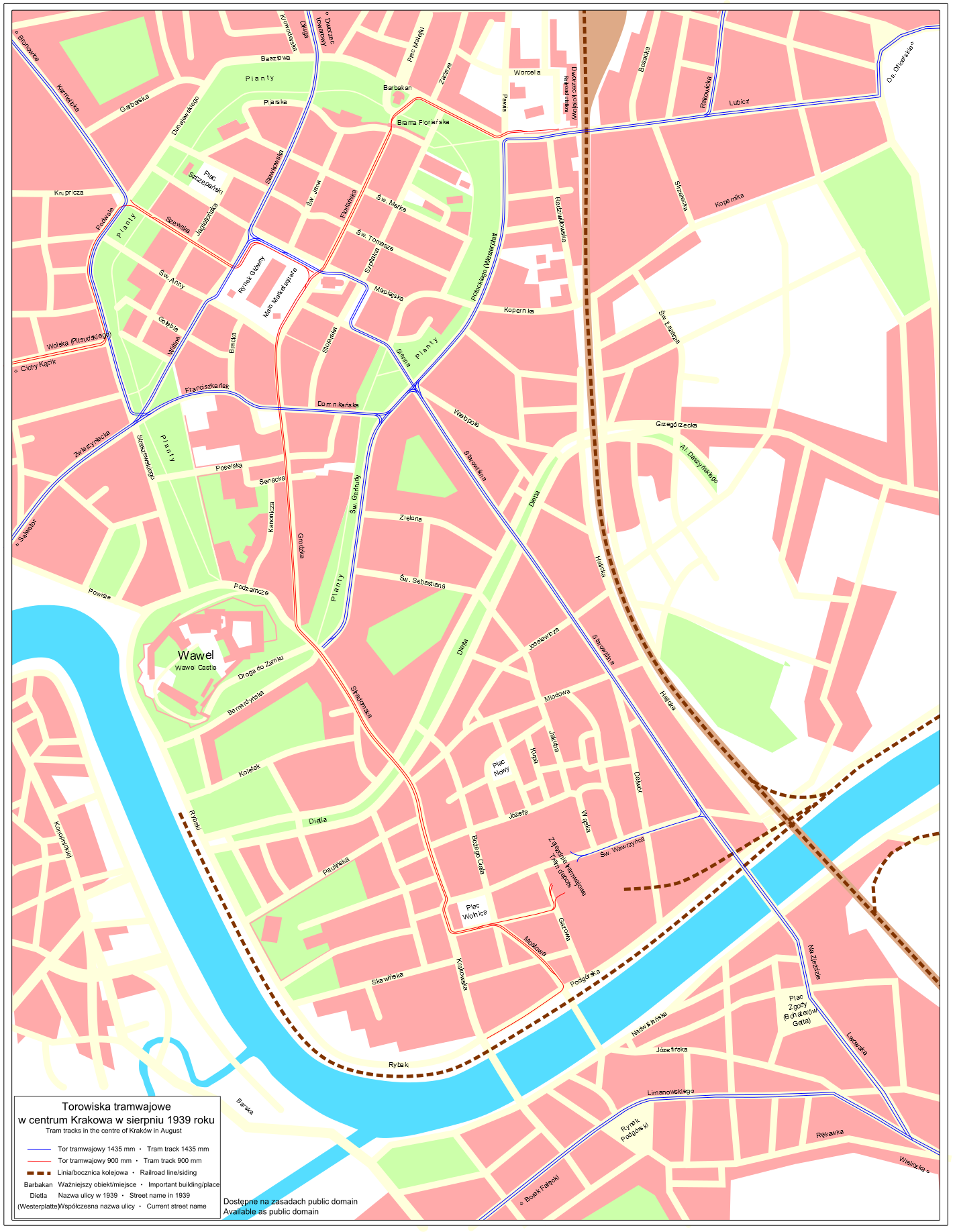
Tram network in downtown Kraków, August 1939; partially different from today

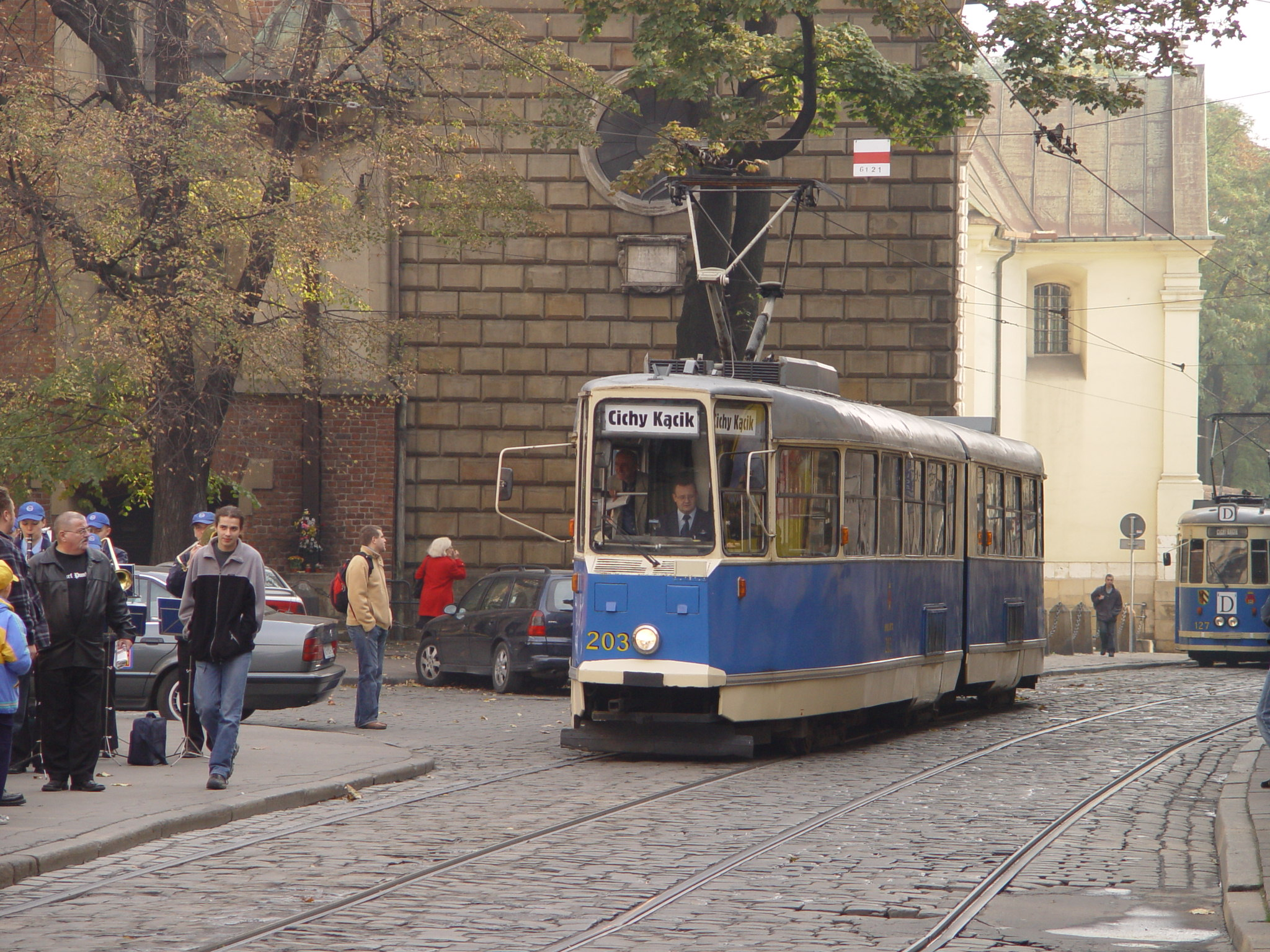
Historic Konstal 102N tram in Old Town.

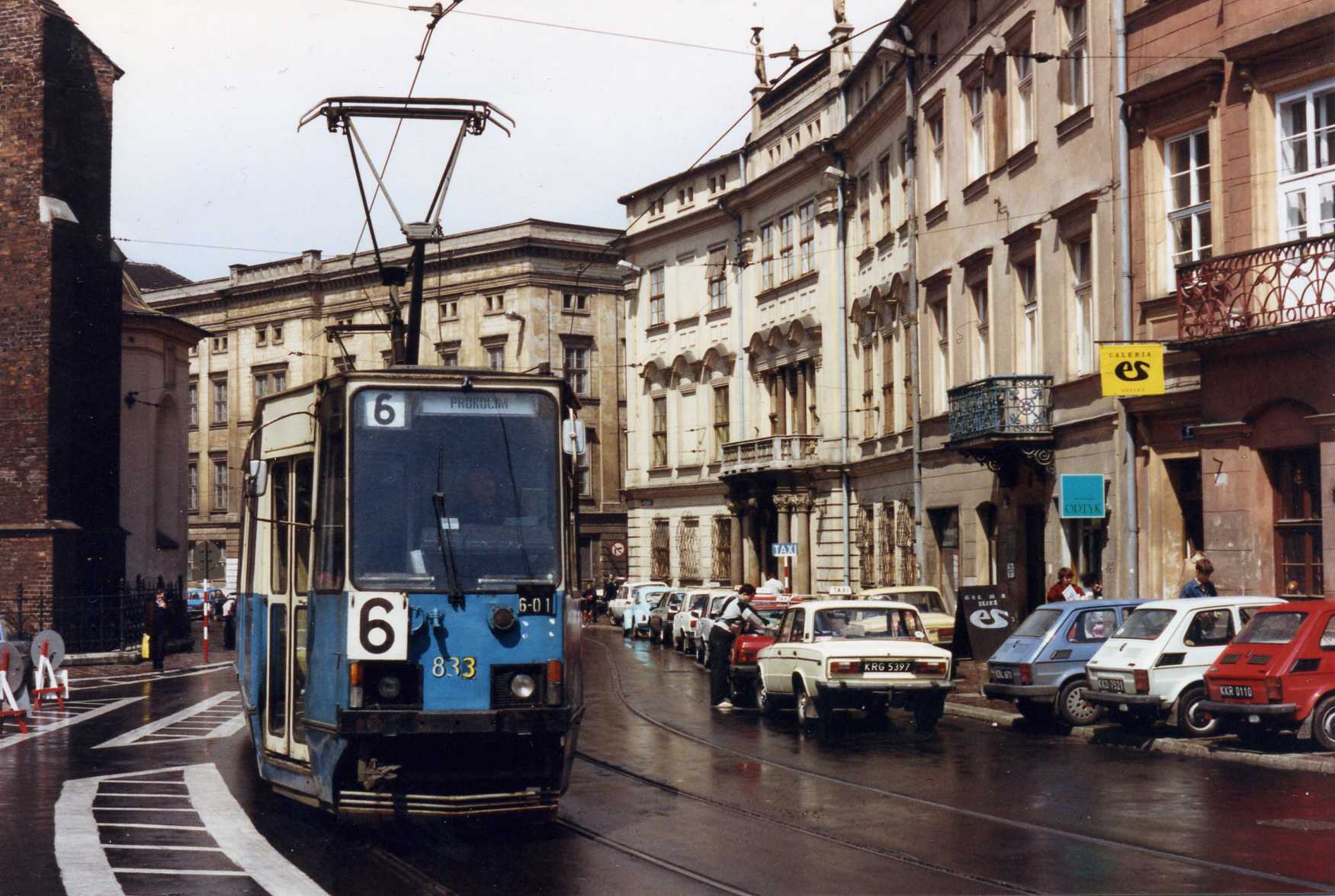
Konstal 105Na in Kraków in 1991

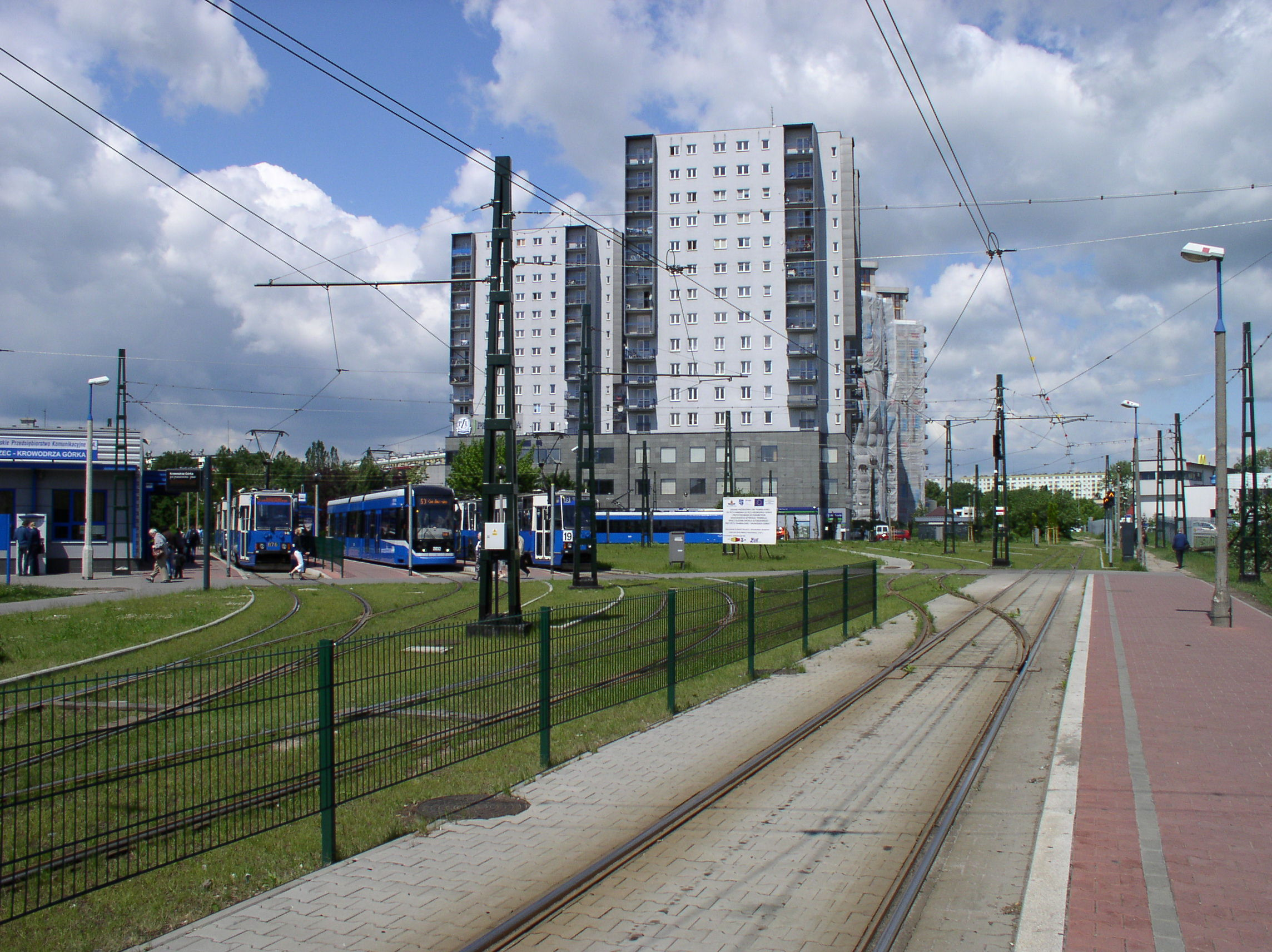
Krowodrza Górka balloon loop with MPK terminal.

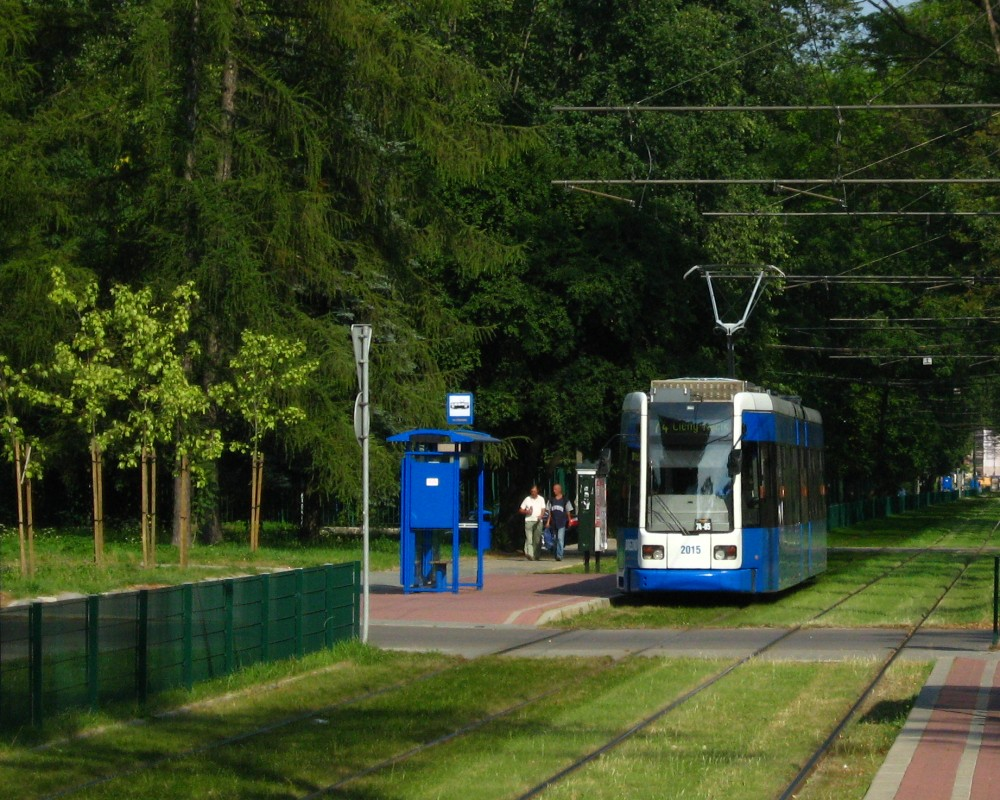
Bombardier NGT6 in Kraków

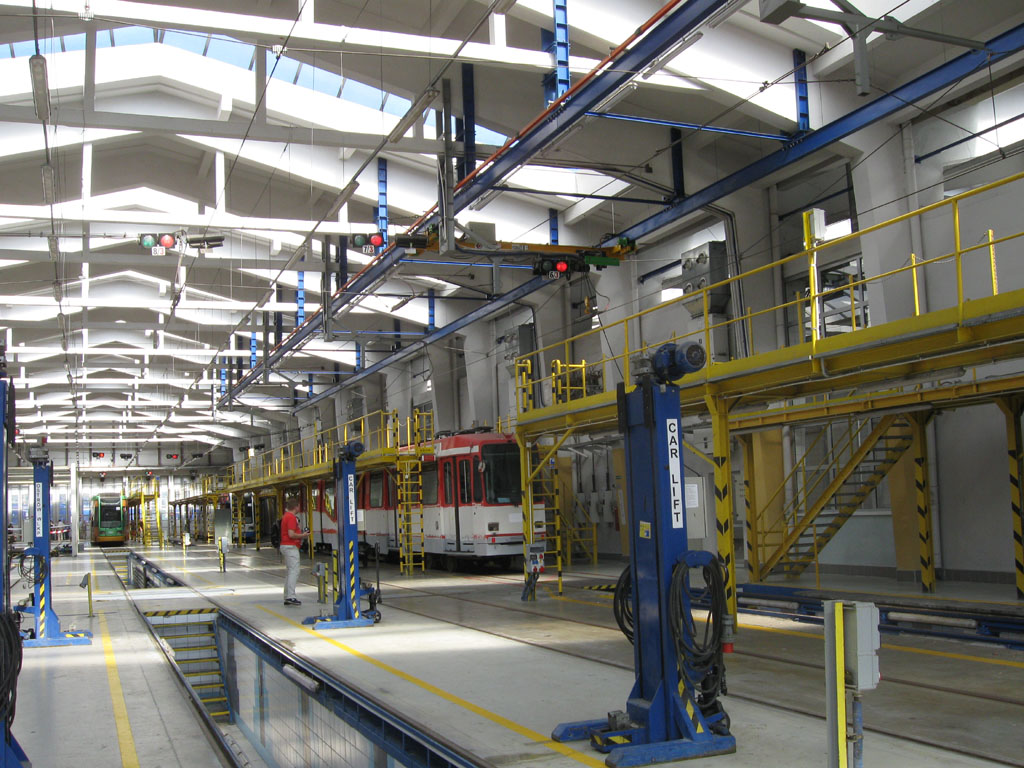
The interior of Podgórze tram depot

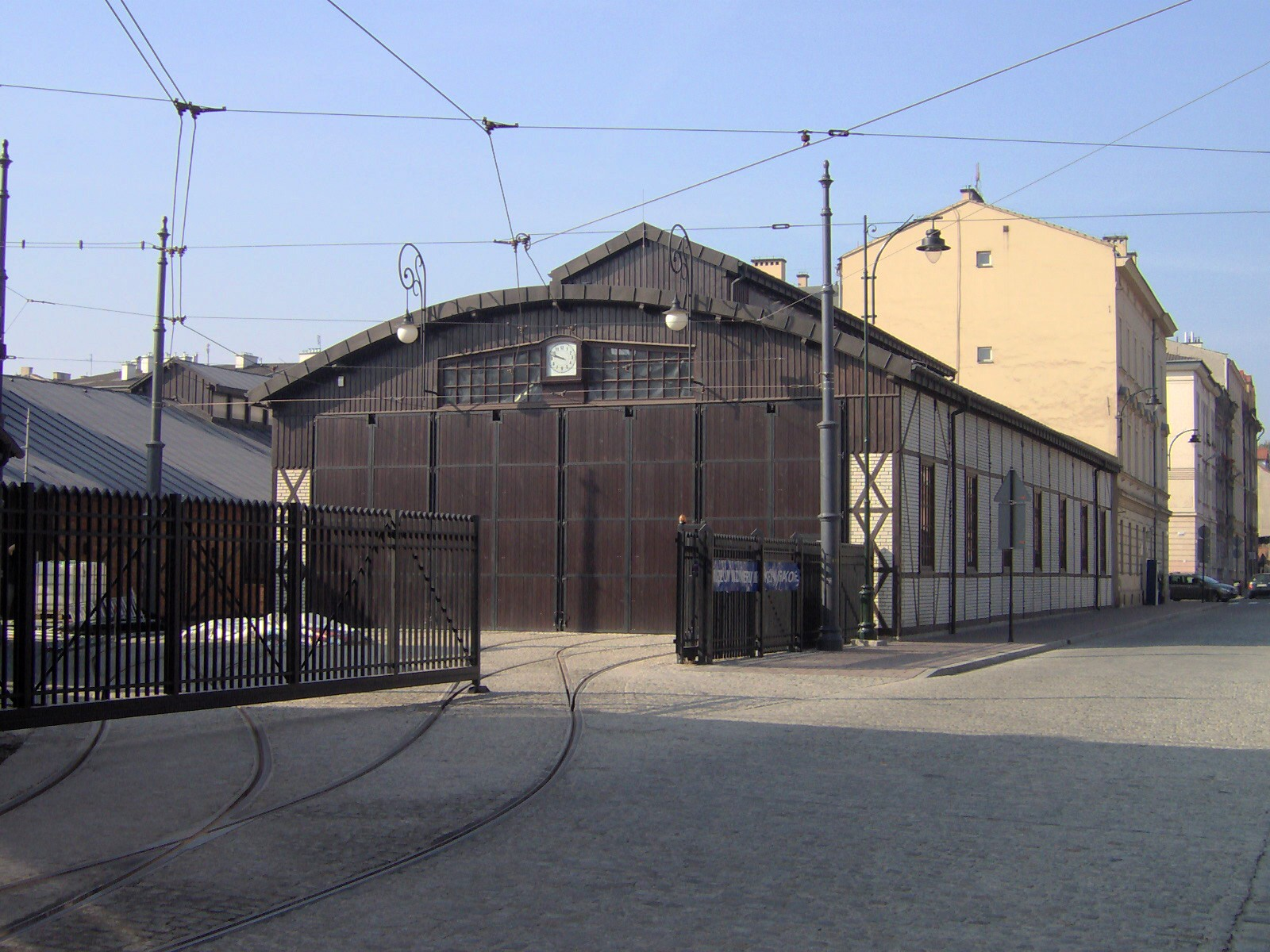
Św. Wawrzyńca tram depot, and the Museum of Municipal Engineering in Kraków (Muzeum Inżynierii Miejskiej w Krakowie)

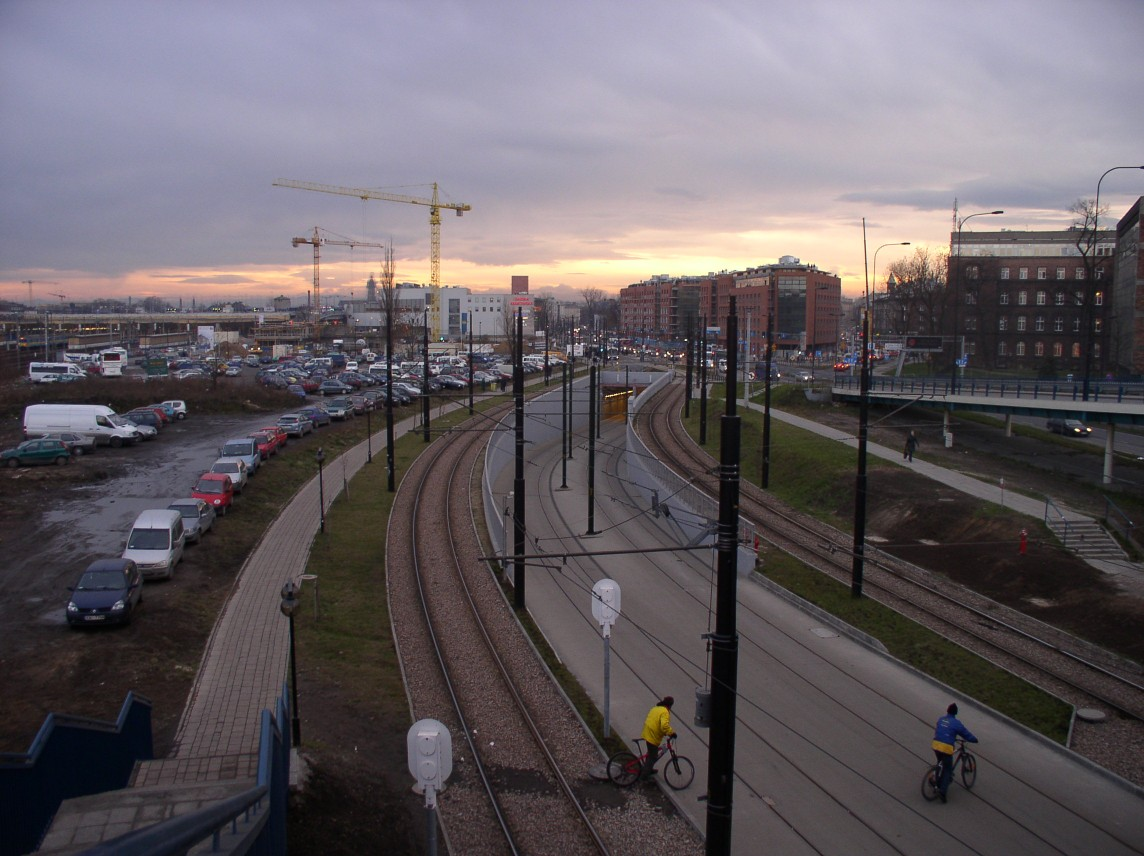
The northern end of the Fast Tram tunnel.

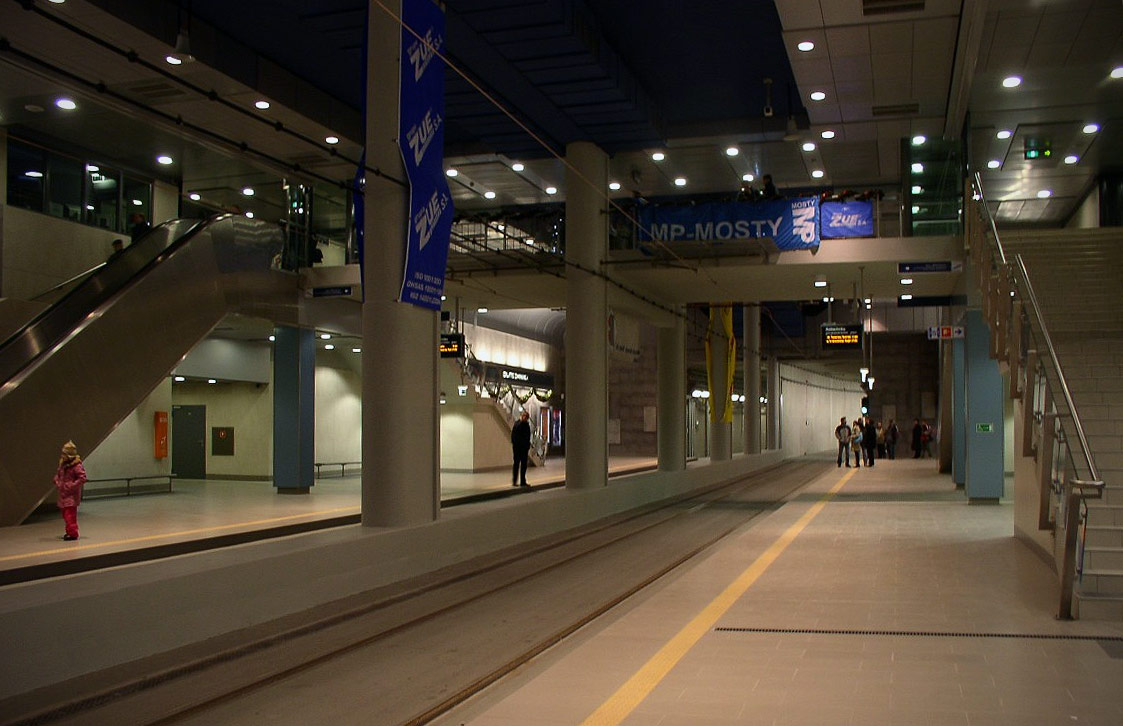
The underground stop Politechnika.

=== Origins ===
The first horse tram, 2.8 kilometres (1.7 mi) line was opened in 1882. It used narrow gauge tracks (900 mm) and ran from the railway station to Podgórski bridge. It was financed, constructed and operated by National Bank of Belgium. In 1901 the tram network was electrified and the formal opening of the first line took place on 16 March. The new SW1 class cars were produced by Sanocka Fabryka Wagonów. At the end of 1902, the system consisted of five electrified, narrow gauge lines. However, the network owners were primarily interested in the income generated by the existing lines, not in building new ones, which caused conflicts between them and the city council. The electrification and network extension was forced thanks to the Austro-Hungarian law changes favourable to the city. It stated that a railroad or a tram line could be operated only by a local company, registered in Austria. The private owners from Belgium were forced to create such a company, named Krakowska Spółka Tramwajowa, and transferred the agreement with the city to it. This took place in 1898.

Eventually, Kraków managed to buy 95% of shares of Krakowska Spółka Tramwajowa in 1910. In the same year, the city greatly increased in size by including several neighbouring villages and former military areas. New districts were created and it became clear that the narrow gauge network was not able to cope with the increasing transport needs. It was decided that a new network with standard gauge tracks will be constructed from scratch. In January 1913 the first standard gauge line (number 6) was opened, which ran from Zwierzyniecka Street, through Starowiślna to Trzeci Most. It operated SN1 class cars, also produced in Sanok. Before the world war, the new network replaced some of the narrow gauge tracks in the city centre.

=== Interwar and World War II period ===
In 1918, Poland gained independence from Germany, Austria and Russia. Kraków became one of the major cities of the newly formed country. One of the remnants from the Austrian regime was left-hand traffic. In the tram network, it was eventually abandoned in 1925. In addition to that, the supply limitations in the war period and the lack of qualified engineers caused great damage to the rolling stock quality. Unstable country economy made almost impossible to improve the situation in the first years of Polish independence. Eventually, the city government managed to establish a new tram company, Krakowska Miejska Kolej Elektryczna between 1924 and 1929.

The successful transformation allowed to repair the entire rolling stock and extend the network to the new districts, including Os. Oficerskie, Bronowice and Rakowice. The increasing number of cars created a need to build a new tram depot, since the old buildings in Kazimierz district turned out to be too small. In 1928, the city council offered a terrain for the new depot in Podgórze district. The construction began in 1937 and finished a year later. The further plans to extend the network were stopped by the war.

In the late 1920s it became clear that the construction of the new tracks to many districts would take several years. As a temporary solution, KMKE opened a bus communication. The buses were not supposed to compete with trams, and operated only on routes where the trams were expected to be introduced in the future.

Kraków survived the Nazi Invasion in 1939 relatively undamaged. Due to the confiscation of all the buses and private cars by the army, the tram became the only means of transport in the occupied city. The new German government noticed the problem and imported 10 second-hand MAN Tw cars from Nuremberg and four others from the liquidated network in Eberswalde. Another movement was the introduction of lines for Germans only.

=== Post-war period ===
After the war, Kraków tram network suffered from the lack of tram cars. Furthermore, due to destruction of bridges on Vistula river, the network was split in two parts between 1945 and 1946. In 1950 and 1952 the tram tracks reached Borek Fałęcki and the new city district, Nowa Huta, founded four years later together with a steel mill to the east from the city centre. In 1953, a tram ring around the Old Town was finished. It allowed to close down the old, narrow gauge network on 1 January 1954 and remove tracks from the Market square. In the next years, the new tracks were opened mostly in Nowa Huta and Podgórze. In 1969, a new tram depot in Nowa Huta was finished, after four years of construction. The old depot in Kazimierz was abandoned and adapted for other purposes.

After the nationalisation of Polish industry, the new communist government began construction of the national tram cars in Konstal factory, Chorzów. The first Konstal N cars appeared in Kraków in the late 1940s. SN1 and even old Tw cars from Nuremberg (known as SN3 in Kraków) remained in service to the late 60s.

In the 1970s, the local authorities began an ambitious project of reorganising the entire public transport in the city. Some of the goals were:

- Building a Metro (rapid transit) line from Bronowice to Nowa Huta.
- Rebuilding the main railway station to Kraków Communication Centre with integrated railway, bus, metro and tram services.
- Closing some tram tracks in the city centre.
- Building new tram tracks to the outer districts and a new tram depot.

Due to the lack of funding, very little was actually achieved. Between 1974 and 1990, only a single metro station was finished under the railway station. In 1984, the first network extension to the north took place - the tracks reached the new XXX-Lecia district (currently Krowodrza Górka). Despite the crisis, the authorities decided to close down the tracks to Dworzec Główny Wschód (Railway Station East) as a preparation for the next part of the metro construction. The new balloon loop in Krowodrza Górka was also prepared for the further network extensions, but the actual works never started.

=== Present times ===
Kraków tram network today

The government and economy changes caused the old plans to be abandoned. In 1994, the new authorities decided not to continue the metro line construction in favour of a fast tram. The first line was accepted to connect Krowodrza Górka in the north, with Kurdwanów in the south of the city, and use the existing tunnel under the railway station. The first stage of the tram tunnel construction took place between 1996 and 1999, from the railway station to Rondo Mogilskie. At the same time, the tram network operator, MPK Kraków, began a process of replacing the old and unreliable Konstal cars. In 1989 it began to buy second-hand T4 cars with B4 trailers from Nuremberg, and later - GT6. In 1999, it managed to buy the first twelve low-floor Bombardier NGT6 cars.

In 1999 the first network extension since 1984 took place. The tracks reached Kurdwanów district, forming the first part of the Kraków Fast Tram network. The local authorities began a huge programme of tram infrastructure modernisation. Between 2000 and 2010, nearly a quarter of the network went under a general reconstruction. In 2006 and 2007, Dworzec Towarowy was connected with an existing network through a new link on Pawia Street and the total network length reached 84 kilometres (52 mi). On 11 December 2008, the 1.4-kilometre (0.87 mi)-long tram tunnel was eventually opened after 34 years of construction. Next day, the first fast tram line 50 began to operate.

Krakow trams at Starowiślna tram stop on 14 January 2020

=== Future ===
Planned development of tram network in Kraków

Tramway is the primary form of public transport in Kraków. Many further network extensions are planned for the future. In 2010, the construction of the new link to Płaszów district began, and another one to Ruczaj was opened in 2012. Other existing tracks are going to be updated to the fast tram standards.

== Infrastructure ==
Today, the tram network consists of 90 kilometres (56 mi) of double track. Since the network is designed to be operated by single-ended trams, it has balloon loops at nearly all termini. There are currently 24 balloon loops in Kraków.

Name	Schemat	Opening Year	Tracks	Lines	Photo
Borek Fałęcki		1950	3	8, 19, 22, 50	
Bronowice		1937	2	13, 14	
Bronowice Małe		1975	2	4, 8, 24, 64	
Cichy Kącik		1902	2	6, 20	
Cmentarz Rakowicki		1934	1	2	
Czerwone Maki P+R		2012	2	11, 17, 18, 52, 62	
Dworzec Towarowy		1907	5	17, 19	
Górka Narodowa P+R		2024	3	18, 50, 69, 75	
Kopiec Wandy		1977	2	21, 22	
Krowodrza Górka P+R		1984	2	3, 5	
Kurdwanów P+R		2000	2	10, 24, 50	
Łagiewniki		1938	3	–	
Mały Płaszów P+R		2010	2	11, 20, 6	
Mistrzejowice		1974	2	14, 16	
Nowy Bieżanów P+R		1978	2	3, 9, 13, 49, 69	
Osiedle Piastów		1976	2	21, 52, 64	
Plac Centralny		1957	1	62	
Pleszów		1962	2	10, 21	
Salwator		1917	2	1, 2	
Wieczysta		1964	2	49	
Wzgórza Krzesławickie		1968	2	1, 4, 5	

=== Other termini ===
A double track wye was located in Dworcowa street which was occasionally used as an emergency terminus (usually when tracks to Kurdwanów and Bieżanów Nowy are blocked or they are cut off from the rest of the network for a longer time). This now has limited access to the network, as some of the points leading to it have been removed. A junction to Św. Wawrzyńca depot on Dajwór street sometimes serves as a wye too.

In the past, Kraków network had some termini with simple stub-ends operated by double-ended cars (eg. a narrow gauge terminus near the main railway station). After the war, they have been abandoned in favour of balloon loops, as the deliveries of single-ended trams proceeded. However, in 2006 MPK bought a small fleet of second-hand double-ended cars from Nuremberg and Düsseldorf which are used during reconstructions and partial openings of unfinished network extensions. The first temporary stub-end appeared in 2006 at Politechnika stop, when the new tracks on Pawia street had not been connected yet to the Dworzec Towarowy terminus.

Small stub-ends also exist at Krowodrza Górka, Bronowice Male and Salwator termini, but they are used as spare tracks for defected and replacement cars, while double-ended trams use the balloon loop.

=== Tram depots ===
There are three tram depots in Kraków:

- Zajezdnia Podgórze (opened in 1938)
- Zajezdnia Nowa Huta (opened in 1969)
- Zajezdnia Św. Wawrzyńca (opened in 1882, reopened in 2009)

The last tram depot was reconstructed in 2008 and serves as a tram museum.

=== Kraków Fast Tram ===
Kraków Fast Tram (pl. Krakowski Szybki Tramwaj) is a light rail network being developed in Kraków.

It consists of several modernised or purpose-built tram tracks with radio-controlled absolute priority on crossings, an underground, 1.4 kilometres (4,600 ft) long tunnel under Kraków Główny railway station with two underground stops and a 0.6 kilometres (2,000 ft) long overpass over Kraków Płaszów rail station. Contrary to many light rail systems, Kraków Fast Tram is not separate from regular tramway lines - the tracks are a part of the wider "classic" tramway network and are used by ordinary lines, which benefit from moving through a fast tram corridor. The stops at the fast tram tracks are equipped with an electronic passenger information system showing estimated departure times live. As of 2017, the system is installed on classic tram lines, too.

In addition to the ordinary lines, there were two 'fast tram lines' that run at up to 5 minute intervals on the fast tram tracks:

- 50 - Krowodrza Górka - Kurdwanów
- 52 - Czerwone Maki - Osiedle Piastów.

The first fast tram line was opened on 12 December 2008, more than 30 years since construction start, however due to the missing tracks through Płaszów, it temporarily used the link through Kazimierz and Podgórze districts, where short pieces of track were not in its own right-of-way but connected to the traffic light control system and passenger information system. That gap was eliminated when the light rail overpass over the rail station in Płaszów opened on 30 August 2015. The construction costs amounted to 164 million złoty, of which 67 million was covered by the European Union funds. It incorporates a tram stop with stairways and lifts to the rail platforms underneath and can be used by both pedestrians and cyclists, in addition to trams and emergency vehicles.

On 26 September 2026, Line 50 was renumbered to Line 7 and Line 52 was discontinued.

== Lines ==
List of tram routes in Kraków as of September 2026. Currently, there are 27 tram lines (24 daytime lines and 3 night lines).

Daily	all day	1, 2, 3, 4, 5, 6, 7, 8, 9, 10, 12, 13, 14, 15, 16, 20, 21, 22
Weekdays only	all day	11, 17, 18
Weekdays only	peak hours only	49
Seasonal	Temporary or Seasonal (numbered 7X)	70, 71, 75, 76, 77, 78
Nightly	Weekends & Holidays	62, 64, 69

=== Day Time Routes ===
Line	Map	Route	Frequency
1		Salwator – Wzgórza Krzesławickie	Weekdays; 15; Weekends; 20
2		Salwator – Cmentarz Rakowicki	Weekdays; 10; Weekends; 20
3		Krowodrza Górka P+R – Nowy Bieżanów P+R	Weekdays; 8 Weekends; 20
4		Bronowice Małe – Wzgórza Krzesławickie	Weekdays; 15; Weekends; 20
5		Górka Narodowa P+R – Wzgórza Krzesławickie	Weekdays; 15; Weekends; 20
6		Salwator – Mały Płaszów P+R	Weekdays; 10; Weekends; 20
7		Górka Narodowa P+R – Kurdwanów P+R	
8		Bronowice Małe – Borek Fałęcki	Weekdays; 6-10 Weekends; 20
9		Mistrzejowice – Nowy Bieżanów P+R	Weekdays; 15; Weekends; 20
10		Kurdwanów P+R – Pleszów	Weekdays; 15; Weekends; 20
11		Czerwone Maki P+R – Mały Płaszów P+R	Weekdays; 15
12		Osiedle Piastów – Czerwone Maki P+R	
13		Salwator – Nowy Bieżanów P+R	Weekdays; 15; Weekends; 20
14		Bronowice – Miśnieńska	Weekdays; 15; Weekends; 20
15		Krowodrza Górka P+R – Osiedle Piastów	
16		Dworzec Towarowy – Pleszów	Weekdays; 15; Weekends; 20
17		Czerwone Maki P+R – Dworzec Towarowy	Weekdays; 15
18		Czerwone Maki P+R – Górka Narodowa P+R	Weekdays; 15
19		Dworzec Towarowy – Borek Fałęcki	Weekdays; 15
20		Cichy Kącik – Mały Płaszów P+R	Weekdays; 8 Weekdays; 20
21		Osiedle Piastów – Bardosa	Weekdays; 15; Weekends; 20
22		Borek Fałęcki – Kopiec Wandy	Weekdays; 15; Weekends; 20
24		Bronowice Małe – Kurdwanów P+R	Weekdays; 15
49		Nowy Bieżanów P+R – Arena Krakow Wieczysta	Weekdays; 15

=== Night Time Routes ===
Line	Map	Route	Frequency
62		Czerwone Maki P+R – Plac Centralny	Weekends; 30
64		Bronowice Małe – Os. Piastów	Weekends; 30
69		Górka Narodowa P+R – Nowy Bieżanów P+R	Weekdays; 30

=== Maps ===
Permanent daytime tramlines in Kraków.

Permanent nighttime tramlines in Kraków.

== Rolling stock ==
Since 1994, MPK Kraków replaces the Polish rolling stock produced by Konstal with new, modern low floor cars and second-hand trams imported from Germany and Austria. The fleet consists of 292 motored cars and 59 trailer cars.

=== Konstal 105Na ===
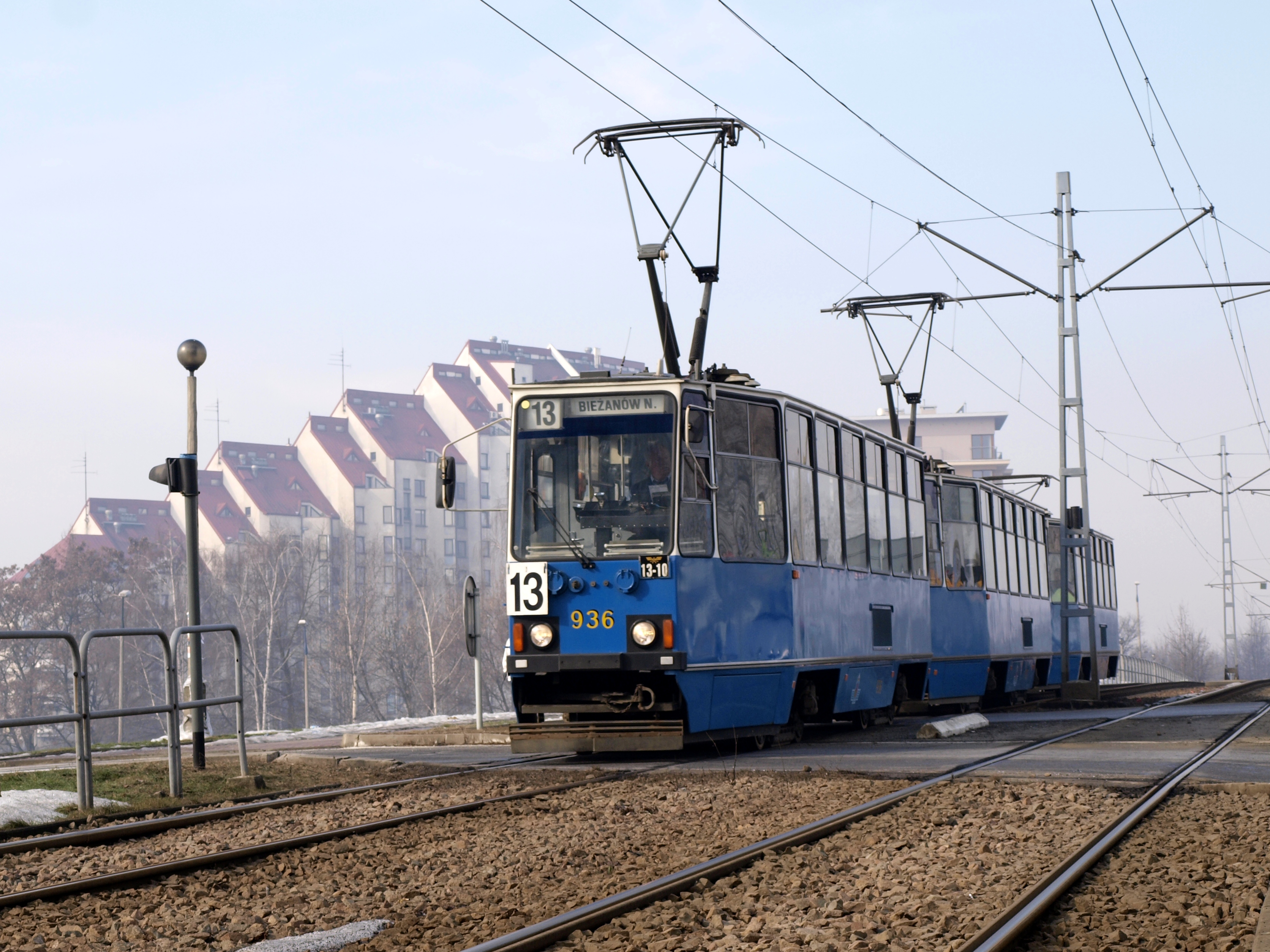
Konstal 105Na in 2010

The fleet of 32 Konstal 105 was built between 1979 and 1992. It is 13.5-metre (44 ft)-long and can form longer trains (theoretically up to five cars, in practice the two-car and three-car trains are operated). Due to the unreliability and the poor technical design, they are slowly replaced by second-hand trams from Germany.

=== Protram 405N-Kr ===
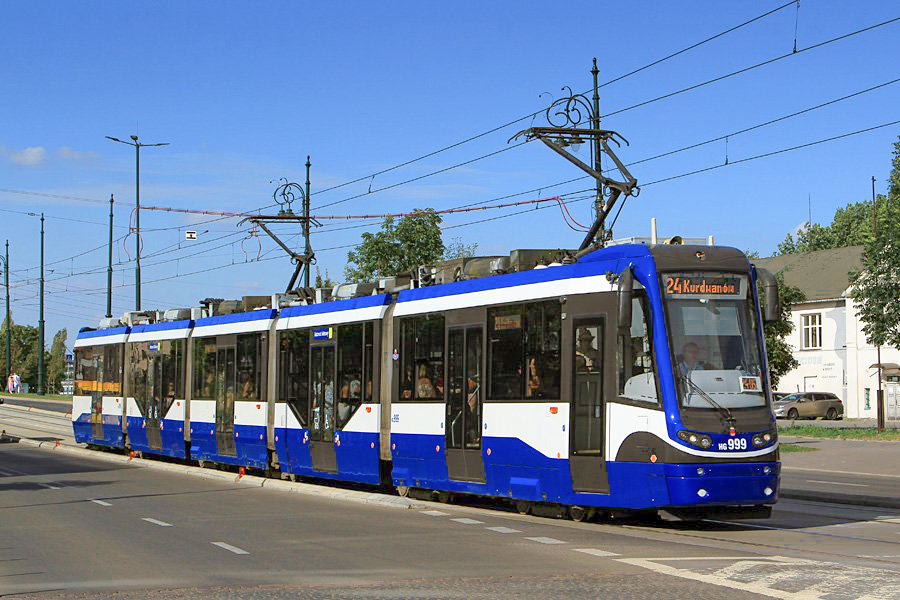
Protram 405N-Kr in 2016

The Protram 405N-Kr, manufactured between 2011 and 2012, was rebuilt from three Konstal 105Na cars which have been connected with two new low-floor sections forming a single unit. The reconstruction was performed by Protram located in Wrocław. The tram is 40.5-metre (133 ft) long and has five sections with a total percentage of low-floor area of 25%. The tram is equipped with a complete electronic passenger information system, air conditioning, and two ticket machines. It has a capacity of 364 passengers, including 64 on seats. The tram entered service on 20 April 2012. There were plans to build more trams of this type, but due to the high cost for this rebuild (up to €400,000), MPK Krakow decided to procure new 2014N trams from Pesa (Pesa Krakowiak 2014N). In 2016 the tram was repainted to match other MPK vehicles.

=== Bombardier NGT6 ===
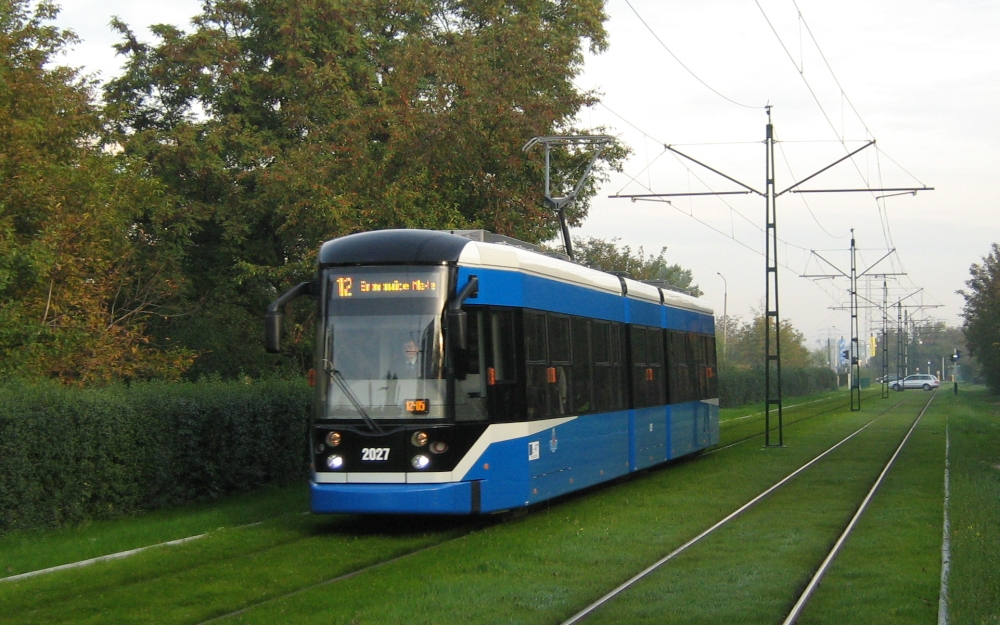
NGT6-2 in October 2007

14 Bombardier NGT6 were built between 1998 and 1999, with a further 36 units constructed from 2001 until 2007. The second batch units are referred to as NGT6-2.

The first order for 12 trams was placed in 1998, followed up with an order for another 12 in 2001. Further 24 trams were ordered in 2006. A total of 50 NGT6 vehicles have been delivered to Krakow. The trams have an electronic passenger information system.

=== Bombardier NGT8 ===
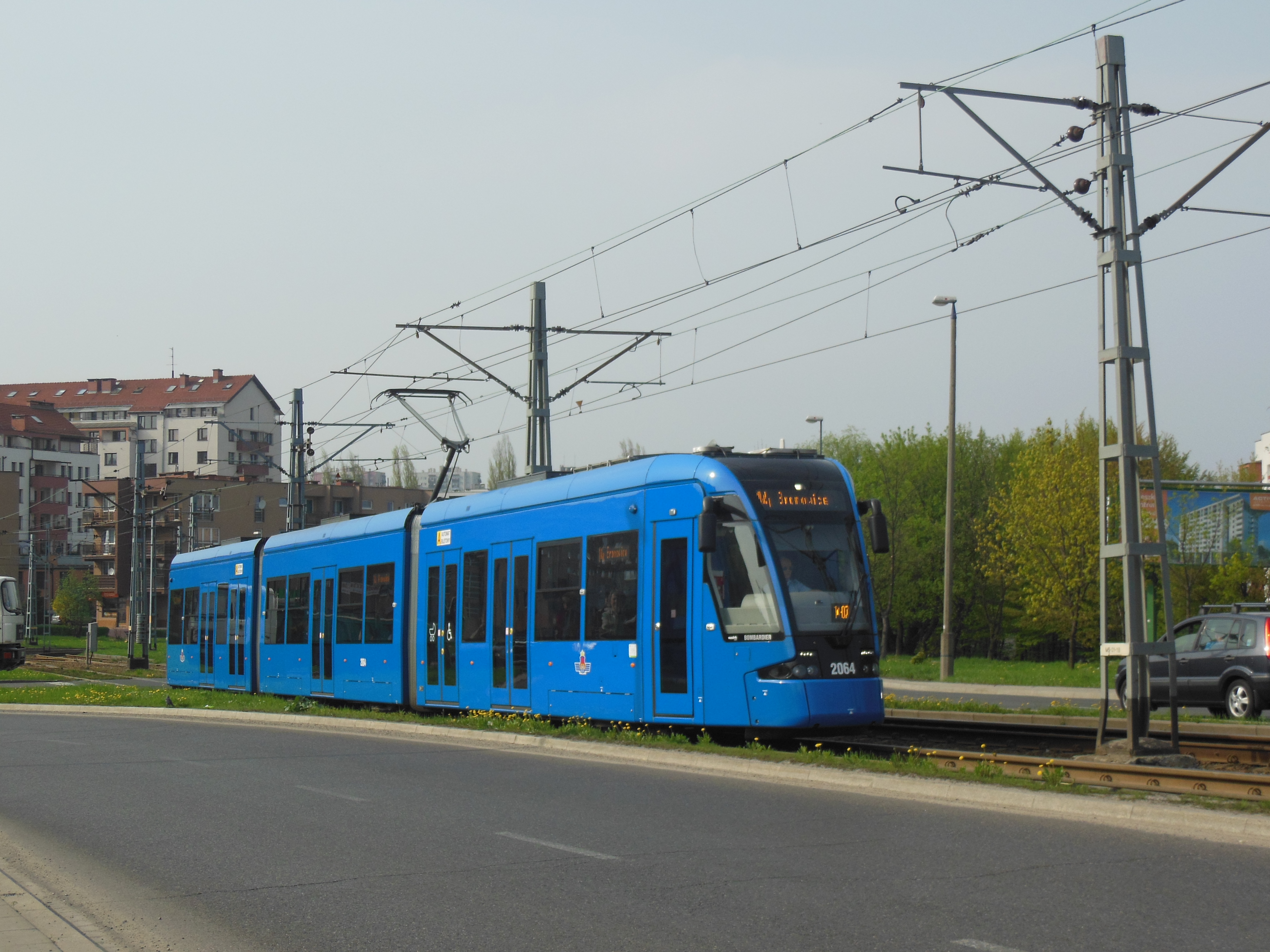
NGT8 in 2013

The NGT8 trams were ordered in June 2010. 24 Bombardier NGT8 were built between 2012 and 2014. MPK Kraków received its first NGT8 in October 2012.

=== Pesa 2014N ===
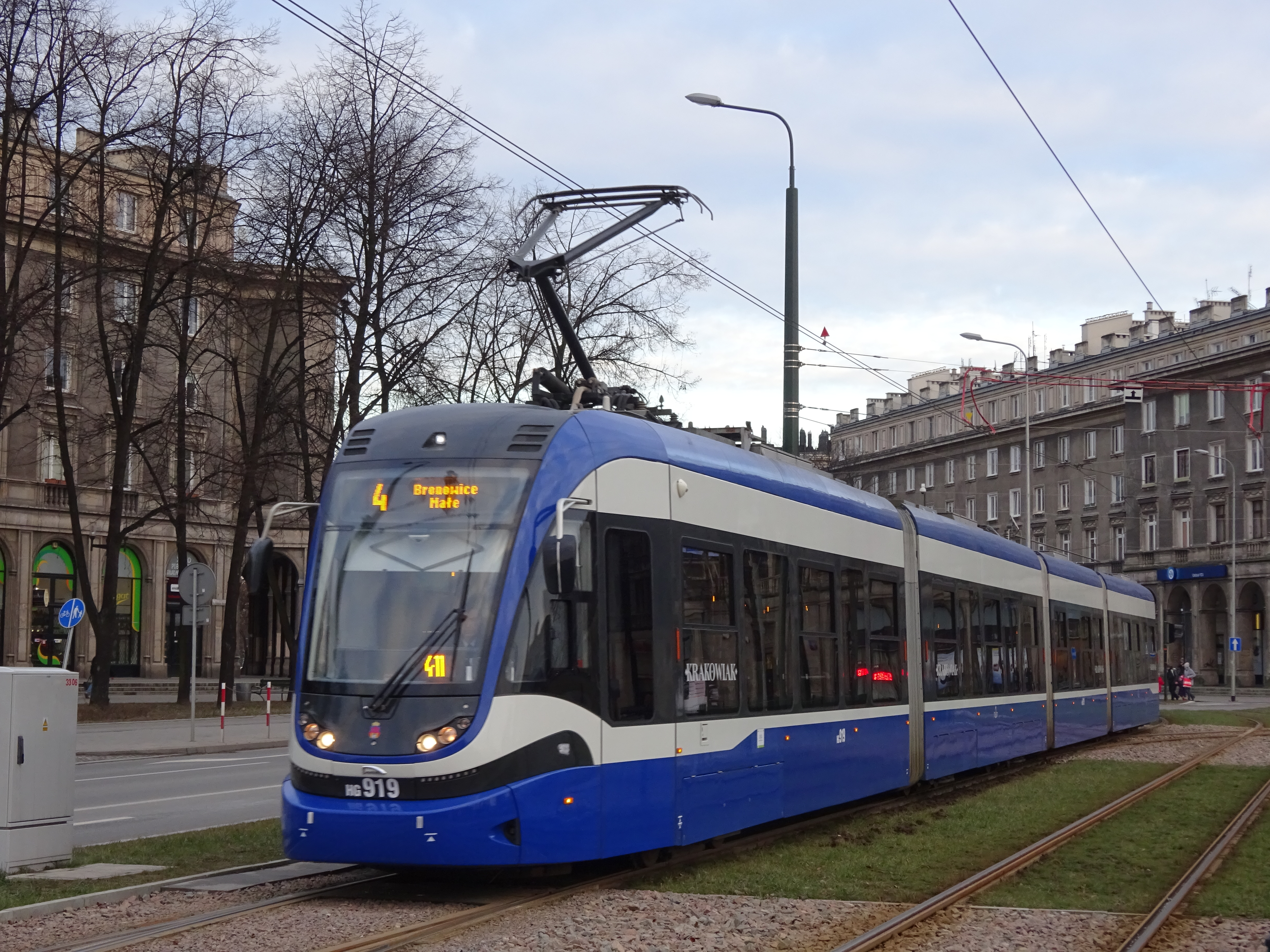
2014N "Krakowiak" in January 2016

Pesa built 36 Twist 2014N "Krakowiak" trams for MPK Krakow between 2014 and 2015. The first unit was delivered on 28 June 2015. With a length of 42.8 m (140 ft 5 in) the Pesa 2014N "Krakowiak" is the longest tram in Poland. They are equipped with air conditioning, passenger information system, ticket machines and bike stands. The first "Krakowiak" entered service on 30 August 2015.

=== Newag 126N ===
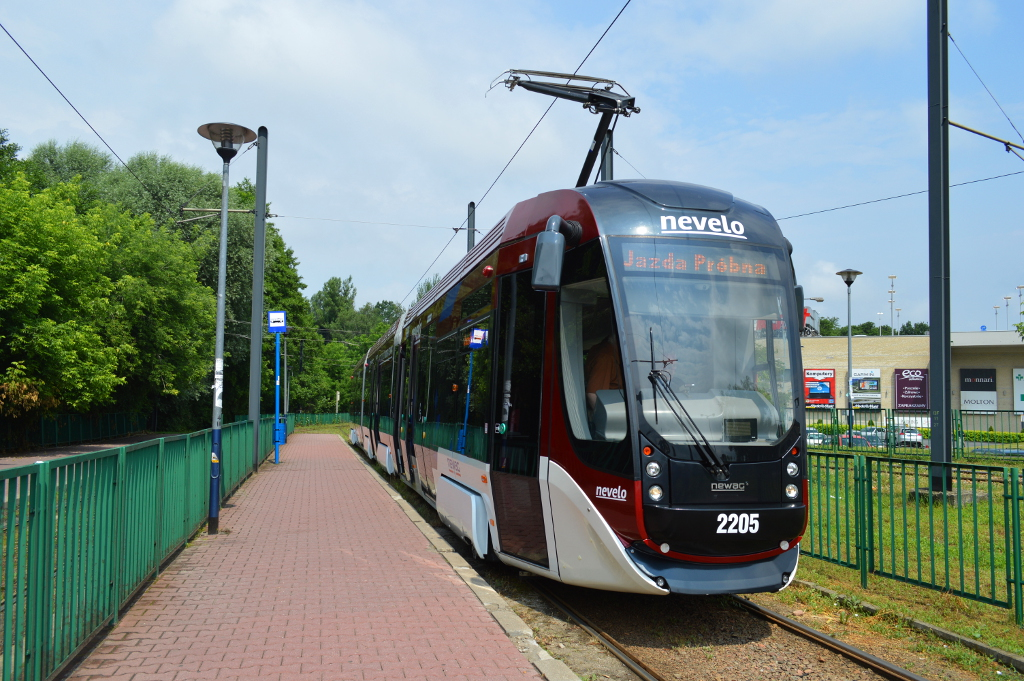
Newag 126N in June 2013

The sole Newag 126N was built in 2012 and entered trial operation in 2013.

It was then given back to the manufacturer, and returned to Krakow on 27 November 2016.

=== Düwag GT8S ===
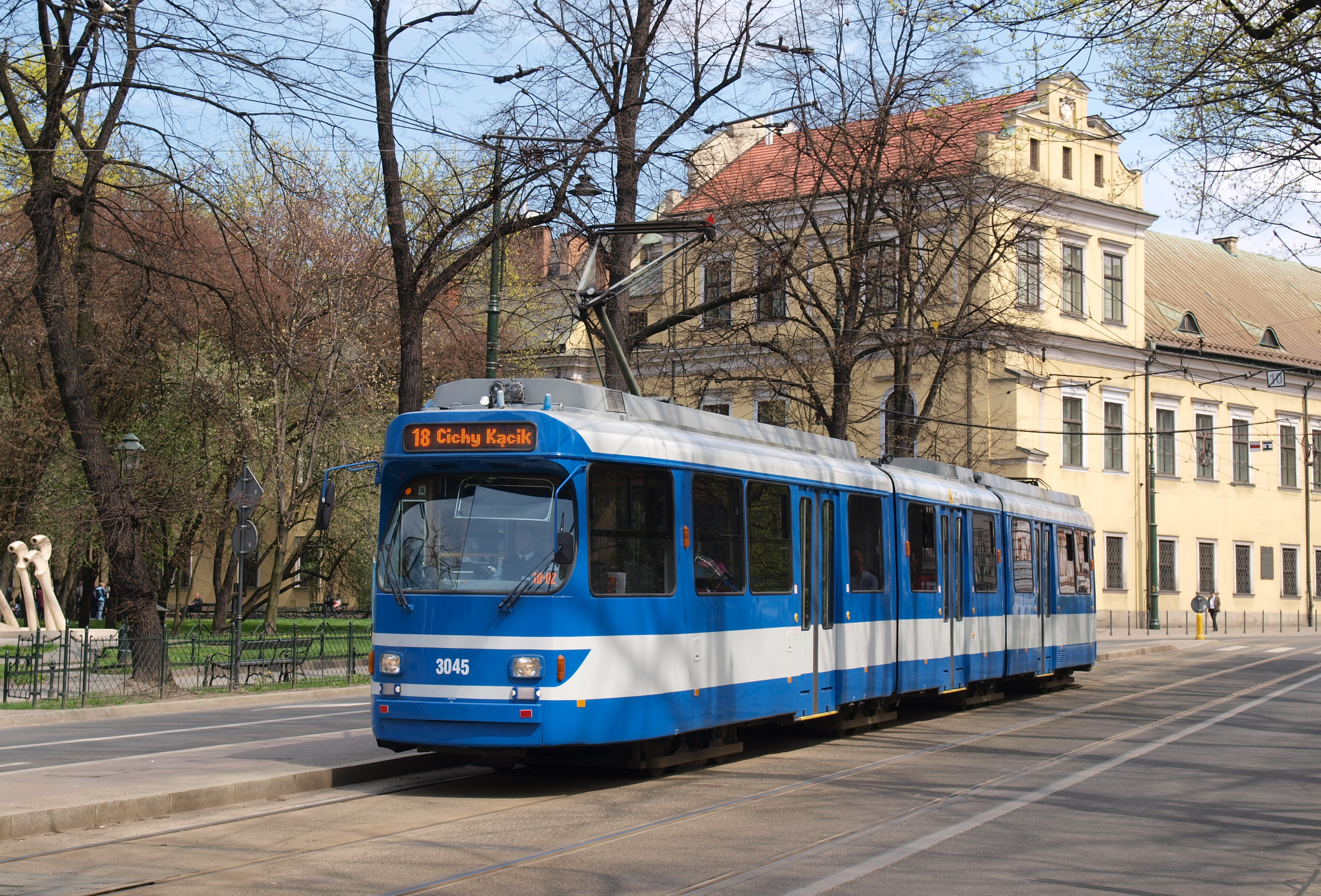
A GT8S in April 2012

14 Düwag GT8S were built between 1973 and 1976, and were formerly in service in Düsseldorf, Germany.

In September 2009 MPK Kraków bought one of the cars for testing, and decided to import a further 27 cars of this class. During the modernisation, they were equipped with an electronic passenger information system. They are retrofitted with low-floor sections. Two units have been modified, and are referred to as GT8C. The total available fleet consist out of 24 vehicles (august 2024). It is worth noting that the cars retained their own rolling stock numbers from Düsseldorf, which was later unified to Krakows standard in 2015.

=== Type GT8SU ===
Also formerly in service in Düsseldorf were the 12 GT8N trams, built between 1973 and 1976. They were refurbished by MPK Kraków and received chopper control and a low-floor section.

=== Type E1 ===
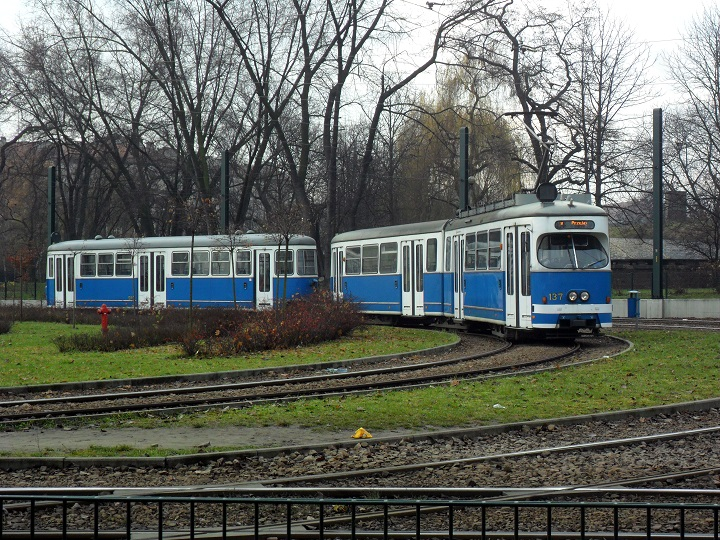
An E1 and C3 tram in November 2012

The fleet of 18 E1 trams and 10 C3 trailers was built by SGP and Lohner between 1966 and 1976. They were formerly in service in Vienna. All cars are fitted with a partial electronic passenger information system, this was part of the modernisation that MPK did on all the trams and trailers.

=== Type N8 ===
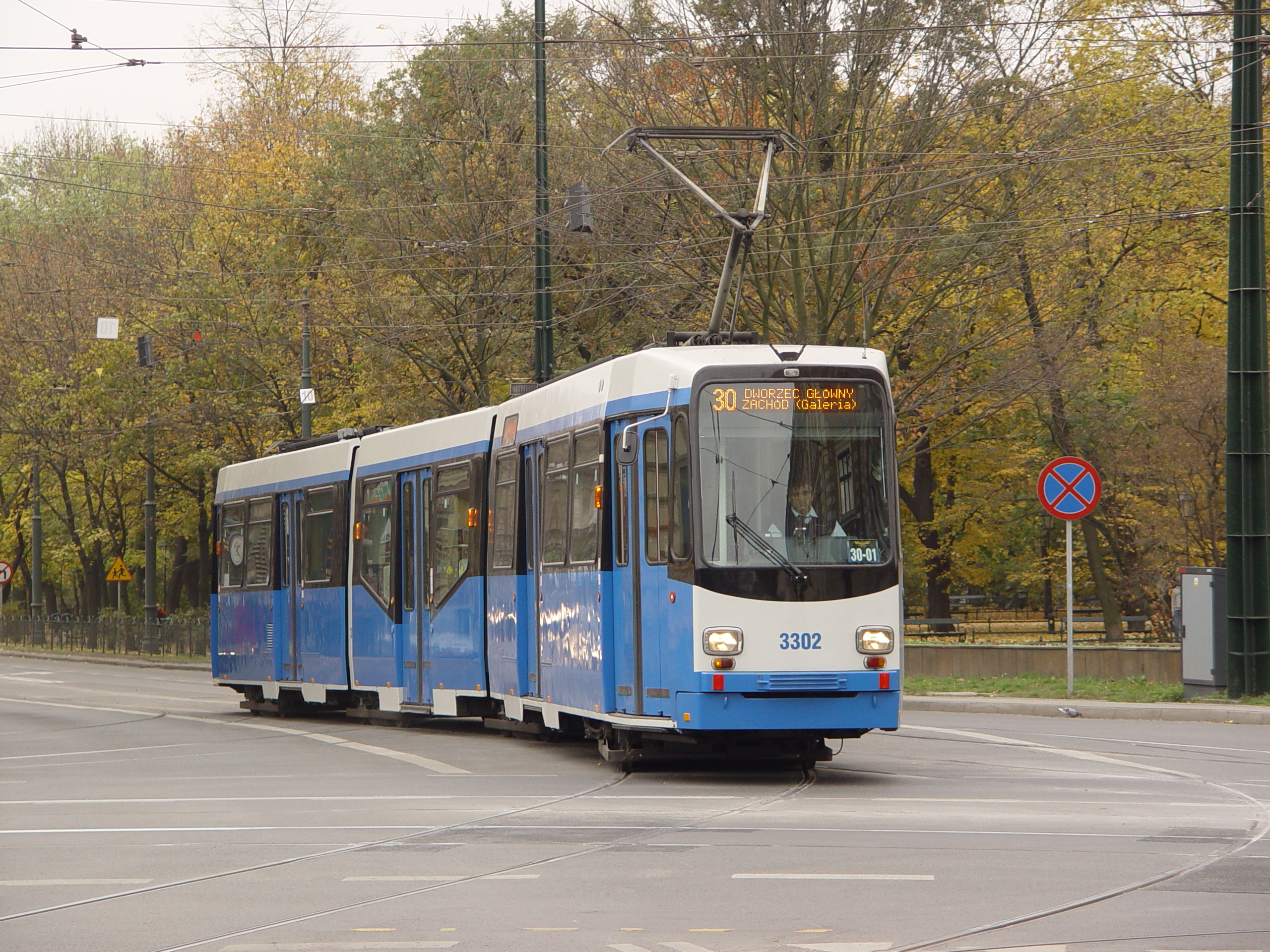
N8S-NF in October 2006

The fleet of N8 trams consists of 12 trams in total. Four ex-Nuremberg N8S-NF trams were built by MAN and Duewag in 1976 and 1977, and were retrofitted with low-floor sections in 1992 and 1993. Seven ex-Nuremberg N8C-NF trams were built by MAN and Düwag in 1976 and 1977, and were retrofitted with low-floor sections in 1992 and 1993. They were refurbished by MPK Kraków and received chopper control. One ex-Essen N8S-NF tram was built in 1975. It was refurbished by Protram and retrofitted with a low-floor section. The ex-Essen unit is a former metre-gauge M8S, bought initially for replacement parts, but later adapted to standard gauge. During the modernisation, they received an electronic passenger information system.

=== Type EU8N ===
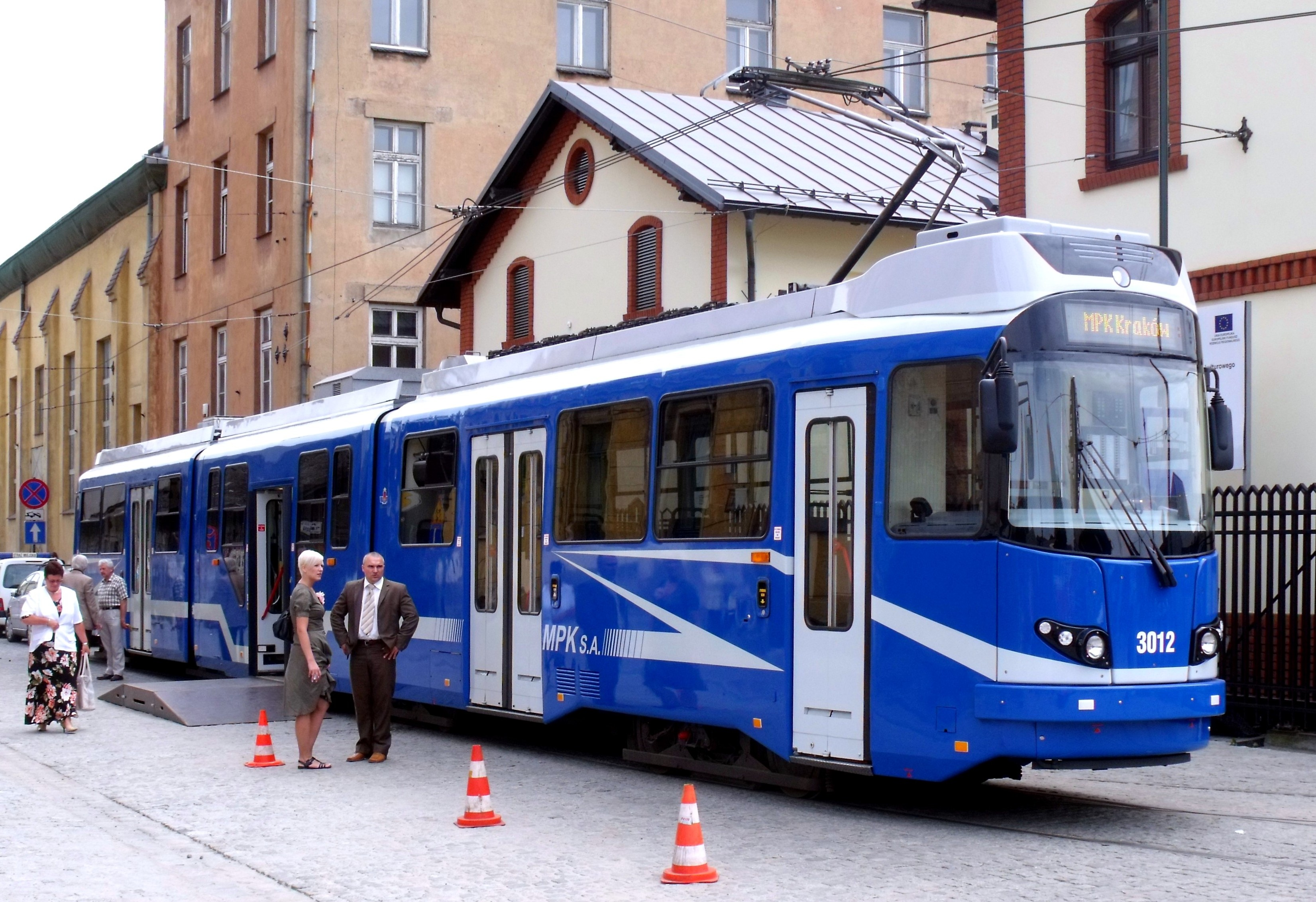
EU8N in June 2010

A total of 40 Type EU8N trams were rebuilt from E6 trams and C6 trailers formerly in service in Vienna. Reusing the bogies from C6 trailers, Autosan produced a new low-floor module which was inserted between the two sections of the E6 tram. The assembly took place at the workshop of MPK Kraków. The first rebuilt unit was rolled out in 2010. The trams also received air-conditioning and a passenger information system.

=== Stadler Lajkonik ===
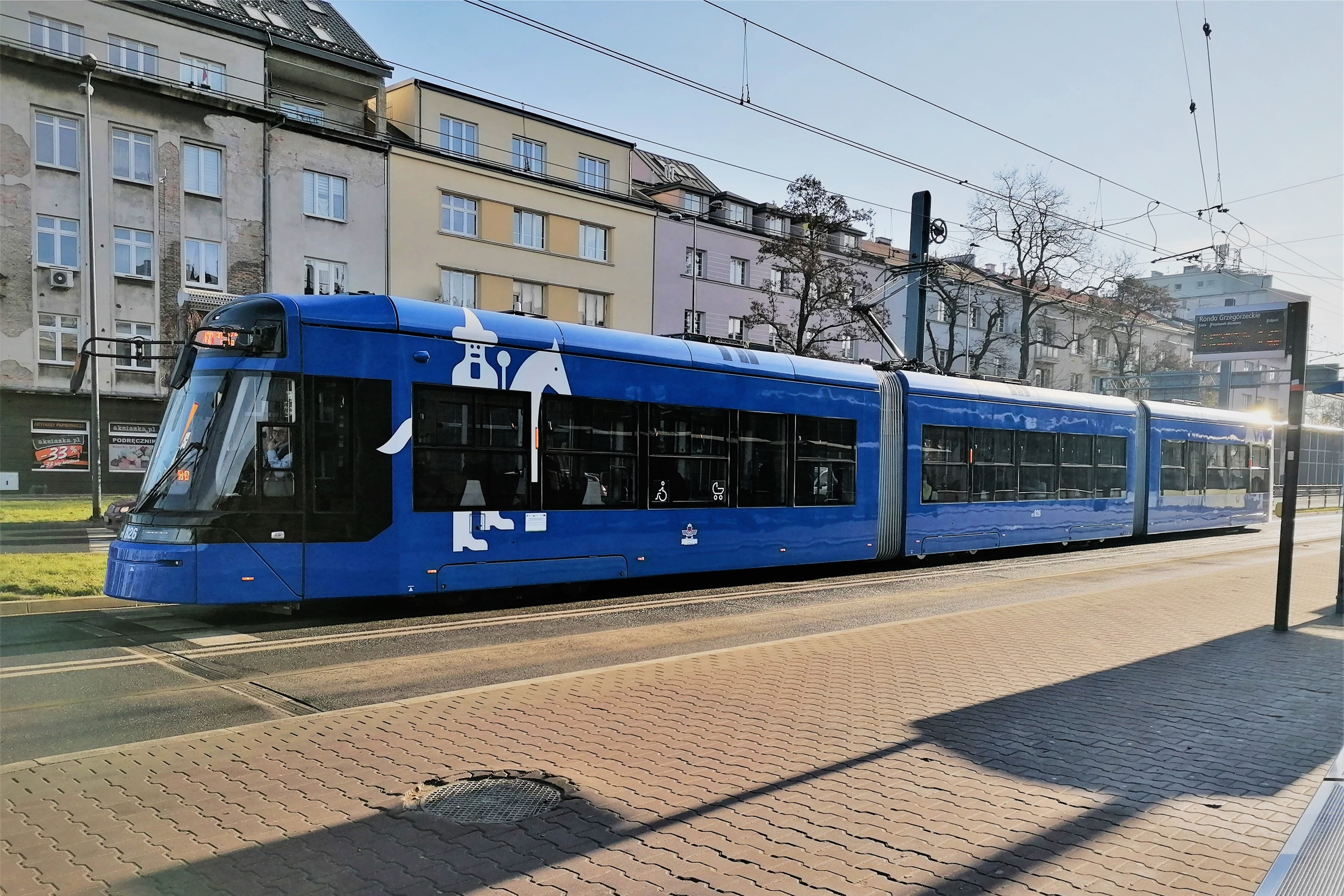
Stadler Tango Kraków Lajkonik

The first Stadler Tango Lajkonik tram was delivered to Kraków in December 2019. On 18 June 2020, the first wagons operated on regular lines. The first contract assumes delivery of 50 wagons, the second order consists of 60 ordered vehicles. Which brought the number up to 110.

These trams (although manufactured by a different company) are structurally similar to the Bombardier NGT8 wagons and consist of 3 sections and are 33.4 m long. Two vehicles are equipped with lithium-ion traction batteries allowing operation without overhead lines, and the remaining wagons will have the option of installing such batteries. Stadler Lajkonik is from the Stadler Tango Family and was designed by a Stadler Rail and Solaris Bus & Coach Consortium, but shortly after the contract was awarded, Stadler acquired the tram division of Solaris.

=== Former types ===
In addition to the cars in regular service, Kraków has a tram museum which is a part of the Muzeum Inżynierii Miejskiej (Museum of Urban Engineering) and it is located in the Św. Wawrzyńca Depot in Kazimierz district.

Historical rolling stock in Kraków

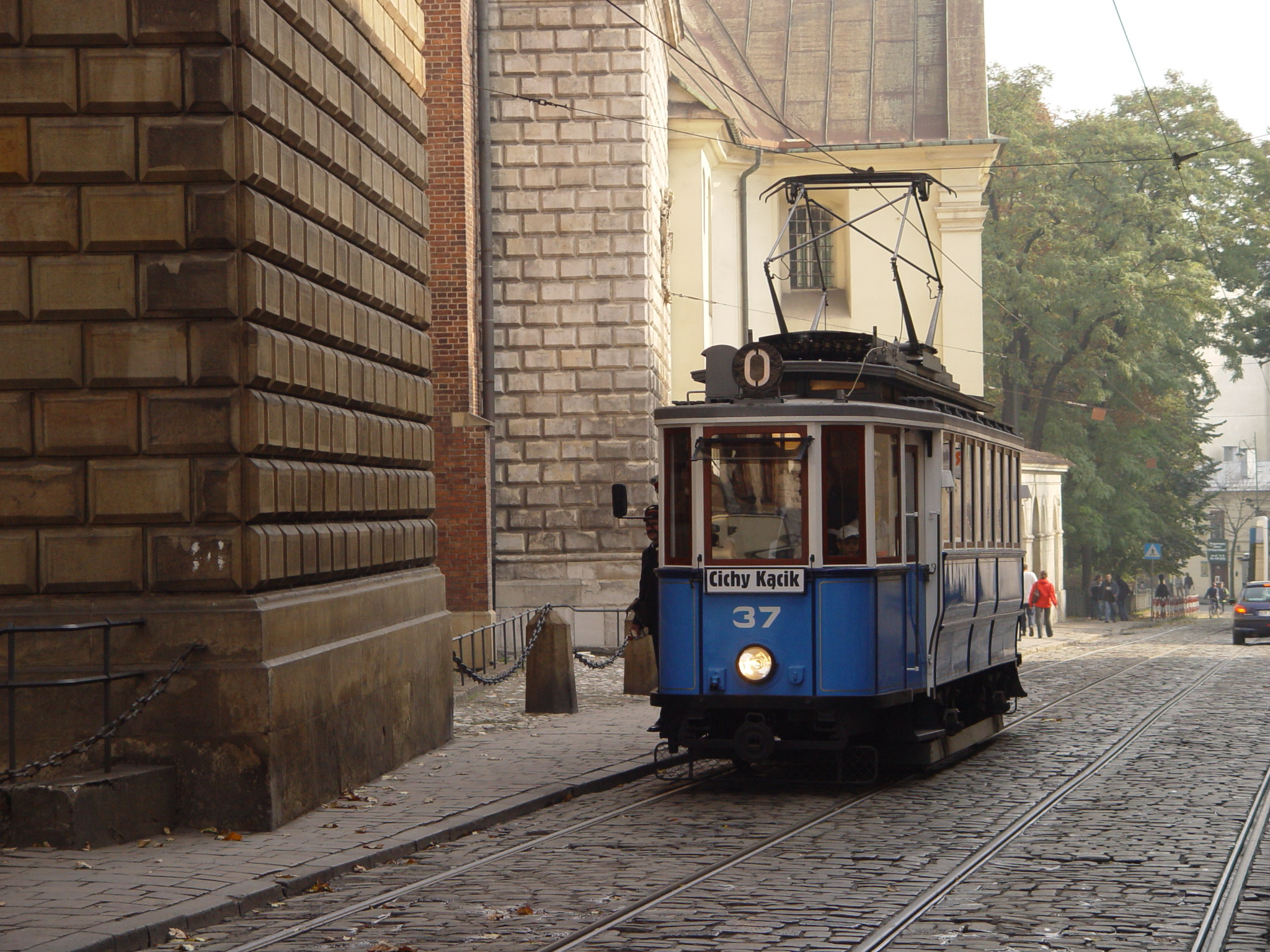
SN1+P3 from 1912

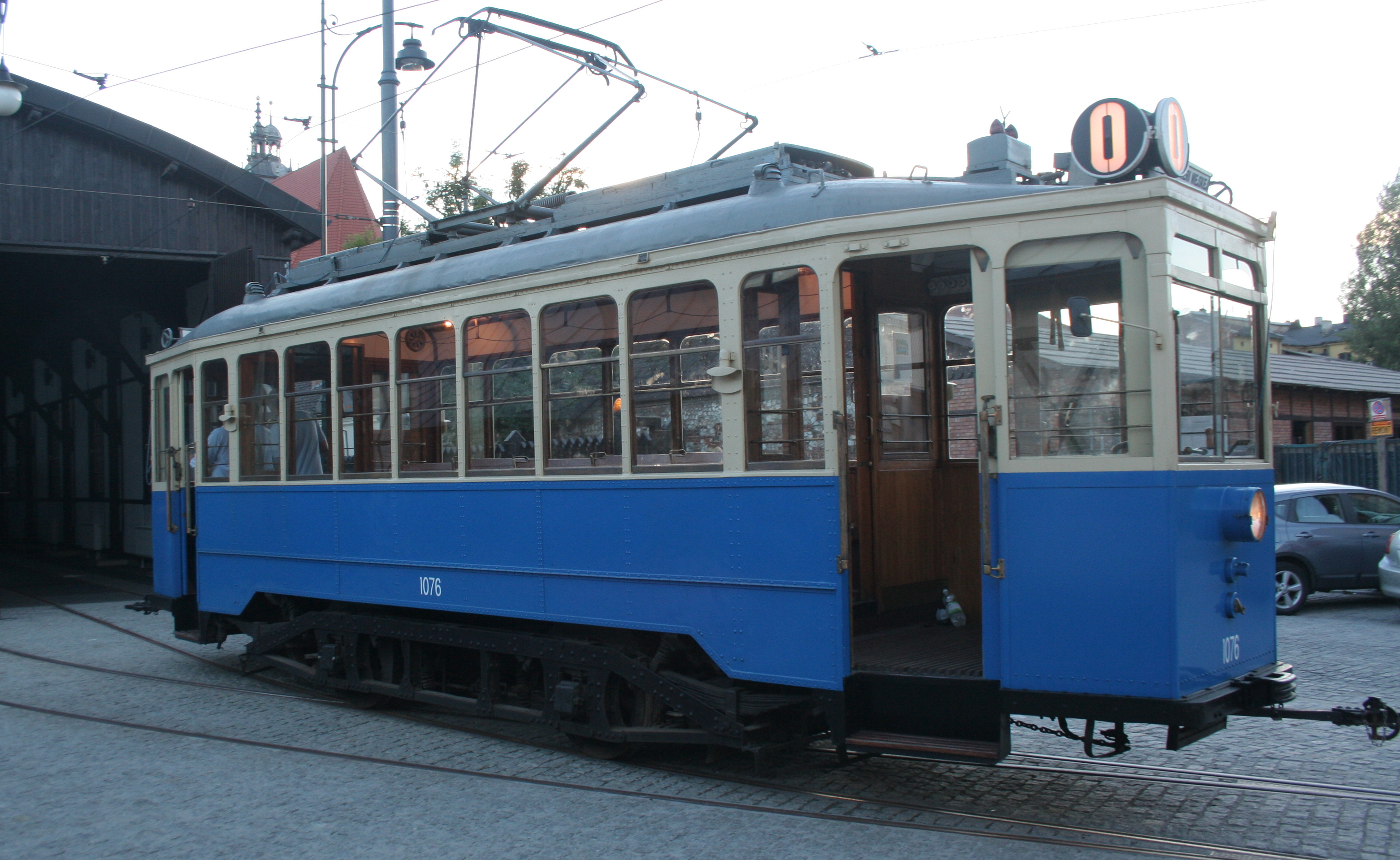
LH Standard from Wrocław (1924)

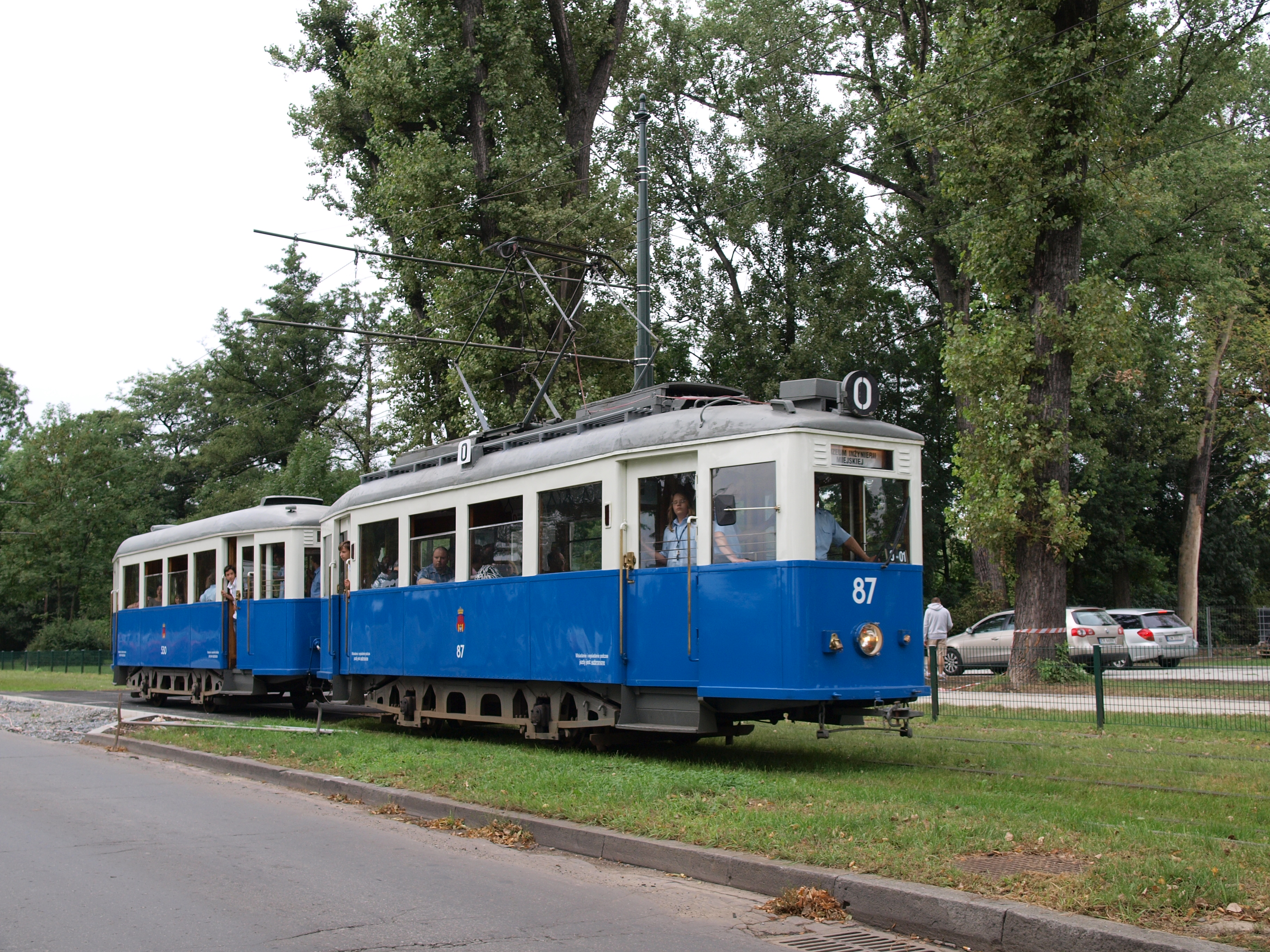
SN2+PN2 from 1939

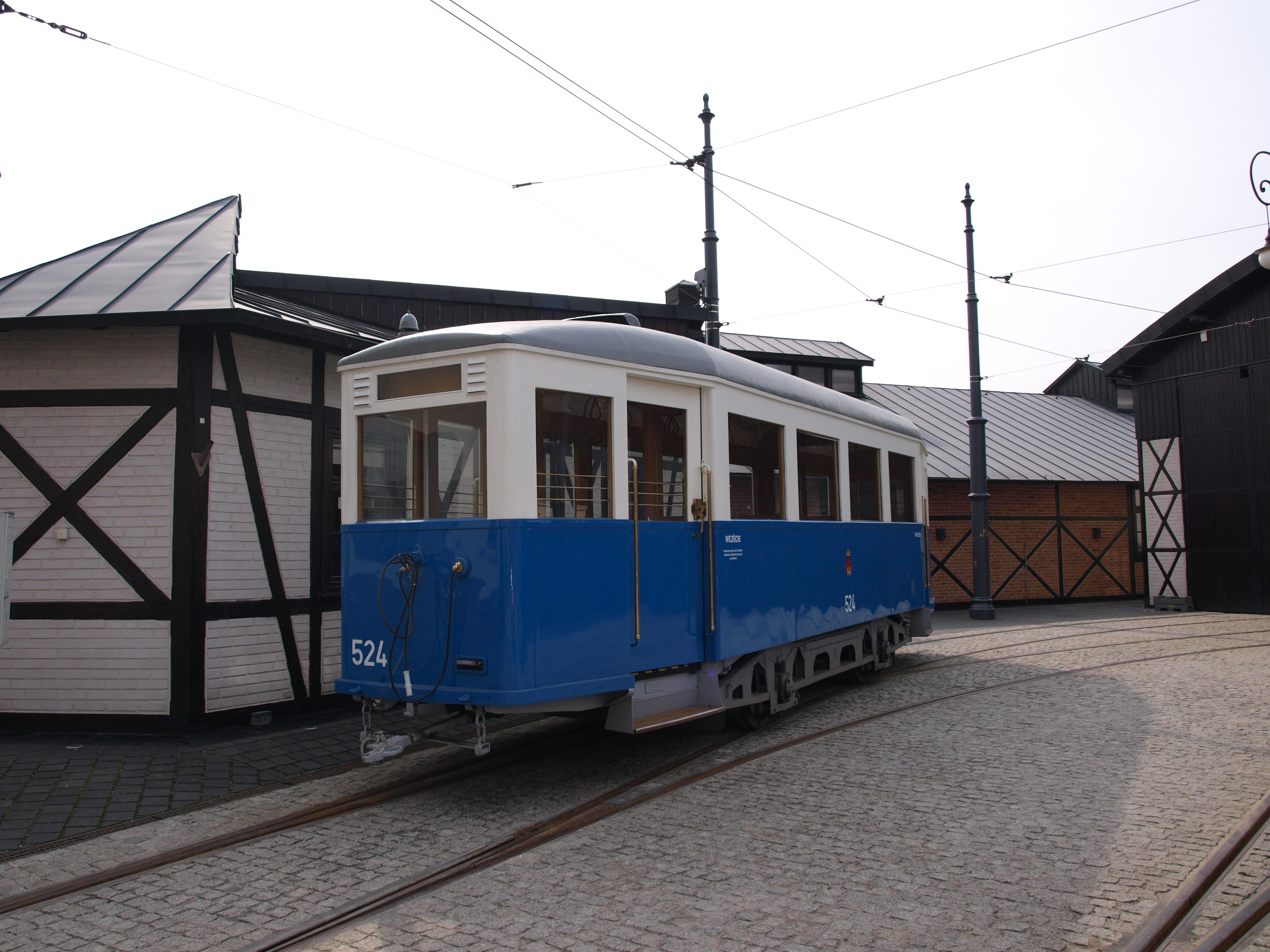
Another PN2 trailer from 1939
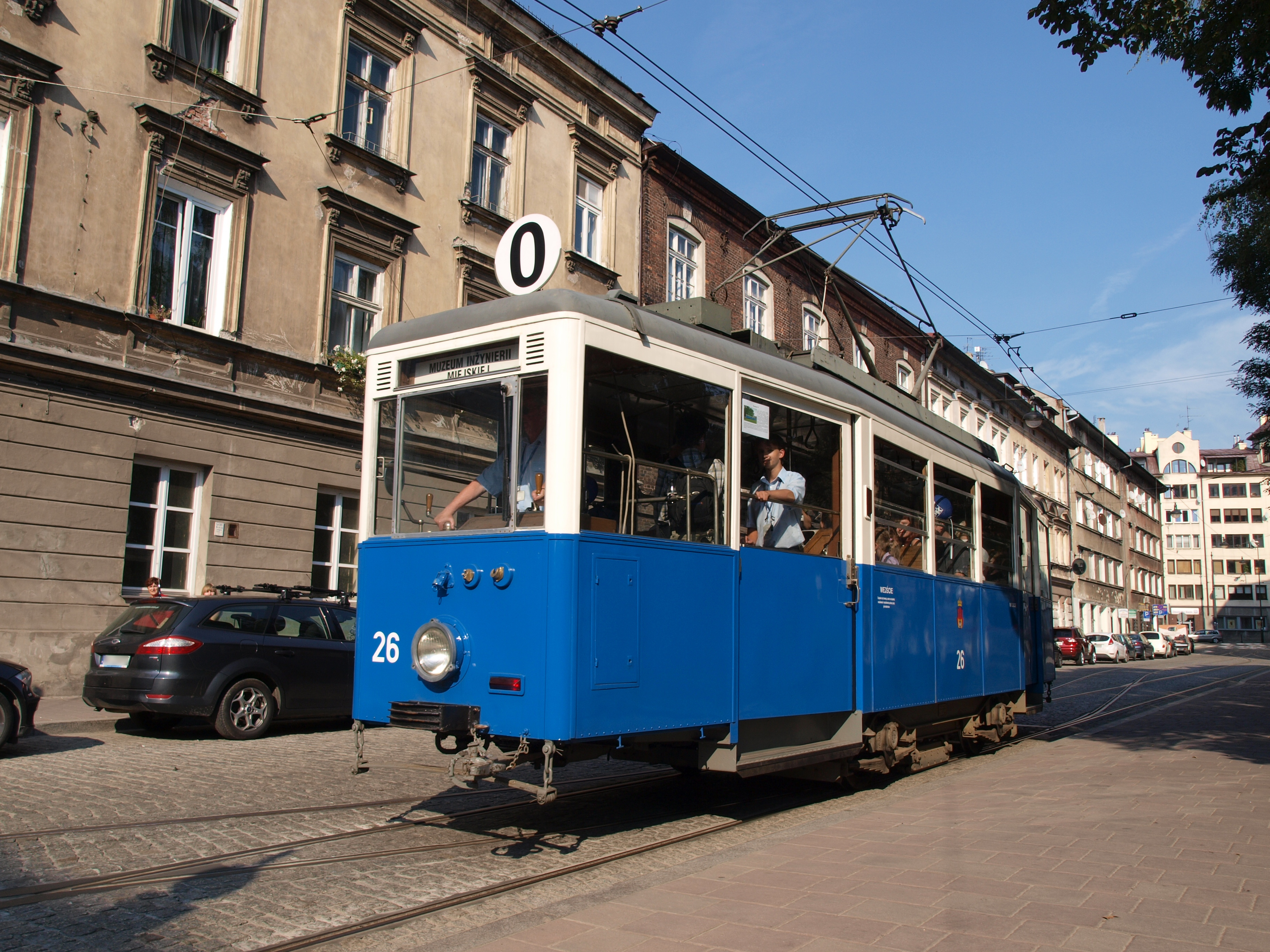
Konstal N+ND from 1954 operated by Silesian Interurbans

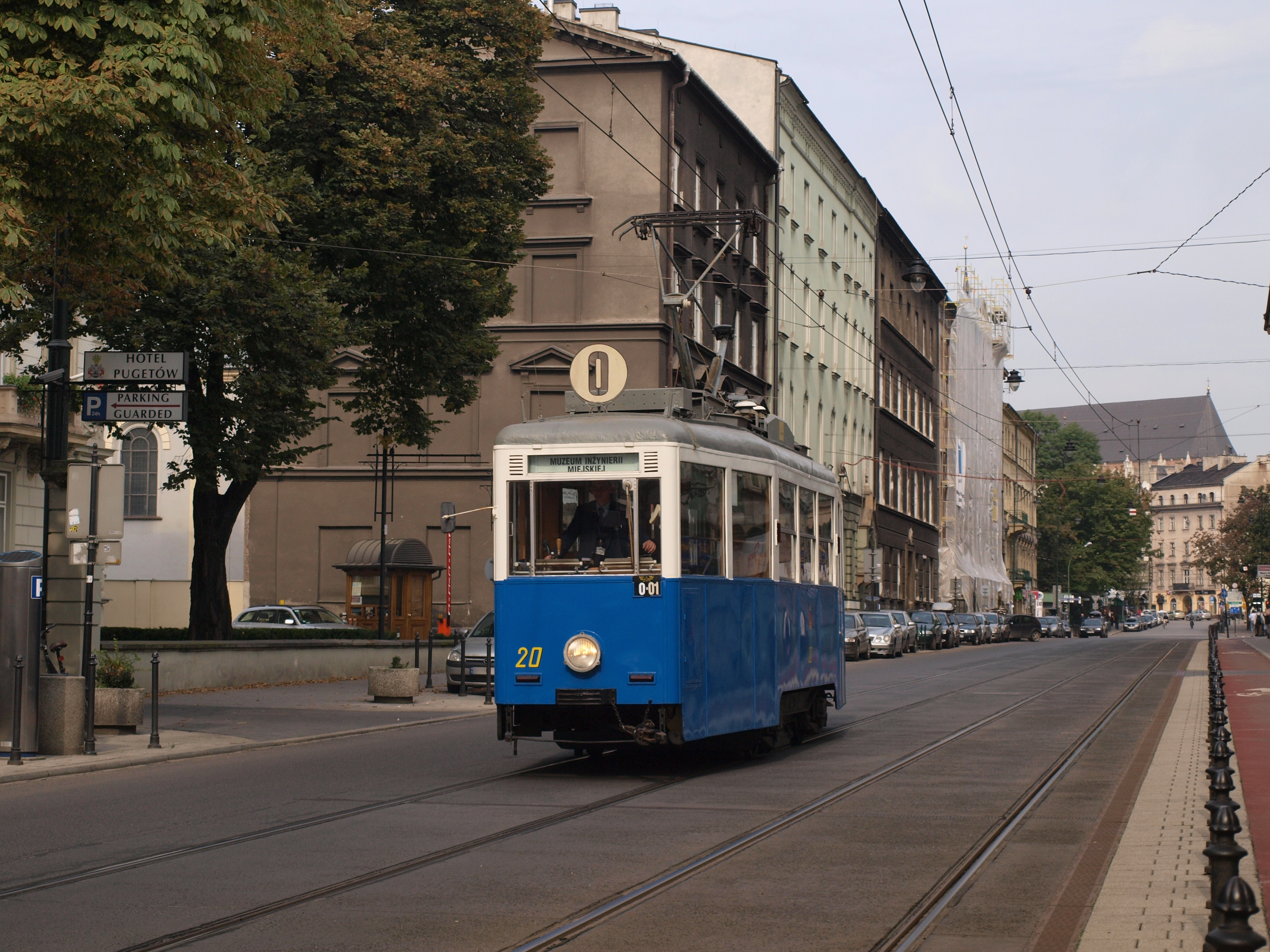
Konstal N from 1954 operated in Warsaw

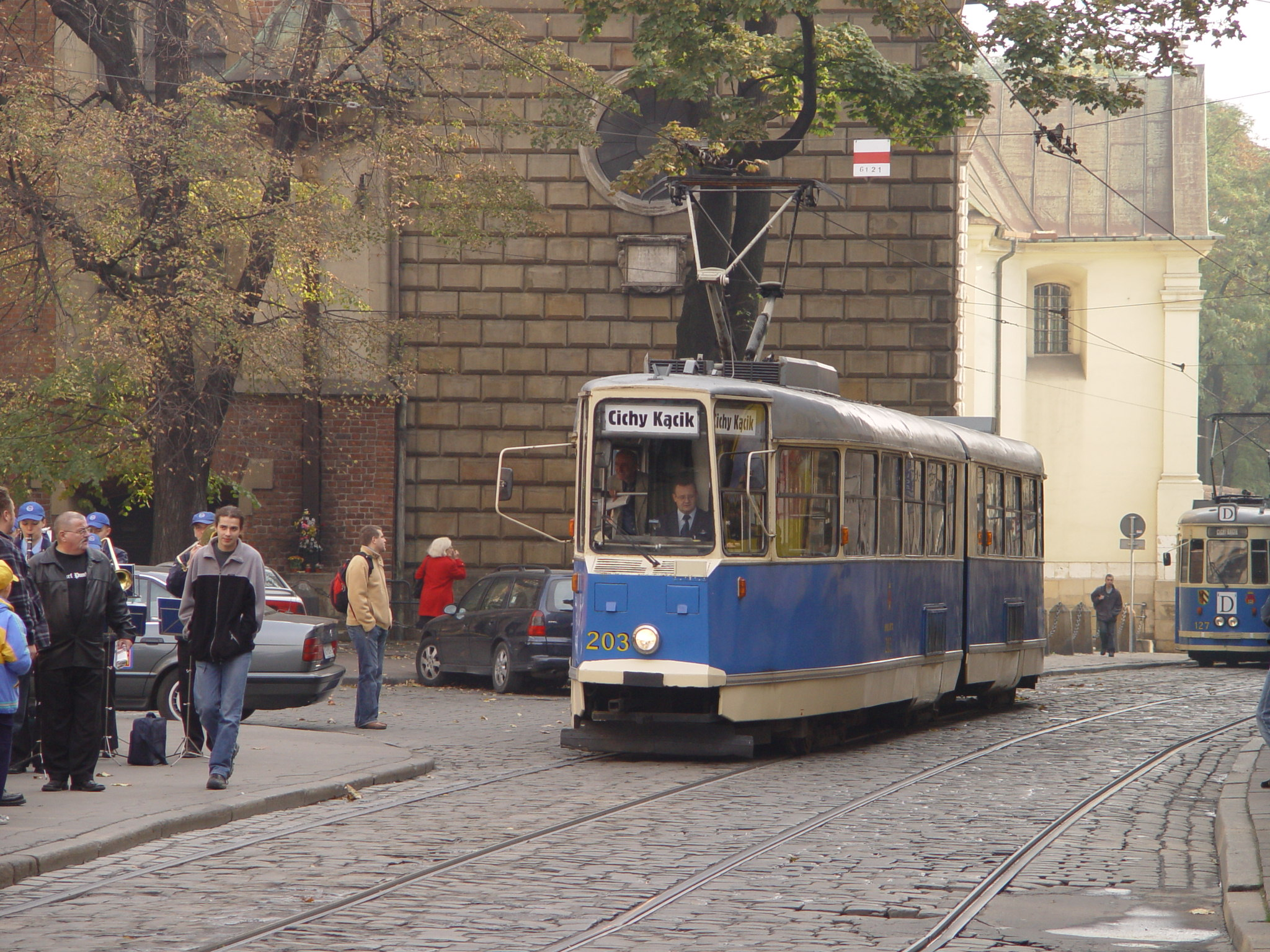
Konstal 102N from 1964

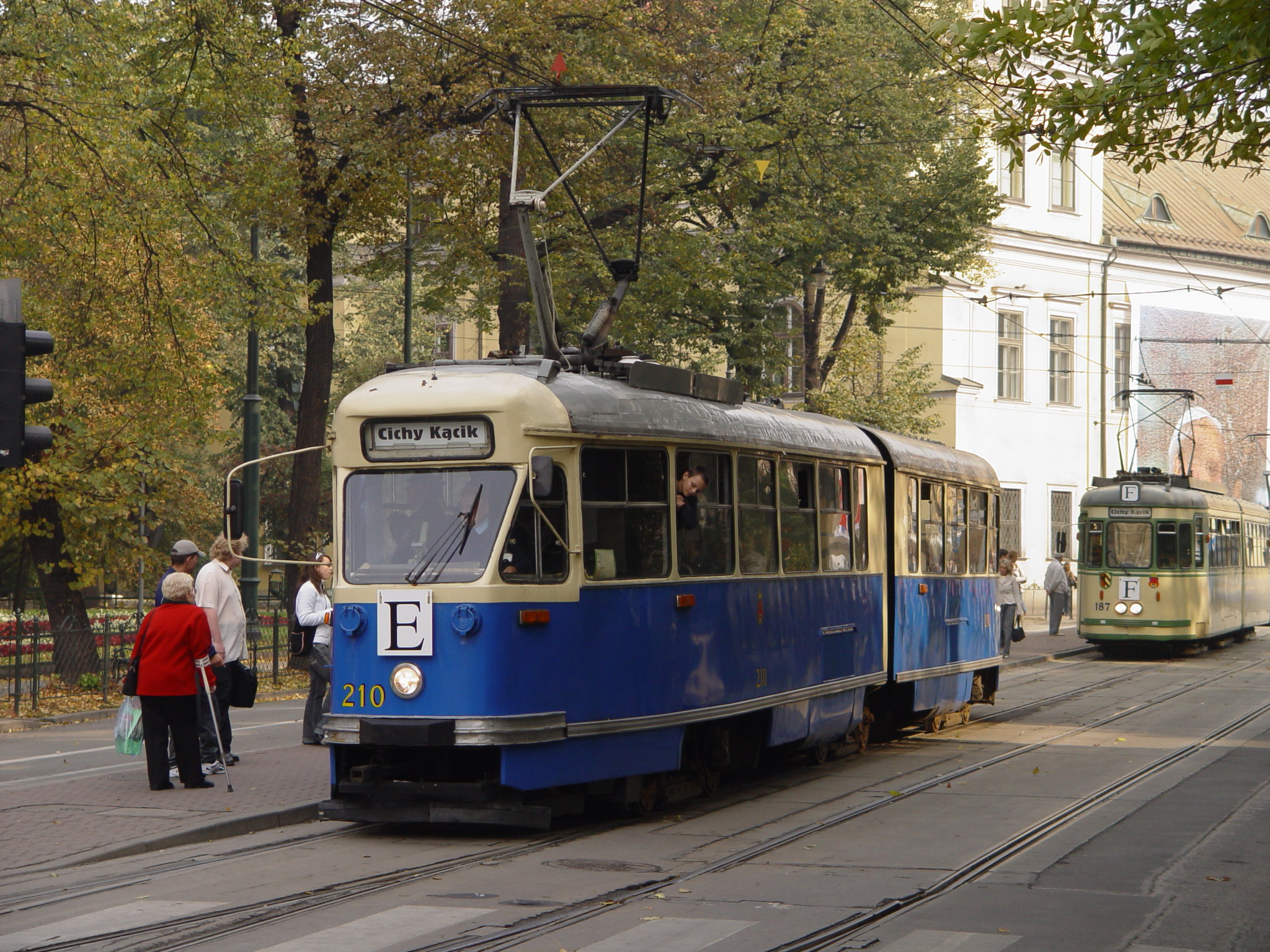
Konstal 102Na from 1970, the oldest car of this type in Poland

== See also ==
- Dworzec Główny Tunel
