= CeBIT =

Computer expo

Coordinates: 52°19′37″N 9°48′33″E

- Status: Defunct
- Genre: Computer Expo
- Frequency: Annually
- Venue: Hanover fairground
- Location: Hanover
- Country: Germany
- Inaugurated: 1970
- Most recent: 2018
- Attendance: 120,000 (2018)
- Organizer: Deutsche Messe AG
- Website: www.cebit.de

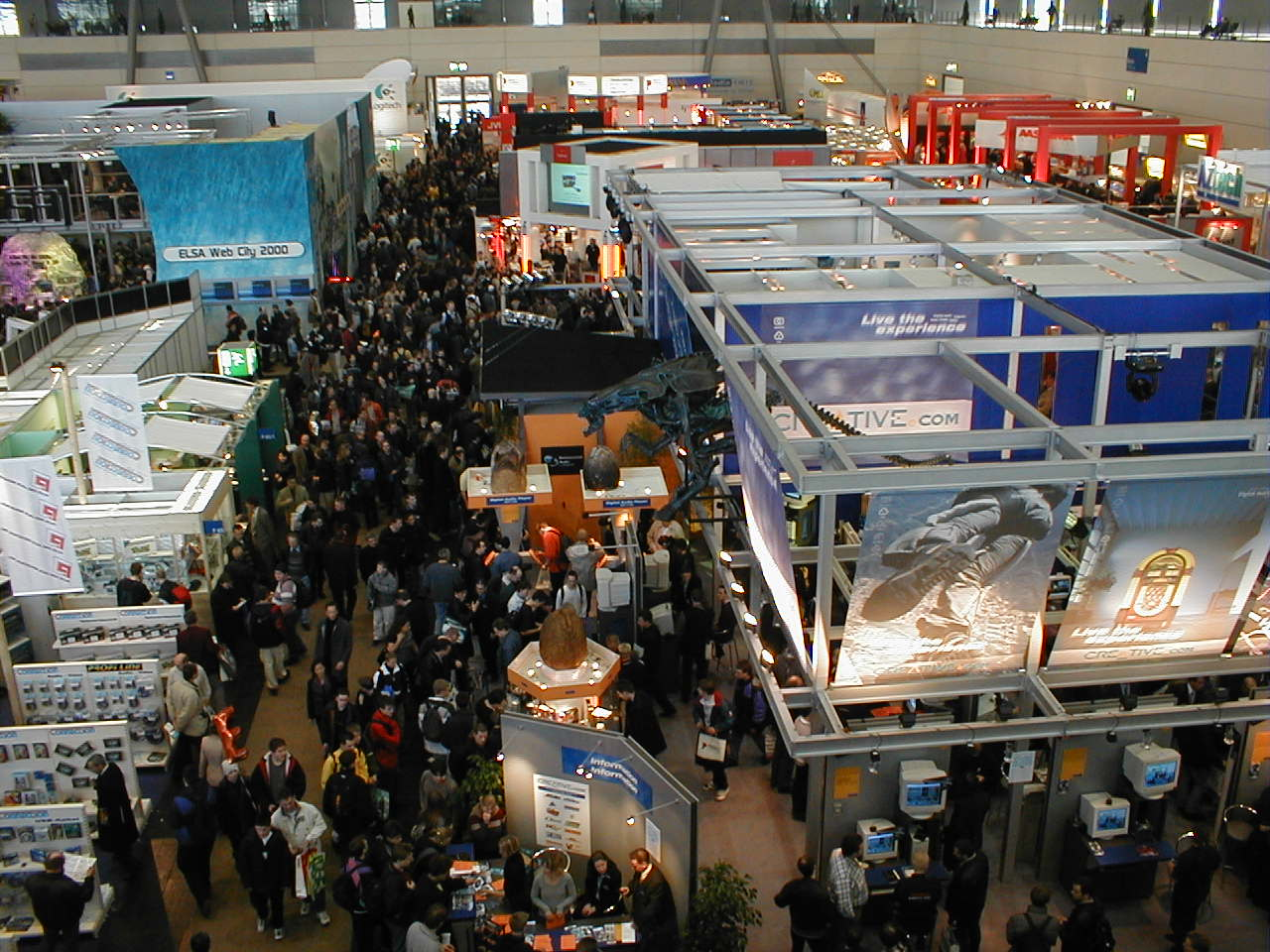
A crowded exhibition hall during CeBIT 2000

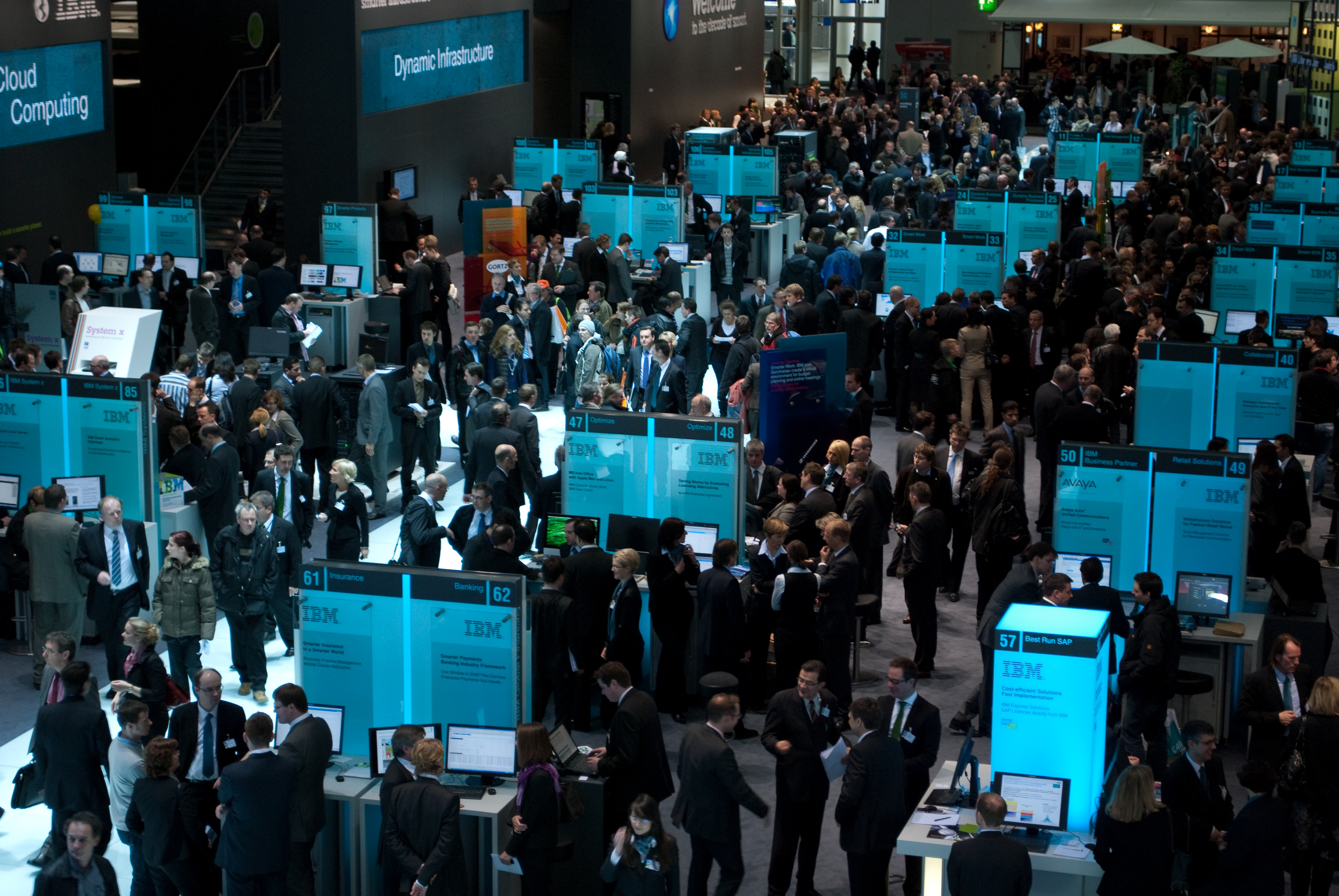
IBM stand during CeBIT 2010

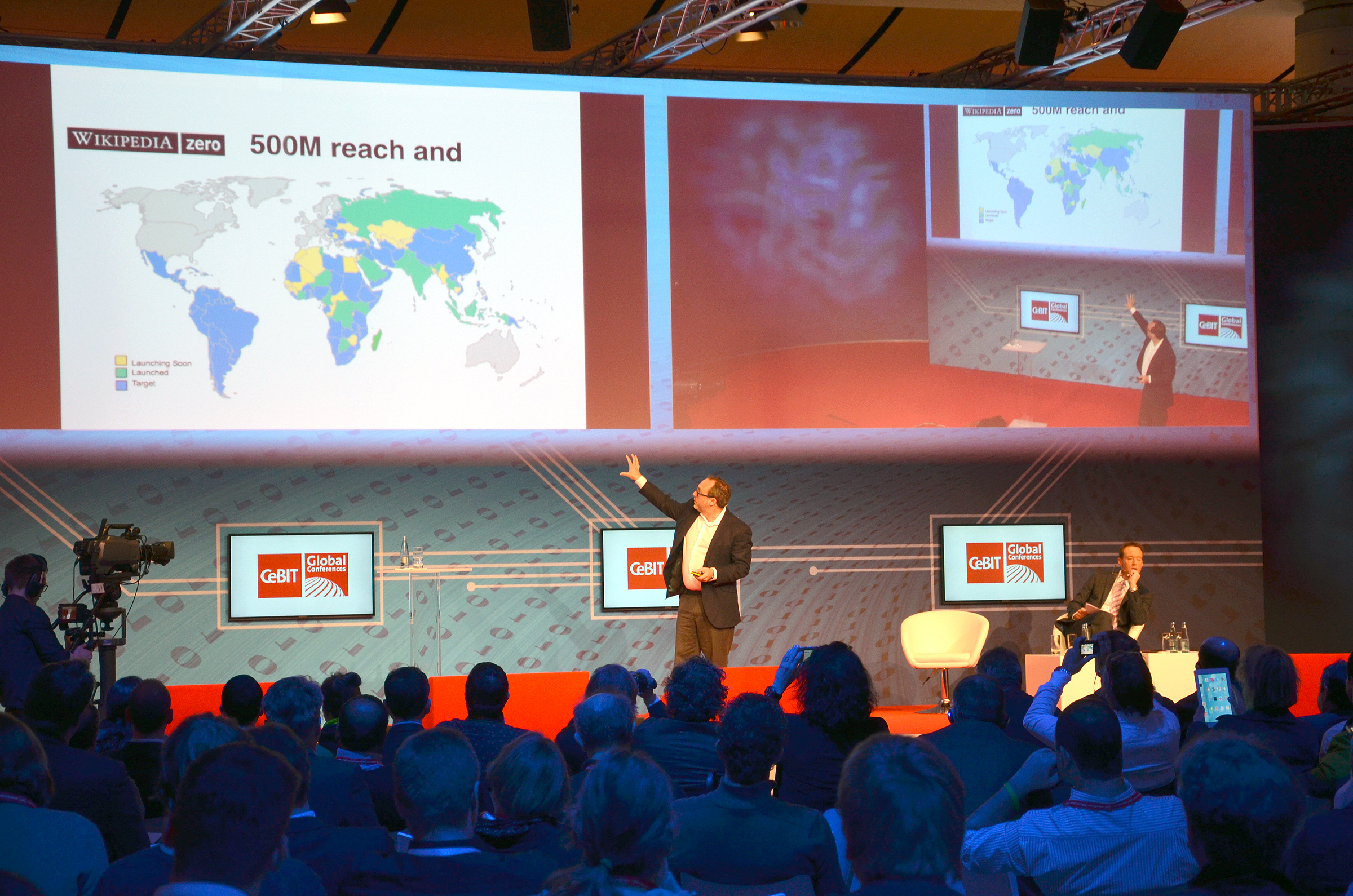
Jimmy Wales 2014 on CeBIT Global Conferences, Wikipedia Zero

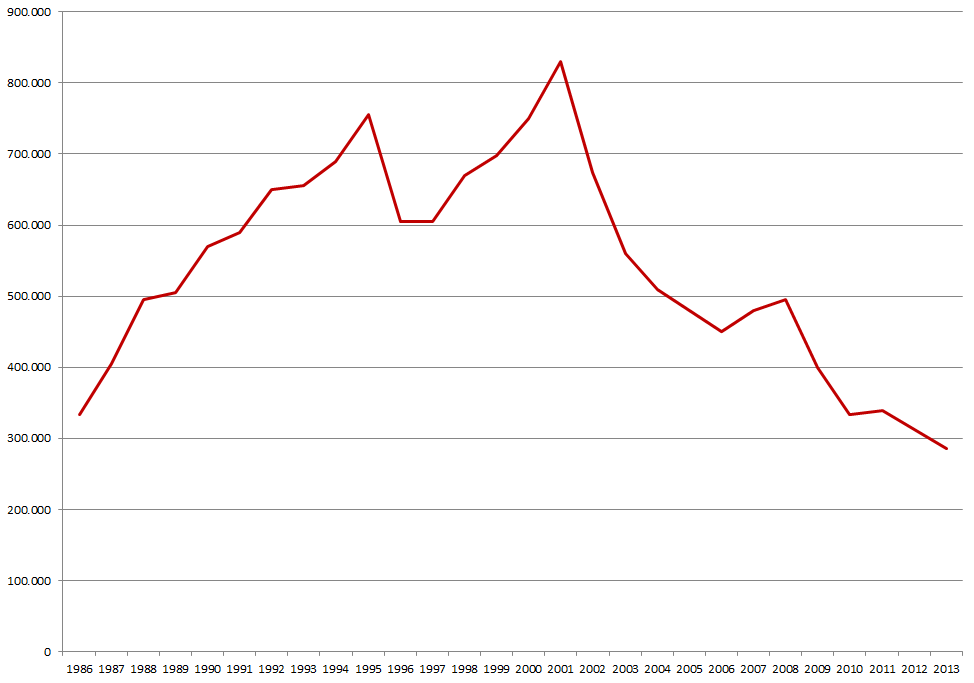
CeBIT attendance, 1986–2013

Logo used until 2017

CeBIT was a computer expo held each year on the Hanover fairground, the world's largest fairground, in Hanover, Germany. It was organized by Deutsche Messe AG.

Widely regarded as the world's largest and most influential computer trade fair with an exhibition area of roughly 450,000 m^{2} (4.8 million ft^{2}) and a peak attendance of 850,000 visitors during the dot-com boom, it was larger both in area and attendance than COMPUTEX and COMDEX, its Asian and American counterparts, respectively. CeBIT is a German language acronym for Centrum für Büroautomation, Informationstechnologie und Telekommunikation, which translates as "Center for Office Automation, Information Technology and Telecommunication".

The final CeBIT took place in 2018.

== History ==
CeBIT was traditionally the computing portion of the Hanover Fair, a major industry trade show held every year. It was established in 1970, with the opening of the Hanover fairground's new Hall 1, then the largest exhibition hall in the world. However, in the 1980s the information technology and telecommunications part was straining the resources of the trade fair so much that it was given a separate trade show starting in 1986, which was held four weeks earlier than the main Hanover Fair.

The number of visitors for the new exhibition increased to 830,000 in 2001, but by 2007 the CeBIT expo attendance had shrunk to around 200,000, then attendance rebounded to 334,000 by 2010. The 2008 expo was marred by police raids of 51 exhibitors for patent infringement. In 2009, the U.S. state of California became official Partner State of Germany's IT and telecommunications industry association, BITKOM, and of CeBIT 2009. focusing on environmentally-friendly technologies. Twick.it was presented at CeBIT 2010.

From 2007 till 2013, the fair acted as the World Championship (Grand Final) of Intel Extreme Masters. The championship was reallocated to Katowice, Poland in 2014.

On 28 November 2018, Deutsche Messe AG announced that due to declining visitor and exhibitioner attendance, CeBIT would be canceled for the foreseeable future. This makes CeBIT 2018 the final event.

== Other CeBIT-branded shows ==
As CeBIT continued to grow quickly and was becoming too big on its own, it was decided to concentrate on the professional market, while the home and entertainment market was given a separate show, CeBIT Home, during summer, planned to be biennial. However, after being held twice (in 1996 and 1998), the 2000 CeBIT Home (had originally been scheduled to be held in Leipzig due to the Expo 2000 being held in Hanover) was cancelled and the project was abandoned.

Since 1999 the CeBIT sponsor Deutsche Messe AG ("German Trade Show, Inc.") has organized trade shows outside of Germany bearing the CeBIT name:

- Internet +, powered by CeBIT (formerly CeBIT Asia), in Shanghai, China
- CeBIT Australia, in Sydney
- CeBIT Eurasia Bilişim, in Istanbul, Turkey
- CeBIT America/USA in New York City, United States. It was held in 2003 and 2004, but subsequently cancelled in 2005.
- CeBIT India, in Bangalore, India
- BITS Mexico, powered by CeBIT, in México City.
- CeBIT ASEAN Thailand, in Bangkok, Thailand.

== CeBIT Global Conferences ==
Running over a five-day period in Hanover, Germany, the CeBIT Global Conferences (CGC) are staged congruently with the CeBIT exhibition. The conferences are dedicated to providing a 360° overview of the digital industry's four core markets: IT, Telecommunications, Digital Media and Consumer Electronics. Noted industry figures and researchers from across the globe are invited to speak on the latest relevant trends and innovations as well as their impact on society and the working world. The conference is divided up into keynote speeches, talks and panel discussions. The CGC conferences are produced by Deutsche Messe AG, with the German BITKOM association acting as the CGC patron since 2009. In 2014, the CGC were staged with 140 speakers on three stages with a program of 70 conference hours and 3000 participants. Target groups of the conference are CXOs, managers, experts, visionaries and out-of-the-box thinkers, Conference languages are English and German.

Recent conferences have featured the following keynote themes:

- 2008: "Improving Life in the Global Village". This installment of CGC attracted 1,900 visitors and 43 speakers attending the keynotes and discussion sessions.
- 2009: "How Will We Be Working, Living and Communicating in the Coming Years?" This CGC drew 3,133 visitors from 88 nations, with some 2,200 guests following the conference via live streaming.
- 2010: "The Challenges of a Changing World – ICT for Better Lives and Better Business", attracting some 4,000 guests from more than 100 nations. Just under 4,000 guests also visited the conference via live streaming.
- 2011: "The Power of Creativity and Innovation".

=== Speaker list 2014 ===
- Steve Wozniak, co-founder Apple Computer
- Jimmy Wales, founder Wikipedia
- Eugene Kaspersky, CEO and Chairman, Kaspersky Lab
- Mark Shuttleworth, founder, Canonical
- Neelie Kroes, Vice President, European Commission
- Sir Nigel Shadbolt, Chairman and co-founder, Open Data Institute (ODI)
- Dean Douglas, CEO Unify
- Cristina Riesen, General Manager Europe, Evernote
- Mikko Hyppönen, Chief Research Officer, F-Secure

Over the years, speakers at the CeBIT Global Conferences have included Gov. Arnold Schwarzenegger, Governor of California; Kevin Turner, COO, Microsoft, Craig Barrett, Chairman of the Board, Intel, Jon Iwata SVP Marketing & Communications, IBM, Reid Hoffman, Chairman and CEO, LinkedIn; Mukund Krishna, CEO Suyati Inc; Scott Durchslag, COO, Skype; Werner Vogels, Vice President & CTO, Amazon, Stewart Butterfield, Co-founder of Flickr.com, Michael T. Jones, Chief Technology Advocate, Google & Founder of Google Earth; Mark Kingdon, CEO, LindenLab.

== CeBIT Awards ==
CeBIT was a platform for recognising achievement by ICT businesses, particularly in Australia. The awards include the Excellence in Communications Award, the Advanced Retail Technology Award, the Innovative IT Security Award, and the Early Innovators Award. Notable past winners include Motorola, McAfee and eWAY.

== See also ==
- List of computer-related awards
- CES (Las Vegas, Nevada, US)
- IFA Berlin (Berlin, Germany)
- COMPUTEX (Taipei, Taiwan)
- SIMO TCI (Madrid, Spain)
