= Manfred Schurti =

Former racing car driver

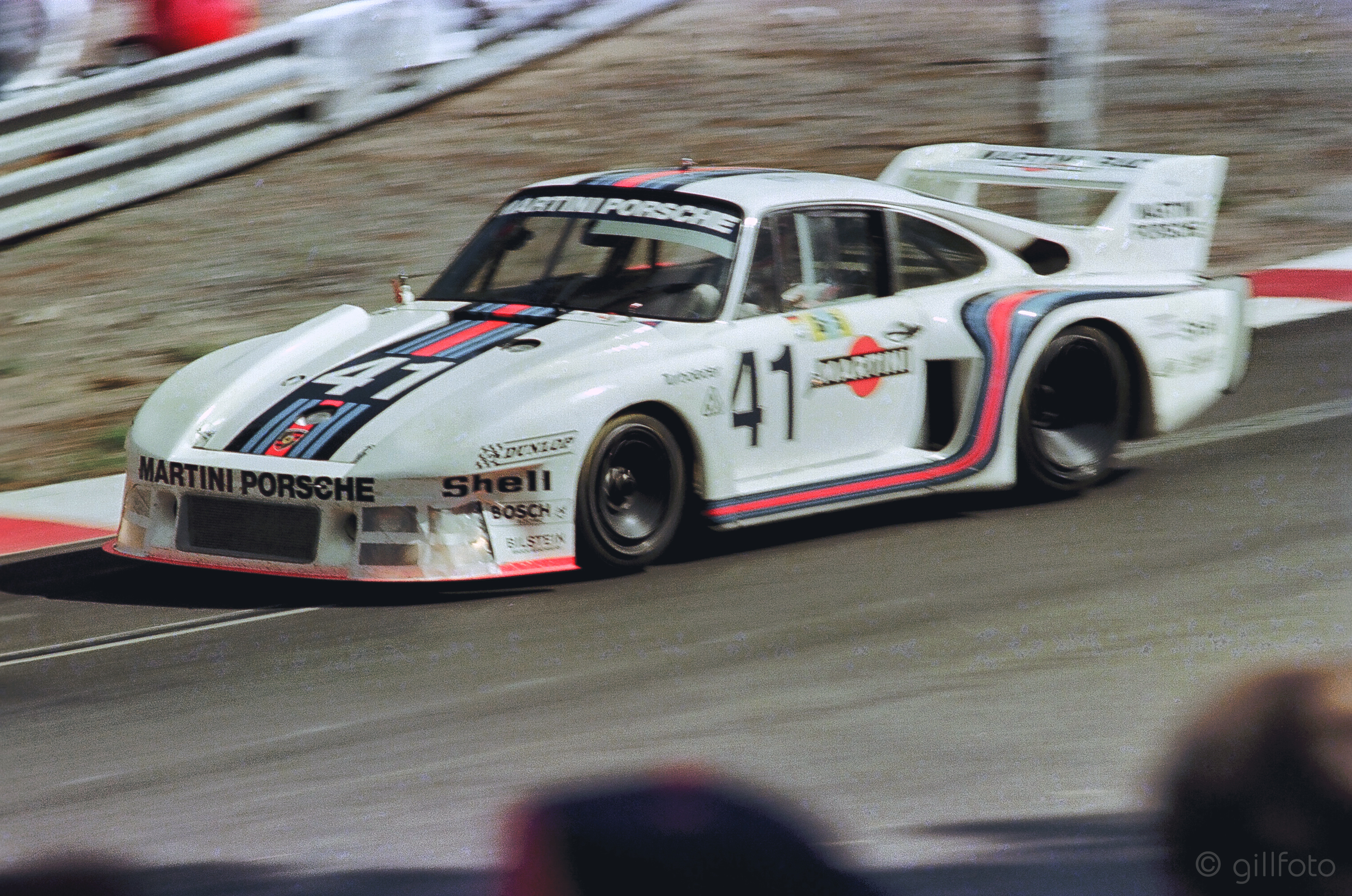
- Schurti competing in the 1977 24 Hours of Le Mans.
- Nationality: Liechtensteiner
- Born: 24 December 1941 (age 84) Lustenau, Austria

Manfred Schurti (born 24 December 1941) is a former touring and prototype racing car driver from Liechtenstein mainly known for racing factory-entered Porsches.

== Biography ==
Schurti was born on Christmas Eve in Austria, but his parents moved after the war to the nearby small principality of Liechtenstein.

A mechanic by trade who became leader of the national motor vehicle inspection authority (Motorfahrzeugkontrolle MFK), Schurti began with moto cross and wanted to switch to motorcycle racing. His sponsor Baron von Falz-Fein denied support for a two-wheel effort, but offered a ride in a Formula Vee, where a group of Austrians including Niki Lauda supported each other with slipstreaming. Schurti managed to keep up with them, winning his first race in 1969 in Hockenheim, and then the 1970 World championship. In 1972, with Hilti support, he won the Formel Super Vau Castrol Trophy series and the International Castrol GTX Trophy, and was elected Sportsman of the year in Liechtenstein.

Schurti's entry in Formula 2 was expensive but the car was not competitive. In 1976, after testing a similar Williams-F1 in Goodwood, the 34-year-old switched to touring car and sportscar racing, like the German Deutsche Rennsport Meisterschaft series, where he won three events. In 1980 he competed in the BMW M1 Procar Championship, winning once, on the AVUS in Berlin. Peter Sauber made him a good offer to race sportscars, but the 39-year-old, who witnessed fatal crashes, decided to retire from pro racing. He came out of retirement to contest the 1984 Nürburgring Race of Champions in a Mercedes-Benz 190E, which he later bought once converted to a road car.

== Le Mans results ==
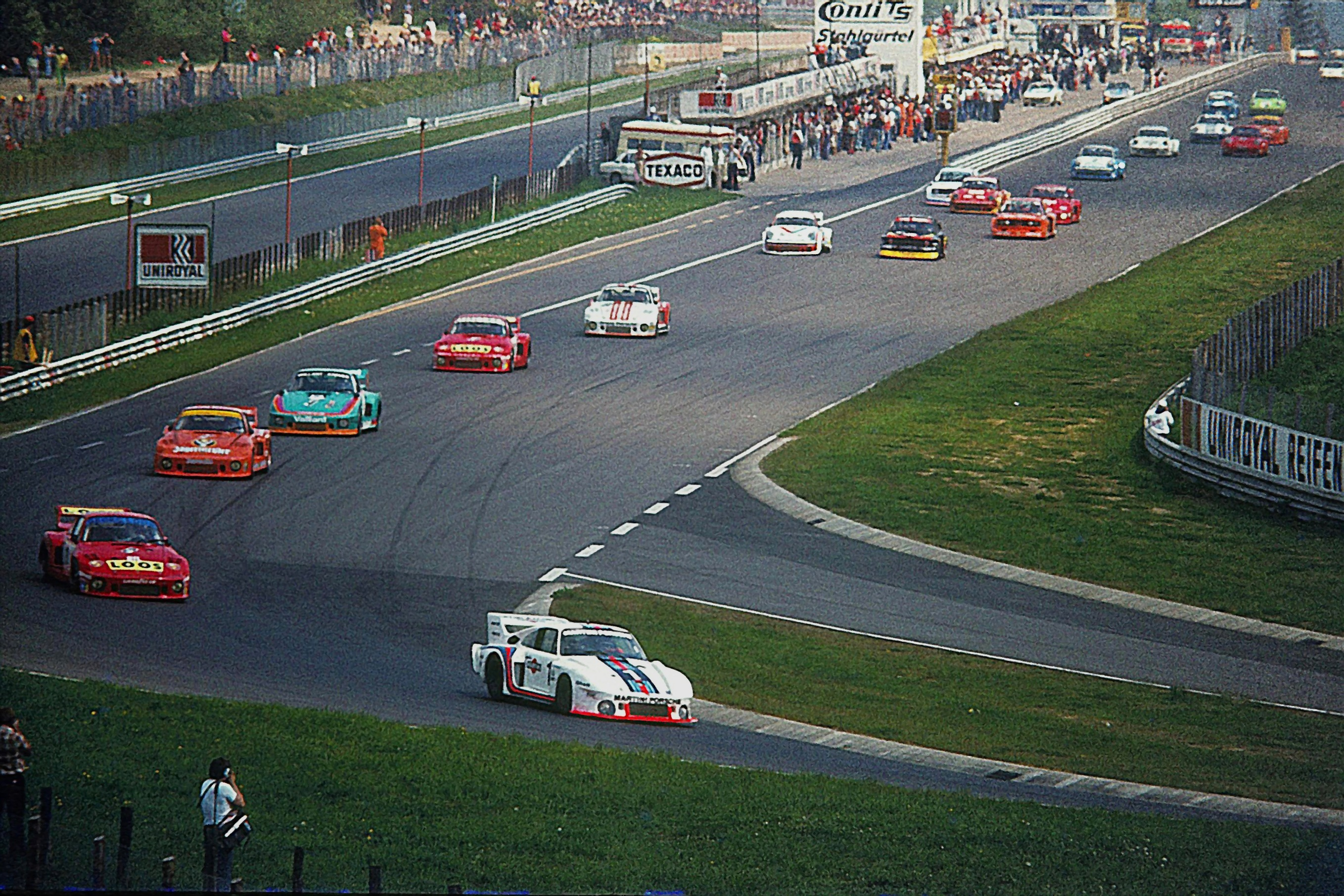
Schurti (third from front) at the 1977 1000km Nürburgring.

Schurti entered the 1974 24 Hours of Le Mans with a factory Martini Racing Porsche 911 Carrera RSR Turbo prototype which caught fire while the other car finished second overall. In 1975, when Porsche was absent developing the 911-based Porsche 935 and the Porsche 936 sports car for 1976, he finished fifth (and first in GTS class) in a regular 911 Carrera RSR together with three other drivers.

Schurti was a test driver for Porsche, which in 1976 competed in two separate World Championships. With main drivers Jacky Ickx, Jochen Mass, and Rolf Stommelen also busy in F1, Schurti and Jürgen Barth substituted or raced backup cars.

Schurti backed up the factory Le Mans entry with the 935 in 1976, finishing first in class (Group 5) and fourth overall. He returned in 1977 and 1978 in the factory 935, and in 1979, when the factory was absent, with a private 935, while another private 935 won. He also supported the factory entries of Porsche 924 variants from 1980 to 1982.

=== Complete results ===
Year	Team	Co-Drivers	Car	Class	Laps	Ovr. Pos.	Class Pos.
1974	(West Germany) Martini Racing Porsche System	(Austria) Helmut Koinigg	Porsche 911 Carrera RSR Turbo	S 3.0	87	DNF	DNF
1975	(West Germany) Gelo Racing Team	(Netherlands) Gijs van Lennep (United Kingdom) John Fitzpatrick (Netherlands) Toine Hezemans	Porsche 911 Carrera RSR	GTS	316	5th	1st
1976	(West Germany) Martini Racing Porsche System	(West Germany) Rolf Stommelen	Porsche 935	Gr.5; SP	331	4th	1st
1977	(West Germany) Martini Racing Porsche System	(West Germany) Rolf Stommelen	Porsche 935	Gr.5	52	DNF	DNF
1978	(West Germany) Martini Racing Porsche System	(West Germany) Rolf Stommelen	Porsche 935	Gr.5 +2.0	326	8th	3rd
1979	(West Germany) Gelo Racing Sportswear International	(West Germany) Hans Heyer	Porsche 935	Gr.5 +2.5	196	DNF	DNF
1980	(West Germany) Porsche System	(West Germany) Jürgen Barth	Porsche 924	GTP	316	6th	3rd
1981	(West Germany) Porsche System	(United Kingdom) Andy Rouse	Porsche 924	IMSA; GTO	315	11th	1st
1982	(United States) B.F. Goodrich	(United States) Patrick Bedard (United States) Paul Miller	Porsche 924	IMSA; GTO	128	DNF	DNF
