= Twick.it =

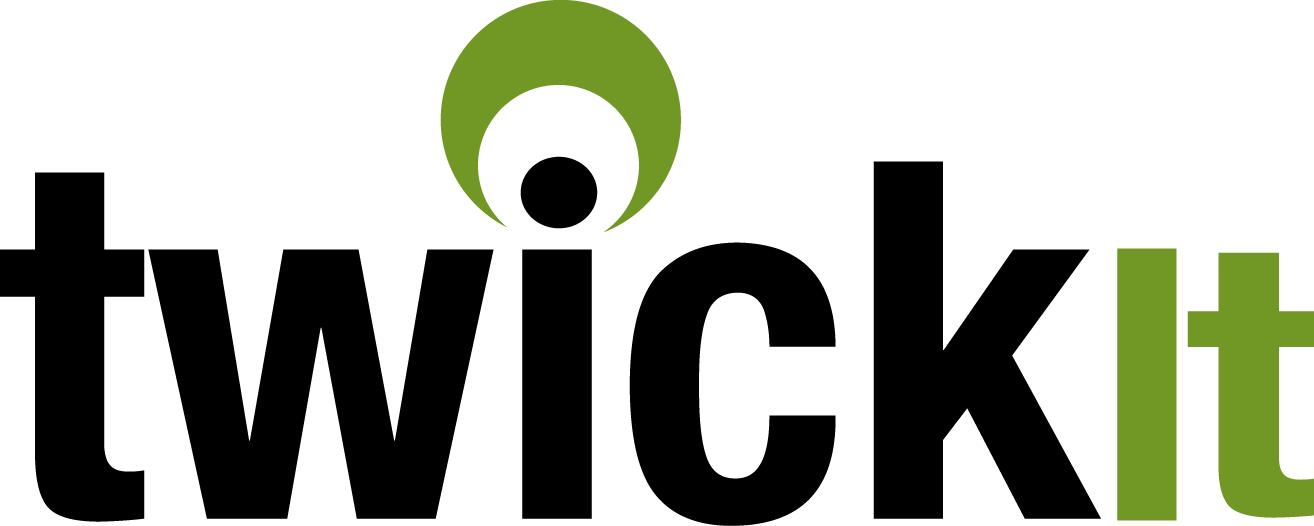
- Website type: Encyclopedia
- Owners: Markus Möller, Sean Andrew Kollak
- Website: twick.it (formerly)
- Commercial: No
- Launched: 19 October 2009
- Current status: Discontinued
- Content license: Creative Commons Attribution 3.0 Germany

Twick.it was an online glossary consisting of statements up to 140 characters. The user-generated definitions were ranked by agreement and disagreement votes. Twick.it was called an "explain engine" by its community. The limitation of the entries (so called "Twicks") to 140 characters was adapted from Twitter, and the idea of user-generated reference work from Wikipedia (although entries submitted by one user could not be modified by other users). Content is available under the Creative Commons License "CC-BY."

The project by Markus Möller and Sean Andrew Kollak launched in November 2009 with a public beta phase and was presented at CeBIT 2010. Since the end of 2009 print media and radio broadcasts reported about the project. In 2010, Twick.it won the second prize at the German Social-Media Award.

By October 2011, over 18,000 explanations (mainly in German) had been created.

In June 2012, the owners announced the discontinuation of Twick.it as of August 2012 because of lack of interest.

== Technology ==
The platform was programmed in PHP with a MySQL database. No frameworks were used on the server side. In the frontend, the JavaScript frameworks Prototype and Script.aculo.us were used. An open REST API allowed external applications to access the existing entries.

== Details ==
Twick.it differed from other online encyclopedias by the short length of the explanation and the fact that there could be more than one explanation of a topic. A system of ranking, in which all registered users can participate equally, was meant to ensure that the best rated explanation appears at top; articles which are judged by the community as an incorrect or incomplete, rank on irrelevant lower ranks.

All topics were to be provided automatically with keywords. Through this indexing, it was possible to find other related topics.

In June 2011 the second phase of the project with features for community building (discussion walls, message center, automatic notifications) was launched.

== Links to other media ==
The goal of Twick.it was to use the collected short explanations in other services and devices. External services were to be enriched by short explanations by certain mashups.

=== On websites ===
The platform included the plugin Twick.it Tool Tip: On sites which installed the corresponding JavaScript code for the tooltips, the definitions of Twick.it could be directly accessed. The site visitor would select a word and the explanation (the Twick.it community has chosen as the most relevant) of the selected text would be shown as mouseover. There was also a corresponding plug-in for the blogging software WordPress.

=== On mobile devices ===
The collected explanations could by displayed in browsers for augmented reality, as Layar, junaio and Wikitude. Thus location-based explanations were displayed on the screen of the mobile phone. In August 2010, Twick.it was awarded as the best "Augmented Reality World" in the category "Social" at the World Cup Wikitude.

Furthermore, there were several apps to look up explanations on mobile phones and tablets: Twickdroid (Android), Twick.it Mobile (iPhone), Twick.it-2-go (iPhone) and Twick.it-2-goHD (iPad).

=== As audio file ===
Since February 2011 German Twicks had also been available as a podcast. This project was supported by Wikimedia Germany.
