= Metaio =

Augmented reality company

Metaio GmbH
- Type: Private
- Industry: Technology, software, developer platforms
- Founded: 2003; 23 years ago, in Munich, Germany
- Founders: Günter Greiner, Peter Georg Meier, Thomas Alt
- Defunct: 2015
- Fate: Acquired by Apple
- Headquarters: Munich, Germany
- Area served: Worldwide
- Key people: Thomas Alt (CEO), Peter Meier (CTO)
- Products: Software Technology; Augmented reality systems
- Parent: Apple
- Website: metaio.com Archived May 27, 2015, at the Wayback Machine

Metaio GmbH was a privately held augmented reality (AR) company that was acquired by Apple in May 2015. Headquartered in Munich, Germany, with subsidiaries in San Francisco, California, New York City, New York, and Dallas, Texas, Metaio provided a software development kit (SDK) for programming PC, web, mobile applications, and custom offline augmented reality applications. Additionally, Metaio was the creator of Junaio, a free mobile AR browser available for Android and iOS devices.

== History ==
Metaio was founded in 2003 by Günter Greiner, Peter Meier, and Thomas Alt, researchers at the Technical University of Munich. The company grew out of an internal project within Volkswagen that received a German grant. In 2005 Metaio released an AR application called KPS Click & Design in Germany, which allowed the user to put virtual furniture into an image of their living room. Metaio also released the Unifeye Platform, which third-party developers could use to create commercial AR products. In 2006, Metaio released a browser plug-in for web-based AR applications. Shortly thereafter, Metaio launched an AR application for mobile devices, Junaio. From 2010 to 2012, Metaio presented a tracking application for print and television on a consumer mobile device and as a result, won the ISMAR Tracking Contest in 2011.

Starting in 2006, Metaio has organized insideAR, an annual event for augmented reality developers, researchers, and businesses.

In May 2015, Metaio cancelled its upcoming conference and discontinued all sales of its products. On May 28, 2015, media outlets reported that Apple had bought the company, and finalized the purchase on May 21 or 22.

== Products ==
Metaio developed several augmented reality software tools, including the Metaio SDK, which enabled developers to build AR applications for mobile and desktop platforms. The company also created Junaio, a mobile augmented reality browser available on iOS and Android devices. Other products included Metaio Creator, a tool for designing AR experiences without programming, and Metaio Cloud, a platform for managing AR content.

== Awards ==
- Auggies Award for the "Best Campaign", 2014
- Volkswagen Augmented Reality Tracking Challenge, 2013
- ISMAR Best Poster, 2013
- Auggies Award for "Best AR Demo", 2012
- Augmented Planet Reader's Choice Award for "Best AR Marketing Campaign" and "Best AR Developer Toolkit" for the Metaio Mobile SDK, 2011
- Best Android AR App Ever – Second Place for "Best App Ever", 2011
- Augmented Planet Reader's Choice Award – Runner up for "Best Augmented Reality," 2010
- "Innovation Spreis Des Jahres" or "Innovation Award Of the Year "for "Virtual Dressing Room", 2010
- "I Caught Their Eye" Award, Winner in the Innovation for Tomorrow category, 2009
- First Prize at "Deutscher Internetpreis" (German Internet Award), 2007
