= Mercedes-Benz W201 =

Mercedes-Benz W201; (190, 190 E, 190 D)
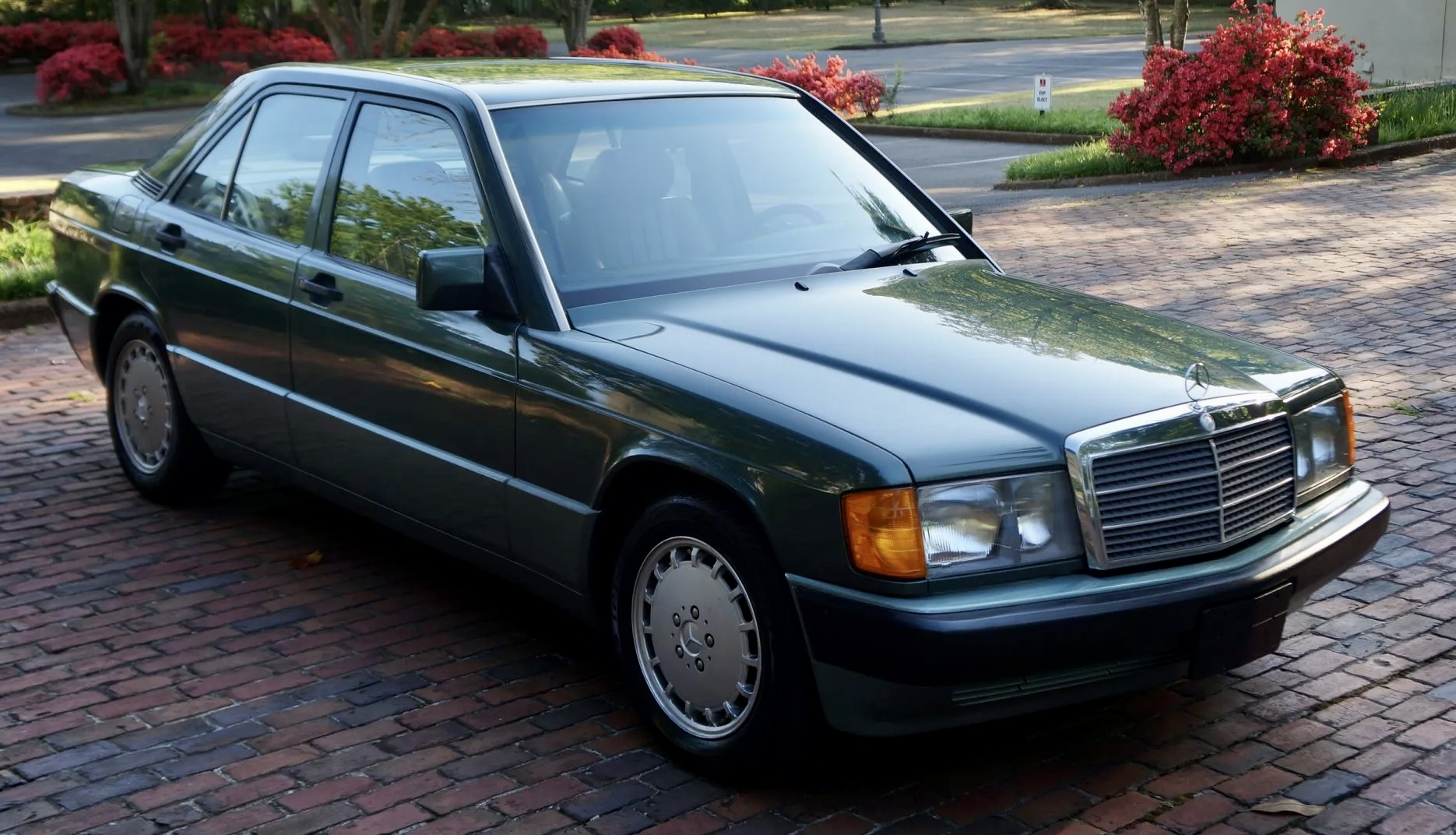
- 1993 190E 2.3

Overview
- Manufacturer: Daimler-Benz
- Production: 1983 – 1993; 1,874,668 produced
- Assembly: Germany: Bremen; Germany: Sindelfingen; Thailand: Thonburi (TAAP); South Africa: Pretoria (1992-1993)
- Designer: Peter Pfeiffer; Bruno Sacco (1979)

Body and chassis
- Class: Compact executive car (D)
- Body style: 4-door saloon
- Layout: Front-engine, rear-wheel-drive

Powertrain
- Engine: Petrol: 1.7 – 2.3 L M102 I4; 2.3 – 2.5 L M102 16V I4; 2.6 – 3.2 L M103 I6; Diesel: 2.0 – 2.2 L OM601 I4; 2.5 L OM602 I5; 2.5 L OM602 turbo I5
- Transmission: 4-speed manual; 5-speed manual; 4-speed 4G-Tronic automatic

Dimensions
- Wheelbase: 2,665 mm (104.9 in)
- Length: 1982–88: 4,420 mm (174.0 in); 1988–93: 4,448 mm (175.1 in)
- Width: 1982–88: 1,678 mm (66.1 in); 1988–93: 1,690 mm (66.5 in)
- Height: 1982–88: 1,390 mm (54.7 in); 1988–93: 1,375 mm (54.1 in)
- Curb weight: 1,110–1,300 kg (2,447–2,866 lb)

Chronology
- Successor: Mercedes-Benz C-Class (W202)

The Mercedes-Benz W201 is the internal designation for the Mercedes 190 series sedans, a range of front-engine, rear drive, five passenger, four-door sedans manufactured over a single generation, from 1983 to 1993 as the company's first compact class automobile.

Designed by Bruno Sacco, head of styling at Mercedes-Benz from 1975 to 1999, the W201 debuted at the 1982 Paris Motor Show. Manufactured in both Bremen and Sindelfingen, Germany, production reached 1,879,629 over its eleven-year model life.

The W201 introduced a 5-link rear suspension subsequently used in E and C class models, front and rear anti-roll bars, anti-dive and anti-squat geometry—as well as airbags, ABS brakes and seatbelt pretensioners. Its extensive use of light-weight high-strength steel enabled it to withstand a concrete barrier offset crash at 35 mph (56 km/h) without serious passenger injury or cabin deformation.

Mercedes introduced a performance variant, marketed as the 190 E 2.3-16V, at the 1983 Frankfurt Motor Show.

== Background ==
From January 1974 to January 1982, Mercedes spent over £600 million researching and developing the W201, subsequently saying it was 'massively over-engineered'. The company began testing early prototypes in 1978, with final styling approved on 6 March 1979. The first prototypes based on that design were tested later that year, with pilot production beginning in February 1982, following engineering sign-off. The W201-based 190 was unveiled on 8 December 1982, and launched in Germany on 9 December 1982. It was marketed in right-hand drive for the UK market from September 1983.

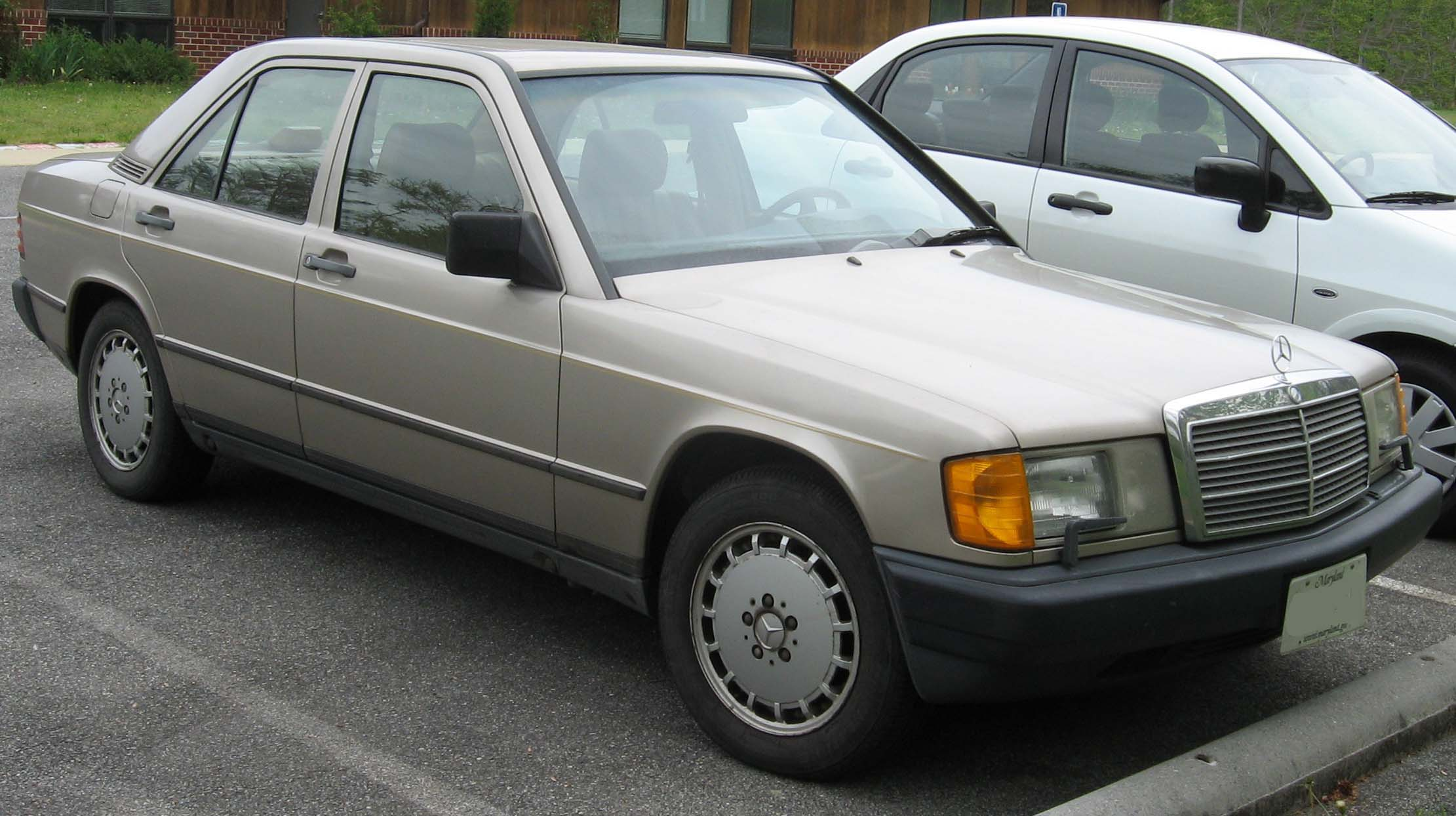
1987 Mercedes-Benz 190 E 2.3 (US)

When difficulties prevented Daimler from manufacturing the W201 in Bremen, production began in Sindelfingen at a capacity of just 140,000 units per year. Bremen was subsequently cleared for W201 production, replacing the commercial production.

The 190 E (E for Einspritzung, or Fuel Injection) model uses the Bosch KE-Jetronic Multi-Point Fuel Injection to meter fuel instead of the carburetor of 190 models. Thanks to their fuel injection system and larger intake and exhaust valves, 190 E models made more power than non-fuel injected 190 models. In April 1990, the carbureted 190 was discontinued and replaced by a fuel injected, 1.8-liter version at the bottom of the range.

For the 1991 model year, the W201 received light exterior modifications. For instance, the door frames were now painted body color rather than being anodized black as before. The last Mercedes-Benz 190E was manufactured on 17 May 1993.

== Petrol models ==
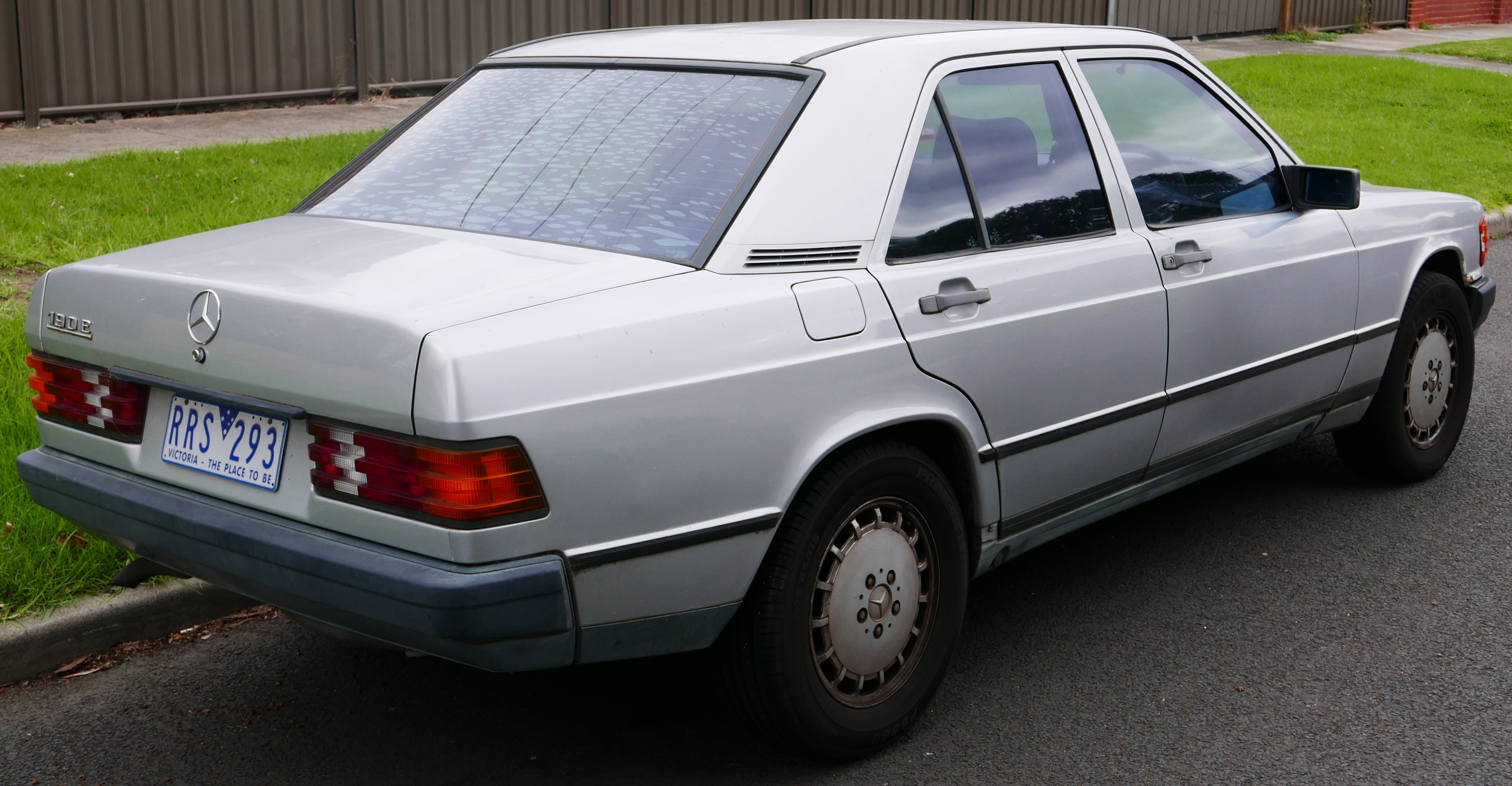
1985 Mercedes-Benz 190 E (Australia)

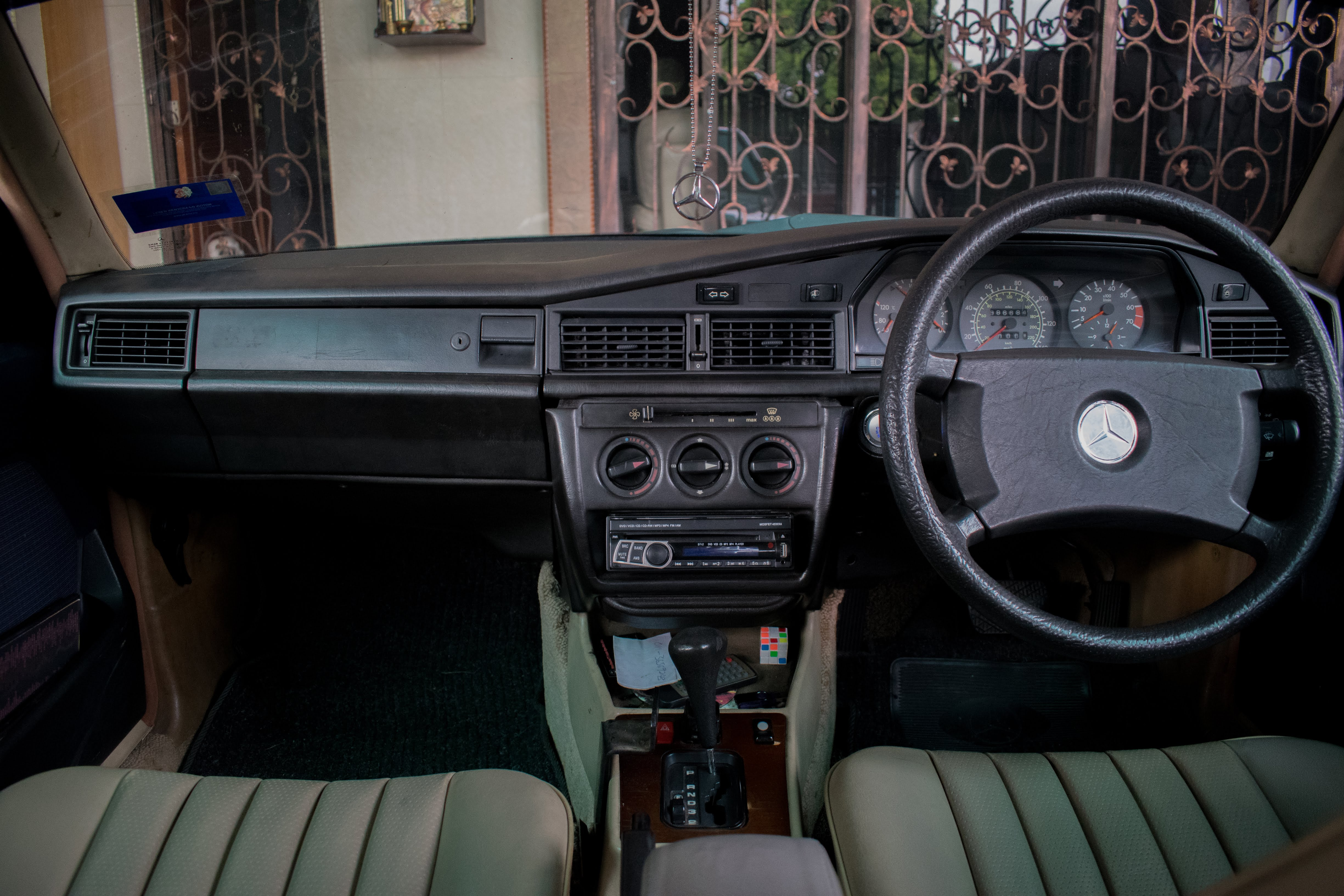
1985 Mercedes-Benz 190 E interior

In 1982, the first available models were the 190 and 190 E. Each was fitted with an M102 1,997 cc (2.0 L) inline-4 engine. The 190 was fitted with an M102.921 engine producing 90 PS (66 kW; 89 hp) and the 190 E fitted with an M102.962 engine producing 120 PS (88 kW; 118 hp). In September 1983, the 190 E 2.3 (2,299 cc) was launched for the North American market only (although 190 E 2.3 was available for purchase in other countries later), fitted with a 113 hp (84 kW; 115 PS) M102.961 engine. This reduction in power was due to the emissions standards in the North American market at the time. The intake manifold, camshaft, and fuel injection system were refined in 1984, and the engine produced 122 PS (90 kW; 120 hp). The carbureted 190 was revised in 1984 as well, receiving a power increase to 105 PS (77 kW; 104 hp). 1984 also saw the arrival of the 2.3-16 "Cosworth" variant.

In 1985, the 190 E 2.3 now came fitted with the M102.985 engine, producing 132 PS (97 kW; 130 hp) until it was revised in 1987, now using the Bosch KE3-Jetronic Injection system, a different ignition system, and a higher compression ratio, producing 136 PS (100 kW; 134 hp).

The Frankfurt International Motor Show in September 1985 also marked the arrival of the first 190 equipped with an Inline-six engine. Fitted with a M103.940 engine, the 190 E 2.6 had a maximum power output of 160 PS (118 kW; 158 hp) with a catalytic converter and 166 PS (122 kW; 164 hp) without it. In the North American market, the 190 E 2.6 was sold until 1993, the end of the W201's production run. From 1992–1993 the 2.6 was available as a special "Sportline" model, with an upgraded suspension and interior. The 190 E 2.3 was sold until 1988, then went on a brief hiatus until it was sold again from 1991 until 1993.

In 1990, Mercedes Benz phased out the carburetor-equipped 190, replacing it with fuel-injected 190E 1.8. This model utilised a 1,797 cc (1.8 L) M102.910 engine, with the same bore but shorter stroke than the M102.962, and produced the same 80 kW (109 PS; 107 hp) power output as the outgoing 190 model, albeit with only 150 N⋅m (111 lbf⋅ft) torque.

== Diesel models ==
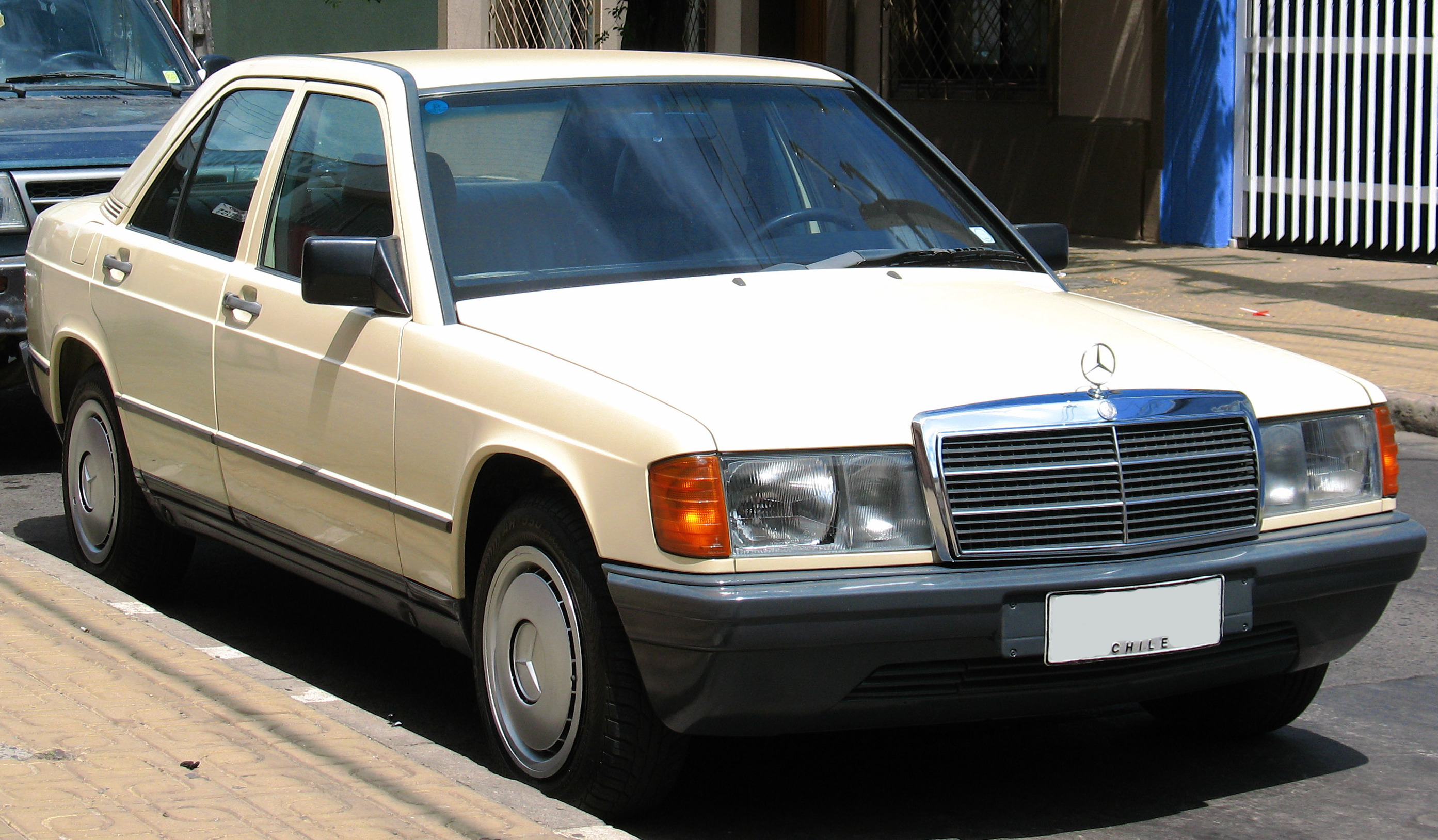
Mercedes 190 D

The 190 D was available with three different engines. The 2.0 L inline-four engine was the base engine, and was never marketed in North America. A 2.2-liter version, with the same power as the 2.0 L, was introduced in September 1983. It was only available in model years 1984 and 1985, and only in the US and Canada. The 2.5 L inline-five engine was available in the late 1980s and early 1990s. The 2.5 L Turbo engine, sold in mainland Europe, but not the UK for many years, was available to American buyers only in 1987 and is now somewhat of a collector's item. The exterior of the 2.5 Turbo model is different from other models in that it has fender vents in the front passenger-side fender to feed air to the turbocharger.

== Limited editions ==
=== 190 LE ===
For the UK and Irish market, a special edition 190 was produced for the 1993 model year. The car was given the badge name 190LE, though on the rear boot lid it read 190 E (on the left hand side of the lock) and LE on the right hand side. Roughly 1,000 cars were produced and each one came with a large A3 sized certificate giving each car a unique number.

The 190 LE was available in three colours only; Azzuro Blue (blue/purple), Brilliant Silver and Rosso Red (Burgundy). The Azzuro blue coloured cars came with a grey checked cloth interior, the silver coloured cars with a black checked cloth interior and the Rosso Red coloured cars with a biscuit/cream checked cloth interior.

The LE was equipped with extra features that had been options on the other models and were only available with the 1.8 or 2.0-litre engine. Both the 1.8 and 2.0-litre models were equipped with a standard electric tilt and slide steel sunroof, four electric windows, electric aerial, 8-hole alloy wheels, Blaupunkt Verona CR43 Radio/cassette player and walnut wood trim (as opposed to Zebrano wood). The 2.0-litre version had in addition rear headrests and a front armrest. The LE was nearly £3,500 cheaper than a 1.8-litre model of identical specification, and £2,000 cheaper than a 2.0-litre model.

No further options could be added to LE cars from the factory - though some were equipped with other dealer-installed items.

=== 180 E ===
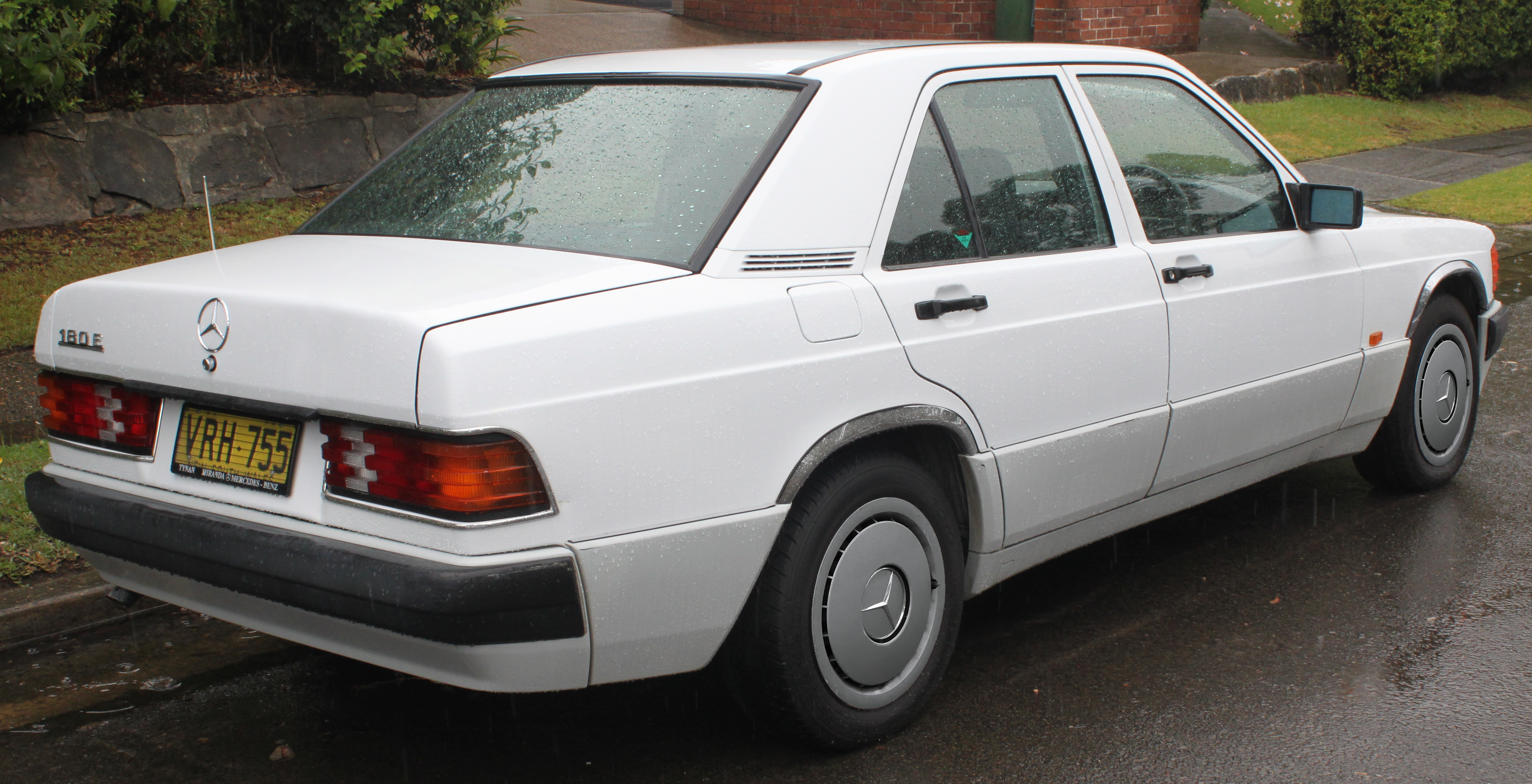
1991 Mercedes-Benz 180 E Limited Edition (Australia)

In Australia, a limited run of 180 E Limited Edition cars could be purchased from October 1991 to March 1994. This was essentially a 1.8-litre 190 E with a very basic trim. At its launch, Mercedes-Benz were able to price the 180 E at A$45,450, compared to the 190 E at A$63,200. This was achieved by taking out equipment and also by offsetting import duties with the now discontinued policy of export credits gained through using Australian-made components for the whole Mercedes-Benz range, such as suspension springs and windscreen glass. The 180 E deleted anti-lock brakes, power windows, climate control, electric seats, heated mirrors, cruise control and multi-speaker sound system; although power steering, air conditioning and central locking remained standard.

=== 190 E Limited Edition ===
In 1993, for the U.S. market, 2 LE models were offered, limited to 1,400 units (700 190 E 2.3 LE and 700 190 E 2.6 LE). Both the 2.3 and 2.6 Limited Editions had a rear badge deletion meaning that the "190E" and "2.3" or "2.6" chrome badges on the trunk lid were not added. The 2.3 LE was only offered in Emerald Green while the 2.6 was only offered in Black. The 2.3 litre were only produced in Brilliant Emerald Pearl color. The 2.3 LE comes with 15-inch 8-hole alloy wheels, cream beige leather upholstery, burl walnut trim on the entire dash, fully electric front seats, rear headrests, and headlamp wipers with a washing system. The 2.6 litre Black Sportline included Recaro seats with red inserts and red piping, rear matching headrests, carbon fiber trim, Sportline gear shift, a sportier steering wheel, headlight wipers, low profile tires, eight spoke rims, and a Sportline tuned suspension which added tighter handling and lowered the car by a quarter inch. The suspension was the same suspension as the 190E Cosworth.

=== 190 E 1.7 ===
From May 1992 until August 1993, a special version was made to suit Portugal's tax rates which were based on engine displacement, with a major tax threshold at 1,750 cc (106.8 cu in). This car was fitted with the M102.919 motor, which had a reduced (sleeved) cylinder bore to 87.5 mm (3.44 in), reducing the displacement to 1,737 cc and power to 107 PS (79 kW). The car was produced as a completely knocked-down 190E 1.8 which was then manually retrofitted with the reduced displacement engines, hence why no separate production figures exist.

== 190 E 2.3-16 and 2.5-16 ==
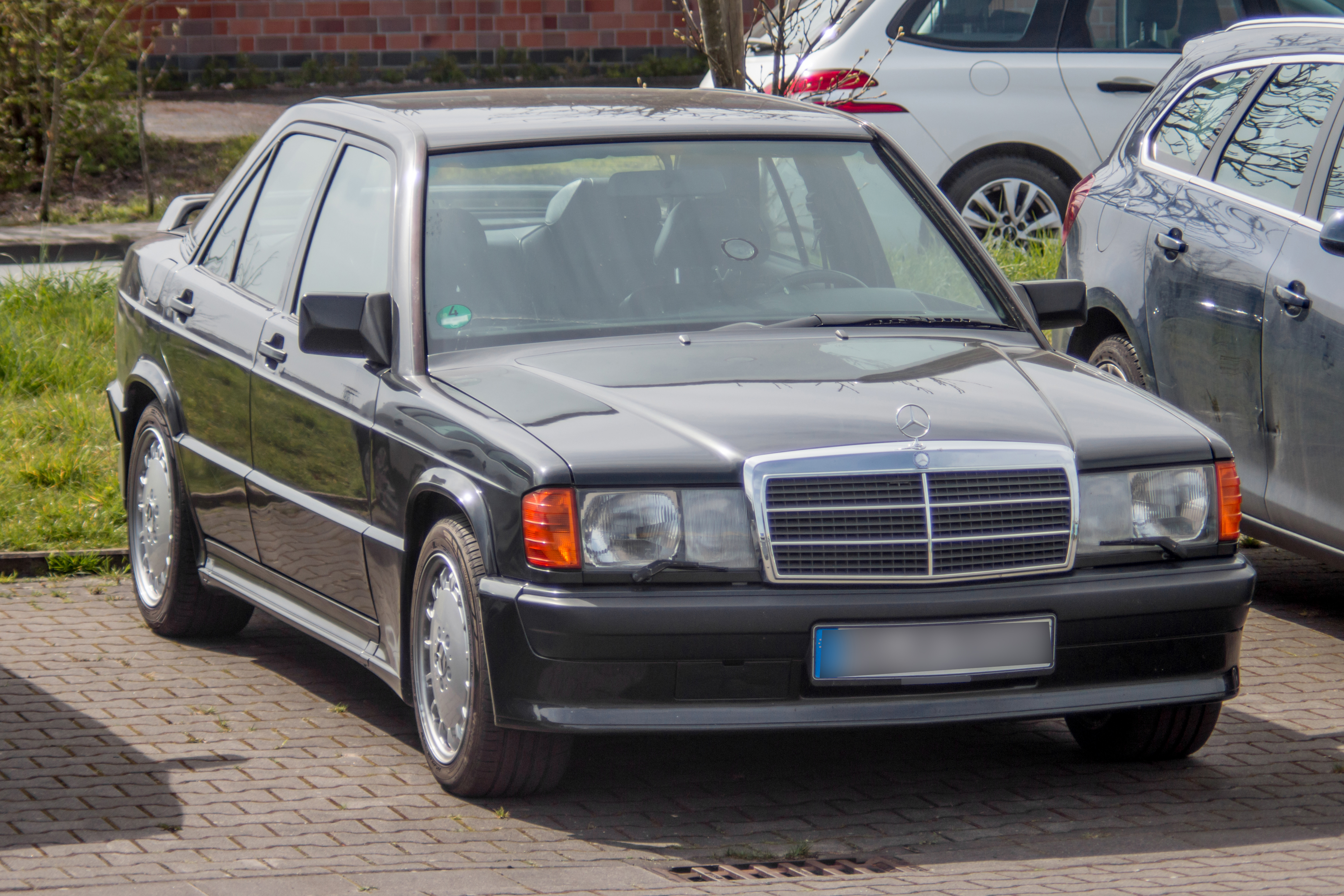
Mercedes-Benz W 201 2.5-16

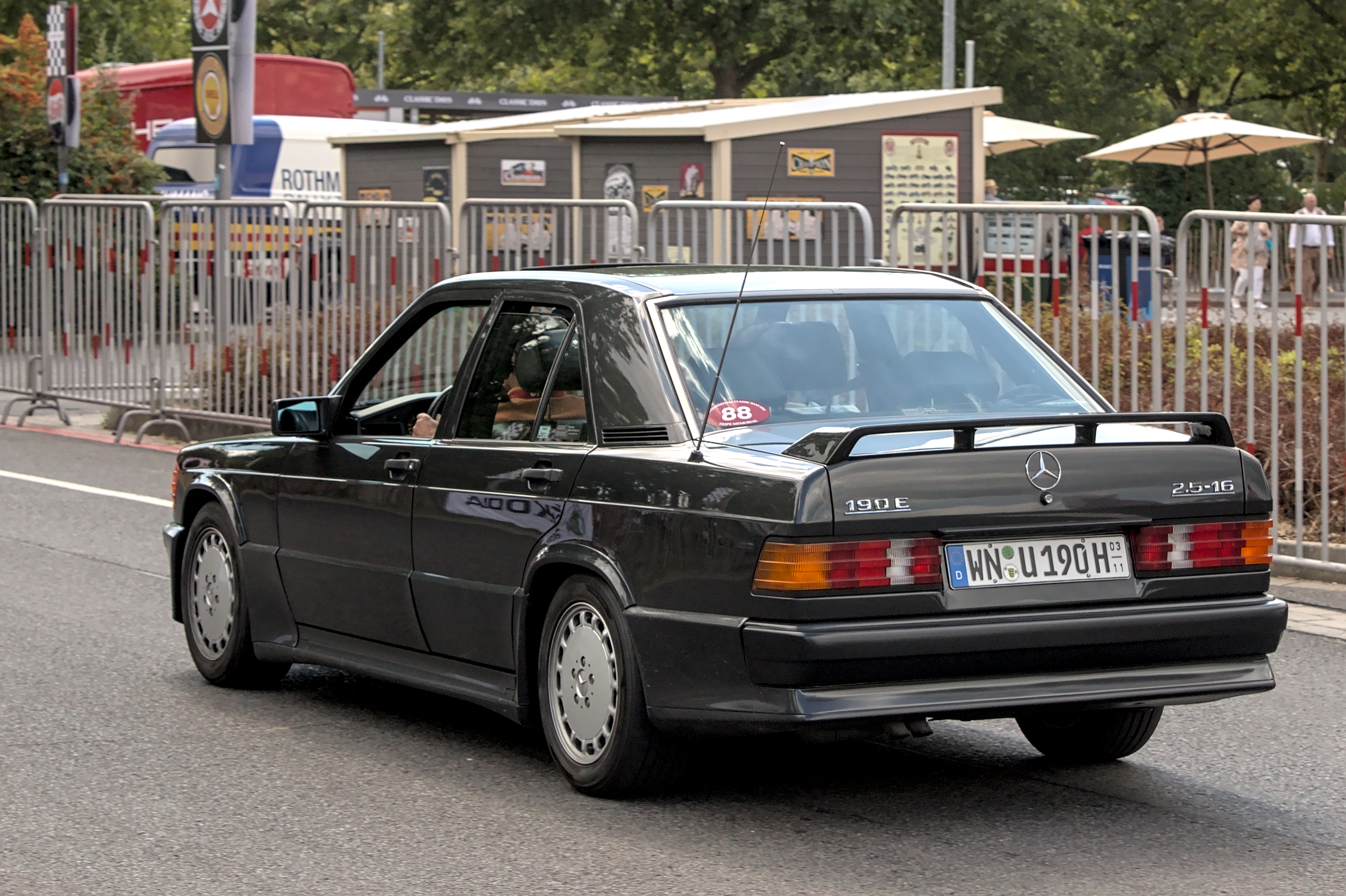
Mercedes-Benz W 201 2.5-16 (rear view)

In the late 1970s, Mercedes competed in rallying with the big V8-powered Coupés of the R107 Series, mainly the light-weight Mercedes 450 SLC 5.0. Mercedes wished to take the 190 E rallying, and asked British engineering company Cosworth to develop an engine with 320 hp (239 kW; 324 PS) for the rally car. This project was known as project WAA by Cosworth. During this time, the Audi Quattro with its all-wheel drive system and a turbocharged engine was launched, making the 2.3-16 appear outclassed. With a continued desire to compete in motorsports with the 190, and also now an engine to do it with, Mercedes turned to the Deutsche Tourenwagen Meisterschaft (DTM) (German Touring Car Championship) motor sport series instead. Cars racing in this championship, however, had to be based on a roadgoing model. Mercedes therefore had to put into series production a 190 fitted with a detuned version of the Cosworth engine. The performance model was known as the 190 E 2.3-16, and debuted in September at the 1983 Frankfurt Motor Show, after its reputation had already been established. Three cars, only slightly cosmetically altered, had set three world records in August at the Nardo testing facility in Italy, recording a combined average speed of 154.06 mph (247.94 km/h) over the 50,000 km endurance test, and establishing twelve international endurance records.

=== Engine ===
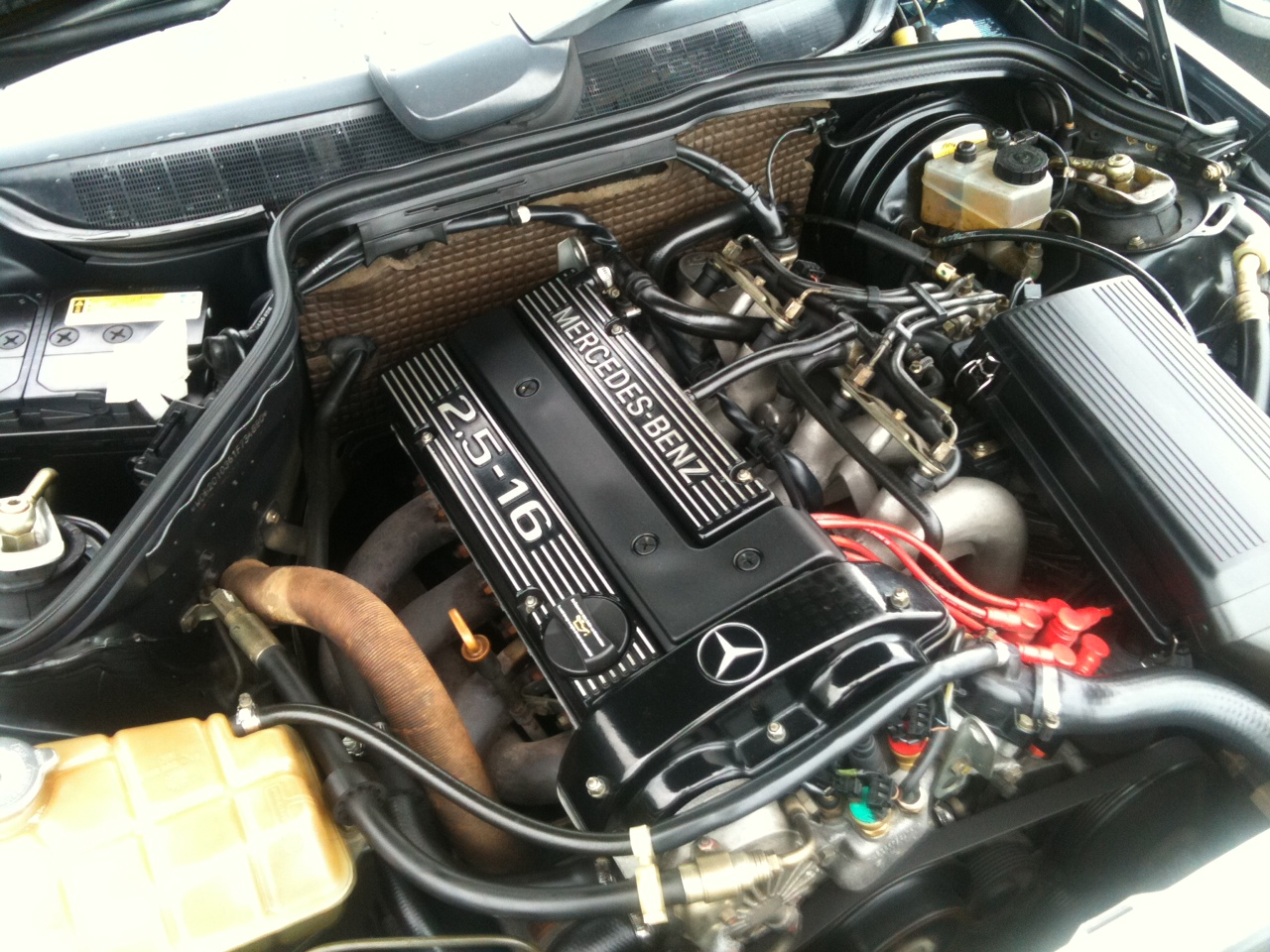
2.5-16

The Cosworth engine was based on the M102 four cylinder 2.3-litre 8-valve unit producing 136 hp (101 kW; 138 PS), already fitted to the 190 and E-Class. Cosworth developed the cylinder head. It was made from light alloy using Cosworth's unique casting process and brought with it dual overhead camshafts and four valves per cylinder, meaning 16 valves total which were developed to be the "largest that could practically be fitted into the combustion chamber".

In roadgoing trim, the 2.3 L 16-valve engine generated a maximum power output of 183 hp (136 kW) at 6,200 rpm and 174 lb⋅ft (236 N⋅m) at 4,500 rpm. The oversquare 95.50 x 80.25 mm bore and stroke dimensions ensured that the car could easily rev up to the 7,000 rpm redline. Acceleration from 0–100 km/h (62 mph) was in less than eight seconds, and the top speed was 230 km/h (143 mph).

US-Specification cars had a slightly reduced compression ratio (9.7:1 instead of 10.5:1), and were rated at 167 hp (125 kW; 169 PS) at 5,800 rpm and 162 lb⋅ft (220 N⋅m) at 4,750 rpm.

The road-going version of the engine was reconfigured with reduced inlet and exhaust port sizes, different camshaft profiles, no dry sump configuration and Bosch K-Jetronic replacing the specialised Kugelfischer fuel injection. These changes helped bring power down to the required 183 bhp (136 kW) specification, but still resulted in a "remarkably flexible engine, with a very flat torque curve and a wide power band". The heads for the engines were cast at Cosworth's Coscast foundry in Worcester and sent to Germany to be fitted to the rest of the engine, parts of which were different from the standard 2.3-litre engine including light pressed alloy pistons, and rings designed to withstand higher engine speeds, whilst con-rods, bearings and bearing caps were found to be strong enough as standard and left unaltered.

==== 16V AMG power pack ====
Available only to 2.5-16 and Evolution I models, the optional AMG Power Pack increased power to 224 hp (167 kW; 227 PS) at 7,200 rpm and torque to 181 lb⋅ft (245 N⋅m) at 5,000 rpm, while pushing the top speed up to 250 km/h (155 mph). In their final incarnations, these engines produced up to 350 bhp (261 kW) in racing tune.

=== 2.5 L model ===
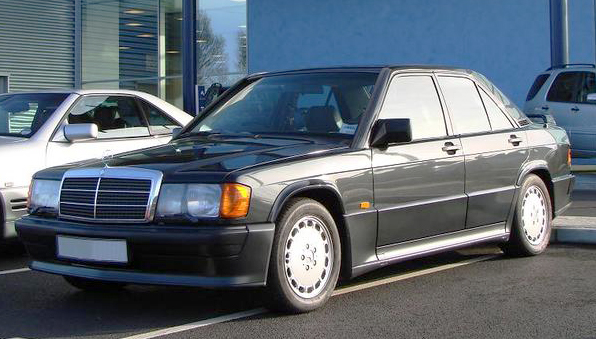
1990 Mercedes-Benz 190E 2.5-16V (UK)

An enlarged 2.5 L engine replaced the 2.3 L in 1988. It offered double-row timing chains to fix the easily snapping single chains on early 2.3 engines, and increased peak output by 19 hp (14 kW) with a slight increase in torque. For the European market, the car delivered up to 204 PS (150 kW; 201 hp) without a catalytic converter (but prepared for retrofitting one, called "RÜF"). Catalytic converter cars equipped with the 2.5-litre 16V engine generated a slightly reduced power output of 195 PS (143 kW; 192 hp). Cosworth also list the project code "WAB" for the development of the 2.5-16-valve head just as they do for the 2.3-16-valve head.

=== 16v differences ===
Due to their performance, the 16-valve cars were different from the other 190 models. The body kit on the 2.3-16 and 2.5-16 reduced the drag coefficient to 0.32, one of the lowest CD values on a four-door saloon of the time, whilst also reducing lift at speed. The steering ratio was quicker and the steering wheel smaller than that on other 190s, whilst the fuel tank was enlarged from 55 to 70 L. The Getrag 5-speed manual gearbox was unique to the 16-valve and featured a dog-leg change pattern, shifting left and down for first. The gearchange quality was, however, noted as "notchy, balky", criticisms which weren't levelled at the BMW M3 (E30) which shared the same gearbox. An oil cooler was fitted to ensure sufficient oil cooling for the inevitable track use many of these cars were destined for.

The strictly four-seater interior had standard sport size seats with strong side bolsters for front and rear passengers. Three extra dials - an oil temperature gauge, stopwatch and voltmeter - were included in the centre console. The 190 E 2.3-16 was available in only two colours, Blue-Black metallic (Pearl Black in the US), and Smoke Silver. The 2.5-16 added Almandine Red and Astral Silver.

All 2.3-16-valve 190 models are fitted with a limited-slip differential (LSD) as standard. They were also available with Mercedes' ASD system which was standard equipment on the 2.5-16v. The ASD is an electronically controlled, hydraulically locking differential which activates automatically when required. The electronic control allows varied amounts of differential lock from the standard 15% right up to 100%. It is not a traction control system however, and can only maximize traction rather than prevent wheel spin. Activation of the ASD system is indicated by an illuminating amber triangle in the speedometer.

The suspension on 16-valve models is modified from the standard 190 (W201). As well as being lower and stiffer, it has quicker dampers, larger anti-roll bars, harder bushings and hydraulic Self-levelling suspension (SLS) on the rear. This allows the rear ride height to remain constant even when the car is fully loaded.

The 1984 Nürburgring Race of Champions, featuring current and former F1 drivers at the wheel of identical 190 E's, was held at the inauguration of the new, shorter Nürburgring. A then unknown Ayrton Senna took first place.

Private Teams such as AMG later entered the 2.3-16 in touring cars races, especially the DTM. In the late 1980s, the 2.5-16 (never released in the United States) raced many times, against the similar BMW M3 and even the turbocharged Ford Sierra RS Cosworth.

== Evolution models ==
=== Evolution I ===
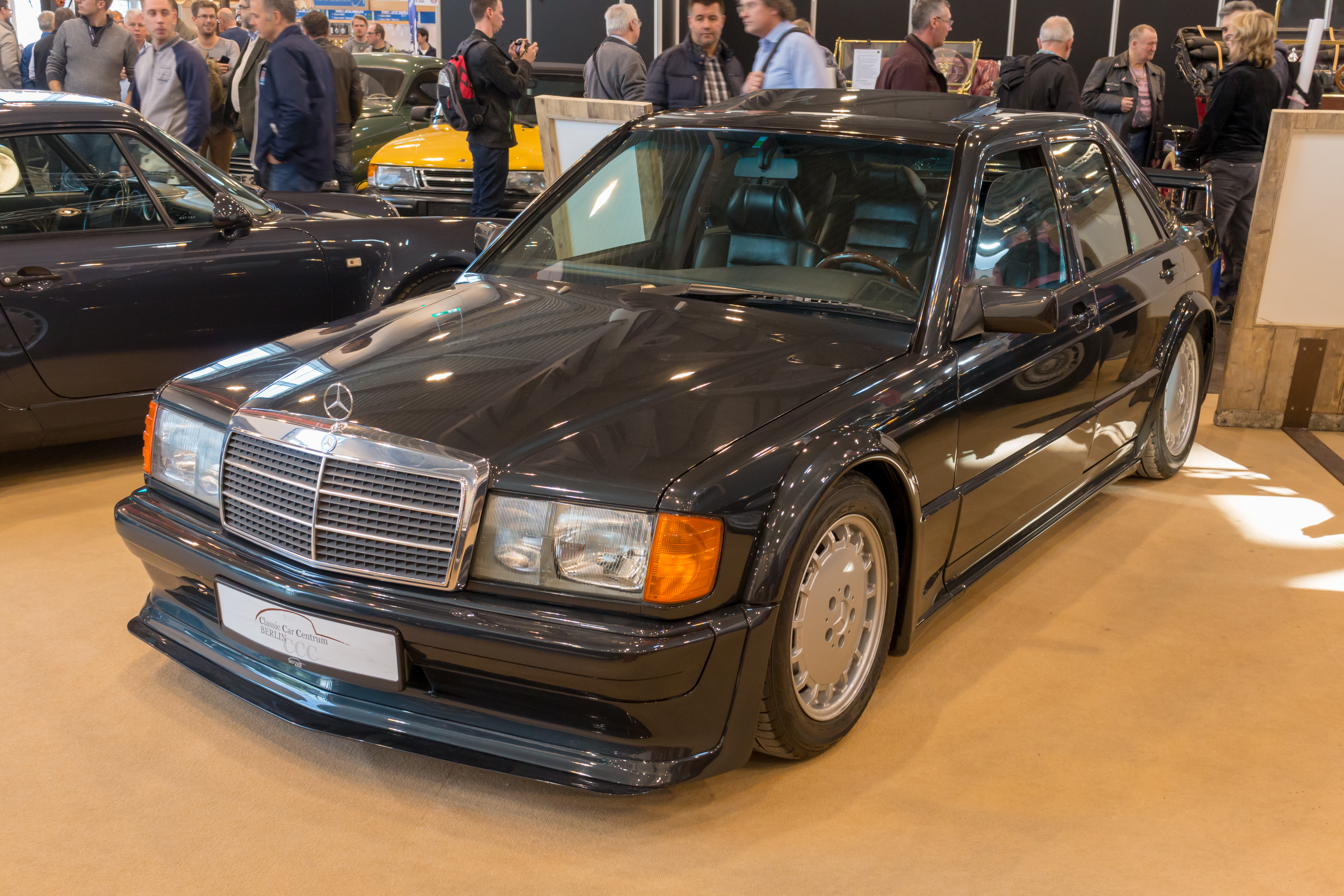
190 E 2.5-16 Evolution I

With the debut of the BMW M3 Evolution 2 in March 1988, the 190 E's direct competitor, it became obvious that the 2.5-16 needed a boost in power in order to remain competitive. In March 1989, the 190 E 2.5-16 Evolution debuted at the Geneva Auto Show. The Evo I, as it came to be called, had a new rear spoiler and wider wheel arches. Many changes were made to under-the-skin components such as brakes and suspension. The car featured an adjustable suspension system allowing the ride height to be adjusted from an interior switch. All were intended to allow the Evolution cars to be even more effective around a track.

The Evo I's power output is similar to the 195 or 204 PS (143 or 150 kW; 192 or 201 hp) of the "regular" 2.5-16. However, it had a redesigned engine of similar capacity but most importantly, a shorter stroke and bigger bore which would allow for a higher rev limit and improved generation of power. Additional changes stretch to improved rotating mass, improved lubrication system along with improved cam timing. Cosworth also list a project code "WAC" for the development of the short-stroke Evolution engine.

Only 502 units of the Evolution model were produced for homologation in compliance with the DTM rules. For those customers desiring even more performance, a PowerPack option engineered by AMG was available for DM 18,000. The PowerPack option included improved camshafts, a larger diameter throttle body, more responsive ignition and fuel management system as well as improved intake and exhaust systems - it was only offered with twin, metal catalytic converters rather than the single ceramic one used in the regular 2.5. The net result was an increase in power by 30 hp (22 kW) over the standard car, bringing the total to 225 PS (165 kW; 222 hp).

=== Evolution II ===
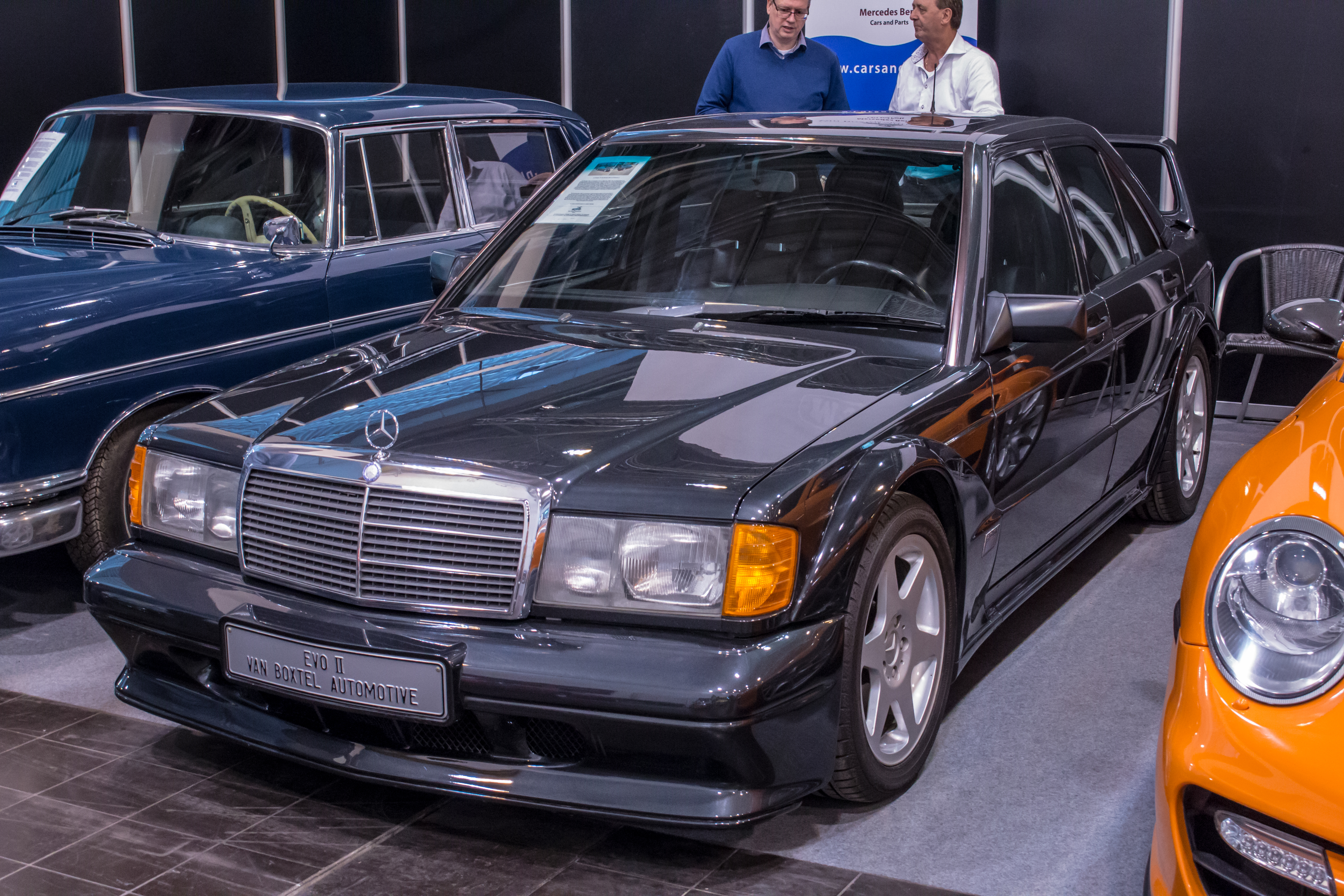
Mercedes-Benz 190 E 2.5-16 Evolution II

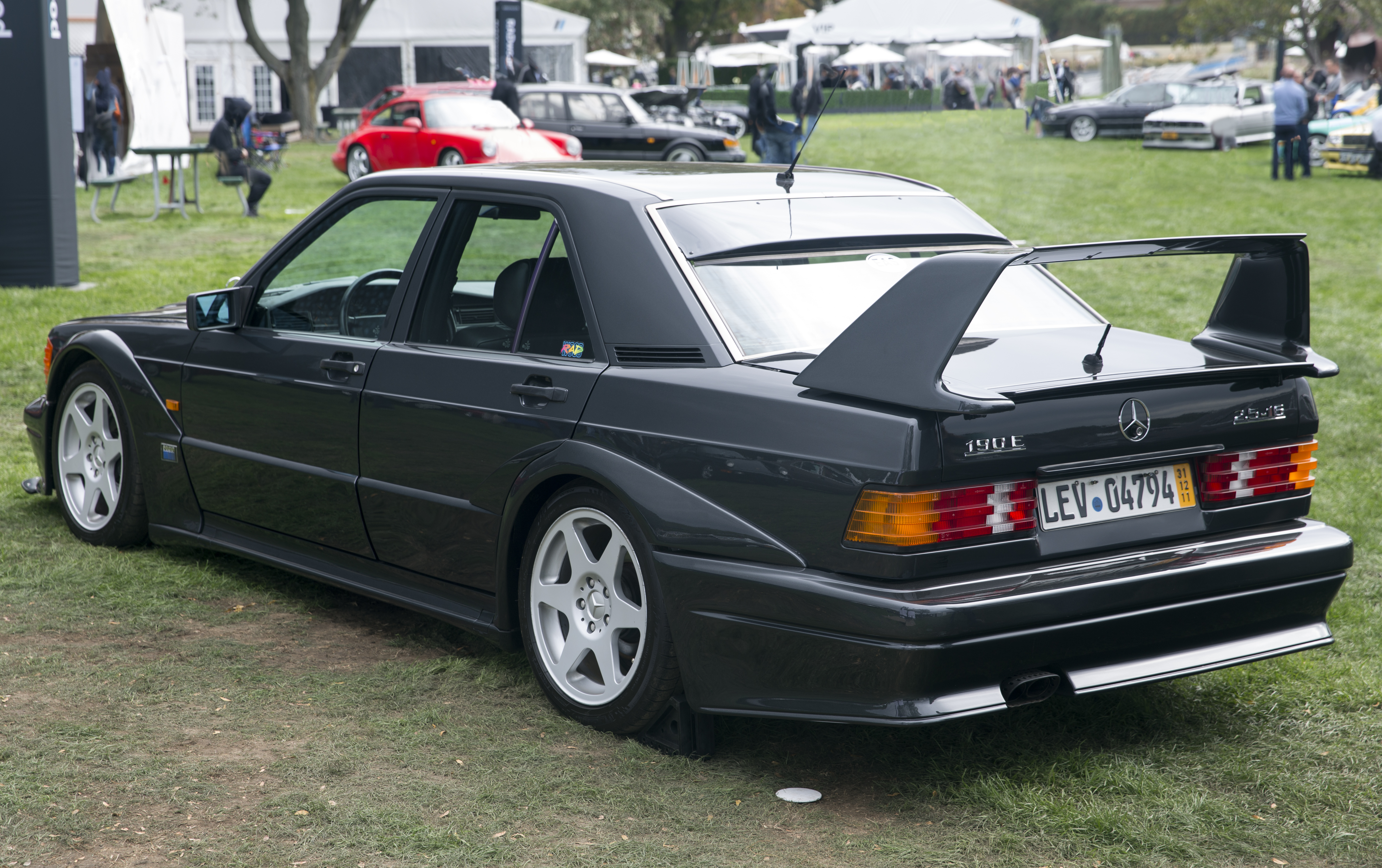
Rear view showing the rear spoiler and rear window spoiler

In March 1990, at the Geneva Auto Show, the 190 E 2.5-16 Evolution II was shown. With the success of the first Evolution model, this model's 502-unit production was already sold before it was unveiled. This car retailed in 1990 for DM 136,720.

The "Evo II" included the AMG PowerPack fitted to the same short-stroke 2,463 cc (2.5 L) inline-four engine as the Evolution, producing a maximum power output of 235 PS (173 kW; 232 hp) at 7,200 rpm and 245 N⋅m (181 lb⋅ft) of torque at 5,000 rpm, as well as a full SLS adjustable suspension allowing the ride height to be adjusted from an interior switch. An obvious modification to the Evolution II was the radical body kit (designed by Prof. Richard Eppler from the University of Stuttgart) with a large adjustable rear wing, rear window spoiler, and Evolution II 17-inch alloy wheels. The kit served an aerodynamic purpose—it was wind tunnel tested to reduce drag to 0.29, while at the same time increasing downforce. Period anecdotes tell of BMW research and development chief, Wolfgang Reitzle, saying "the laws of aerodynamics must be different between Munich and Stuttgart; if that rear wing works, we'll have to redesign our wind tunnel." The anecdote claims that BMW did redesign its wind tunnel afterwards.

500 examples were painted in "blauschwarz" blue/black metallic; the last two examples, numbers 501 and 502, were painted in astral silver making them the rarest of the Evolution models. The Evo II had the shortest production run of the 190 series models with production starting in 1990 and ending in 1991.

== Technical parameters ==
=== Model history ===
Chassis code	Model	Engine	Years	Numbers built	Comment
Petrol engine models
201.018	190 E 1.7	1.7 L M102.919 I4	05.1992–08.1993	173 353	Export model for Portugal only
201.018	190 E 1.8	1.8 L M102.910 I4	03.1990–08.1993	173 353	Badged as "180 E" in Australia
201.022	190	2.0 L M102.921 I4	10.1982–09.1984	35 021	
201.023	190	2.0 L M102.924 I4	08.1984–01.1991	83 540	
201.024	190 E	2.0 L M102.962 I4	10.1982–01.1991	638 180	
201.024	190 E 2.0	2.0 L M102.962 I4	01.1991–08.1993	638 180	
201.024	190 E 2.3	2.3 L M102.961 I4	09.1983–09.1985	186 610	Export model to North America until 09.1986
201.028	190 E 2.3	2.3 L M102.985 I4	09.1985–08.1993	186 610	Export model to North America until 09.1986
201.029	190 E 2.6	2.6 L M103.942 I6	04.1986–08.1993	104 907	
201.034	190 E 2.3 -16	2.3 L M102.983 I4 DOHC	09.1984–06.1988	19 487	
201.035	190 E 2.5 -16	2.5 L M102.990 I4 DOHC	07.1988–08.1993	5 743	
201.035	190 E 2.5 -16 Evolution	2.5 L M102.991 I4 DOHC	03.1989–05.1989	502	
201.036	190 E 2.5 -16 Evolution II	2.5 L M102.992 I4 DOHC	05.1990–07.1990	502	
Diesel engine models
201.122	190 D	2.0 L OM601.911 Diesel I4	11.1983–08.1993	452 806	
201.122	190 D 2.2	2.2 L OM601.921 Diesel I4	11.1983–08.1985	10 560	Export model to North America only
201.125	190 D 2.5	2.5 L OM602.911 Diesel I5	06.1985–08.1993	147 502	
201.128	190 D 2.5 Turbo	2.5 L OM602.961 Turbo Diesel I5	02.1986–08.1993	20 915	Export model to North America until 08.1987

=== Engines ===
Displacement (cc)	Type	Configuration	Power	Max Speed	Model	Notes
1,997	Carb	I4 8V	90 PS (66 kW; 89 hp)	109 mph (175 km/h)	190	
1,997	Carb	I4 8V	105 PS (77 kW; 104 hp)	115 mph (185 km/h)	190	
1,737	Inj	I4 8V	107 PS (79 kW; 106 hp)	115 mph (185 km/h)	190 E 1.7	Export model for Portugal only
1,797	Inj	I4 8V	109 PS (80 kW; 108 hp)	115 mph (185 km/h)	190 E 1.8	Badged as "180 E" in Australia
1,997	Inj	I4 8V	122 PS (90 kW; 120 hp)	122 mph (196 km/h)	190 E, 190 E 2.0	
2,298	Inj	I4 8V	136 PS (100 kW; 134 hp)	124 mph (200 km/h)	190 E 2.3	
2,597	Inj	I6 12V	166 PS (122 kW; 164 hp)	133 mph (214 km/h)	190 E 2.6	
2,299	Inj	I4 16V	185 PS (136 kW; 182 hp)	143 mph (230 km/h)	190 E 2.3-16	
2,299	Inj RÜF	I4 16V	177 PS (130 kW; 175 hp)	140 mph (225 km/h)	190 E 2.3-16	Rüstungsfertig, prepared for catalytic converter installation
2,299	Inj KAT	I4 16V	170 PS (125 kW; 168 hp)	137 mph (220 km/h)	190 E 2.3-16	
2,498	Inj RÜF	I4 16V	204 PS (150 kW; 201 hp)	146 mph (235 km/h)	190 E 2.5-16	without catalytic
2,498	Inj KAT	I4 16V	194 PS (143 kW; 191 hp)	143 mph (230 km/h)	190 E 2.5-16	
2,498/2,463	Inj	I4 16V AMG p/p	225 PS (165 kW; 222 hp)	152 mph (245 km/h)	190 E 2.5-16	without catalytic
2,463	Inj KAT	I4 16V Evolution	194 PS (143 kW; 191 hp)	143 mph (230 km/h)	190 E 2.5-16 Evolution I	
2,463	Inj	I4 16V Evolution II	235 PS (173 kW; 232 hp)	155 mph (249 km/h)	190 E 2.5-16 Evolution II	without catalytic
1,997	Diesel	I4 8V	72 PS (53 kW; 71 hp)	100 mph (161 km/h)	190 D (2.0)	
1,997	Diesel	I4 8V	75 PS (55 kW; 74 hp)	100 mph (161 km/h)	190 D (2.0)	
2,199	Diesel	I4 8V	73 PS (54 kW; 72 hp)	100 mph (161 km/h)	190 D 2.2	Export model for United States only
2,497	Diesel	I5 10V	94 PS (69 kW; 93 hp)	109 mph (175 km/h)	190 D 2.5	
2,497	Turbo Diesel	I5 10V	122 PS (90 kW; 120 hp)	119 mph (192 km/h)	190 D 2.5 Turbo	not marketed in right hand drive form for the UK

=== Transmissions ===
Models	4-speed manual	5-speed manual	4-speed automatic
190, 190 E, 190 E 1.8, 190 E 2.0, 190 D 2.0	Standard	Optional*	Optional
190 E 2.3, 190 E 2.6, 190 D 2.5	N/A	Standard	Optional
190 E 2.3-16, 190 E 2.5-16	N/A	Standard**	Optional
190 D 2.5 Turbo	N/A	Standard***	Optional***

* Since August 1983. ** Getrag's dog-leg. ***automatic standard until 09/1989, no manual available until then. From 09/1989 on, 5-speed manual standard and automatic optional. See

== AMG models ==
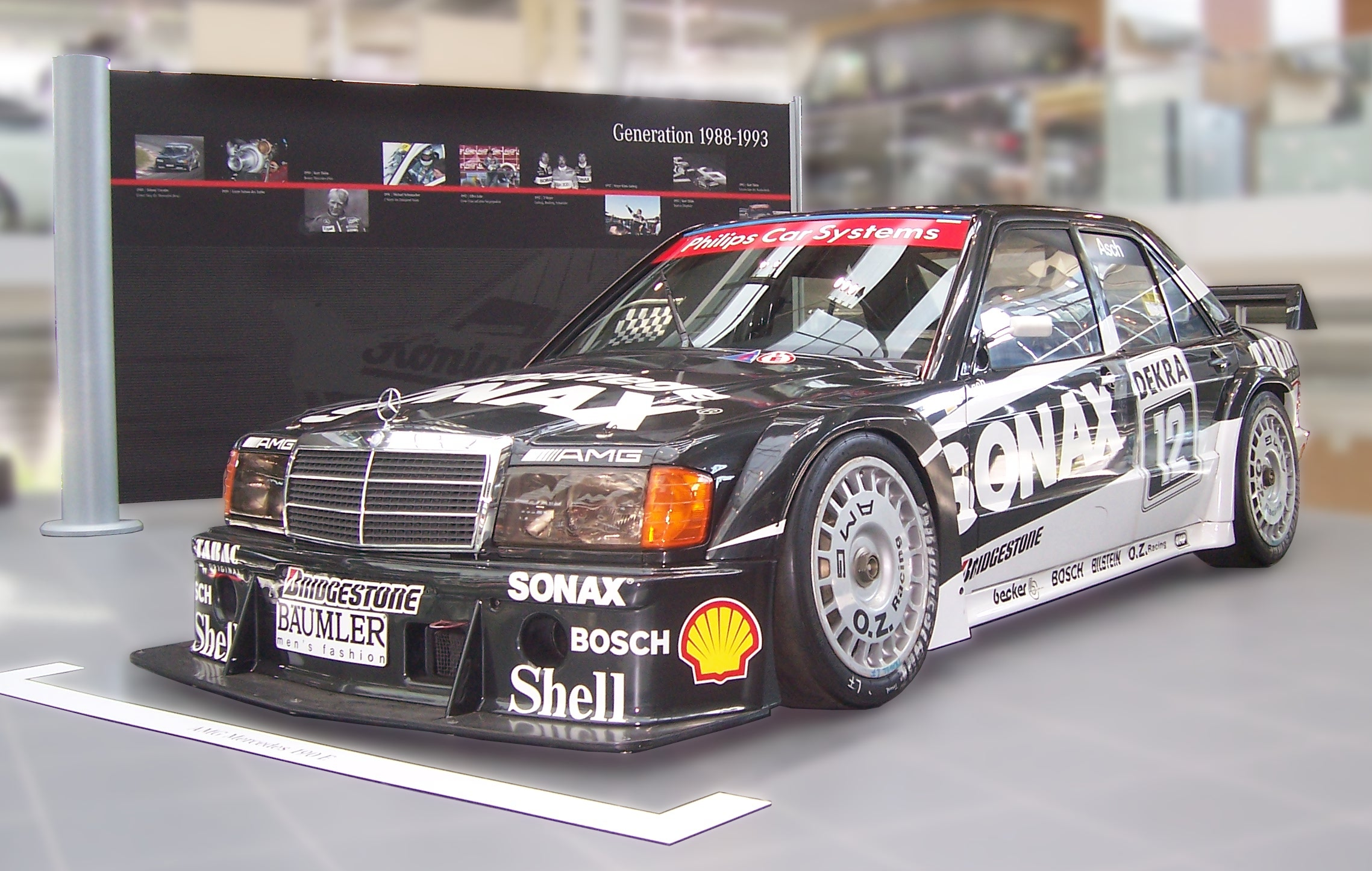
AMG 1993 DTM competition car

AMG was not part of Mercedes-Benz when the 190 was first produced, but a separate racing and tuning company. As AMG had racing experience in the DTM, they were tuning all the factory petrol engines for the customers and 190 E was one of them. Engine tuning added 25 hp (19 kW; 25 PS) over the standard car. Along with that aerodynamic features were added to the cars such as rear spoilers and front splitters in order to improve high speed stability, alloy wheels and a leather interior.

=== 190 E 3.2 AMG ===
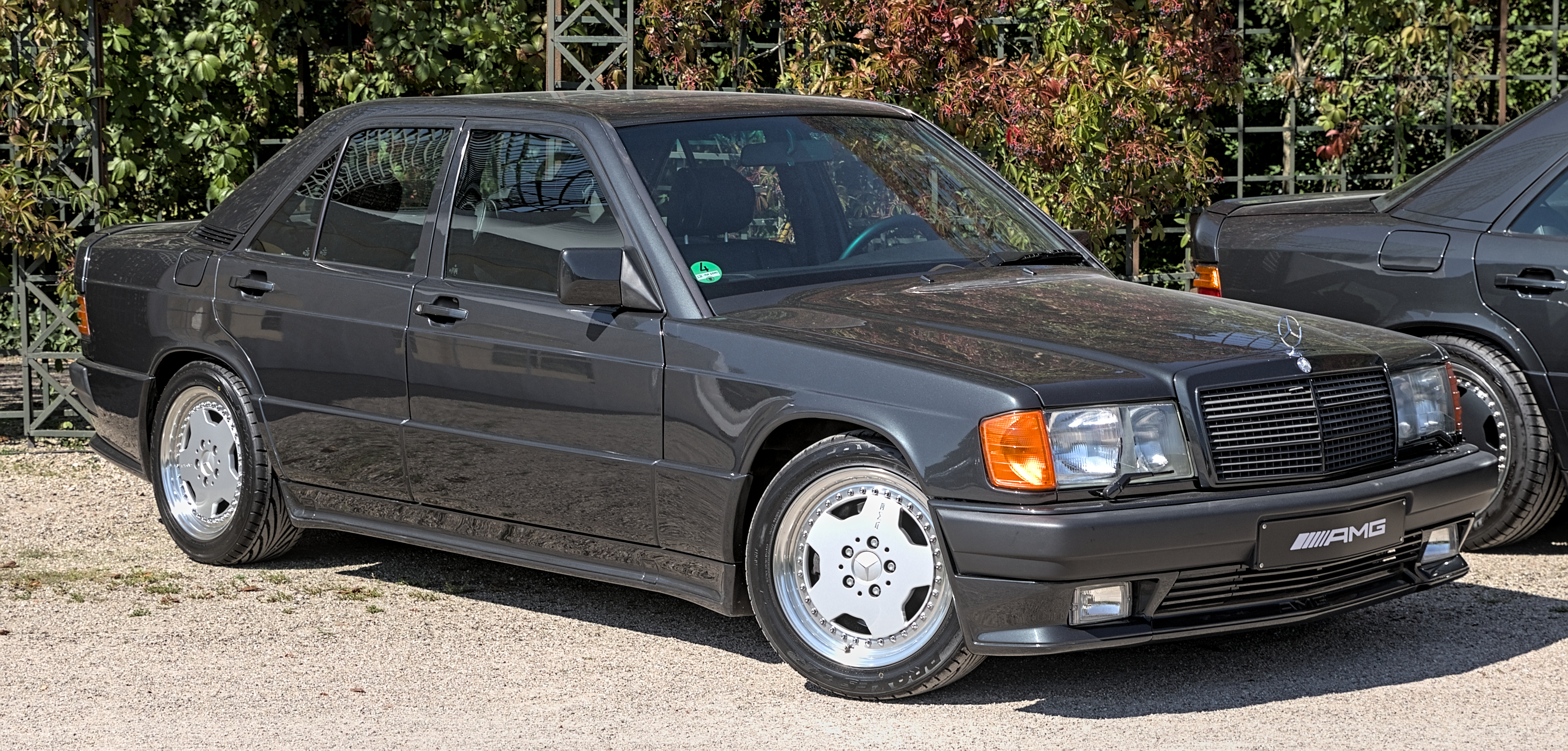
1992 Mercedes-Benz 190 E 3.2 AMG

The 190 E 3.2 AMG was the first model sold through AMG authorized re-seller with a Mercedes-Benz new car warranty. About 200 complete cars were made. They were offered in black or silver and were very expensive (about DM 155,780). Besides 200 complete 190 E 3.2 AMG's, Mercedes-Benz sold AMG body kits and 3.2 L AMG engines separately, so there are 190's fitted with those features at the factory or retrofitted. The 190 E 3.2 AMG straight-six 12-valve engines are derived from the 2.6-litre M103 engine and generate a maximum power output of 231 hp (172 kW; 234 PS), enabling the car to attain a top speed of 243 km/h (151 mph).

== Mercedes 190 D BlueEFFICIENCY (2009) ==
The 190 D BlueEFFICIENCY is an experimental vehicle demonstrating the improvements made in Diesel engine technology over the last 20 years, in isolation from the equally profound changes in the safety and comfort of the car as a whole. It was based on a 1988 190 E 2.6 which was fitted with a Mercedes-Benz OM651 engine, rated at 204 PS (150 kW; 201 hp) and 500 N⋅m (369 lb⋅ft) at 1,600–1,800 rpm. The 190 D Blue EFFICIENCY accelerates from 0 to 100 km/h in 6.2 seconds, with fuel efficiency of 4.9 litres per 100 kilometres (NEDC). By comparison, the original car has the fuel efficiency of 7.3 litres per 100 kilometres. The 190 D BlueEFFICIENCY was also compared to C 250 CDI BlueEFFICIENCY, which has fuel efficiency of 5.1 litres per 100 kilometres via NEDC method, despite the modern C 250 CDI BlueEFFICIENCY being 385 kg heavier, 16 cm longer, and around 9 cm wider and higher than a 190.

== Mercedes-Benz 190 E Elektro (1990) ==
The 190 E Elektro was a limited series of fully electric variants of the Mercedes-Benz W201. Back in May 1990, Mercedes revealed a fully electric 190 E at the Hannover Fair. This wasn't a typical concept for Mercedes as the carmaker wanted to use the 190E platform for testing different drive configurations and battery packs. These included mainly sodium-nickel chloride or sodium-sulphur batteries, which offered a much higher energy density than the era's more classic lead packs. At the 1991 Geneva Motor Show they even brought a more advanced version of the 190E ‘Electro’, showcasing their commitment to the project. The electric 190E retained the cabin space of the regular ICE model unaffected, as well as all its safety features. The Geneva show car featured two DC permanent magnet motors, one for each rear wheel, with a combined peak power output of 44 HP. As for the driving range, the electric 190 E offered 110 km (68 miles) on a full charge. The Mercedes 190 E Electro used a sodium-nickel chloride battery and a regenerative braking system to help charge the pack during driving. Mercedes also took out many of the weight-intensive mechanical components in order to offset the weight penalty of the heavy batteries; the result was an electric car that weighed just 200 kg (440 lbs) more than the model it's based on. As for the driving range, Mercedes even participated in a large-scale field trial on the German island of Rügen between 1992 and 1996, with the support of the local government. They wanted to test electric cars and their powertrains in everyday conditions and Mercedes sent 10 hand-built 190 E Electro cars which featured various electric motors and battery configurations. Some of them had no transmission at all while others even featured a manual transmission in combination with their electric powertrains. Special recharging stations with solar collectors were also installed on the island to test the concept of EVs in a consistent CO_{2}-neutral manner. Overall a total of 60 cars and vans from different brands were involved in the EV trial. The cars were tested by different participants, including taxi drivers, who used them in their normal lives. According to Mercedes, there were hardly any problems, with the test cars showcasing excellent reliability. One of the vehicles even achieved a usage rate of 100,000 km in one year (62,000 miles).
