= 1984 Nürburgring Race of Champions =

Race details
- Date: 12 May 1984
- Official name: Nürburgring Champions "Mercedes-Benz Cup"
- Location: Nürburgring; Nürburg, Germany
- Course: Permanent racing facility
- Course length: 4.542 km (2.822 miles)
- Distance: 12 laps, 54.504 km (33.864 miles)
- Weather: Light rain
- Attendance: 120,000

Pole position
- Driver: (France) Alain Prost
- Time: 2:05.92

Fastest lap
- Driver: (South Africa) Jody Scheckter
- Time: 2:12.50 on lap 11

Podium
- First: (Brazil) Ayrton Senna
- Second: (Austria) Niki Lauda
- Third: (Argentina) Carlos Reutemann

The 1984 Nürburgring Race of Champions, also known as the 1984 Nürburgring Eröffnungsrennen (Opening Race), was an exhibition race organised by Mercedes-Benz and held at the Nürburgring GP-Strecke on 12 May 1984 to celebrate the opening of the circuit. It featured 20 of the world's top drivers including nine of the fourteen Formula One world champions still alive at the time and two future champions Alain Prost and Ayrton Senna, the most Formula One world champions of any major motor race in history. All drivers competed in identical examples of the new Mercedes-Benz 190 E 2.3-16 with minor race modifications.

The 12-lap race was won by Senna and is widely regarded as marking his ascension onto the world stage of motor racing, having beaten some of the world's greatest drivers in equal machinery. His victory is comparable to Rudolf Caracciola's triumph in the first car race at the Nürburgring (the 1927 Eifelrennen).

== Background ==
=== Circuit ===
Formula One had not raced at the Nürburgring since the 1976 German Grand Prix, a race in which Niki Lauda had been seriously injured after protesting the safety of the Nordschleife, and particularly the slow responses of marshals that such a long circuit made inevitable. In an effort to entice F1 back to the venue (the German Grand Prix had moved to the Hockenheimring), a new, shorter layout was proposed to meet the tougher safety requirements that had since been developed. The GP-Strecke broke ground on 30 November 1981 and was constructed in place of the old start-and-finish straight and Südschleife over two years. The circuit was chosen to host the 1984 European Grand Prix in October; the concept of a "Race of Champions" was devised to showcase the venue and drum up interest for the return of F1.

=== Cars ===
Mercedes-Benz were due to launch a new 190 E 2.3-16, a departure from their more reserved line-up featuring a sporty, aerodynamic appearance and redeveloped 2.3-litre, 16-valve engine over the existing Mercedes 190. The event provided a good opportunity to market this new sports model, so 20 examples were set aside for it. Half the cars were painted in Rauchsilber (smoke silver) and half in Blauschwarzmetallic (blue-black metallic). Engineer Gerhard Lepler ensured the vehicles' suitability for racing with some minor safety and performance modifications:

- Gearing shortened (final drive 4.08).
- Silencers removed.
- Stiffer springs and shock absorbers; ride height lowered by 15 mm.
- Wheel offset increased from ET 25 to ET 44 for a 2 cm wider track.
- Four-piston front brake calipers.
- Tyres upgraded from Pirelli P6 205 55 VR 15 to P7.
- Steering wheel diameter decreased from 400 mm to 380 mm.
- Roll cage, fire extinguisher, central circuit breaker and quick-release bonnet pins.
- Electronically adjustable driver's seat.

=== Competitors ===
Gerd Kremer, head of product placement in motorsport at Mercedes-Benz, was tasked with inviting former F1 world champions and Nürburgring race winners. Helping his cause was Mercedes' long tradition offering heavily discounted road cars to F1 drivers: many saw participation as a way of repaying the brand for their support. Only five of the living world champions did not compete. Juan Manuel Fangio, then aged 72, did not race but was present in his capacities as a Mercedes-Benz ambassador. Emerson Fittipaldi and Mario Andretti were taking part in Pole Day for the Indy 500. Jackie Stewart upheld his vow never to race again following the death of his friend and teammate François Cevert. Reigning champion Nelson Piquet declined to enter.

The grid featured contemporary Grand Prix winners Elio de Angelis, Jacques Laffite and Alain Prost, recently-retired F1 drivers Carlos Reutemann and John Watson, former Mercedes-Benz F1 drivers Hans Herrmann and Stirling Moss, and Nürburgring 1000 km winners Klaus Ludwig, Manfred Schurti and Udo Schütz. Having successfully convinced nine world champions to take part, Kremer had leverage to secure an invitation for a young Ayrton Senna, whom he'd met at an F3 race the previous year and established what would be a long, close friendship. Senna was relatively unknown at the time, with only four Grand Prix entries, the British Formula Three Championship title and a Macau Grand Prix victory to his name.

=== Drivers ===
No.	Car-Engine	Colour	Driver
1	Mercedes-Benz 190 E 2.3-16	Smoke Silver	(United Kingdom) Stirling Moss
2	Mercedes-Benz 190 E 2.3-16	Blue-Black Metallic	(Australia) Jack Brabham
3	Mercedes-Benz 190 E 2.3-16	Smoke Silver	(Finland) Keke Rosberg
4	Mercedes-Benz 190 E 2.3-16	Blue-Black Metallic	(Argentina) Carlos Reutemann
5	Mercedes-Benz 190 E 2.3-16	Smoke Silver	(France) Alain Prost
6	Mercedes-Benz 190 E 2.3-16	Blue-Black Metallic	(Liechtenstein) Manfred Schurti
7	Mercedes-Benz 190 E 2.3-16	Smoke Silver	(France) Jacques Laffite
8	Mercedes-Benz 190 E 2.3-16	Blue-Black Metallic	(West Germany) Hans Herrmann
9	Mercedes-Benz 190 E 2.3-16	Smoke Silver	(United Kingdom) John Watson
10	Mercedes-Benz 190 E 2.3-16	Blue-Black Metallic	(Australia) Alan Jones
11	Mercedes-Benz 190 E 2.3-16	Smoke Silver	(Brazil) Ayrton Senna
12	Mercedes-Benz 190 E 2.3-16	Blue-Black Metallic	(West Germany) Klaus Ludwig
14	Mercedes-Benz 190 E 2.3-16	Smoke Silver	(United States) Phil Hill
15	Mercedes-Benz 190 E 2.3-16	Blue-Black Metallic	(United Kingdom) James Hunt
16	Mercedes-Benz 190 E 2.3-16	Smoke Silver	(New Zealand) Denny Hulme
17	Mercedes-Benz 190 E 2.3-16	Blue-Black Metallic	(United Kingdom) John Surtees
18	Mercedes-Benz 190 E 2.3-16	Smoke Silver	(Austria) Niki Lauda
19	Mercedes-Benz 190 E 2.3-16	Blue-Black Metallic	(South Africa) Jody Scheckter
20	Mercedes-Benz 190 E 2.3-16	Smoke Silver	(Italy) Elio de Angelis
21	Mercedes-Benz 190 E 2.3-16	Blue-Black Metallic	(West Germany) Udo Schütz

== Event report ==
=== Race ===
Pre-race events included demonstration runs in modern F1 cars by Manfred Winkelhock (driving Nelson Piquet's championship-winning Brabham-BMW BT52), Marc Surer and Johnny Cecotto. Winkelhock, who had suffered a frightening accident in which his car took off at the Flugplatz during the 1980 Eifelrennen, spoke positively of the safety improvements to the circuit. Cars and motorcycles which had previously raced at the Nordschleife were paraded around the new GP-Strecke; the parade featured former Mercedes-Benz F1 drivers Juan Manuel Fangio and Karl Kling. Before the race got underway, there was a TV segment in which most of the drivers introduced themselves to the camera, complimenting the new circuit and talking about their own success at the Nürburgring. Many of them appeared light-hearted.

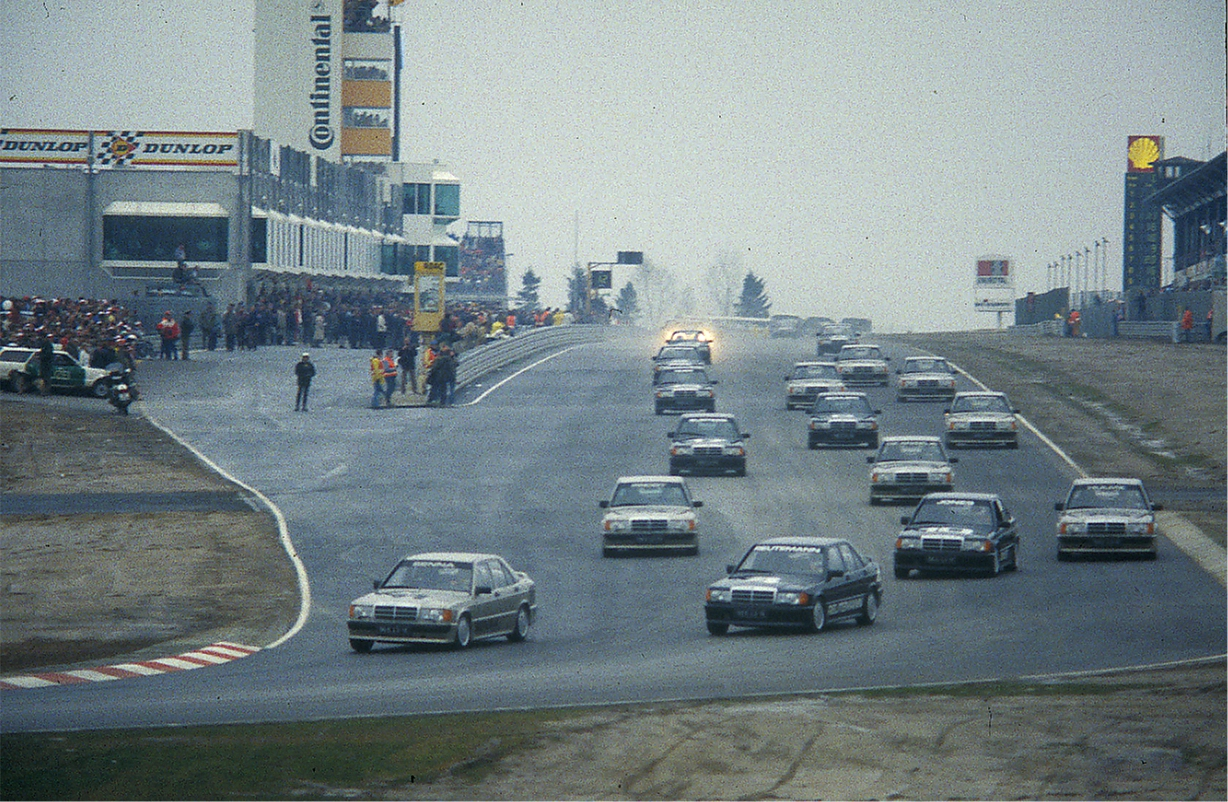
The exhibition race was won by Ayrton Senna, seen here leading into the first corner.

The official broadcast did not catch the start of the race due to an overrunning speech from Rhineland-Palatinate Minister-President Dr. Bernhard Vogel. Polesitter Alain Prost has stated that Ayrton Senna forced him off the track on the first lap, taking a lead he would not relinquish. Meanwhile, Prost had a run-in with Elio de Angelis, causing de Angelis to lose two laps in the pits repairing his car and relegating Prost to fifteenth by the end of the race. Alan Jones retired after three laps with mechanical issues. Niki Lauda missed out on practice time due to TV commitments (as stated during the official broadcast) and could only qualify 14th, but managed to recover to 2nd by the end of the race. Keke Rosberg and John Watson engaged in a late-race battle for fourth place.

=== Aftermath and legacy ===
The winning car was sent to the Mercedes-Benz Museum and has remained there since. Lauda's car was sold in race specification and is currently owned by a Swiss collector. The remaining vehicles were reverted to factory specifications and sold as road cars; only Senna's and Lauda's cars have been proven to be in their original race specification today. Senna was awarded a brand new example in Blauschwarzmetallic as a prize for winning the race.

The drivers were impressed by Senna's performance. Surtees reportedly urged his former boss Enzo Ferrari, with whom he'd enjoyed a close friendship during his time as a Ferrari driver, to hire him; Watson, who had followed him closely throughout the race, praised his attacking nature and commitment, especially through the chicane. Modern accounts present the race as Senna's first demonstration that he could take on, and beat, drivers at any level. However, not every competitor approached the event with the same commitment, and other drivers' performances in the race are often overlooked. To these articles' defence, the official broadcast's heavy focus on the lead pack made it difficult to follow any other developments; this was possibly done to avoid showing less-serious drivers cutting corners in the infield section. Regardless, sources agree that Senna was highly focused throughout the weekend, was determined to prove his worth as a top-level racing driver, and that he left a lasting impression on his competitors.

Senna backed up this performance with a drive to second place in torrential rain in the Monaco Grand Prix three weeks later, another race seen as marking his arrival on the world stage. He raced again at the GP-Strecke on 15 July in his only sportscar race, the 1984 Nürburgring 1000 km. However, F1's return to the Nürburgring that October for the European Grand Prix did not go so well for him: he got a good launch but caused a crash in the first corner. Prost won the race and Lauda put in another strong recovery drive. The 190 E went on to achieve great success in the DTM, with a race-winning span from 1986 to 1993 that included the 1991 and 1992 constructors' titles for Mercedes-Benz and the 1992 drivers' title for Klaus Ludwig.

== Results ==
=== Qualifying ===
Pos.	No.	Colour	Driver	Time
1	5	Smoke Silver	(France) Alain Prost	2:05.92
2	4	Blue-Black Metallic	(Argentina) Carlos Reutemann	2:06.12
3	11	Smoke Silver	(Brazil) Ayrton Senna	2:06.45
4	16	Smoke Silver	(New Zealand) Denny Hulme	2:06.61
5	10	Blue-Black Metallic	(Australia) Alan Jones	2:06.72
6	9	Smoke Silver	(United Kingdom) John Watson	2:06.98
7	20	Smoke Silver	(Italy) Elio de Angelis	2:07.16
8	6	Blue-Black Metallic	(Liechtenstein) Manfred Schurti	2:07.21
9	17	Blue-Black Metallic	(United Kingdom) John Surtees	2:07.32
10	14	Smoke Silver	(United States) Phil Hill	2:07.53
11	15	Blue-Black Metallic	(United Kingdom) James Hunt	2:07.60
12	1	Smoke Silver	(United Kingdom) Stirling Moss	2:08.07
13	2	Blue-Black Metallic	(Australia) Jack Brabham	2:08.43
14	18	Smoke Silver	(Austria) Niki Lauda	2:09.07
15	21	Blue-Black Metallic	(West Germany) Udo Schütz	2:09.94
16	8	Blue-Black Metallic	(West Germany) Hans Herrmann	2:10.50
17	3	Smoke Silver	(Finland) Keke Rosberg	2:12.87
18	19	Blue-Black Metallic	(South Africa) Jody Scheckter	2:13.63
19	7	Smoke Silver	(France) Jacques Laffite	No time
20	12	Blue-Black Metallic	(West Germany) Klaus Ludwig	No time

=== Race ===
Pos.	No.	Driver	Laps	Time/Retired	Grid
1	11	(Brazil) Ayrton Senna	12	26:57.78	3
2	18	(Austria) Niki Lauda	12	+1.38	14
3	4	(Argentina) Carlos Reutemann	12	+3.69	2
4	3	(Finland) Keke Rosberg	12	+4.20	17
5	9	(United Kingdom) John Watson	12	+4.47	6
6	16	(New Zealand) Denny Hulme	12	+6.35	4
7	19	(South Africa) Jody Scheckter	12	+7.12	18
8	2	(Australia) Jack Brabham	12	+13.47	13
9	12	(West Germany) Klaus Ludwig	12	+18.49	20
10	15	(United Kingdom) James Hunt	12	+19.68	11
11	17	(United Kingdom) John Surtees	12	+25.39	9
12	14	(United States) Phil Hill	12	+32.06	10
13	6	(Liechtenstein) Manfred Schurti	12	+37.00	8
14	1	(United Kingdom) Stirling Moss	12	+37.65	12
15	5	(France) Alain Prost	12	+39.34	1
16	21	(West Germany) Udo Schütz	12	+48.13	15
17	7	(France) Jacques Laffite	12	+51.11	19
18	8	(West Germany) Hans Herrmann	12	+1:37.10	16
19	20	(Italy) Elio de Angelis	10	+2 Laps	7
Ret	10	(Australia) Alan Jones	3		5
