= Deutsche Messe AG =

- Company type: Limited company (Aktiengesellschaft)
- ISIN: NA
- Industry: Trade fairs
- Founded: 16 August 1947
- Headquarters: Hanover
- Key people: Dr Jochen Köckler, CEO
- Revenue: 346.2 million € (2019); 98.7 million € (2020)
- Number of employees: 894 (2008); 738 (2020)
- Website: www.messe.de

Deutsche Messe AG (German: German Trade Fair Limited) is the operating company for the Hanover Fairground, based in the city of Hanover, Germany. It is the largest trade fair operator in Germany and was founded in 1947. One of the main trade fairs held is Hannover Messe.
