= Hannover Messe =

Trade fair

Coordinates: 52.3269°N 9.8092°E

Poster for the 1947 fair

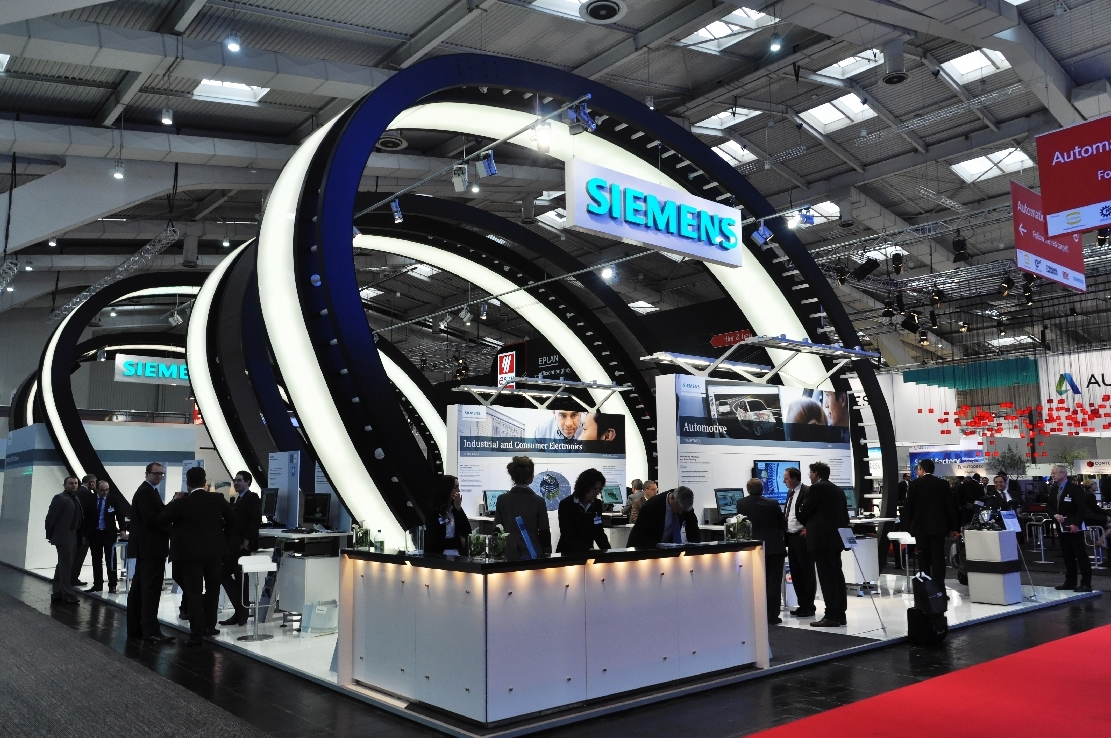
Siemens at the 2014 exhibition

The Hannover Messe (HM; "Hanover Fair") is one of the world's largest trade fairs, dedicated to the topic of industry development. It is organized by Deutsche Messe AG and held on the Hanover Fairground in Hanover, Germany. The fair attracts typically 100,000–200,000 visitors per year.

== History ==
The Hannover Messe started in 1947 in an undamaged factory building in Laatzen, south of Hanover, by an arrangement of the British military government in order to boost the economic advancement of post-war Germany. The first fair was colloquially known as Fischbrötchenmesse (Fischbrötchen fair, tr. fish sandwich) due to the exemptions in food rationing for the fair at this time. It proved hugely successful and was thence repeated on an annual basis, contributing largely to the success of the Hanover fairground in replacing the then-East German city of Leipzig as the new major fair city for West Germany.

The product portfolio includes building automation and technology, coating materials, air compressors, gas compressors, environmental technology, factory equipment, compressed air technology, micro-actuator systems, motors, scheduling software, refrigeration technology, robotics, and additive manufacturing systems.

In the 1980s, the growing information and telecommunication industry demanded the organizer Deutsche Messe AG to split the fair. CeBIT was a successful spin-off of the Hannover Messe. The Hanover Fair now covers all areas of industrial technology.

Year	Exhibitors	Visitors	Partner Country
2014		175,000	Netherlands
2015	6,500	220,000	India
2016		190,000	United States
2017		225,000	Poland
2018	5,800	210,000	Mexico
2019	6,500	215,000	Sweden
2020			Cancelled (COVID-19)
2021	1,800	95,000 (Digital)	Indonesia*
2022	2,500	75,000	Portugal
2023	4,000	130,000	Indonesia
2024	4,000	130,000	Norway
2025			Canada
2026			Brazil

== Hermes Award ==
The "Hermes Award" has been presented as a technology innovation prize at the Hanover Fair since 2004. It is considered to be the most prestigious award in industrial R&D. The prize promotes the innovative ideas in the market-ready products and services for industry. The patrons of the award are the German Federal Ministry of Education and Research and the German State of Lower Saxony. Renowned German Professor Wolfgang Wahlster was one of the initiators of the award and for many years was the Chairman of the Hermes Award Jury.

The Hermes Creative Award is available to any individual people, small or large business, or nonprofit organization from any country worldwide. The competition acknowledges and rewards creative works in different categories, including print, marketing, public relations, digital media, advertising, and products and services.

== Partner countries ==
Hannover Messe has changed over the years, from a local trade fair into a global event. In the 2000s, a partner country model was introduced, so that a single country is the leading one during the certain year. At the official trade fair opening event, the partner country is responsible to present an extensive artistic performance connected to the country's history and culture. Apart for this, the partner country shows the selected, top innovations at the national stand and many other companies from this specific country attend as exhibitors.

- 2006 dates: 24–28 April (partner country: India)
- 2007 dates: 16–20 April (partner country: Turkey)
- 2008 dates: 21–25 April (partner country: Japan)
- 2009 dates: 20–24 April (partner country: Korea)
- 2010 dates: 19–23 April (partner country: Italy)
- 2011 dates: 4–8 April (partner country: France)
- 2012 dates: 23–27 April (partner country: China)
- 2013 dates: 8–12 April (partner country: Russia)
- 2014 dates: 7–11 April (partner country: Netherlands)
- 2015 dates: 13–17 April (partner country: India)
- 2016 dates: 25–29 April (partner country: United States)
- 2017 dates: 24–28 April (partner country: Poland)
- 2018 dates: 23–27 April (partner country: Mexico)
- 2019 dates: 1–5 April (partner country: Sweden)
- 2020 dates: 13–17 July (postponed from 20 to 24 April) digital edition due to COVID-19
- 2021 dates: 12–16 April (partner country: Indonesia) digital edition due to COVID-19
- 2022 dates: 30 May – 2 June (partner country: Portugal)
- 2023 dates: 17–21 April (partner country: Indonesia)
- 2025 dates: 31 March - 4 April (partner country: Canada)
- 2026 dates: 20–24 April (partner country: Brazil)
