= Junaio =

Former augmented reality browser

- Original author: Metaio GmbH
- Developer: Metaio GmbH
- Initial release: November 11, 2009
- Final release: 6.0 / November 5, 2014
- Operating system: Android, iOS
- Available in: English, German, Spanish, Russian, Japanese, Chinese, Italian, French
- Type: Augmented reality
- Website: www.junaio.com www.junaio.jp www.junaio.es

Junaio was an augmented reality browser designed for 3G and 4G mobile devices. It was developed by Munich-based company Metaio GmbH. It provided a Creator application and an API for developers and content providers to generate mobile Augmented Reality experiences for end-users. The smartphone app, for Android and iPhone platforms, and API were free to use.

Junaio was the first augmented reality browser which had overcome the accuracy limitations of GPS navigation through LLA Markers (latitude, longitude, altitude marker, patent pending).

In May 2015 Metaio and all of the company's products were acquired by Apple. Subsequent to the purchase Junaio web presences were removed, and a planned Metaio conference was cancelled. Junaio and all Junaio channels were deactivated on 15 December 2015.

== Overview of the technical infrastructure ==
Within the Junaio app all deployed contents was organized in so-called channels. A channel could be created using the API (REST API) or 3rd party tools like ConnectAR, BuildAR, Metaio Creator, etc. The channels would then be uploaded to the server infrastructure behind the Junaio app, called Metaio Cloud.

Users could open/load the available channels inside the Junaio app to get access to the according AR contents and scenarios.

The API was based on "AREL" (Augmented Reality Experience Language) which allows scripting of these channels based on common web technologies such as HTML5, XML and JavaScript.

== Uses ==
In 2011, during the Occupy Wall Street protests, organizers encouraged the development and use of augmented reality features within the junaio application to supplement physical protests and overcome physical restrictions placed on them.

== See also ==
- LLA Marker
- Augmented reality
