= TW 400 =

Tram vehicle formerly used in Hanover, Germany

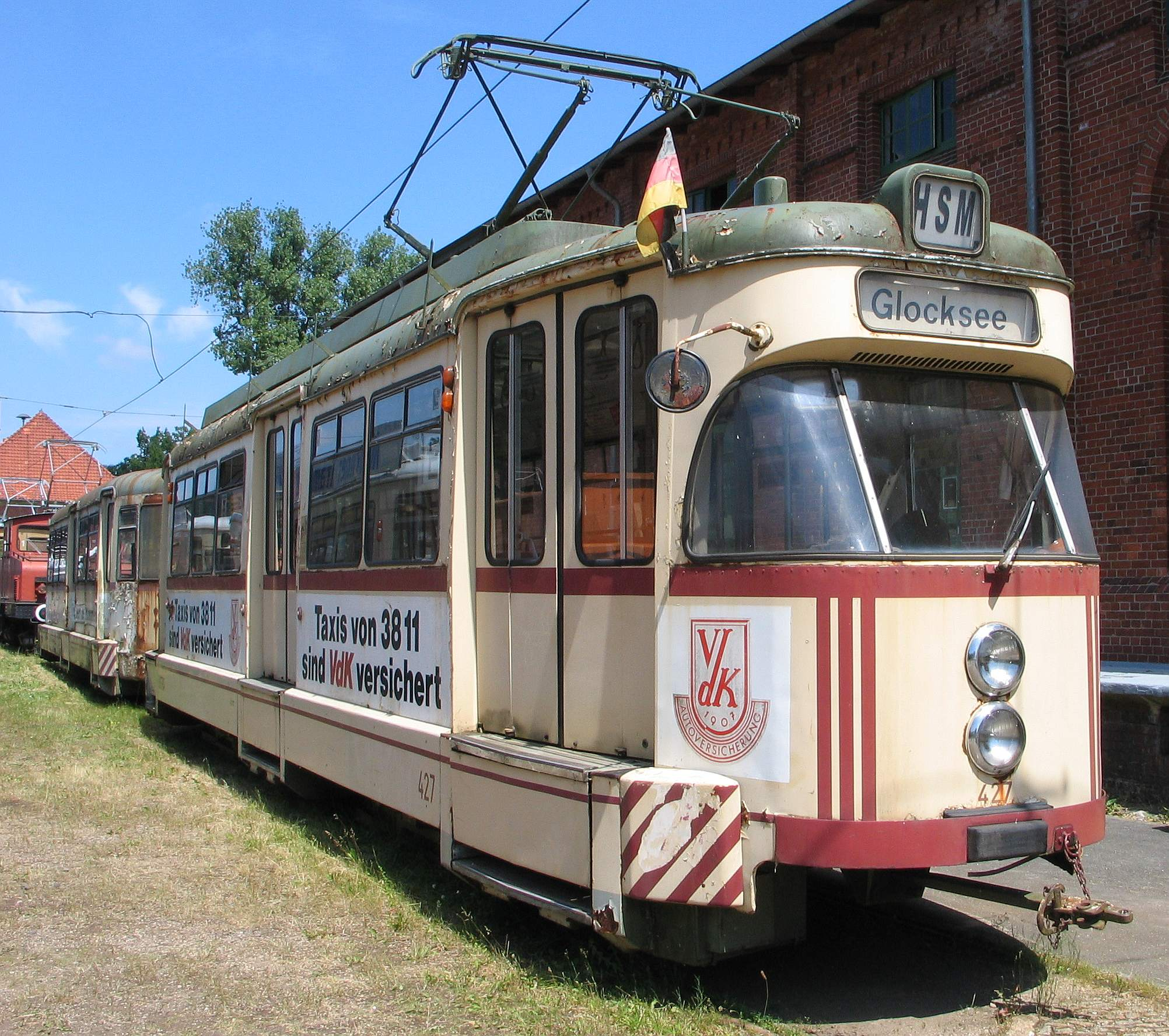
TW 400 at the HSM

The TW 400 is a type of tram vehicle formerly used on the tramways of Hanover, Germany, built from 1956 to 1958 by Duewag. Some units underwent remodeling to prepare them for being used on the Hanover Stadtbahn network but they were never used for this purpose.

During the construction of the A tunnel of the Hanover Stadtbahn it was not foreseeable whether the new TW 6000 cars would be available in sufficient numbers. Therefore, a number of TW 400 cars (called Breitraumwagen because of their body width of 2.35 metres or 7 feet 9 inches), was brought up to tunnel standards from 1969 onwards.

This involved:

- Folding steps
- Rearrangement of the doors
- wide door steps (dubbed "Blumenbretter" or "window sills"), bridging the gap between the tramcar and the platform.

Since the tram cars were unidirectional vehicles, all stations on the A line have their platforms on the right in direction of travel. This led to some problems, most notably the complicated layout of the station Lister Platz, with platforms stacked on top of each other. The Lahe terminus also was equipped with a turning loop to allow the TW 400 cars to turn around.

In the end, when the Stadtbahn system opened in 1975, there was a large enough number of TW 6000 available and so the TW 400 were never used in the tunnels. They used to run on the tramway lines and were put out of service in the late 1970s and early 1980s. Most of them were consequently scrapped. The tunnel-enabled unit 427, together with trailer 1424, has been preserved at the HSM in Sehnde.

== See also ==
- üstra
- Hanover Stadtbahn
