= Jasper Morrison =

British designer

Jasper Morrison CBE RDI
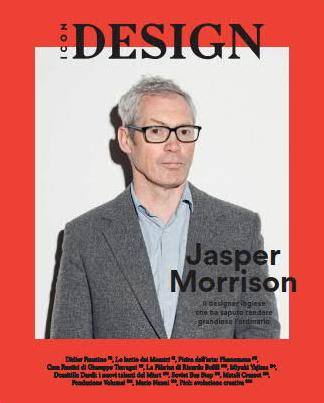
- Mondadori Icon Design magazine cover, February 2016
- Born: 1959 (age 66–67); London, England
- Education: Bryanston School
- Alma mater: Ravensbourne, Foundation course (1979); Kingston Polytechnic, Bachelor of Design (1982); Royal College of Art, Master of Design (1985); Berlin University of the Arts
- Occupation: Industrial designer
- Known for: Chair design; founder of Jasper Morrison Ltd; co-originator of the Super Normal design manifesto
- Honours: Commander of the British Empire; Royal Designer for Industry
- Website: jaspermorrison.com

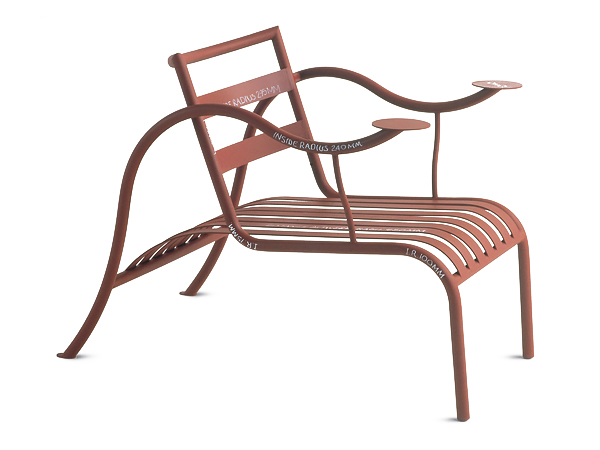
Thinking Man's Chair first exhibited at Aram Gallery and later manufactured by Cappellini (1985–1988)

Jasper Morrison (born 1959) is an English product and furniture designer. He is known for the refinement and apparent simplicity of his designs. In a rare interview with the designer, he is quoted as saying "objects should never shout."

== Early life and education ==
Morrison was born in London, England, and was educated at Bryanston School in Dorset. His design studies began with a foundation course at Ravensbourne College of Art (1978–79), after which he studied at Kingston Polytechnic, graduating in 1982 with a Bachelor of Design degree. He then attended the Royal College of Art, from which he received a master's degree in Design in 1985. He also studied at the Berlin University of the Arts (formerly the German: Hochschule für Bildende Künste).

He has spoken about his childhood memories of the Braun SK 4 "Snow White's Coffin" radiogram (designed by Hans Gugelot and Dieter Rams in 1956), which he first saw in the "Scandinavian style study" of his grandfather's house, and how "the room and the record player both had a very important influence on [his] choice in becoming a designer."

== Work and career ==
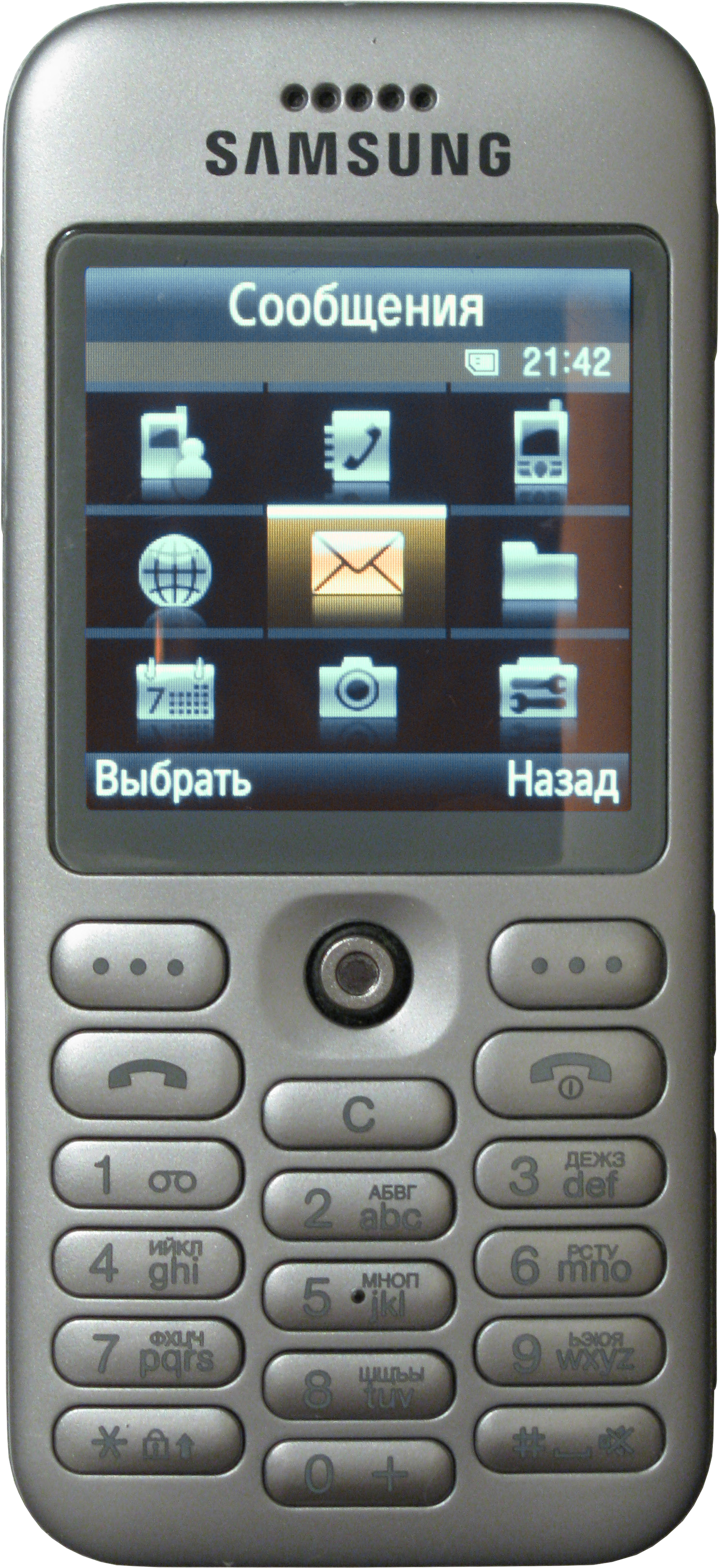
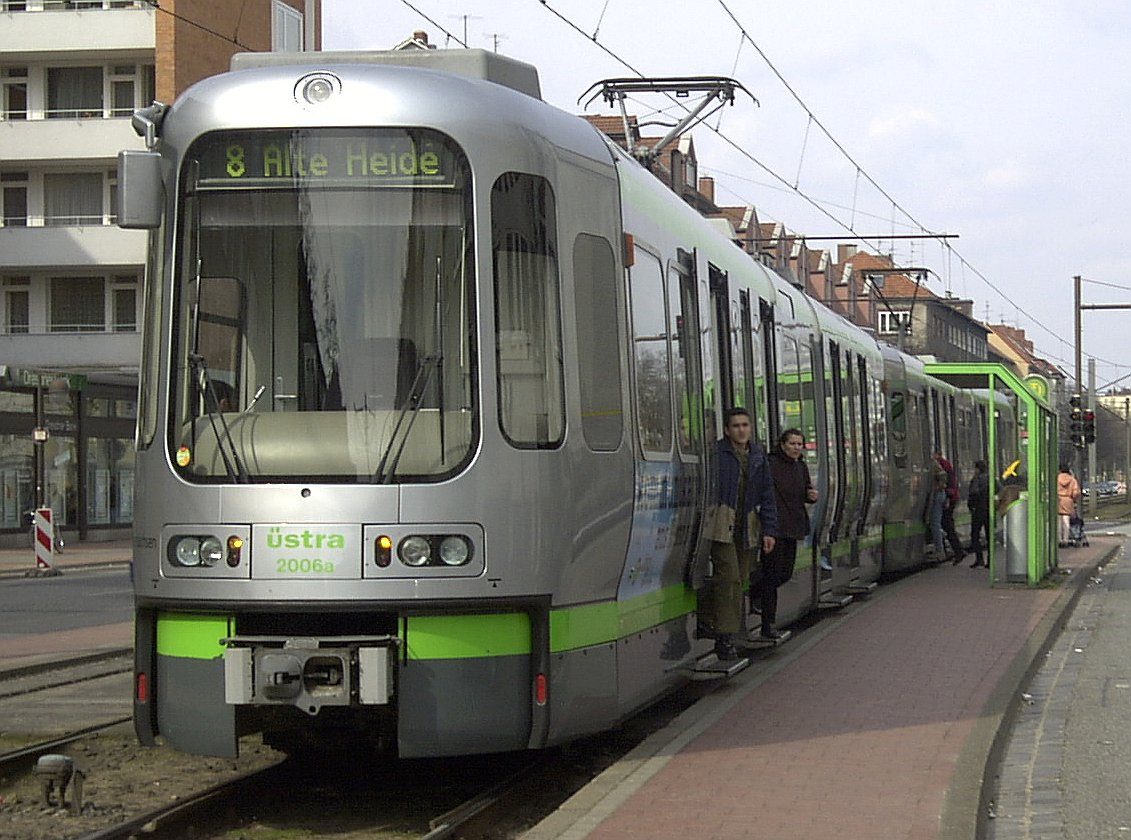
Samsung SGH-E590 telephone (2007) and Morrison's TW 2000 light rail vehicle, Hanover (with Herbert Lindinger, 1990s)

Morrison's work has been praised for "emphasizing the value of the essential and the importance of the ordinary." Writing for Domus magazine, the Milanese curator Maria Cristina Didero said that "Morrison has always had an aversion to design ego. His work does not shout, does not seek spectacle, does not aim to dazzle."

He has designed products and furniture for many manufacturers and brands such as Alessi, Alias, Cappellini, Emeco, Flos, FSB, Hermès, Ideal Standard, Magis, Issey Miyake, Olivetti, Puiforcat, Rosenthal, Samsung, Sony, SCP (the first company to manufacture one of Morrison's designs), Üstra, and Vitra. Morrison is the lead designer at boutique Swiss consumer technology company Punkt., known for its minimalist MP01 and MP02 mobile phones. He has also collaborated with the Japanese retail company MUJI on a variety of products ranging from housewares to housing.

Morrison curated the Super Normal exhibition with Japanese designer Naoto Fukasawa in 2006, which presented 200 ordinary or anonymously designed products that were devoid of gimmicks and branding.

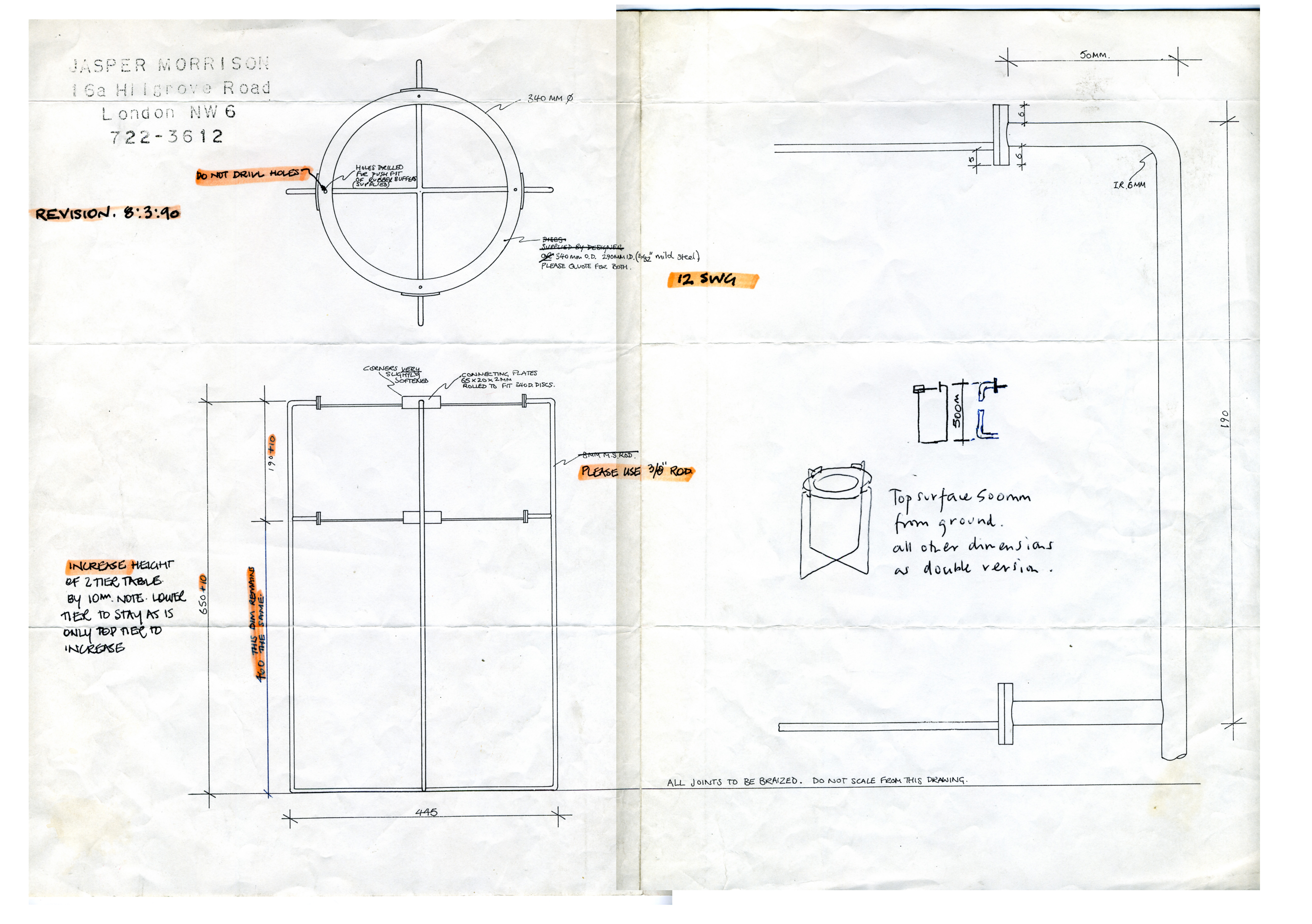
SCP side table drawing with annotations (1986)

In a Domus magazine review of his 2015 exhibition Thingness at Le Grand-Hornu, the design critic Alice Rawsthorn stated that Morrison "is one of the most influential product designers of our time." More recently, a 2020 article about the designer in la Repubblica described him as "the anti-Philippe Starck par excellence" whose "projects are often the result of a long gestation to achieve simplicity, elegance and discretion."

His work has been widely exhibited and is in the collection of the British Museum, Victoria and Albert Museum, and Design Museum in London, the Vitra Design Museum in Germany, the ADI Design Museum in Milan, the Museum of Modern Art (MoMA) in New York, as well as the M+ museum in Hong Kong and other institutions.

Morrison's designs have received many awards including the Compasso d'Oro, Good Design Award, and 12 iF Product Design Awards.

In March 2007, he was awarded an honorary doctorate in Design from Kingston University.

Morrison received the Isamu Noguchi Award in 2015, and in 2020 he was named both "Designer of the Year" by the Elle Decoration British Design Awards, as well as the German Design Award "Personality of the Year". In the same year, he also received the Compasso d'Oro "Career Award" from the ADI in Milan.

Morrison was appointed Commander of the Order of the British Empire (CBE) in the UK 2020 Birthday Honours for services to design.

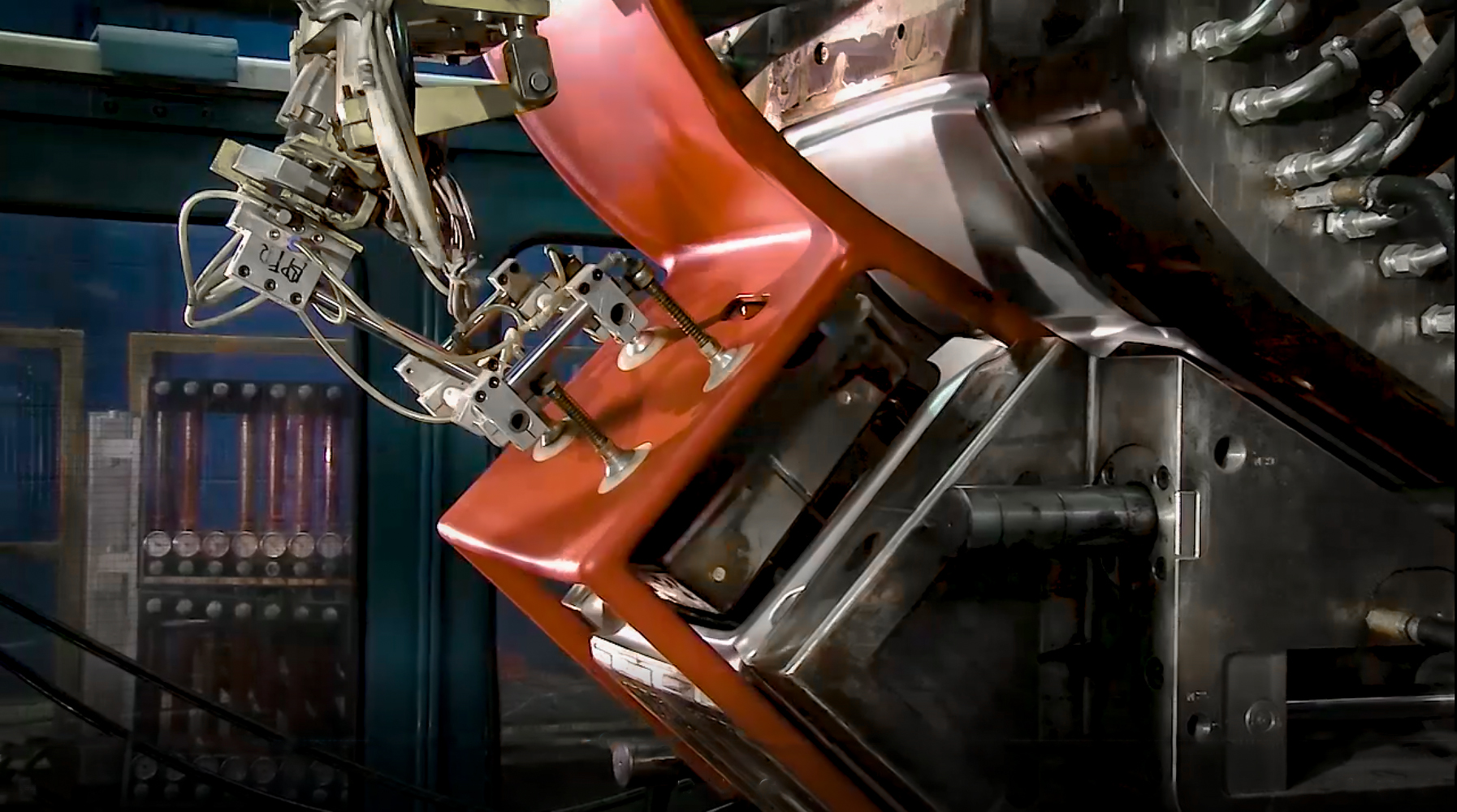
Air-Chair production process

In 2025, Morrison was among 35 UK-based designers who signed a letter to the technology secretary, Peter Kyle, urging the government to reconsider its plans to allow artificial intelligence companies to train their models on copyrighted works without permission.

Morrison oversaw the exhibition design for a retrospective of the work of Lella and Massimo Vignelli held at the Milan Triennale museum in 2026.

== Selected works ==
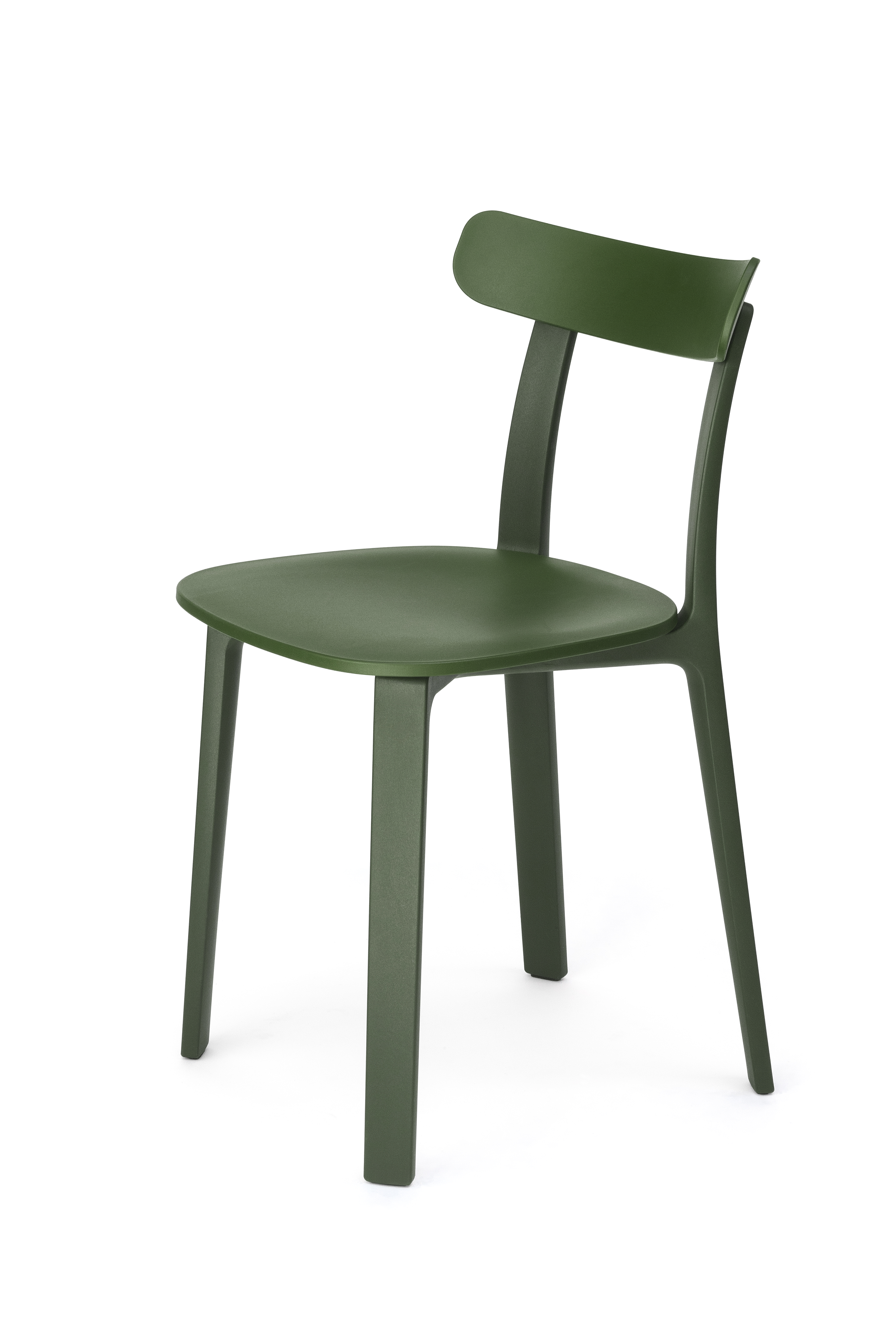
Vitra APC chair (2016)

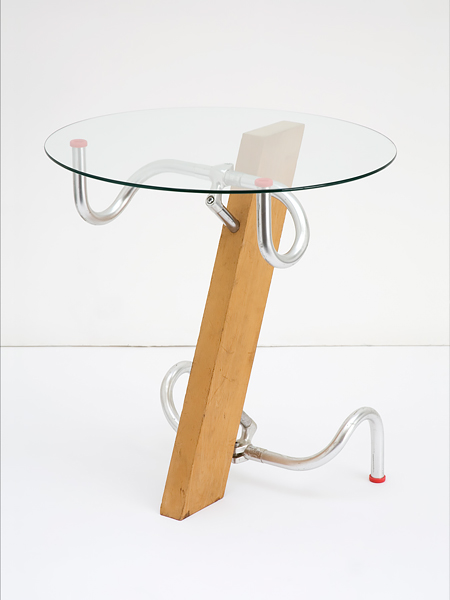
Handlebar table (1982)

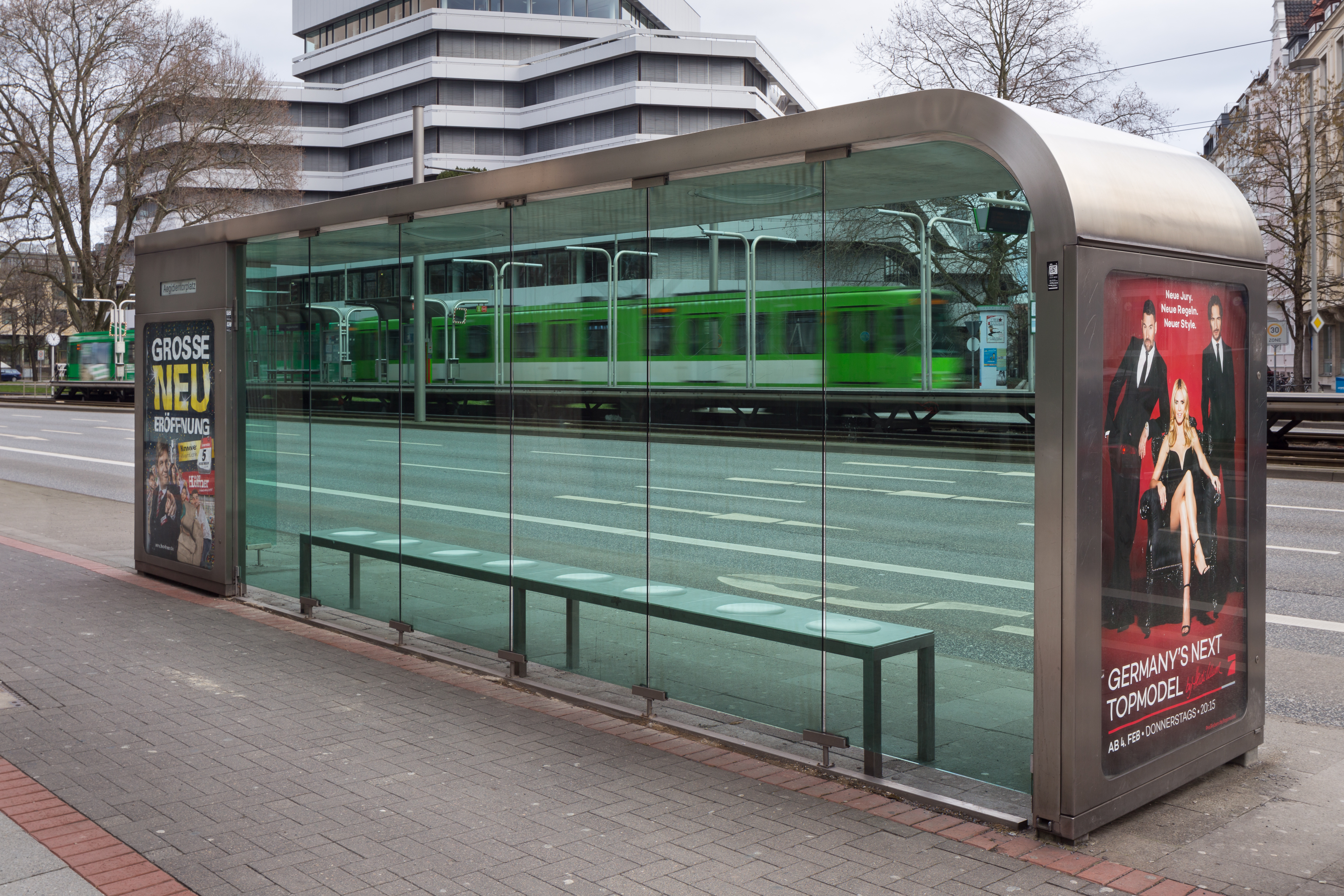
Bus stop for üstra, Hannover, Germany (1992)

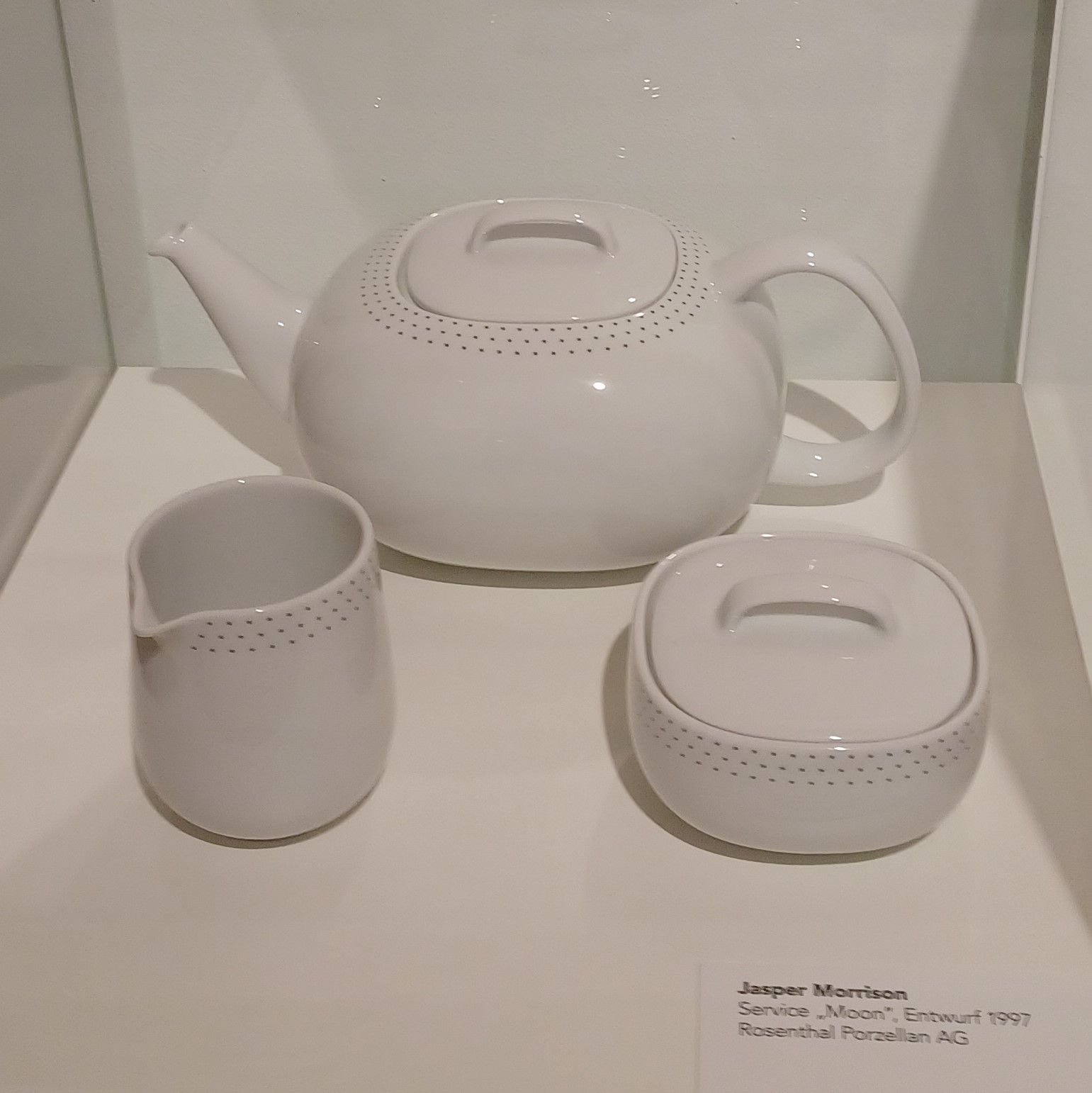
Rosenthal Moon porcelain (1997)

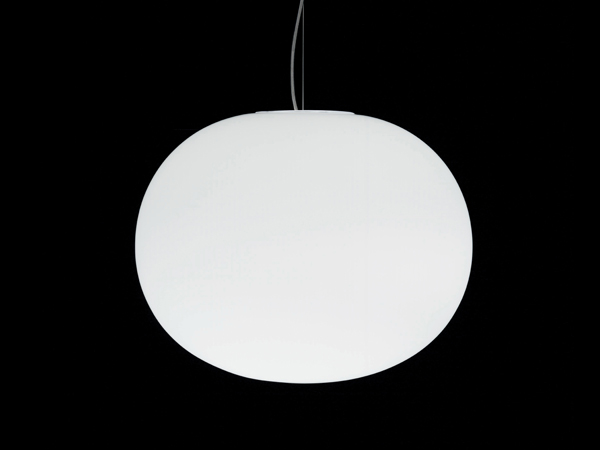
Flos Glo-ball pendant light (1998)

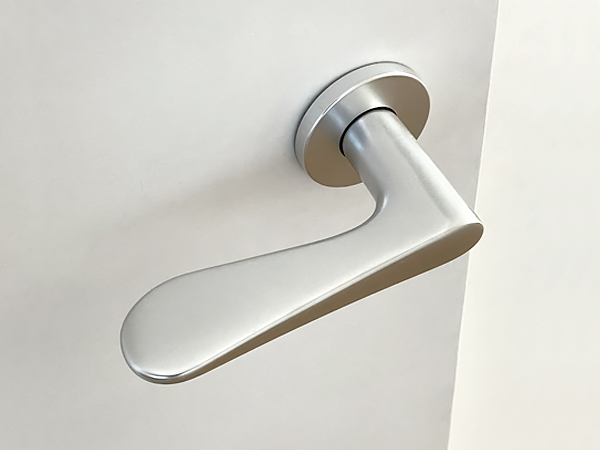
FSB Model 1144 door handle (1991)

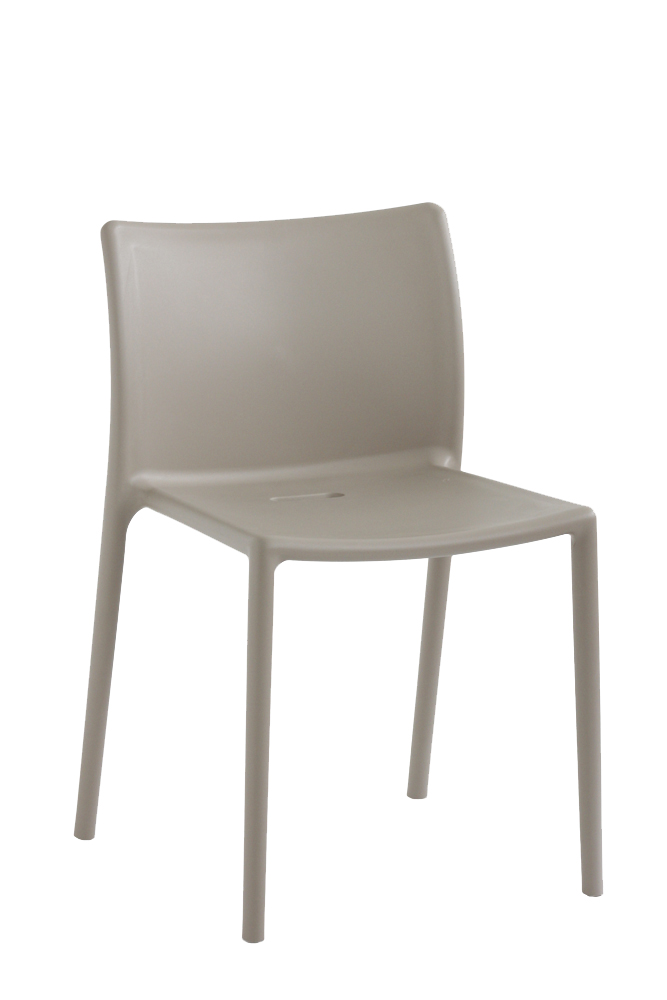
Magis Air-Chair (1999)

== Selected exhibitions ==
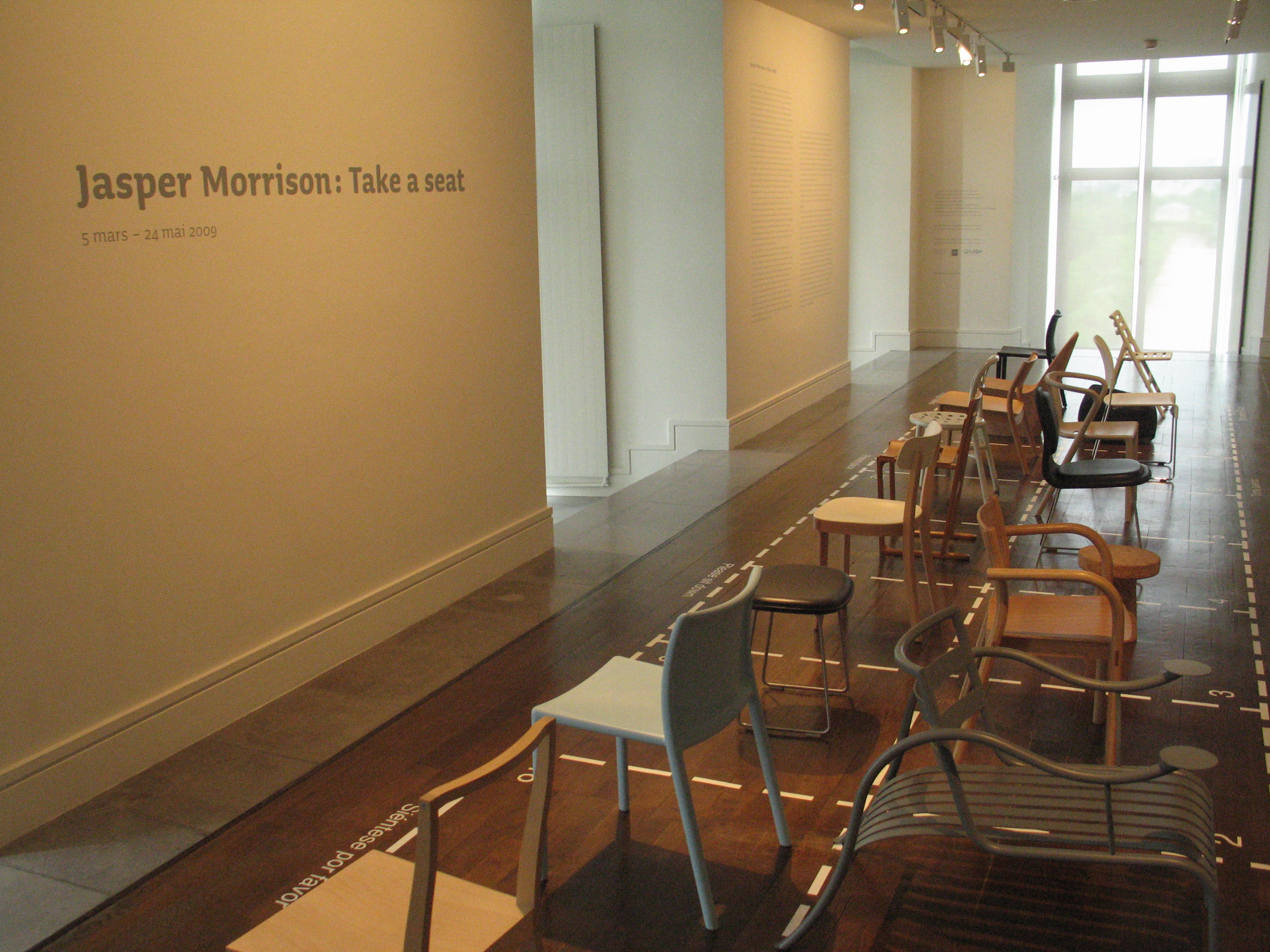
Jasper Morrison: Take a Seat exhibition, Musée des Arts Décoratifs, Paris (2009)

- 1988 Some New Items for the Home, DAAD Galerie, Berlin, Germany
- 1989 Some New Items for the Home (Part II, with Vitra), Galerie Facsimile, Milan, Italy
- 2006 Super Normal, (curated by Jasper Morrison and Naoto Fukasawa), Axis Gallery, Tokyo, Japan
- 2009 Jasper Morrison: Take a Seat, Musée des Arts Décoratifs, Paris, France
- 2011 Jasper Morrison: Danish Design: I Like It!, Danish Museum of Decorative Art, Copenhagen, Denmark
- 2015 Thingness, Grand-Hornu, Boussu, Belgium
- 2018 Objects & Atmosphere, Iittala & Arabia Design Centre, Helsinki
- 2019 Corks, exhibition of cork editions, Kasmin Gallery, New York
- 2022 Early Work, Jasper Morrison shop, London, England

== Publications ==
- Dormer, Peter (1990). Jasper Morrison: Designs, Projects and Drawings, 1981–1989. Architecture Design and Technology Press. ISBN 9781854544353. OCLC 901561363.
- Morrison, Jasper (1992). A World Without Words. Tony Arefin.
- Morrison, Jasper (1997). A Book of Spoons. Imschoot. ISBN 9789072191854. OCLC 41423606.
- Morrison, Jasper; Ganseforth, Heinrich (1997). A New Tram for Hannover - Design: Jasper Morrison. Gebr. Mann. ISBN 9783786122487. OCLC 75902074.
- Morrison, Jasper (1998). A World Without Words (2nd ed.). Lars Müller. ISBN 9783907044827. OCLC 456768503.
- Boyer, Charles-Arthur; Morrison, Jasper; Zanco, Federica (1999). Jasper Morrison. Dis voir. ISBN 9782906571730. OCLC 757671494.
- Morrison, Jasper (2002). Jasper Morrison: Everything but the Walls. Lars Müller. ISBN 9783907078440. OCLC 469426651.
- Morrison, Jasper; Mauderli, Laurence (2006). Jasper Morrison: Répertoire pour une forme: Carrara tables. B. Chauveau. ISBN 9782915837100. OCLC 470651351.
- Fukasawa, Naoto; Morrison, Jasper (2007). Super Normal: Sensations of the Ordinary. Lars Müller. ISBN 9783037781067. OCLC 804331139.
- Boysson, Bernadette de; Morrison, Jasper (2012). Jasper Morrison au musée. B. Chauveau. ISBN 9782915837582. OCLC 888838417.
- Morrison, Jasper (28 March 2013). James Irvine obituary. The Guardian. ISSN 0261-3077.
- Morrison, Jasper; Olivares, Jonathan; Verlardi, Marco (2014). Source Material: A Project by Jasper Morrison, Jonathan Olivares & Marco Velardi. Vitra Design Museum. ISBN 9783931936976. OCLC 967841666.
- Morrison, Jasper (2014). The Good Life: Perceptions of the Ordinary. Lars Müller. ISBN 9783037784235. OCLC 884953735.
- Picchi F, Morrison J, Cappellini G, Rossiello M, et al. (2015). James Irvine. London: Phaidon Press. ISBN 9780714868967.
- Morrison, Jasper (2015). A Book of Things. Lars Müller. ISBN 9783037784631. OCLC 1023259812.
- Morrison, Jasper (2017). The Hard Life. Lars Müller. ISBN 9783037785140. OCLC 992532936.
- Morrison, Jasper (2020). Notes on design: Enzo Mari by Jasper Morrison. Domus
- Morrison, Jasper; Saik, David; Tane, Tsuyoshi; Zanco, Federica (2023). Fehlbaum, Rolf (ed.). A Way of Life: Notes on Ballenberg. Lars Müller. ISBN 978-3037787267.
