= TW 3000 =

Articulated light rail vehicle

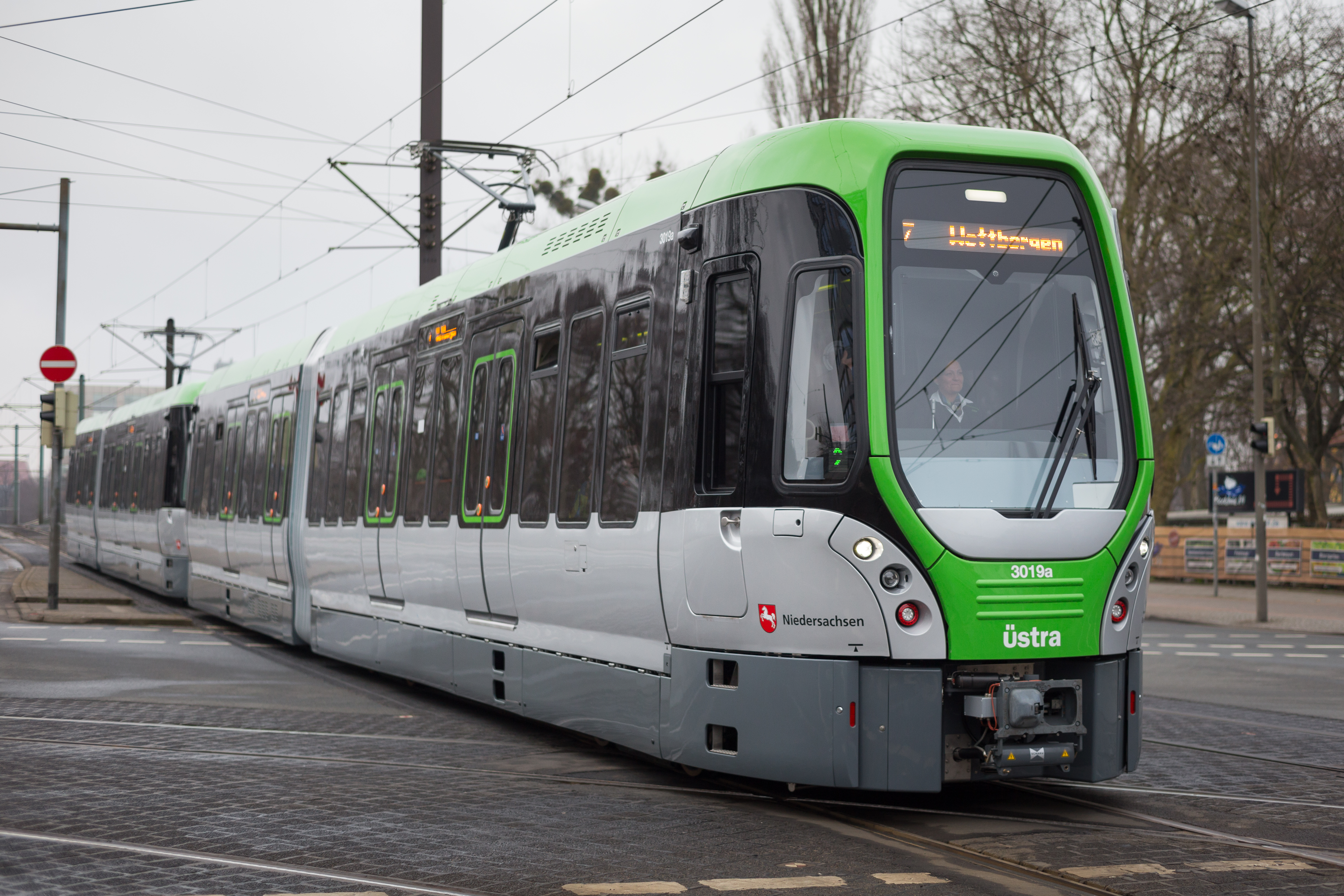
- TW 3000 on its first day of service on 15 March 2015

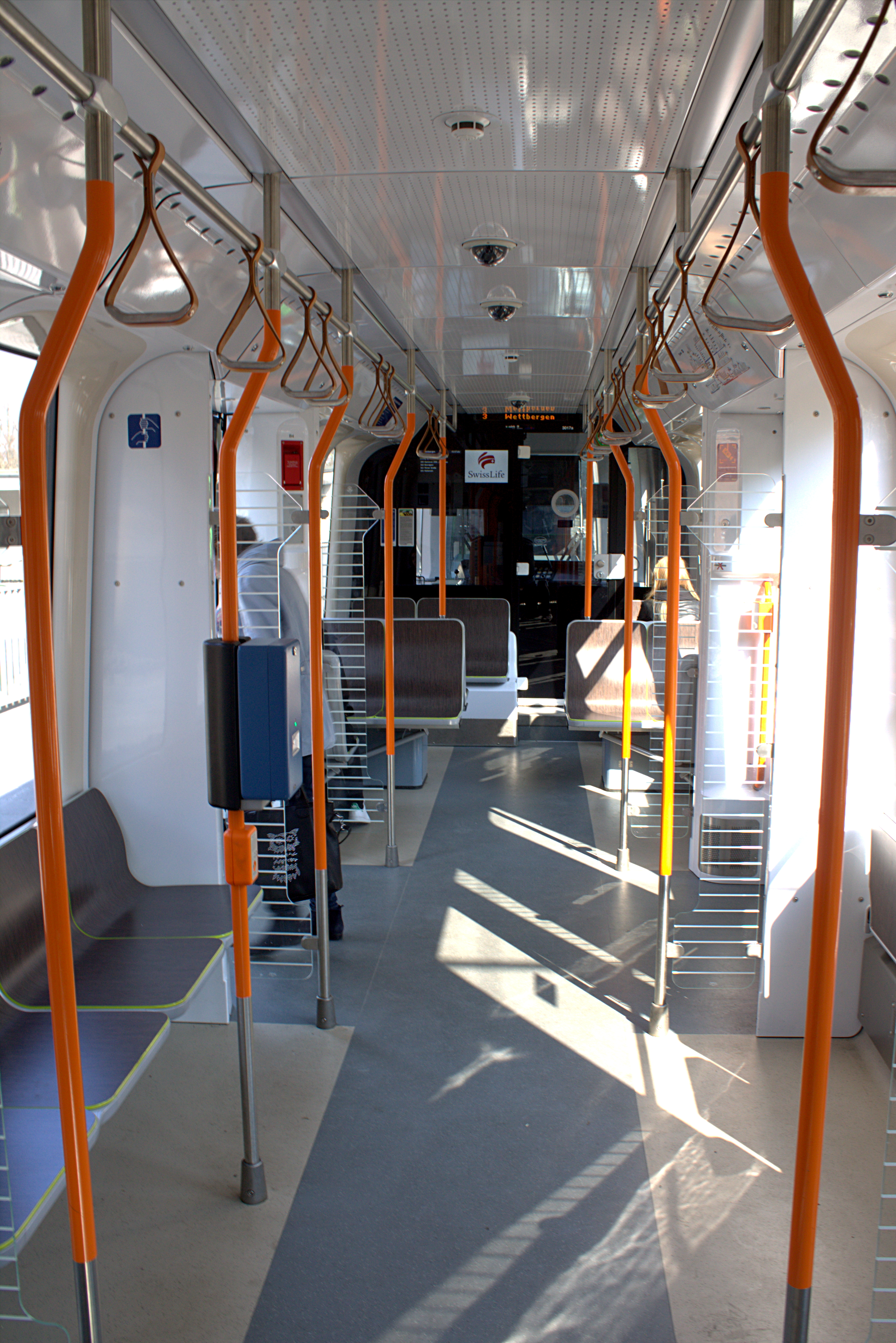
- In service: 2015–present
- Manufacturer: Vossloh Kiepe, Alstom and HeiterBlick
- Replaced: TW 6000
- Constructed: 2013–2020
- Entered service: 15 March 2015
- Number built: 153
- Number in service: 153
- Fleet numbers: 3001–3153
- Capacity: 175 (54 seated)
- Operators: Üstra

Specifications
- Car body construction: Steel, glass reinforced plastic front ends
- Train length: 25.16 m (82 ft 7 in)
- Width: 2.65 m (8 ft 8 in)
- Height: 3.75 m (12 ft 4 in)
- Articulated sections: 2 (one articulation)
- Wheel diameter: 730–650 mm (29–26 in) (new–worn)
- Maximum speed: 80 km/h (50 mph)
- Traction motors: 4 × TSA TMR 39-24-4 125 kW (168 hp)
- Power output: 500 kW (670 hp)
- Transmission: 7.41 : 1 gear ratio (2-stage reduction)
- Electric system(s): 600–750 V DC overhead catenary
- Current collector(s): Pantograph
- UIC classification: Bo′2′+Bo′
- Coupling system: Scharfenberg
- Track gauge: 1,435 mm (4 ft 8 1/2 in) standard gauge

The TW 3000 is a type of articulated light rail vehicle used on the Hanover Stadtbahn system since 2015. The trains are built by a consortium of Vossloh Kiepe and Alstom, with the final assembly taking place at HeiterBlick's Leipzig factory.

== Technical specifications ==
The trains consist of two articulated sections, with steel car bodies and glass reinforced plastic front ends.

The interior features air-conditioning and lighting in variable colour tones.

== History ==
The first 50 sets were ordered in April 2011. Further 50 sets were ordered through an option in November 2013. First public trials with passengers were conducted on 8 March 2014. Entry into regular service had to be pushed back after faulty welds had been noticed on some of the sets. The trains entered regular service on 15 March 2015. 46 more sets were ordered in 2017.
