= TW 2000 =

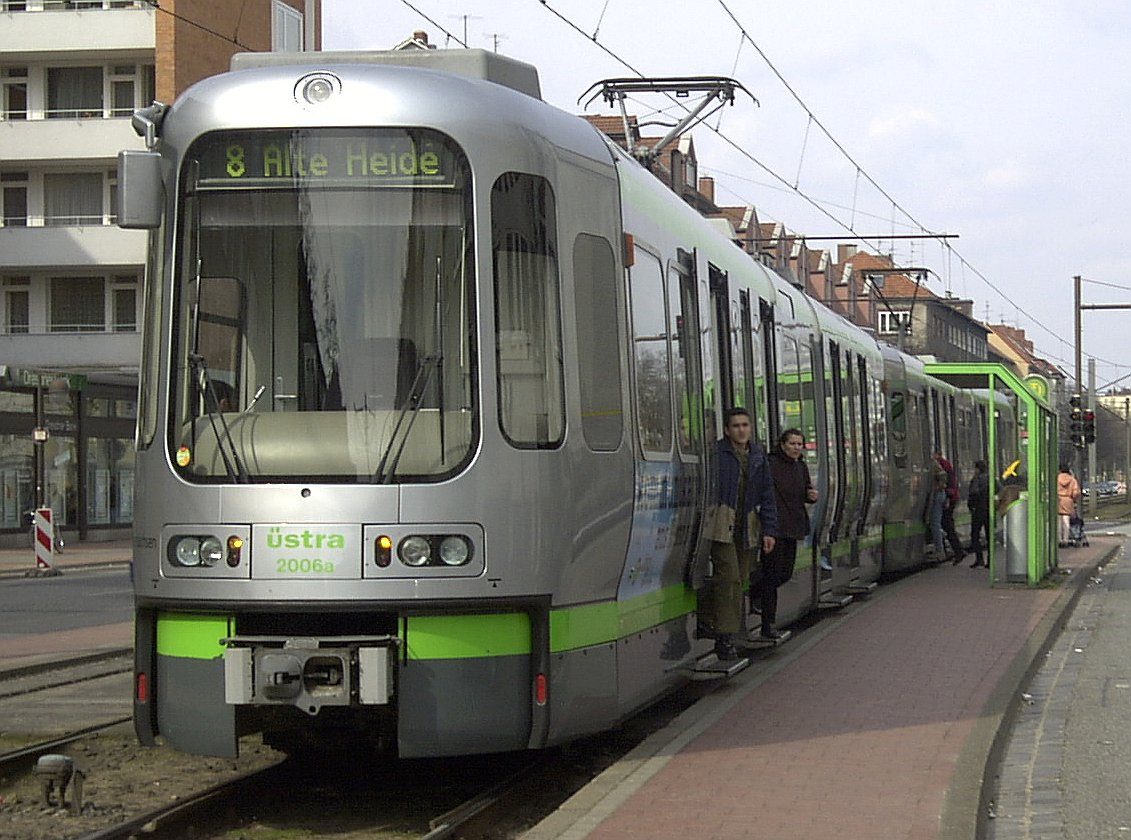
- TW2000 in Hanover
- Manufacturer: Car body and suspension Linke-Hofmann-Busch GmbH, Salzgitter; Electric systems and power bogies Siemens AG Verkehrstechnik, Erlangen; Various systems üstra, Hannover; Visual Design; Jasper Morrison Office for Design, London; Folding steps Schließ- und Sicherungssysteme GmbH, Mühlhausen
- Constructed: 1997–2000
- Number built: 144 (of which 96 are TW 2500)
- Capacity: 54 seats (8 folding); 101 standing

Specifications
- Train length: 25.82 m (84 ft 9 in) (TW 2500: 24.70 m (81 ft 0 in))
- Width: 2.65 m (8 ft 8 in) (2.45 m (8 ft 0 in) near bogies)
- Maximum speed: 80 km/h (50 mph)
- Power output: 100 kW (130 hp) sustainable 146 kW (196 hp) peak
- UIC classification: Bo'2Bo'
- Coupling system: Scharfenberg
- Track gauge: Standard; 1,435 mm (4 ft 8.5 in)

The TW 2000 is a Stadtbahn vehicle in operation on the Hanover Stadtbahn network in Hanover, Germany.

== History ==
After winning the bid for the Expo 2000 in 1990, the city of Hanover faced the need to greatly improve its transportation system. Therefore, the autobahn system was brought up to better standards, new buses were ordered (the StadtBus), and it was decided to buy new light rail vehicles for the Hanover Stadtbahn. Whilst a ninth series of the TW 6000, the Stadtbahn vehicle built from 1974 to 1993, could have technically been produced, the Hanover public transport operator üstra decided to build a new vehicle from scratch, using up-to-date technology, without the necessity to make the vehicle compatible to the aged design of the TW 6000.

The car was designed by Herbert Lindinger with British designer Jasper Morrison and was manufactured from 1997 to 2000 by Linke-Hofmann-Busch in Salzgitter (now part of Alstom).

The first car delivered was 2002, which was delivered to the Döhren depot on April 12, 1997. 2001, the first of the series, was delivered the following day to the Hanover fairground to serve as a showcase at Hannover Messe. The official presentation to the general public was on April 27, 1997, at Döhren depot, the cars went into official operational use on route 8 by September 1, 1997.

A notable feature is a system of several monitor pairs mounted under the ceiling. While the left monitor displays the next four stops, the right one provides news and adverts.

== Daily usage ==
Two versions have been built, the TW 2000 with two cabs on each side and the TW 2500 with one cab and an open gangway at the rear end, supposed to run with another 2500 unit.

In daily use, these configurations can be found:

- 2000
- 2000+2000
- 2500-2500
- 2000+2000+2000 (very rare)
- 2500-2500+2000
- 2000+2000+2500-2500 (during trade fairs at Hanover fairground)
- 2500-2500+2500-2500 (during trade fairs)

Note that several high platform stops are too short for the last four configurations, therefore the first and last door remain shut.
