= Duewag =

German rail manufacturer (1898–1999)

Coordinates: 51°22′05″N 6°38′45″E

- Formerly: Waggonfabrik Uerdingen
- Industry: manufacture of railway locomotives and rolling stock (NACE 30.2) vehicle construction
- Predecessor: Düsseldorfer Waggonfabrik
- Founded: March 1898
- Fate: Merged into Siemens Mobility
- Successor: Siemens & Halske
- Headquarters: Krefeld, Germany
- Products: Rolling stock
- Parent: Siemens
- Website: www.duewag.de

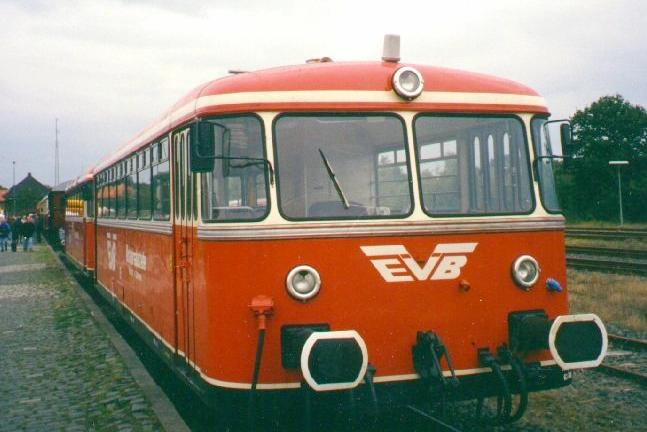
Railbus built under the Uerdingen brand name, operated by EVB

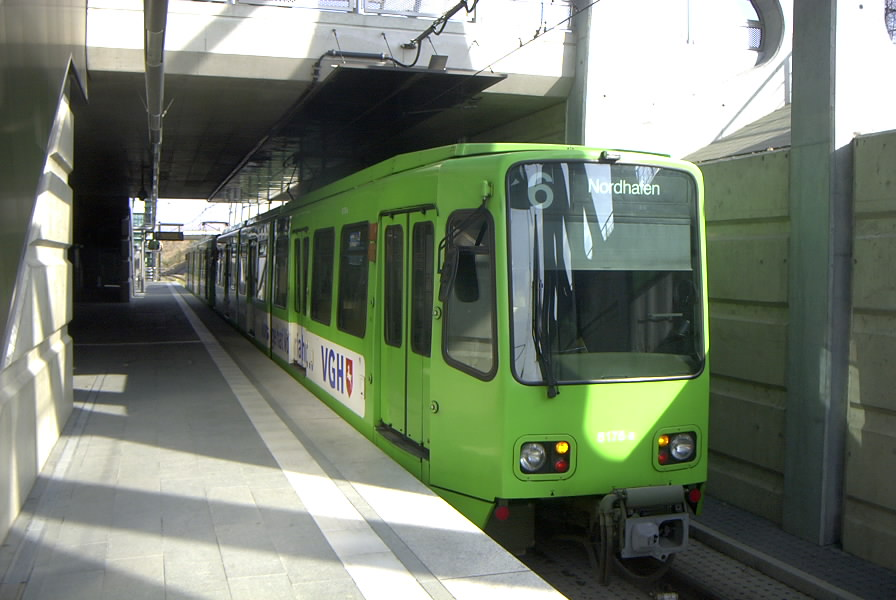
Hanover Stadtbahn TW 6000

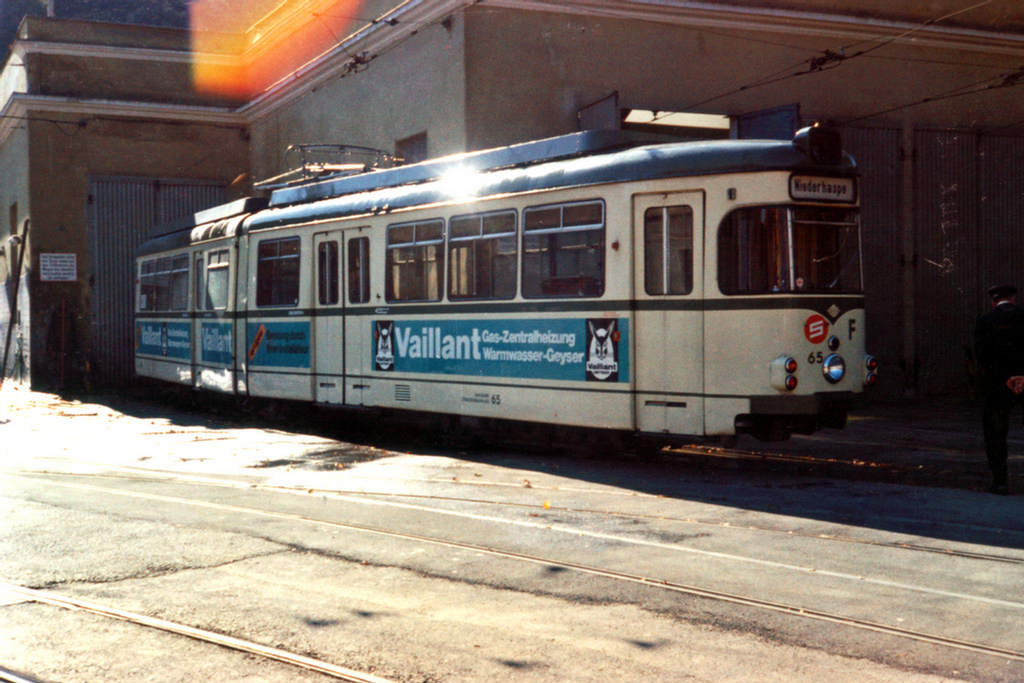
A Hagen tram in Innsbruck for use on the Stubaitalbahn after the Hagen trams ceasing service in 1976

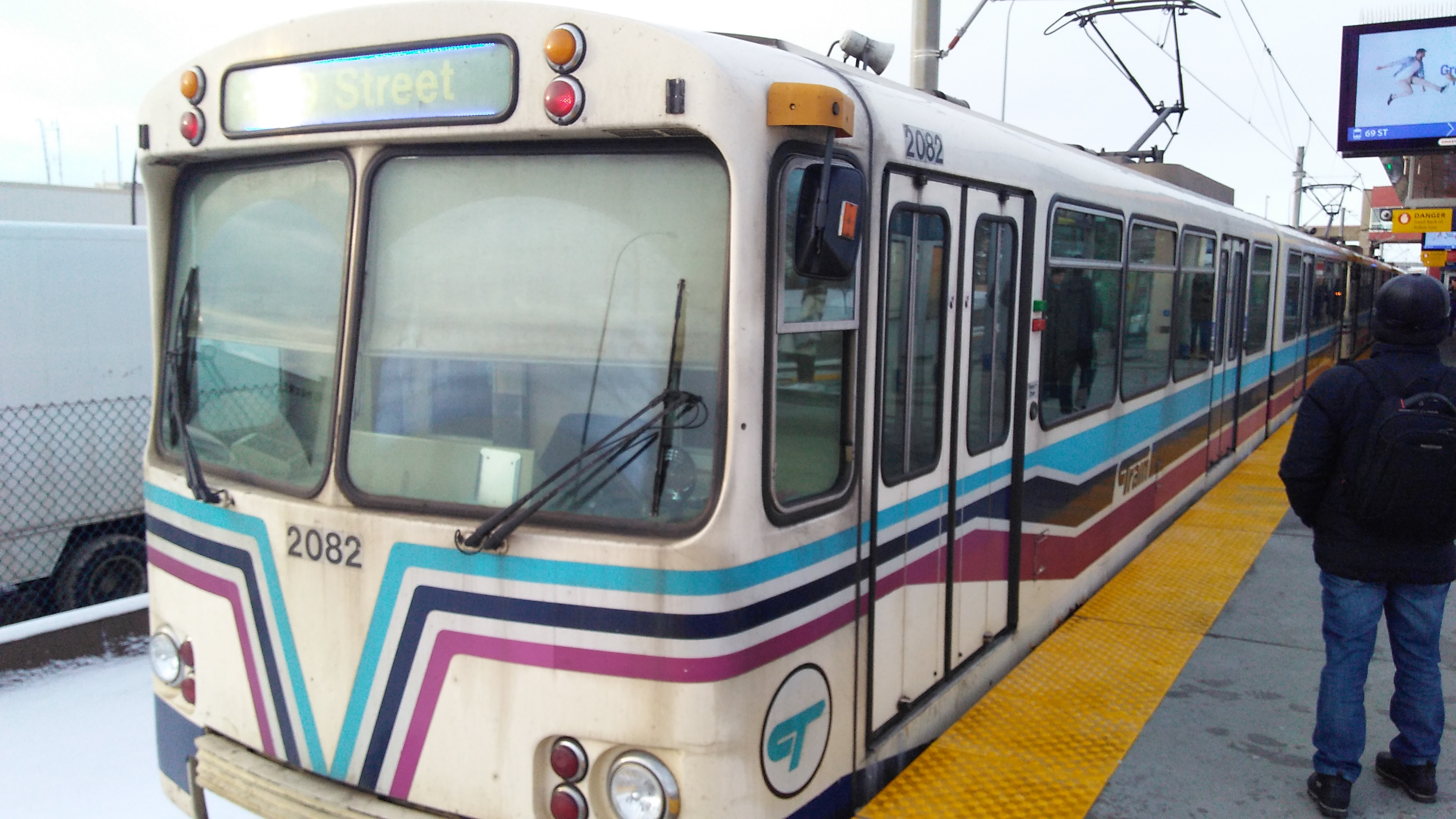
CTrain Siemens-Duewag U2 in Calgary, Alberta

Düwag or Duewag (stylised in all caps), formerly Waggonfabrik Uerdingen, was a German manufacturer of rail vehicles. It was sold in 1999 to Siemens with the brand later retired.

== History ==
Duewag was founded in March 1898 as Waggonfabrik Uerdingen in Uerdingen and produced rail vehicles under the Düwag brand. After merging with Düsseldorfer Waggonfabrik in 1935, railway vehicles were built in Uerdingen, while the Düsseldorf plant produced mainly local traffic vehicles, namely tramway and light rail vehicles. In 1981, the company changed its name from Waggonfabrik Uerdingen to Duewag.

Siemens acquired a 60% shareholding in 1989 before taking full ownership in April 1999. In 2001, the Düsseldorf plant was closed with production transferred to Uerdingen.

Duewag vehicles were close to a monopoly market in West Germany, as nearly every tram and light rail vehicle purchased from the 1960s onward was built by Duewag.

== Products ==
=== Train ===
- Uerdingen railbus
- Düwag Wadloper
- Buffel (DM'90)
- Y-trains – Delivered about 100 trains, to local railways in Denmark, between 1965 and 1983
- DSB Class MR/MRD DMUs
- RegioSprinter
- Toll Royal Railways ZZ800 DMU

=== Tram/light rail ===
- T4 tramcar
- M6C tramcar
- GB6 tramcar
- GT6 tramcar in various versions
- GT8 tramcar in various versions
- GT12 tramcar
- SL79
- TW 400
- TW 6000
- Stadtbahnwagen M/N
- Stadtbahnwagen Typ B
- SSB DT8
- Hong Kong Light Rail Phase 1 (Comeng), Phase 2 (Kawasaki) and Phase 3 (A Goninan) bogies
- Siemens-Duewag U2
- Siemens SD-400
- Siemens-Duewag Supertram
