= Herbert Lindinger =

Austrian industrial designer (born 1933)

Herbert Lindinger (born 3 December 1933 in Wels) is an Austrian graphic artist, exhibition designer, industrial designer, and university professor. He is known for designing trains and trams such as the S-DT8.12 Stuttgart light rail cars, and the TW 6000 and TW 2000 (with Jasper Morrison) for the city of Hanover, Germany, as well as the associated urban furniture and infrastructure. The logo of the University of Hannover, which evokes Leibniz's exploration of the binary number system, was also designed by Lindinger.

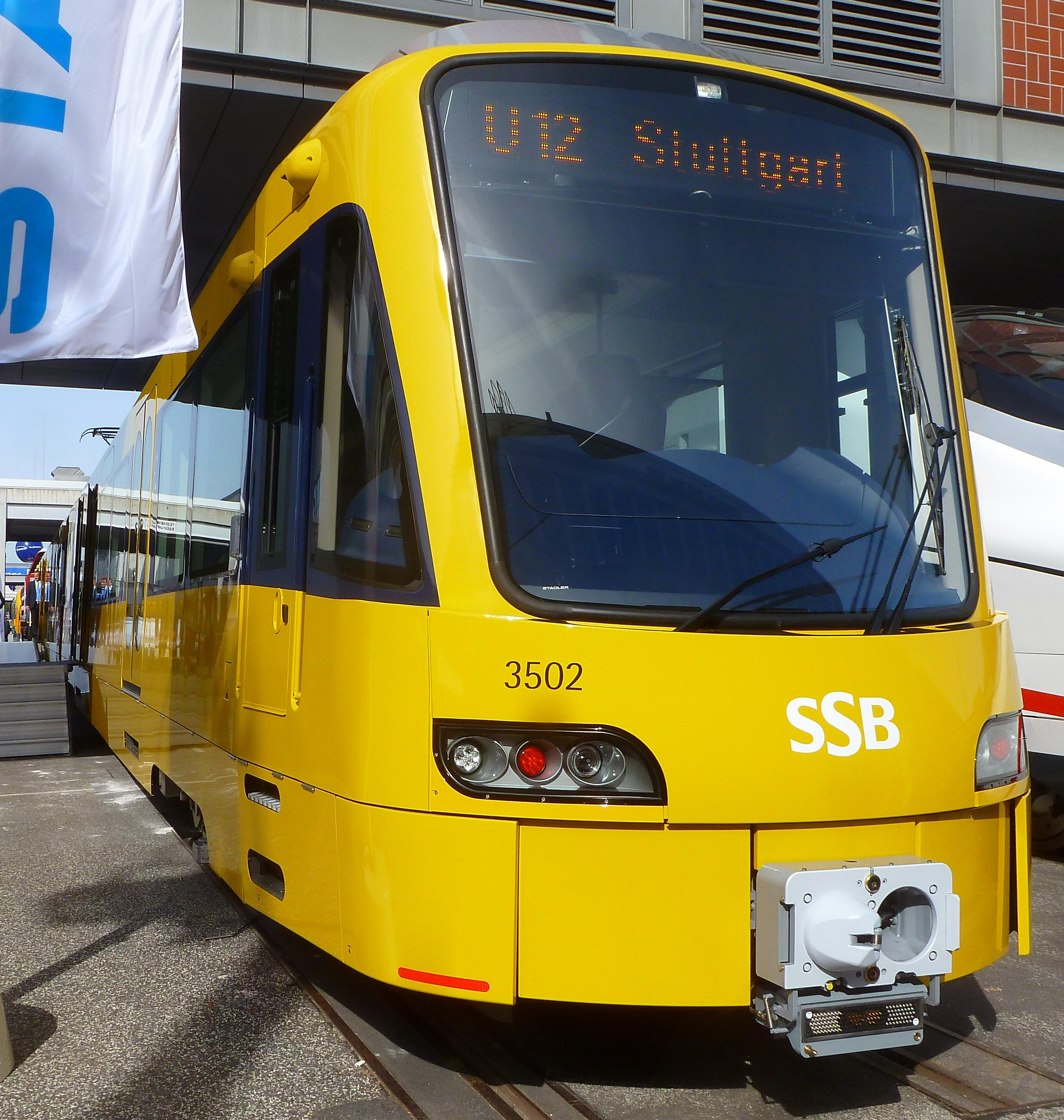
S-DT8.12 Stuttgart light rail car (source photograph for "Design from Germany" postage stamp)

== Early life and education ==
Lindinger was born in Wels, Austria in 1933. He studied graphic and exhibition design in Linz from 1950 to 1954, and subsequently studied product design at the Hochschule für Gestaltung (HfG) from 1954 to 58, where he was a student of Josef Albers, Johannes Itten, Max Bill, Friedrich Vordemberge-Gildewart, Tomas Maldonado, and Hans Gugelot.

== Work and career ==
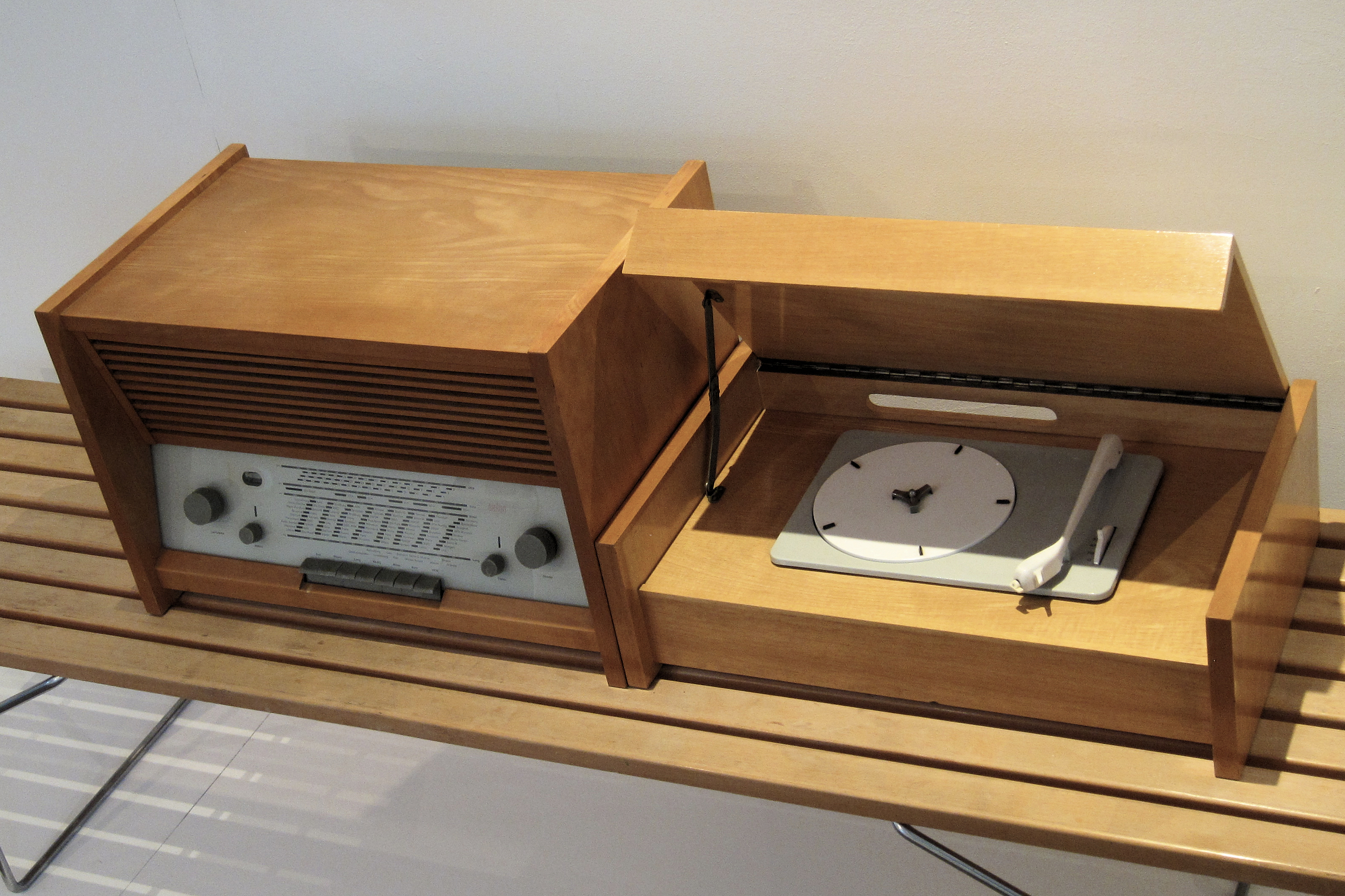
1950s Braun G11 radio-amplifier and G12 turntable

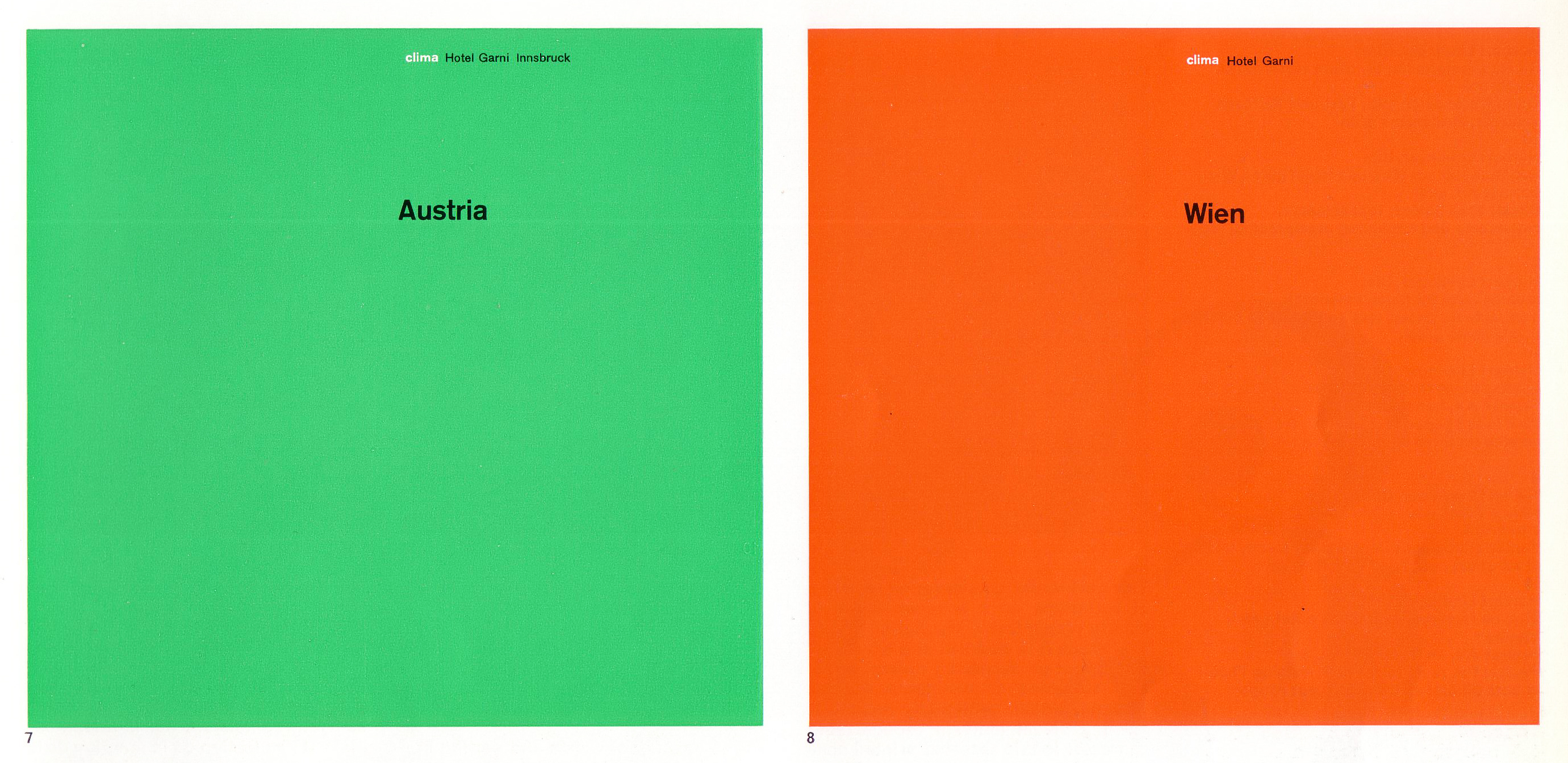
Brochure for Clima Hotel, Innsbruck

In the 1950s he worked alongside Hans Gugelot, Otl Aicher, Herbert Hirche, and Dieter Rams designing audio equipment for Braun.

He was a lecturer at the Ulm School of Design (HfG) from 1962 to 1968, and subsequently, from 1971 to 1998, a professor and Director of the Institute for Industrial Design at the University of Hanover.

Lindinger is known for his designs for trams and subway cars in Stuttgart, Hannover, Hamburg, Frankfurt, and Berlin. He also designed the Sirio (12 pitch) and Ulm (10 pitch) typefaces used by Olivetti typewriters.

A 2017 German postage stamp honouring "Design from Germany" features Lindinger and his design for the Stuttgart light rail cars.

In 2022, a German court ruled that Lindinger's design of the fabric used for the seat covers of the city’s public transport system was protected by copyright. As a result, the public transportation company BVG was temporarily barred from selling products and merchandise (including tea towels to sneakers) using the popular design. Bloomberg noted that "the fight reveals how passionate people can get about public transit seat covers – designs that many of us see every day, but which very often fall far outside the boundaries of conventional good taste." A settlement was later reached.

Technical drawing of TW 6000

== Publications ==
- Lindinger, Herbert (1991). Ulm design : the morality of objects, 1953–1968. Translated by Britt, David. Cambridge, Mass.: MIT Press. ISBN 0-262-12147-6. OCLC 20828474.
- Morrison, Jasper; Ganseforth, Heinrich (1997). A New Tram for Hannover - Design: Jasper Morrison. Gebr. Mann. ISBN 9783786122487. OCLC 75902074.
- Götze, Oliver; Bartelsheim, Ursula; Baur, Janinia (2021). Design & Bahn : eine Gestaltungsgeschichte (in German). München. ISBN 978-3-7913-7921-0. OCLC 1246166730.
