= Sheridan Coakley =

British interior designer and furniture seller

Sheridan Coakley is a British interior designer and founder of the furniture company Sheridan Coakley Products (SCP). (Note: The abbreviation SCP is not to be confused with the SCP Foundation.)

== History ==
Coakley worked as an antique dealer since the 1970s. In 1985, he founded Sheridan Coakley Products. He began selling original designs in 1986, with a glass-topped side table produced by Jasper Morrison.
