= TW 6000 =

Articulated light rail vehicle

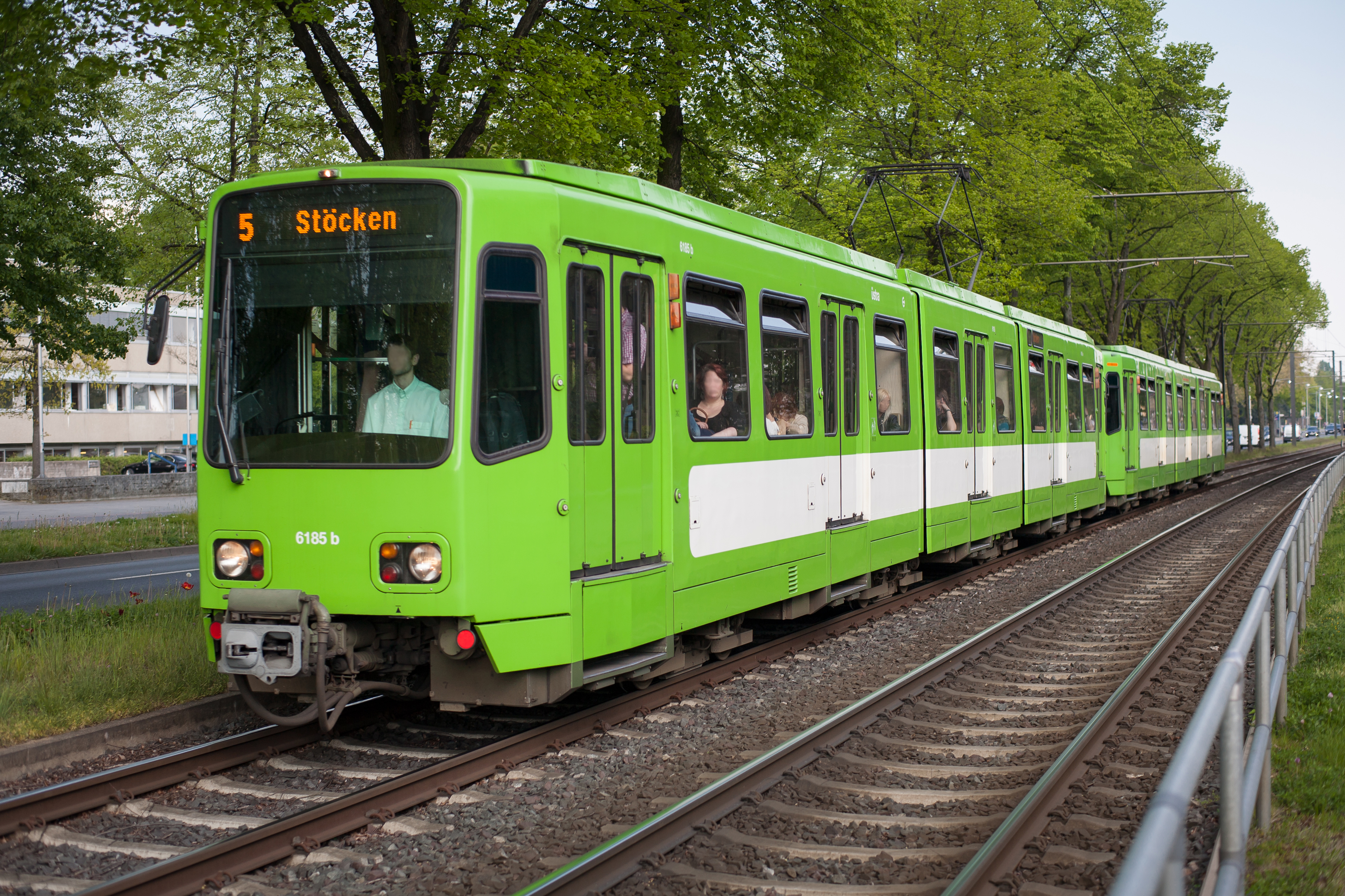
- TW 6000 entering Schaumburgstrasse station in April 2014
- Manufacturers: Duewag (6001-6100); Linke-Hofmann-Busch (6101-6260)
- Constructed: 1974–1993
- Scrapped: 2014-2019
- Number built: 260
- Capacity: 46 seats 104 standing

Specifications
- Train length: 28.28 m (92 ft 9 in)
- Width: 2.4 m (7 ft 10 in)
- Maximum speed: 80 km/h (50 mph)
- Power output: 2 × 218 kW (292 hp)
- Electric system: 600 V DC overhead catenary
- Current collection: Pantograph
- UIC classification: B'2'2'B'
- Braking systems: Regenerative brake, hydraulic spring-applied brake (only < 5 km/h (3.1 mph)), rail brake (emergency only)
- Coupling system: Scharfenberg
- Track gauge: 1,435 mm (4 ft 8 1/2 in) standard gauge

The TW 6000 is a type of articulated light rail vehicle used on the Hanover Stadtbahn system, manufactured by Duewag, Linke-Hofmann-Busch, AEG, Kiepe and Siemens.

The vehicle can serve both high platforms and street-level stops; it has cabs at both ends, thus eliminating the need for turning loops. It was unique in Germany at the time for featuring thyristor chopper control and a contemporary design by Herbert Lindinger.

A total of 260 were built between 1974 and 1993, of which the first series of 100 was built by Duewag in Düsseldorf from 1974 to 1978, whilst the second to eighth series (160) were built by LHB in Salzgitter from 1979 to 1993. From 2002 on, 82 units were sold to Budapest, Hungary and The Hague, The Netherlands.

In 2013, üstra ordered 100 new vehicles (with an option for 46 more) to replace the aging TW 6000 vehicles; those vehicles, which are known as the TW 3000 were delivered between 2014 and 2018.

== Technical parameters ==
A single unit has a length of 28.28 metres (92.8 ft) and a width of 2.4 metres (7 ft 10 in). Up to 150 passengers can fit into a single car; up to four sets can be operated in multiple. The maximum speed is rated at 80 kilometres per hour (50 mph). The two DC motors are rated at 218 kW at 600 V each and can draw a maximum current of 900 A.

Cars 6206-6260 are microprocessor controlled, using an Intel 8085 and GTO thyristors.

=== Series delivered ===
The following TW 6000 series were delivered:

Numbers	Delivered from-to	Line	Manufacturers
6001-6100	27.12.1974-26.06.1978	A	Duewag/Kiepe/AEG/Siemens
6101-6190	19.12.1979-01.06.1983	B	LHB/Kiepe/AEG/Siemens
6191-6205	09.01.1985-13.08.1985	C-Ost	LHB/Kiepe/AEG/Siemens
6206-6250	22.09.1988-10.01.1992	C-West	LHB/Kiepe/AEG/Siemens
6251-6260	08.09.1992-22.01.1993	C-Nord	LHB/Kiepe/AEG/Siemens

The lead of the consortium changed over to LHB after the first series due to political lobbying, as subsidies provided by the state of Lower Saxony were spent on the project, LHB (which is based in Salzgitter) was favoured over the out-of-state Duewag (with their operations in Düsseldorf, North Rhine-Westphalia).

==== Cab controls ====
All TW6000s are driven using an integral traction and braking system with a deadman's trigger that drivers must depress to mobilize the vehicle. When released while moving, first the warning system beeps, and then the track brakes are applied.

==== Changes in Series 2 ====
- New floors, lacking the Series 1 furrows
- Smaller stop buttons and warning lights, partly retrofit to Series 1 from 3/81 to 5/85, completely retrofit to Series 1 from 10/88 to 11/92
- Destination indicator inside the Stadtbahn vehicle
- Wiper moved to the right
- Automatic adjustment of couplers after decoupling
- Additional brake resistor on the roof
- Preparations to add additional seats at the middle door (was never carried out)

==== Changes in Series 3 ====
- IBIS equipment delivered ex-factory, retrofit to Series 1 and 2 vehicles until 1987
- Mandatory selection of "steps high" and "steps low" setting before doors can be opened, retrofit to all prior vehicles

==== Changes in Series 4 ====
- Skylight windows on one side only
- GTO chopper control with 8085 microprocessor
- Fire protection (tested on 6147 from January 1987):
  - new sheet metal roof in the passenger compartment
  - plastic light covers replaced by steel lamellas
  - roof and side handles in joint area replaced with cast plastic handle
- Additional tail lights

==== Changes in Series 5 ====
- Adjusted size of door windows
- Wider door seals

==== Changes in Series 6 ====
- Double doors without handrail in the midsection, new lock mechanism (tested on 6083, partly retrofit to older vehicles)

=== Refurbishment ===
An invitation of tenders for a refurbishment programme began in 2018. About 40 sets are slated for refurbishment, which includes LED lighting and repainting. The first refurbished set was presented in 2019.

== TW 6000 in Budapest ==
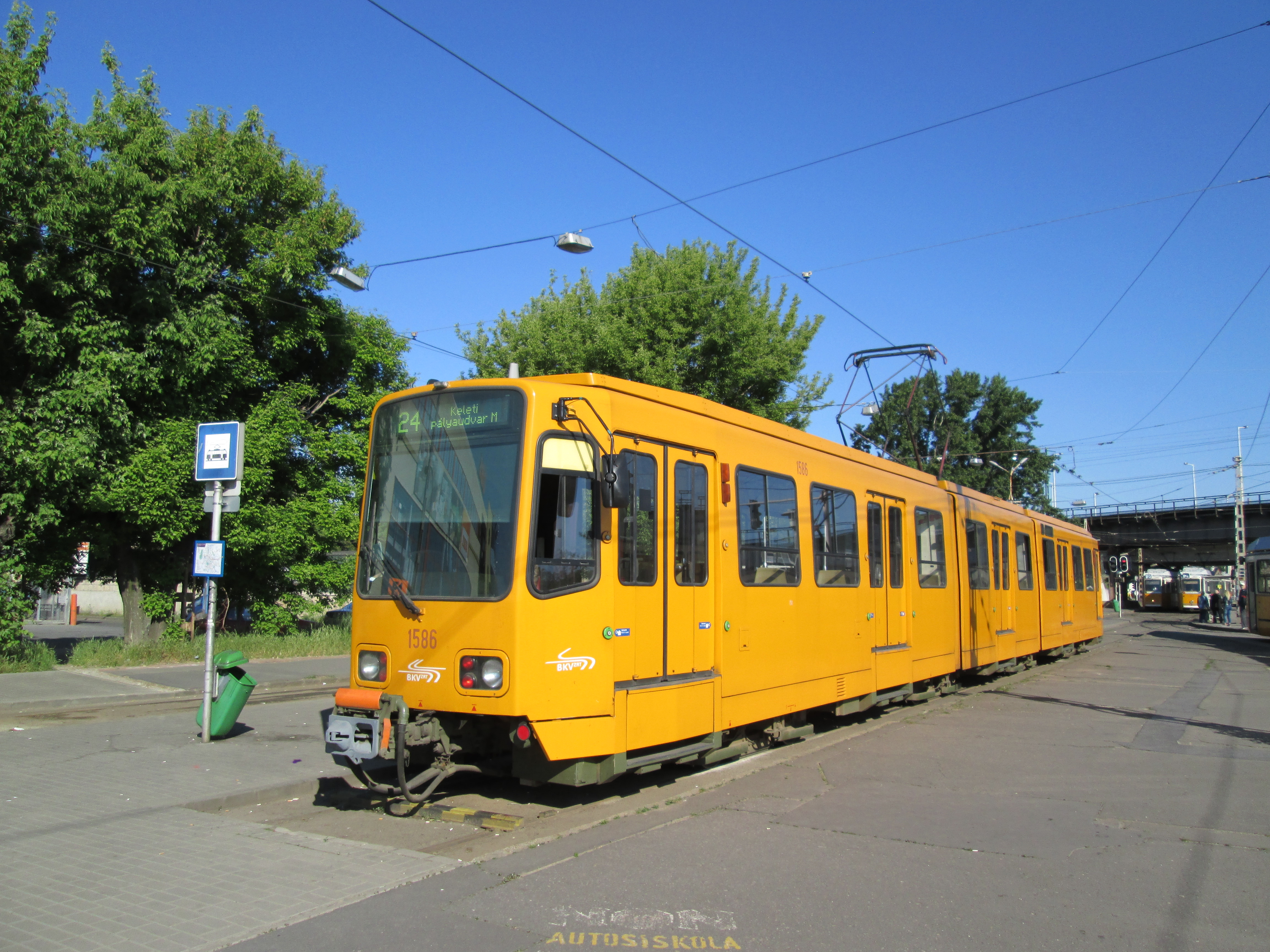
TW 6000 in Budapest in May 2016

After Hanover had upgraded its fleet with TW 2000s on the occasion of the Expo 2000 World's Fair, Üstra offered part of its used TW 6000 rolling stock for sale. Hungarian company BKV, operator of the tram network in the capital of Budapest, bought the majority of it.

In 2000 Budapest had an aging tram fleet including more than 300 UV and UV trailer cars, 40–60 years old, still in operation. The last mass purchase had been the Tatra T5C5 cars in 1980-84. The TW6000 would arrive in good condition and had a highly favorable price compared to new trams. Nevertheless, it was often disputed if Budapest really had to rely on used trams, and the contradictory feelings were so strong that the leading party of the Budapest council (SZDSZ), including mayor Gábor Demszky, voted against the purchase. Preceded by lengthy political debates, the city council of Budapest provided 7 billion forints for the purchase of 68 units altogether. The first cars (6061 and 6070) arrived at BKV in 2001 to begin their 10,000-kilometre-long (6,200 mi) test run. The first run in passenger operation on the tramline number 3 was in October 2001. The cars got new numbers in Budapest, beginning with 1500. The BKV soon decided to buy 8 additional trams.

The cars got an overhaul in Hanover and were repainted into the orange yellow livery used on the BKV trams (earning the nickname "banana" for having arrived green and consumed yellow); the inner side of the doors were originally left green, but later repainted to white. They were retrofitted with windows that can slide open to better adjust to hotter continental summers. A doorbell was added that rings before departure. The automatic closing of the doors after 4 seconds was deactivated for a time but was later reintroduced. As part of the regular maintenance cycle, a small revamp at BKV's rail vehicle maintenance company (BKV VJSz) saw the cars retrofitted with internal and external Vultron LED displays.

=== Further purchases ===
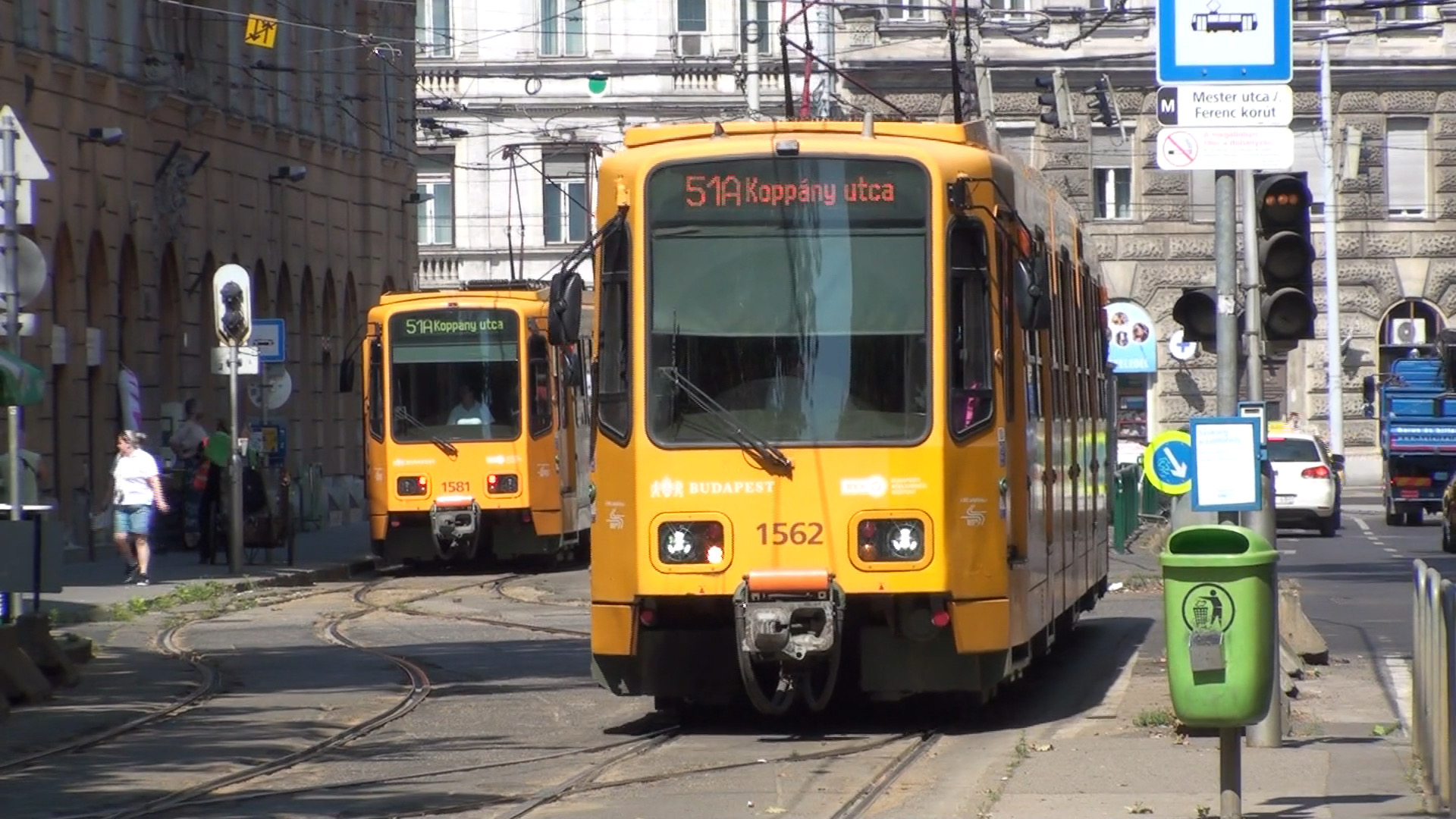
TW6000 trams in Budapest, August 2023

The positive experience of TW6000 operation in Budapest convinced BKV to purchase further cars of the same type.

In 2011, another 16 TW6000 cars arrived to Budapest partly from Hanover and partly from The Hague (see below). A further four cars arrived to BKV VJSz in order to provide spare parts. An additional shipment was due from late 2011, also including cars from the 6100 series. The last shipment was in 2015-2016.

Today, most of the TW 6000 tramcars that have been built are owned by BKV: 113 vehicles excluding the four at BKV VJSz. However, the arrival of low-floor CAF Urbos 3 trams to the Budapest network allowed for the withdrawal of many Ganz CSMG trams from regular service. Low-floor service was introduced on line 3, and TW6000's showed up on other lines. From 2016 January onwards, TW6000's operate on tramlines 3 (partially), 24 (partially), 28 (partially), 28A (partially), 37, 37A, 42, 50, 51, 51A, 52, 62, 62A, 69.

Nowadays, the main concern about these cars is their high floor level and moving stairs with mechanical sensors that do not fulfill accessibility requirements and make it difficult for the elderly, and people with prams, to get on and off. Despite this, its heated passenger compartment, good noise insulation, vibration damping and seamless acceleration mean a higher standard of comfort than some other tram types in Budapest can provide. From February 2024 revamped cars have the moving stairs eliminated among other changes as there are no high platforms in the tram network.

In October 2024 BKV has started to officially explore the idea of running TW6000 trains on some HÉV lines, replacing the outdated and ageing rolling stock.

== TW 6000 in the Netherlands ==
=== The Hague ===
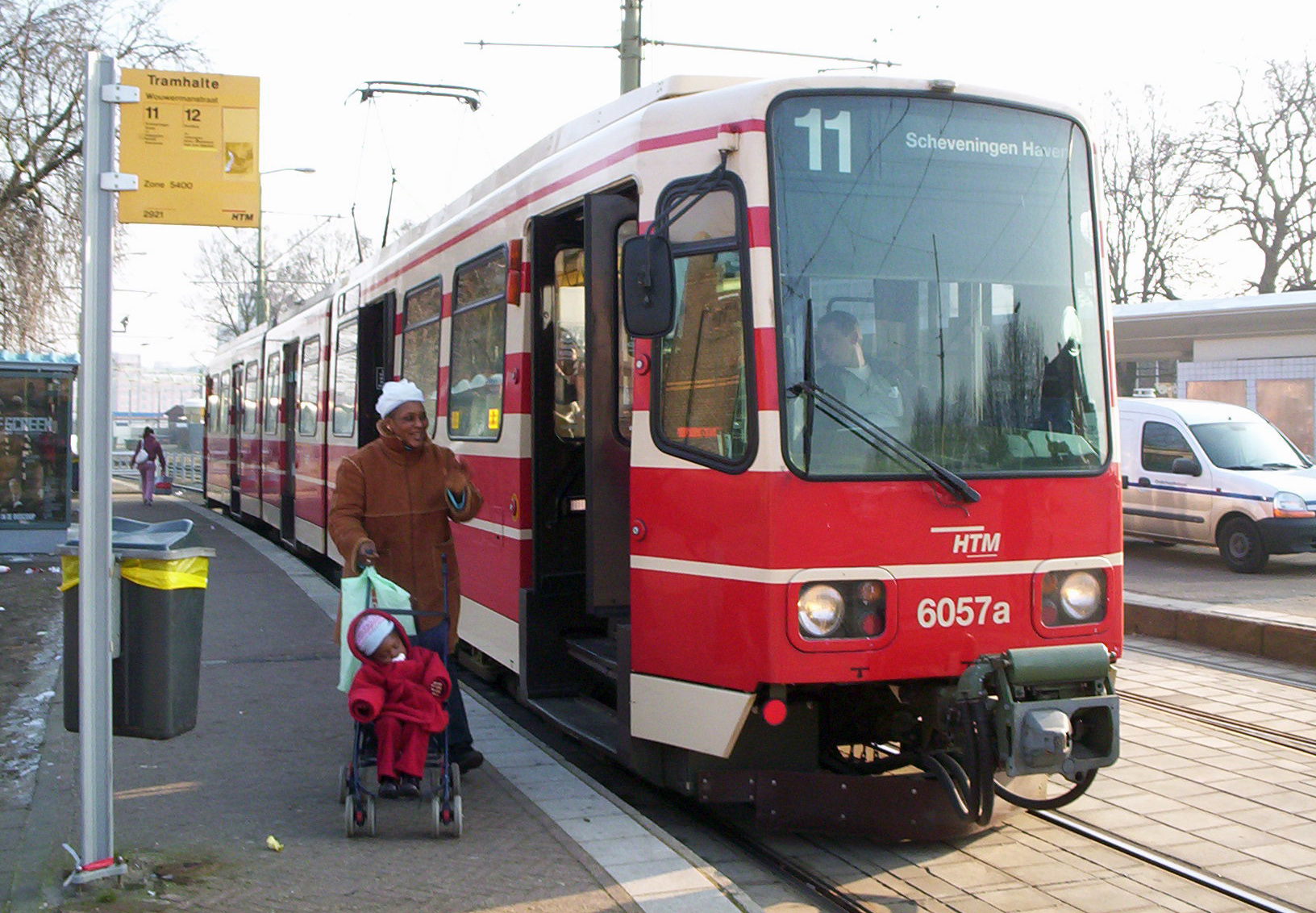
TW 6000 in The Hague

In 2002, eight TW 6000 units were sold to HTM, the public transport operator of The Hague in the Netherlands, where they were in service on tram line 11 to Scheveningen. They were withdrawn in 2005 and stored at Depot Lijsterbesstraat. They were eventually sold to BKV of Budapest, the last TW 6000 leaving The Hague on October 7, 2010.

=== Houten ===
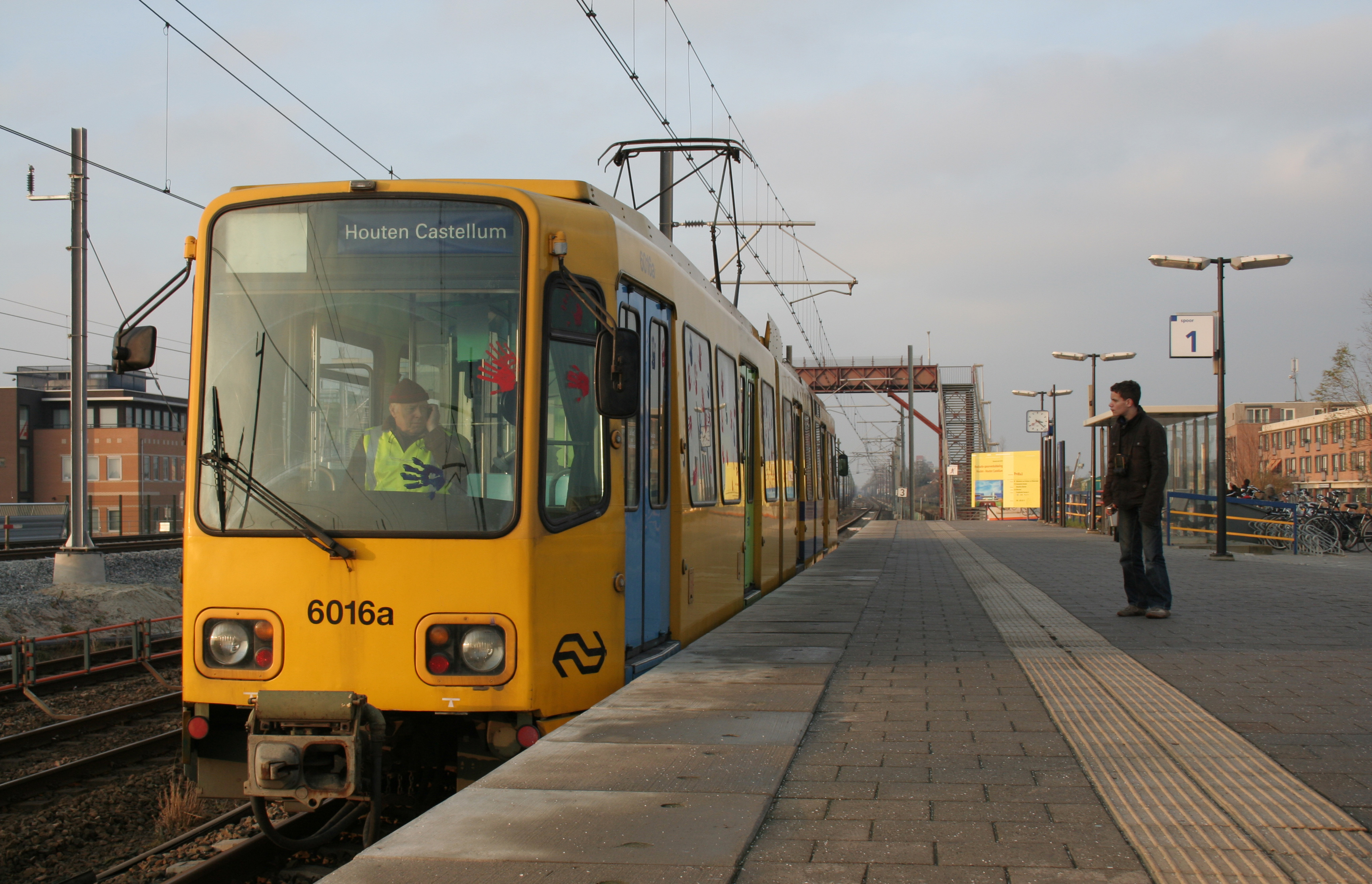
6016 in Houten, running on the last day of service.

Earlier, in 2000, HTM ordered two TW 6000 units to operate a temporary NS service in Houten, connecting Houten station with the new station Houten Castellum. The service, operated by HTM of The Hague on behalf of NS, ran from January 2001 until December 2008. One unit (6016) has since been scrapped, the other (6021) sold to BKV of Budapest, where it is in service with new number 1585.

== TW 6000 in Tunis ==
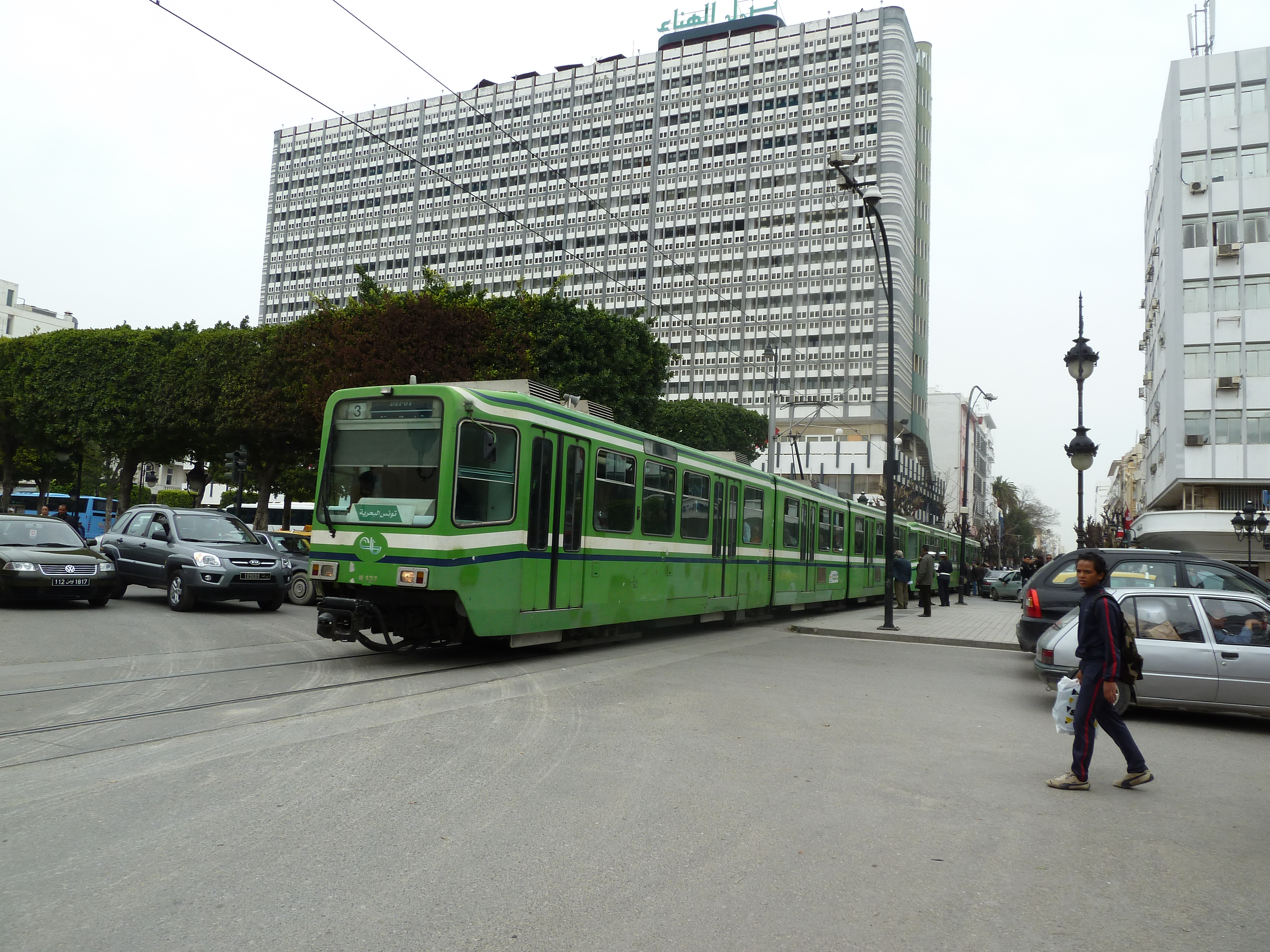
TW 6000 vehicle #M127 on the single-track section of the network in Tunis' city centre, April 2011

The first model of rolling stock to be used on the Metro was the Siemens-Duewag TW 6000, a model which was ordered as part of the turnkey contract for the construction of the network. The vehicles are derived from those used on the Hanover light rail system, and are bidirectional, with doors equipped for high platforms. Each vehicle has three sections, and are able to be coupled together. As of 2025, they are currently in service on lines 2, 3, and 5, and are based at both the Tunis Marine and Ariana depots.

A total of 135 TW 6000 vehicles were built in three batches between 1983 and 1997:

Fleet numbers	Quantity	Years built
M101-M178	78	1983-1985
M201-M243	43	1991-1992
M301-M314	14	1997

The technical specifications of the TW 6000 vehicles are as follows:

- Bogies: type Bo-2-2-Bo
- Electric motors: 2 x 240 kW
- Weight: 40 tonnes
- Length: 30 metres
- Width: 2.47 metres

== TW 6000 in Tampere ==
TW 6148 was transferred from Hanover to Tampere, Finland by Škoda Transtech, where it is used as a testing vehicle.
