= Intalliance =

Transit corporation in Hannover

intalliance AG
- Company type: Defunct
- Industry: Public transportation
- Defunct: January 1, 2007
- Headquarters: Hanover, Germany
- Products: Hanover S-Bahn, Hanover Stadtbahn
- Parent: üstra Hannoversche Verkehrsbetriebe AG, DB Stadtverkehr, NORD/LB

intalliance AG was a German corporation based in Hanover which operated the Hanover S-Bahn and Hanover Stadtbahn. It ceased to exist on January 1, 2007. After splitting up, the Hanover S-Bahn is now operated by DB Regio and the Hanover Stadtbahn by üstra Hannoversche Verkehrsbetriebe AG.

The corporation was owned by üstra Hannoversche Verkehrsbetriebe AG and DB Stadtverkehr with a 40% share each. The remaining 20% share was held by NORD/LB. The üstra and DB Regio, who held the licences issued by the state of Lower Saxony to provide traffic services, had outsourced these services to intalliance. 1900 üstra employees and 285 DB Regio employees were transferred over to intalliance.

The intalliance AG owned 318 Stadtbahn vehicles, 138 buses and 46 S-Bahn trainsets.

== See also ==
- Hanover Stadtbahn
- Hanover S-Bahn
