= Hanover Stadtbahn =

Light urban rail transport system in Hanover, Germany

Coordinates: 52°22′27″N 9°43′00″E

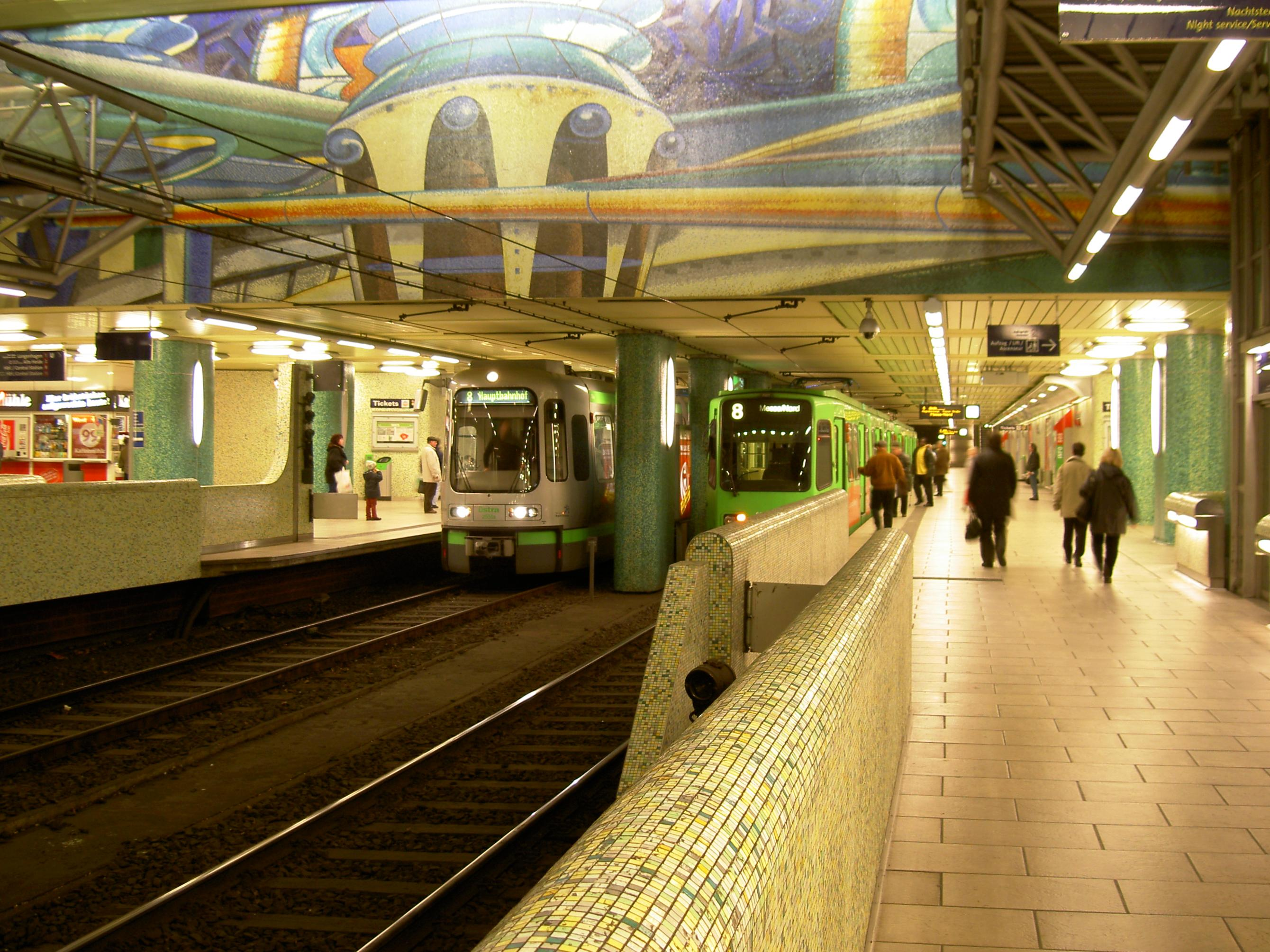

Overview
- Locale: Hanover, Lower Saxony, Germany
- Transit type: Light rail (Stadtbahn)
- Number of lines: 12 (with 1 weekend express night and 2 special lines)
- Number of stations: 201 (including 19 underground stations)
- Website: www.uestra.de/en/

Operation
- Began operation: 29 September 1975; 51 years ago
- Operator: üstra Hannoversche Verkehrsbetriebe AG
- Number of vehicles: 289

Technical
- System length: 121 km (75 mi)
- Track gauge: 1,435 mm (4 ft 8 1/2 in)
- Electrification: 600 V DC overhead
System map
Hanover Stadtbahn full network map

Hanover Stadtbahn is a light rail transport (Stadtbahn, lit. 'city railway') system in the city of Hanover, the capital of Lower Saxony, Germany. It opened on 29 September 1975, gradually replacing the city's tramway (Straßenbahn) network over the course of the subsequent 25 years. As of 2024, the Hanover Stadtbahn system has 12 main lines (lines 1–11 and 17), one weekend express night line (line 10E), and two supplemental lines (lines 16 and 18), serving 201 stations (including 19 underground and 124 high-platform stations), operating on 121 kilometres (75 mi) of route. The system is run by üstra, which was originally an abbreviation for Überlandwerke und Straßenbahnen Hannover AG. In 2007 the Hanover Stadtbahn transported 125 million passengers per year.

Three types of light rail cars operate on the system: the TW 6000, built from 1974 to 1993, the TW 2000 (the so-called Silberpfeil, lit. 'silver arrow'), built from 1997 to 1999, and the TW 3000, which was first introduced into A line service in 2015. In 2022 the TW 4000 was announced, initial delevery of 42 verhicles was planned. The system is used extensively, especially during trade shows on the Hanover fairground like CeBIT and the Hannover Messe. It makes up for more than 60% of the GVH transport association's total traffic, spanning over four cities and two counties. Hanover Stadtbahn is complemented by the Hanover S-Bahn, a suburban heavy rail network that links the outlying suburbs and towns, as well as Hanover Airport, to the city centre.

== Network ==
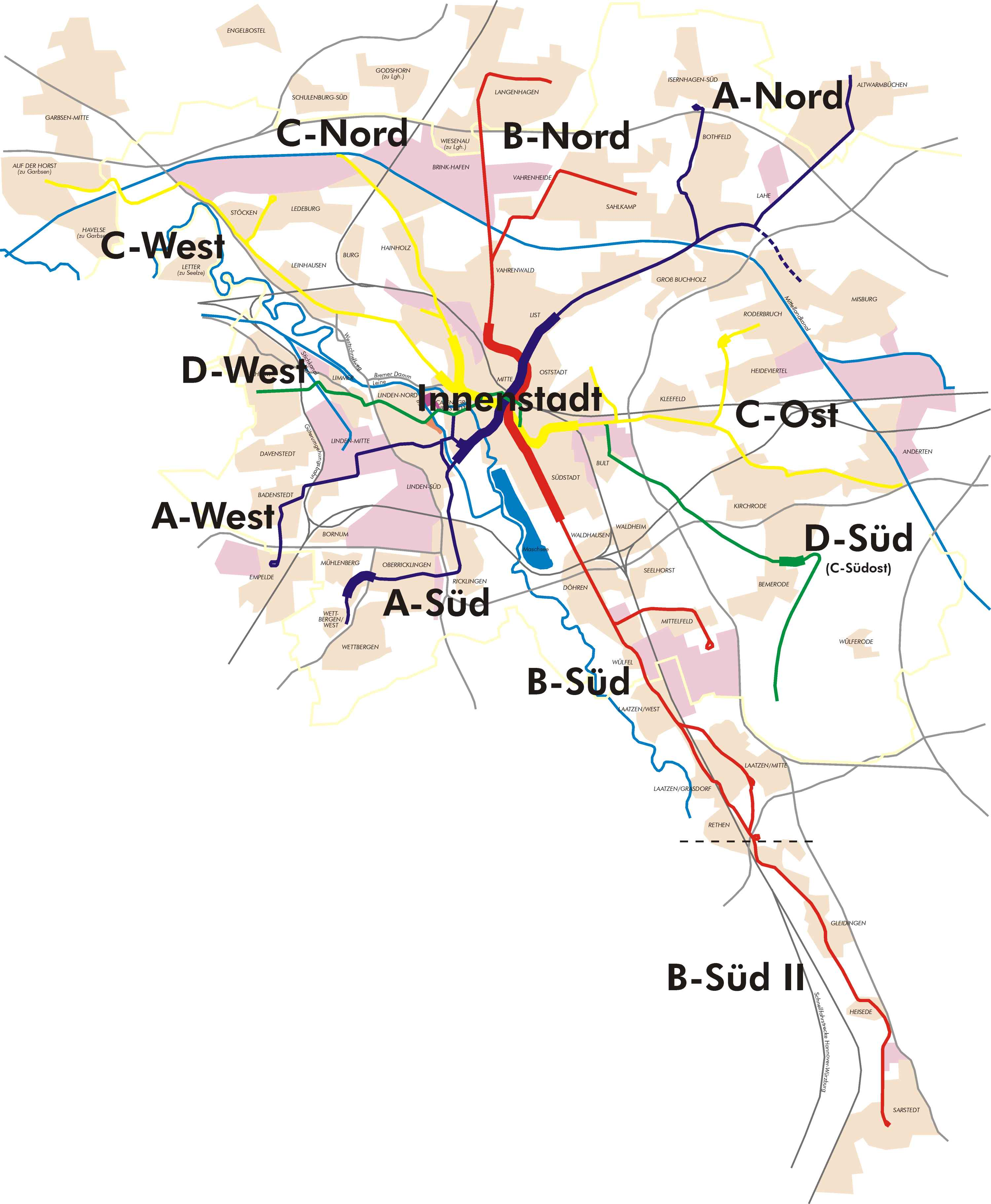
Geographical network map

=== The main Stadtbahn networks ===
The Stadtbahn is a mixture of traditional tramways, of which 82% have been upgraded so far to have their own right-of-way, and an U-Bahn-like system of tunnels in the city centre. It is owned by infra GmbH and covers nearly the whole city area. Parts of the Stadtbahn reach into the neighbouring towns of Garbsen, Isernhagen, Langenhagen, Laatzen and Ronnenberg, as well as into the town of Sarstedt that is in the borough of Hildesheim. The operator's concession is held by üstra Hannoversche Verkehrsbetriebe AG. The system currently consists of three full Stadtbahn route networks, respectively named (with their defining tunnels in brackets):

- A (Waterlooplatz – Lister Platz)
- B (Vahrenwald – Döhren)
- C (Königsworther Platz – Braunschweiger Platz)

A fourth tunnel, to be used for the D line (Goethestraße – Sallstraße), has been proposed but has not been realised so far due to the high costs of construction, currently estimated to be around €1 billion. Nevertheless, the above-ground parts of the D line, most notably the D Süd, connecting the Hanover fairground to the C tunnel, have been upgraded to proper Stadtbahn standards, some preparations for interchange with the current stations, such as an empty station below the current Hauptbahnhof station, have also been built in the past.

The entire Stadtbahn network uses various colours to differentiate between the main route networks. For example, a station that serves both A and B lines has a blue and a red stripe on its station sign; stop on the D line would feature a lime stripe on the station sign, and so on. This scheme sometimes also recurs in the architecture of the stations, for example Kröpcke station used to feature tiling that changed colour when changing between lines, i.e. yellow elements were introduced in the red tiles when walking from the B to the C part of the station.

Individual lines operate within the main route networks, diverting to various terminals at the city's edge. Currently, the Hanover Stadtbahn system consists of 12 main lines (lines 1–11 and 17), along with one weekend express night line (line 10E) and two supplementary lines (lines 16 and 18). The numbers are assigned to the lines as following (lines that only run during exhibitions on the Hanover fairground (i.e. supplementary lines) are denoted in italics):

- A network – Lines 3, 7, 13
- B network – Lines 1, 2, 8, 18
- C network – Lines 4, 5, 6, 11, 16
- D network – Lines 10, 17 and 10E* (*10E is a weekend express night service line, using parts of the A tunnel)

Whilst the number 6 and 16 services use a large part of the D line, they are still denoted as C services by using the colour yellow on station signage.

The main hub and transfer point of the network is Kröpcke, a large subterranean station in the city centre. Lines 1–9, 11, 16 and 18 all call at this station, making it possible to reach every point on the A, B or C route networks from every other point with only one change.

=== The D tunnel ===
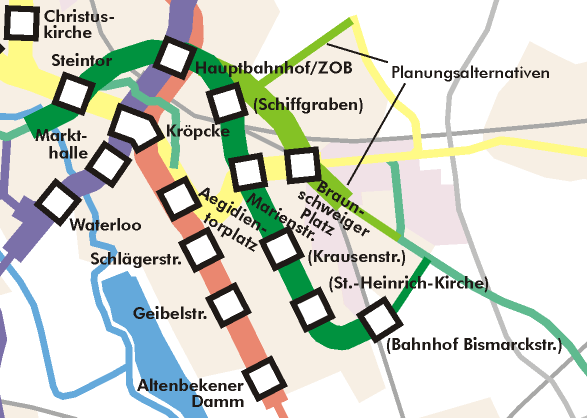
"D tunnel". Original plans under Sallstraße in dark green, alternative plans from 2000 in light green.

One major tunnel that was proposed as part of the 1965 plans is the D tunnel. As of 2024 this tunnel has not been built, nor is it likely to ever be built. The city centre tunnel for the D line was originally supposed to run from a ramp at Goethestraße via Steintor – Hauptbahnhof/ZOB – Berliner Allee – Sallstraße to Bahnhof Bismarckstraße, resurface on a ramp at Lindemannallee and continue to Bischofsholer Damm. Whilst some preparations have been made, most notably an empty station under today's Hauptbahnhof station and a special arrangement of pillars at stations Steintor and Marienstraße to allow a tunnel to be built underneath, the plans could not be realised, due to the high costs. It would however have been greatly beneficial to the D line, reducing stepover times to other lines. The current surface D line between Goetheplatz and Aegidientorplatz is regarded as a permanent solution for the mid-term future, although this statement could be argued against, for example when the wye at Steintor was demolished after the tearing down of tram tracks that had been replaced by the C-Nord line, the points were not removed but just welded shut. During the renovation of the Hauptbahnhof in 1999 and 2000, the tram tracks in front of the station were not replaced either.

üstra started undertaking major improvement works on the D line in 2017. This is called Projekt zehn-siebzehn (lit. 'Project ten-seventeen') and consists of renovating the existing surface line instead of building new tunnels.

=== Dead tunnels ===
Even though it is of a relatively young age, the Hanover Stadtbahn already has some buildings that are likely not to be used as intended. These are three tunnel stubs in the A and B tunnels.

Under both the ramps Hammersteinstraße (A-Nord) and Vahrenwalder Platz (B-Nord) the tunnel continues until the ramp's end since the original U-Bahn plans had proposed an extension of the tunnels. Whilst this made some theoretical sense at the A-Nord due to the relatively narrow Podbielskistraße, an extension of the tunnel is completely unneeded on the rather wide Vahrenwalder Straße. The stubs currently house some technical service rooms.

A notably larger structure exists behind the middle tracks of the station Waterloo. It was originally supposed to extend a tunnel toward the A-West (line 9 toward Empelde) and to construct a turning loop. However, this would require tearing down the current A-West ramp at Gustav-Bratke-Allee which would disconnect the Glocksee depot from the network. Thus, this will likely never be carried out.

== History ==
=== Stadtbahn lines opened ===
Line	from	to	Opening date
The lines to Laatzen/Süd and Rethen were built according to Stadtbahn standards but used as tramway lines until September, 1982.
B-Süd	Laatzen/Nord	Laatzen/Süd*	Sep 20 1973
A-Süd	Wallensteinstraße	Hauptbahnhof	Sep 26 1975
A-Nord	Hauptbahnhof	Buchholz: Paracelsusweg; Fasanenkrug	Apr 4 1976
B-Süd	Laatzen/Süd	Rethen/Nord*	Jun 18 1976
A-Süd	Wallensteinstraße	Mühlenberger Markt	Sep 25 1977
C-Ost	Nackenberg	Med.Hochschule/Süd	Oct 1 1978
A-West	Empelde	Schwarzer Bär	May 27, 1979
B-Nord	Hauptbahnhof	Vahrenwald: Langenhagen; Alte Heide	May 27, 1979
B	Hauptbahnhof	Kröpcke B	May 27, 1979
B-Süd	Kröpcke B	Schlägerstraße	May 31, 1981
B-Süd	Betriebshof Döhren		Sep 2 1982
B-Süd	Schlägerstraße	Döhren: Messegelände; Rethen; Laatzen – Sarstedt	Sep 26 1982
C	Aegidientorplatz	Kröpcke C	Sep 26 1982
C-West	Kröpcke C	Steintor	Mar 30 1983
C-Ost	Med.Hochschule/Süd	Roderbruch	Sep 29 1984
C-West	Steintor	Stöcken	Jun 2 1985
C-Ost	Aegidientorplatz	Kleefeld: Roderbruch; Ostfeldstraße	Sep 24 1989
	Freundallee		Sep 24 1989
B-Nord	Lgh./Berliner Platz	Langenhagen	Sep 29 1991
C-Nord	Steintor	(Nordstadt) – Haltenhoffstraße: Nordhafen	Sep 26 1993
C-Ost	Clausewitzstraße	Zoo	Sep 26 1993
D-West	Brunnenstraße	Ahlem	May 29, 1994
C-West	Hogrefestraße	Wissenschaftspark Marienwerder	Sep 24 1995
C-West	Wissenschaftspark Marienwerder	Garbsen	Sep 29 1996
C-West	Stadtfriedhof Stöcken	Betriebshof Fuhsestraße	Sep 26 1998
D-Süd	Freundallee	Kinderkrankenhaus auf der Built	Dec 5 1998
A-Süd	Waterloo	Allerweg (Legionsbrücke)	May 29, 1999
A-Süd	Mühlenberger Markt	Wettbergen	May 29, 1999
D-Süd	Kinderkrankenhaus auf der Built	Bünteweg/Tierärztliche Hochschule	May 30, 1999
D-Süd	Bünteweg/Ti.Ho.	Kronsberg	Oct 13 1999
D-Süd	Kronsberg	Messe/Ost	Feb 19 2000
C-Ost	Ostfeldstraße	Anderten	2002
A-Nord	Paracelsusweg	Altwarmbüchen	June 2006
A-Nord	Paracelsusweg	Misburg	Dec 14, 2014
D-Centre	closure hauptbahnhof(Rosenstrasse)	Aegidentorplatz	2017
D-Centre	Hauptbahnhof (Rosenstrasse)	Hauptbahnhof-ZOB	2017

== See also ==
- üstra
- intalliance AG
- TW 6000
- TW 2000
- TW 3000
- Stadtbahn
- List of rapid transit systems
