= Üstra =

Public transport company in Hannover, Germany

üstra Hannoversche Verkehrsbetriebe AG
- Company type: Aktiengesellschaft
- Industry: public transport
- Predecessors: Straßenbahn Hannover AG
- Founded: 1892
- Headquarters: Hanover, Germany
- Key people: André Neiß
- Products: transport
- Number of employees: 1886
- Website: Homepage
- Footnotes / references gauge 1,435 mm (4 ft 8 1/2 in)

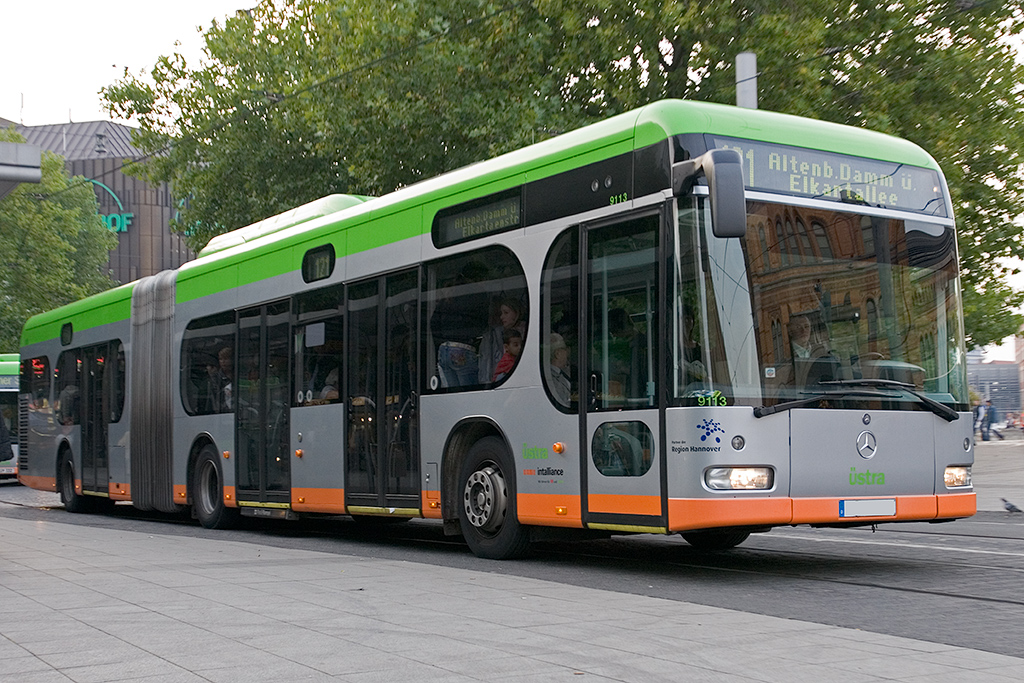
James Irvine-designed Mercedes-Benz Citaro bus

üstra Hannoversche Verkehrsbetriebe AG is the operator of public transport in the city of Hanover, Germany. The company is a member of the Großraum-Verkehr Hannover (GVH) transport association.

From 2003 to 2006, it had outsourced its operations, but officially resumed as a service provider on January 1, 2007.

== History ==
Üstra was originally the abbreviation for Überlandwerke und Straßenbahnen Hannover AG. The company also provided electricity to private customers as well as operating bus and tram services - not only in the city of Hannover but also to the outlying villages and small towns. This field was spun off in 1929 (becoming the HASTRA). In 1960, the company changed its name to Hannoversche Verkehrsbetriebe (ÜSTRA) AG, then to ÜSTRA Hannoversche Verkehrsbetriebe AG in 1980, changing the word üstra to lowercase in 1996.

The rural tram lines which were mostly singletrack brought coal (from Barsinghausen), milk and farm produce to the city but this business dwindled down with the motorisation in the 1950s and 1960s.

In 2001, ownership of the rail network, tunnels and stations of the Hanover Stadtbahn was transferred to Infrastrukturgesellschaft Region Hannover GmbH.

== Company structure ==
From 2004 to New Year's Eve 2006, the operative business was handled by intalliance AG. üstra had transferred more than 1900 employees to intalliance and acted as a holding company, having owned significant shares in intalliance AG, the TransTec holdings (providing technical services) and the protective service GmbH (the former security branch of üstra). Its shares in htp GmbH, a local telecommunications provider, were sold off in 2004.
