= Steintor (Hanover Stadtbahn station) =

Underground rail station in Hanover

Coordinates: 52.3758°N 9.7325°E

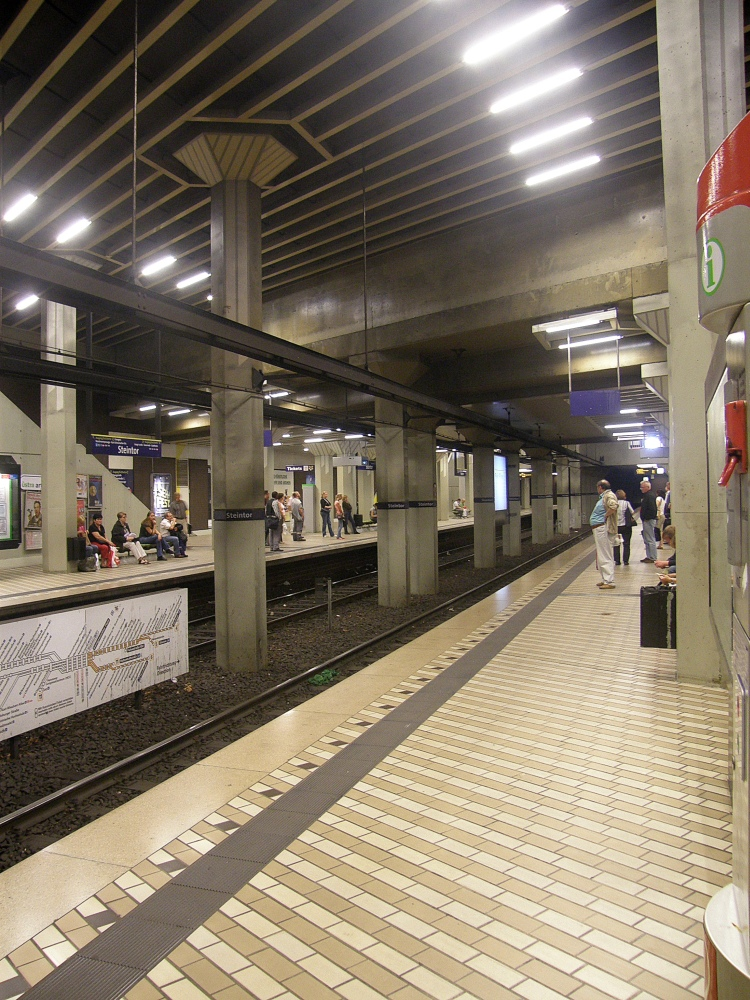
- Underground station

General information
- System: Hanover Stadtbahn station
- Operator: Üstra Hannoversche Verkehrsbetriebe AG
- Line: 4, 5, 6, 10, 11, 17
- Platforms: 6 side platforms (2 overground, 2 underground), of which 2 are for the never built D-Tunnel
- Tracks: 2, overground, 2 underground + 2 for the unbuilt D-Tunnel

Construction
- Structure type: Underground (4, 5, 6, 11)
- Platform levels: 3

Other information
- Fare zone: GVH: A
Location

Steintor is a Hanover Stadtbahn station served by all C and D lines. The C lines were built underground, which is the junction for all lines continuing west. Lines 4, 5 and 16 branch off eastwards towards the next station, Königsworther Platz (the latter one is the terminus at that station), while lines 6 and 11 branch off northbound, where the next station is Christuskirche.

== D-Tunnel ==
Beneath the current C line platforms there are additional D-Tunnel platforms which have never been built. Also these have 2 side platforms.

== Overground station ==
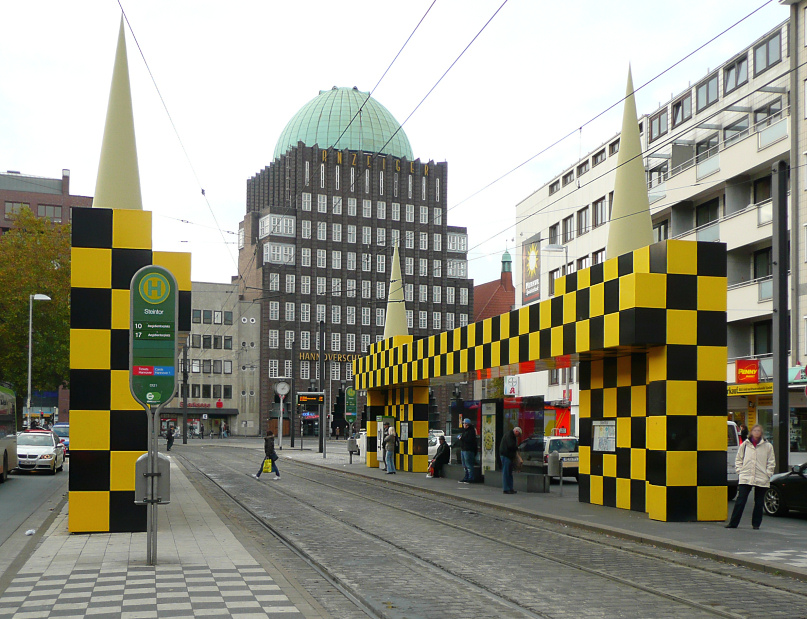
Overground station

The current overground station is home to D lines (10 and 17), and also these have 2 side platforms.

Towards	Next station	Steintor	Next station	Towards
Garbsen	Königsworther Platz	4	Kröpcke	Roderbruch
Stöcken	Königsworther Platz	5	Kröpcke	Anderten
Nordhafen	Christuskirche	6	Kröpcke	Messe/Ost
Ahlem	Clevertor	10	Hannover Hauptbahnhof	Aegidientorplatz
Haltenhoffstraße	Christuskirche	11	Kröpcke	Zoo
Königsworther Platz	Königsworther Platz	16 (during fairgrounds)	Kröpcke	Messe/Ost
Wallensteinstraße	Clevertor	17	Hannover Hauptbahnhof	Aegidientorplatz
