= Schlägerstraße (Hanover Stadtbahn station) =

German train station (Hanover)

Coordinates: 52.3650°N 9.7466°E

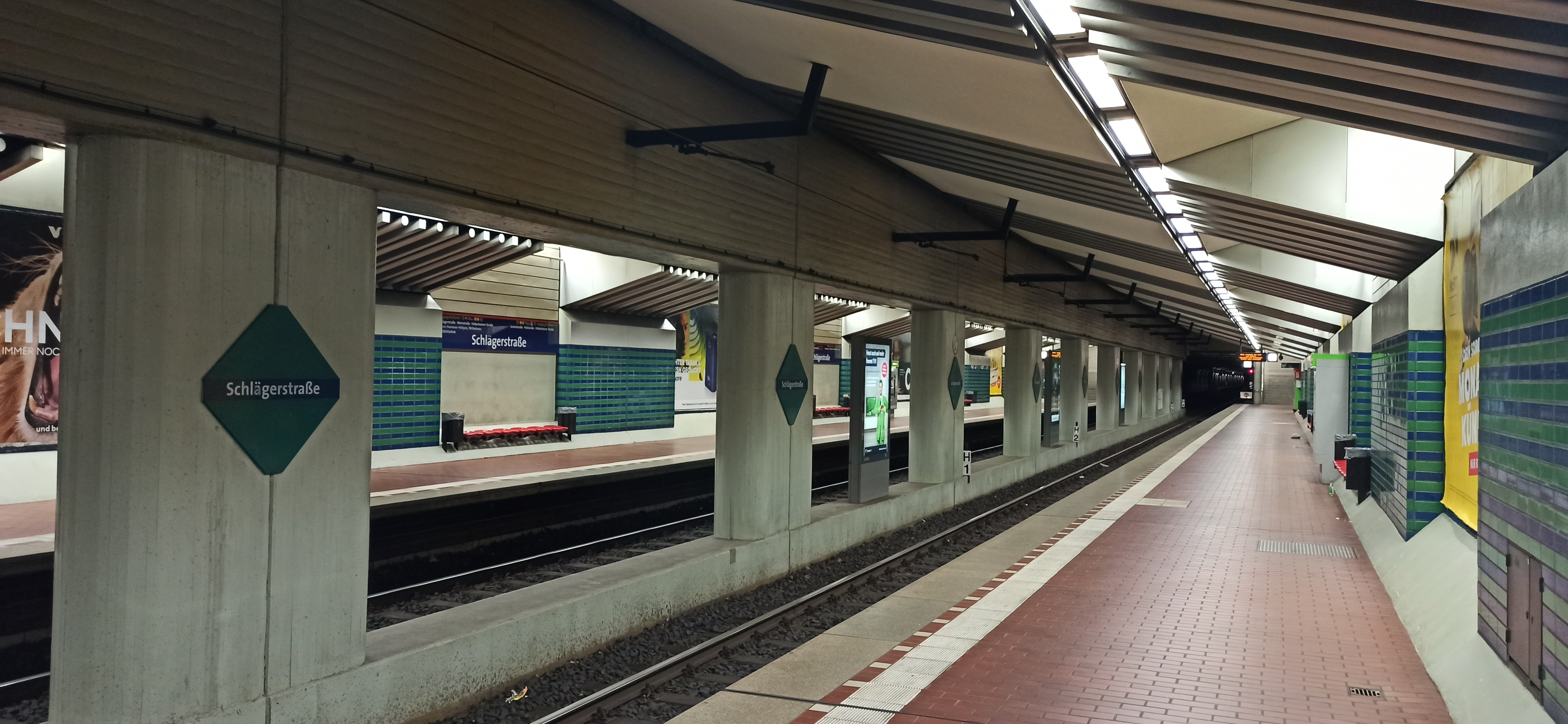

General information
- System: Hanover Stadtbahn station
- Operator: Üstra Hannoversche Verkehrsbetriebe AG
- Line: B
- Platforms: 2 side platforms
- Tracks: 2
- Connections: 1, 2, 8, 18

Construction
- Structure type: Underground station
- Platform levels: 2

Other information
- Fare zone: GVH: A
Location

Schlägerstraße is a station on the B tunnel (all lines) of the Hanover Stadtbahn. It is located inside the district of Hannover Südstadt.

Towards	Previous station	Schlägerstraße	Next station	Towards
Langenhagen	Aegidientorplatz	1	Geibelstraße	Sarstedt
Alte Heide	Aegidientorplatz	2	Geibelstraße	Döhren Bf. Rethen
Hannover Hauptbahnhof	Aegidientorplatz	8	Geibelstraße	Messe/Nord
Hannover Hauptbahnhof	Aegidientorplatz	18	Geibelstraße	Messe/Nord
