= Kröpcke =

Central city square in Hanover, Germany

- City square
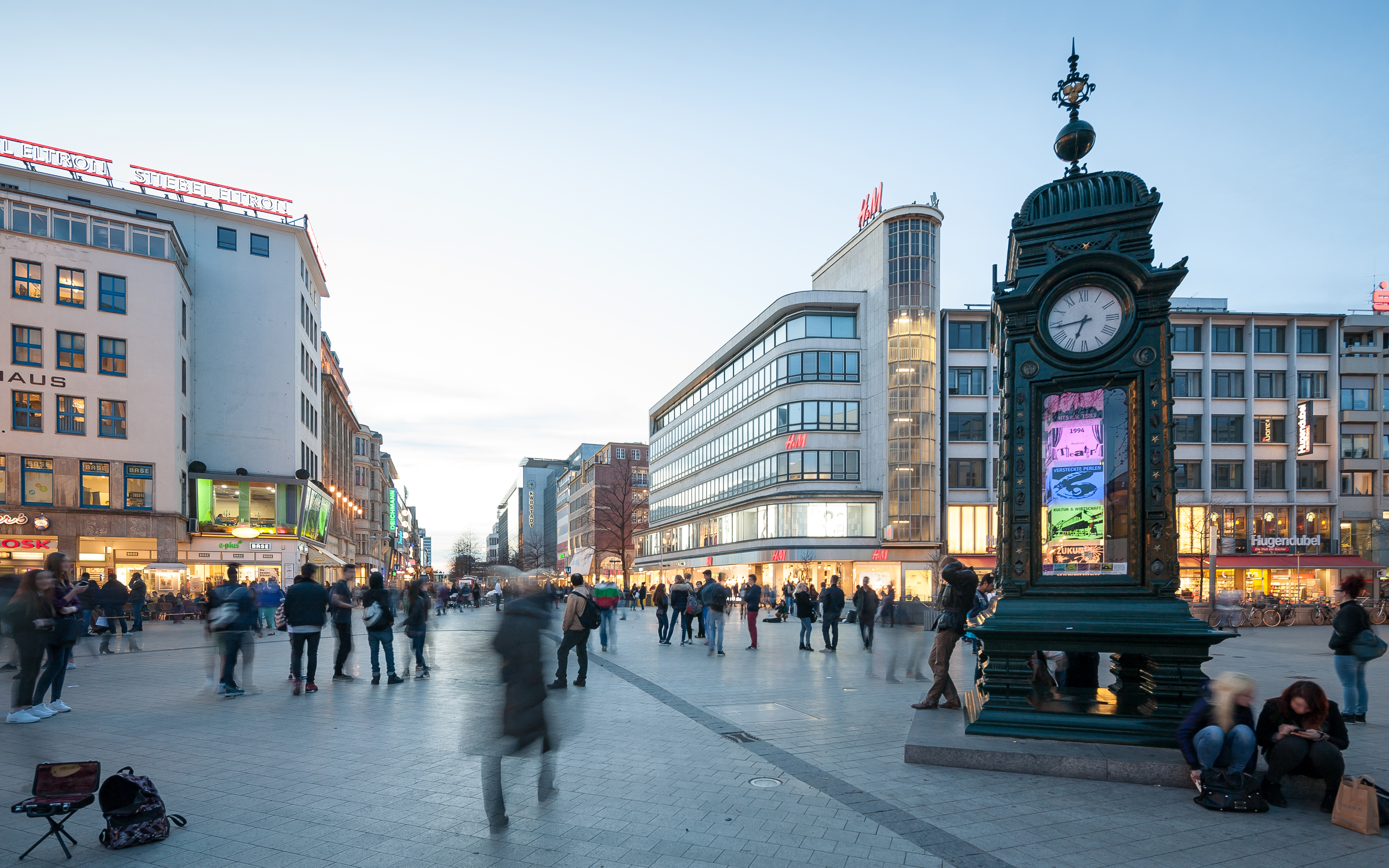
- Kröpcke seen from the east looking towards Stone Gate plaza, Kröpcke clock shown at the right
- Features: Kröpcke clock
- Opened: 1843; 183 years ago
- Location: Georgstraße, and Karmarschstraße, Bahnhofstraße and Rathenaustraße
- Address: Hanover; Lower Saxony, Germany
- Kröpcke and approximate locations of the former 13th-century defensive wall (●) and 17th-century inner bastion (●) that enclosed the old town
- Coordinates: 52°22′28″N 9°44′20″E

Kröpcke is the central square of the city of Hanover in Germany. The square is situated at the five-way crossroads of Georgstraße, and Karmarschstraße, Bahnhofstraße and Rathenaustraße. It is named after Wilhelm Kröpcke who started working at Café Robby, that had relocated to the then-nameless square in 1869, as a waiter in 1878, before leasing the café in 1885, changing its name to Café Kröpcke in 1895, and operating it until his death in 1919. Eventually, the square adopted the name from the café and in 1947 was officially named Kröpcke by the city of Hanover.

One of its most notable features is the Kröpcke clock, a 1977 reconstruction of a meteorological column erected in 1885 in front of the then Café Robby. This column was damaged by an air raid in 1943, but its clock was repaired in 1945 after the end of World War II in Europe. In 1954, the meteorological column was removed and replaced the following year with a contemporary clock. This in turn was replaced in 1977 with a simplified reconstruction of the historical meteorological column that features a clock and, instead of meteorological instruments, a display case for art exhibitions and presentations.

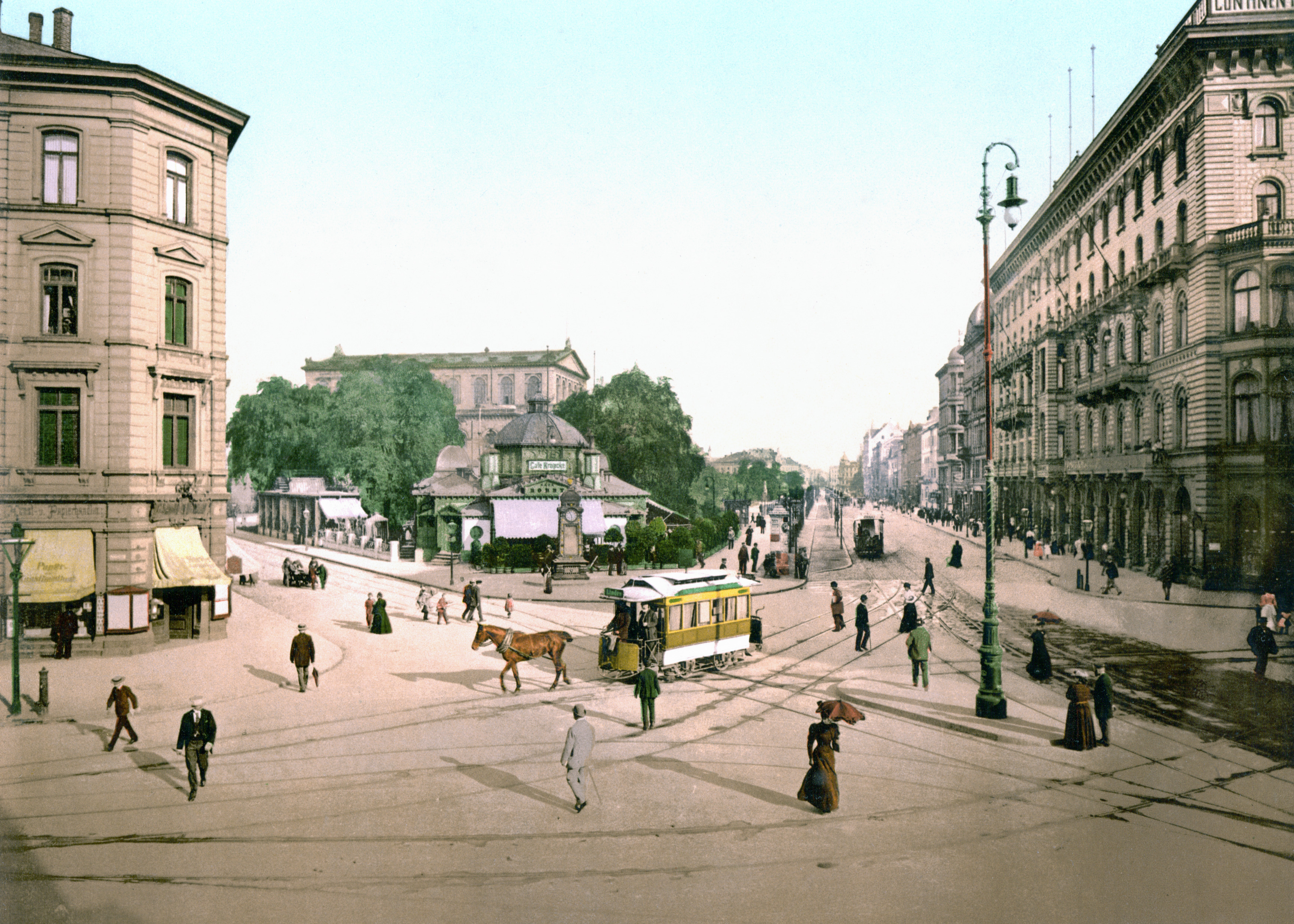
Looking south-southeast down Georgstraße between 1890 and 1905 across what is known today as Kröpcke square

== Stadtbahn station ==
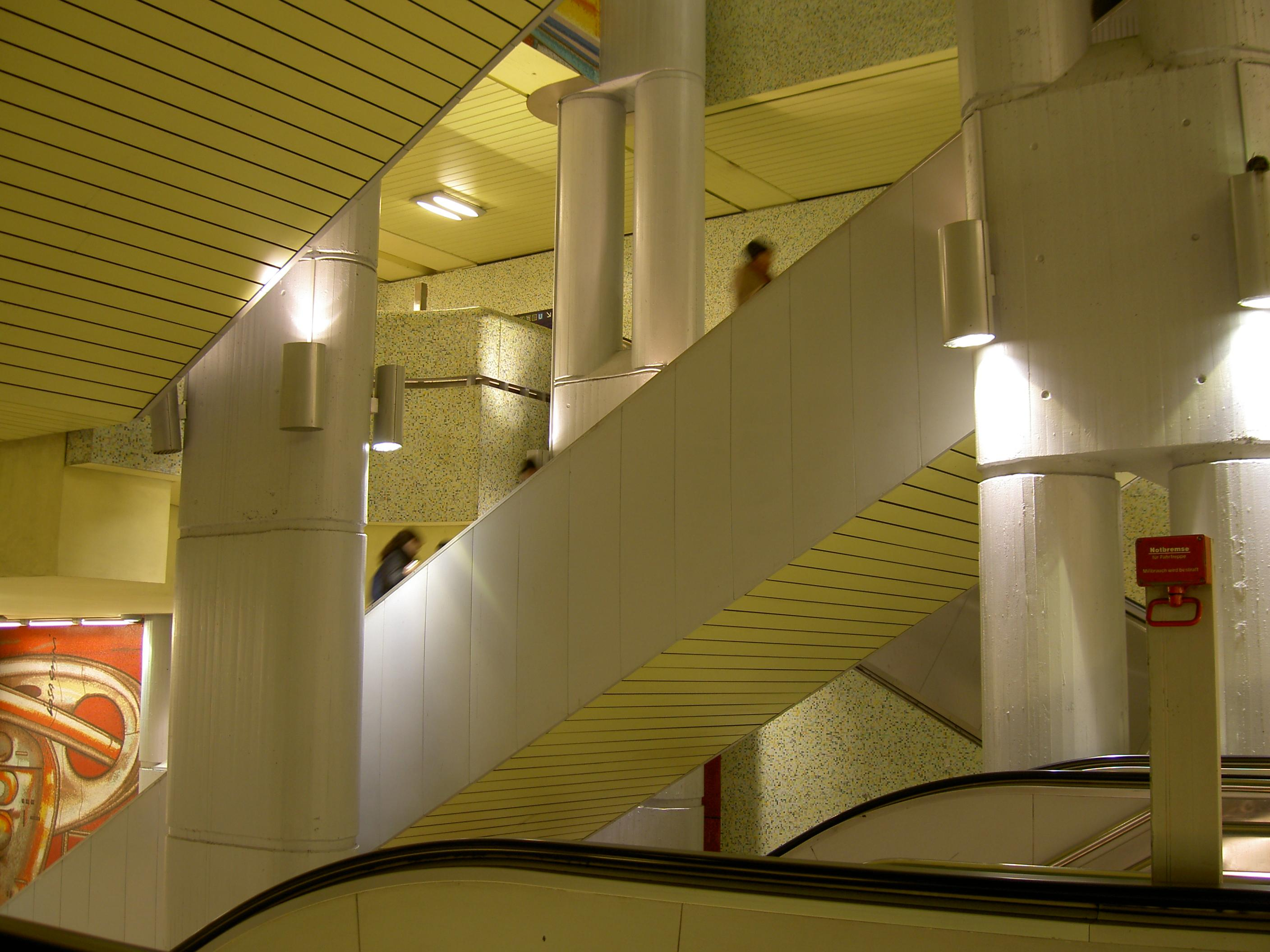
Escalators in the station

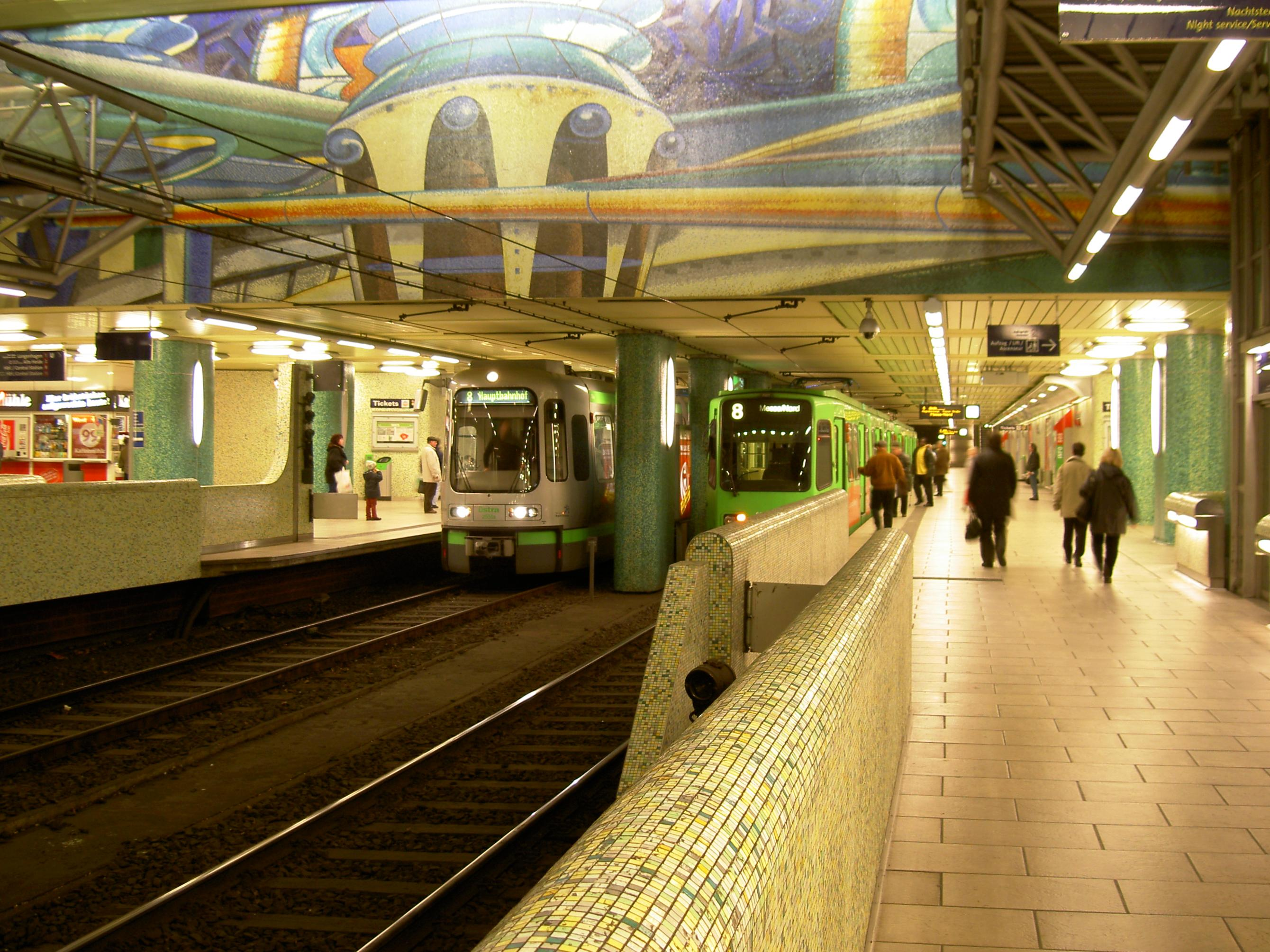
Tunnel of the B line

The Kröpcke station is the main station in the Hanover Stadtbahn network. It was built from 1968 to 1974 and opened in several parts through the 1970s and 1980s. At the time, it was one of Hanover's largest construction sites, extending more than 30 metres (98 ft) underground. Today, all Stadtbahn lines except two call at the station and it is the main interchange point for the network. It has six platforms in total on three lines that cross each other in independent tunnels.

Level -1 Main entrance and access to Niki-de-Saint-Phalle-Promenade.

Level -2

- A line toward Hauptbahnhof and Markthalle.
- B line toward Hauptbahnhof and Aegidientorplatz.
- Connection between A line to Markthalle and B line to Aegidientorplatz

Level -2.5 Connecting level with escalators and staircases to the A, B and C lines.

Level -3

- C line toward Steintor and Aegidientorplatz.

The station underwent extensive modernisation prior to Expo 2000, including hiding its 1970s colours tilework behind large murals.

=== Next stations ===
Towards	Previous station	Kröpcke	Next station	Towards
Langenhagen	Hauptbahnof	1	Aegidientorplatz	Sarstedt
Alte Heide	Hauptbahnof	2	Aegidientorplatz	Rethen; Bf. Döhren
Atwärmbuchen	Hauptbahnof	3	Markthalle/Landtag	Wettbergen
Garbsen	Steintor	4	Aegidientorplatz	Roderbruch
Stöcken	Steintor	5	Aegidientorplatz	Anderten
Nordhafen	Steintor	6	Aegidientorplatz	Messe/Ost
Schierholzstraße	Hauptbahnof	7	Markthalle/Landtag	Wettbergen
Hauptbahnof	Hauptbahnof	8	Aegidientorplatz	Messe/Nord
Fasanenkrug	Hauptbahnof	9	Markthalle/Landtag	Empelde
Haltenhoffstraße	Steintor	11	Aegidientorplatz	Zoo
Königsworther Platz	Steintor	16 (during fairgrounds)	Aegidientorplatz	Messe/Ost
Hauptbahnof	Hauptbahnof	18 (during fairgrounds)	Aegidientorplatz	Messe/Nord
