= Thielenplatz/Schauspielhaus (Hanover Stadtbahn station) =

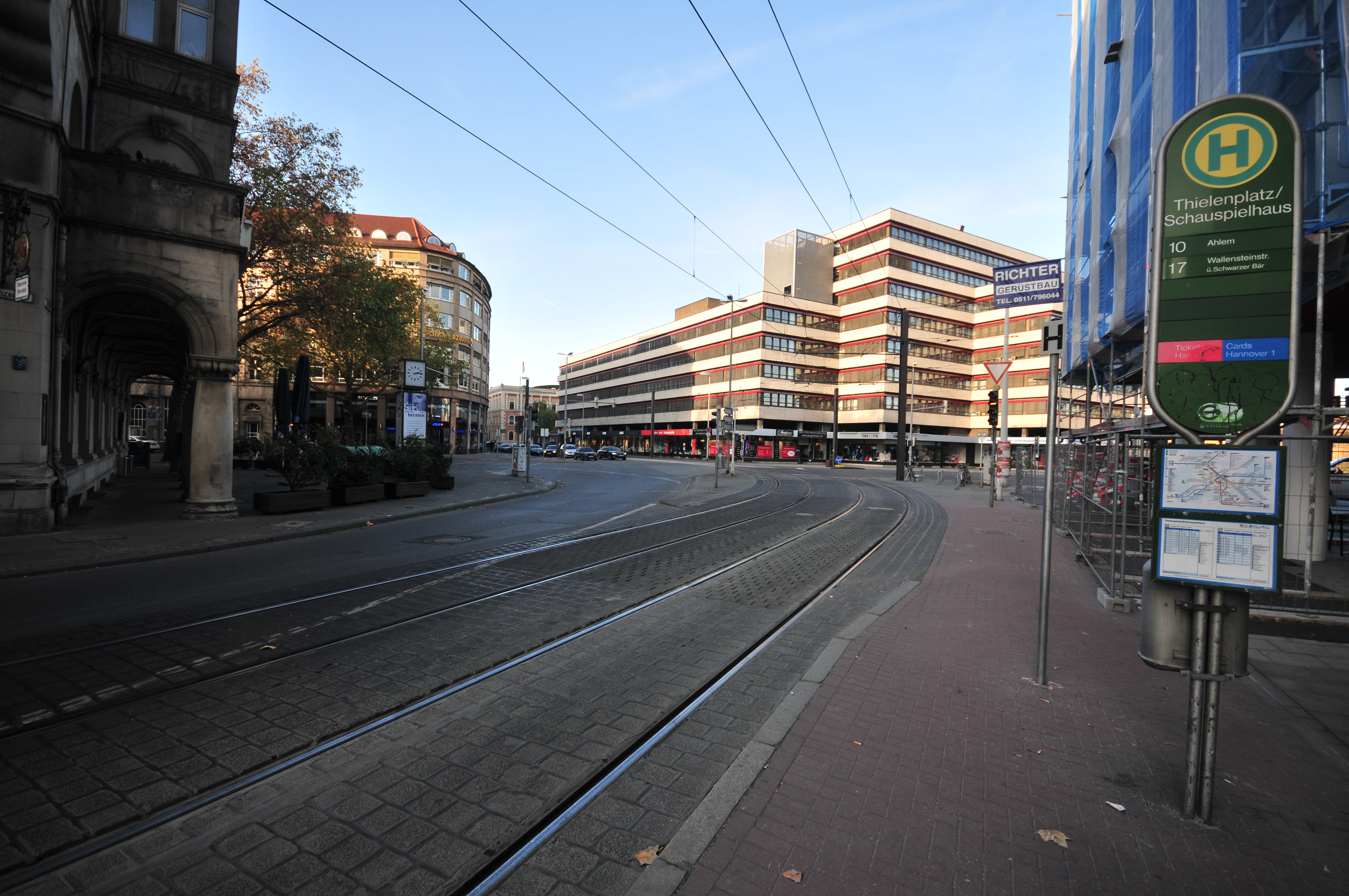

General information
- System: Hanover Stadtbahn station
- Line: 10, 17
- Platforms: 2

Construction
- Structure type: Tram stop
Location

Thielenplatz/Schauspielhaus is a Hanover Stadtbahn station served by lines 10 and 17.

Towards	Previous station	Line	Next station	Towards
Ahlem	Hannover Hauptbahnhof	10	Aegidientorplatz	Aegidientorplatz
Wallensteinstraße	Hannover Hauptbahnhof	17	Aegidientorplatz	Aegidientorplatz
