= Markthalle/Landtag (Hanover Stadtbahn station) =

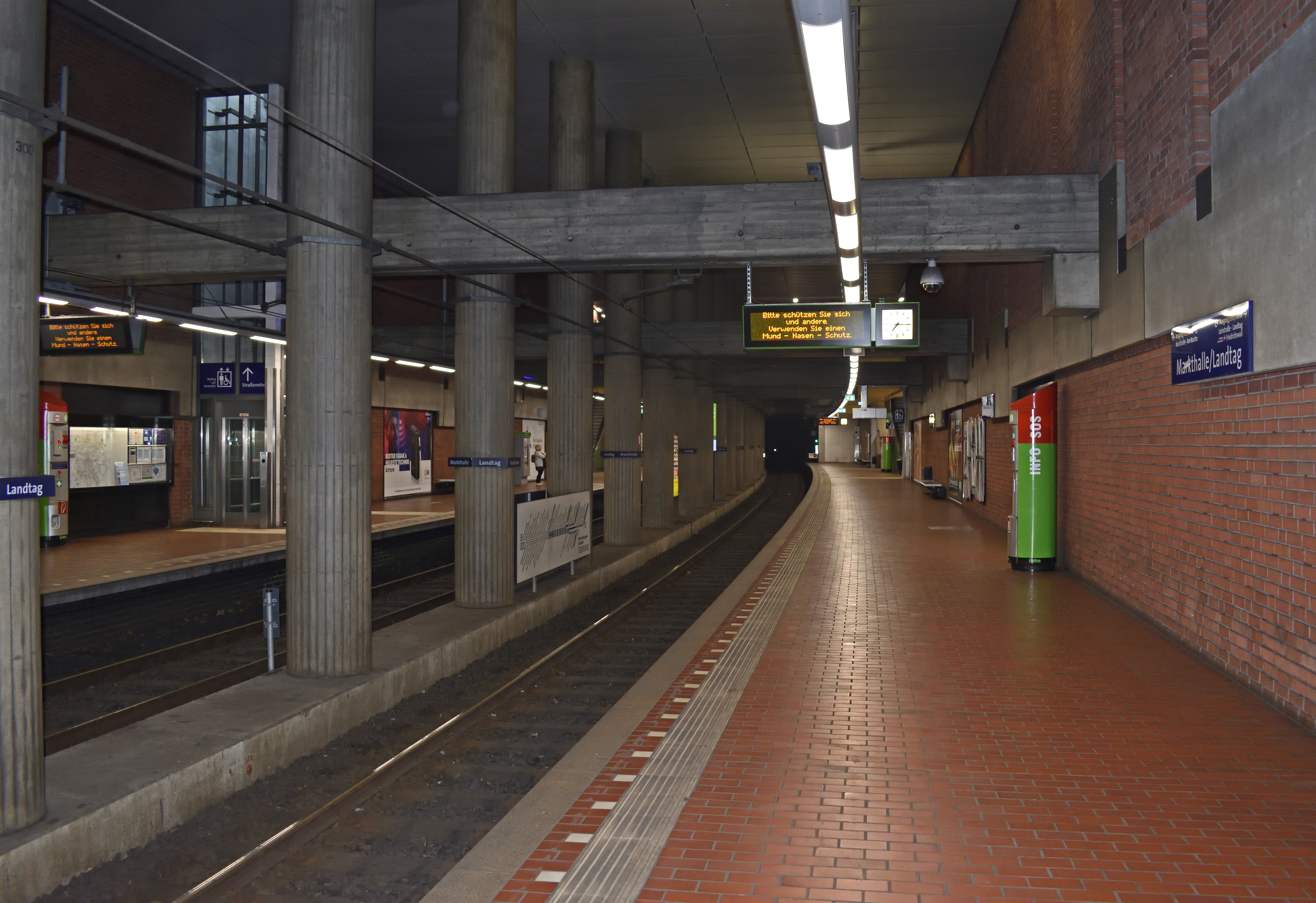

General information
- Location: Hanover; Germany
- Coordinates: 52°22′14″N 9°44′10″E
- System: Hanover Stadtbahn station
- Operator: üstra
- Lines: A-Tunnel: Lines 3, 7 & 9
- Platforms: 2 side platforms
- Tracks: 2

Construction
- Structure type: Underground station

Other information
- Fare zone: GVH: A
Location

Markthalle/Landtag is an underground station on the Hanover Stadtbahn, served by the A lines.

This station consists of a mezzanine level and two side platforms.

Towards	Previous station	Line	Next station	Towards
Wettbergen	Waterloo	3	Kröpcke	Altwarmbüchen
Wettbergen	Waterloo	7	Kröpcke	Schierholzstraße
Empelde	Waterloo	9	Kröpcke	Fasanenkrug
