= Hannover-Kleefeld station =

Railway station in Hanover, Germany

Coordinates: 52°22′24″N 9°47′28″E

Hannover Kleefeld
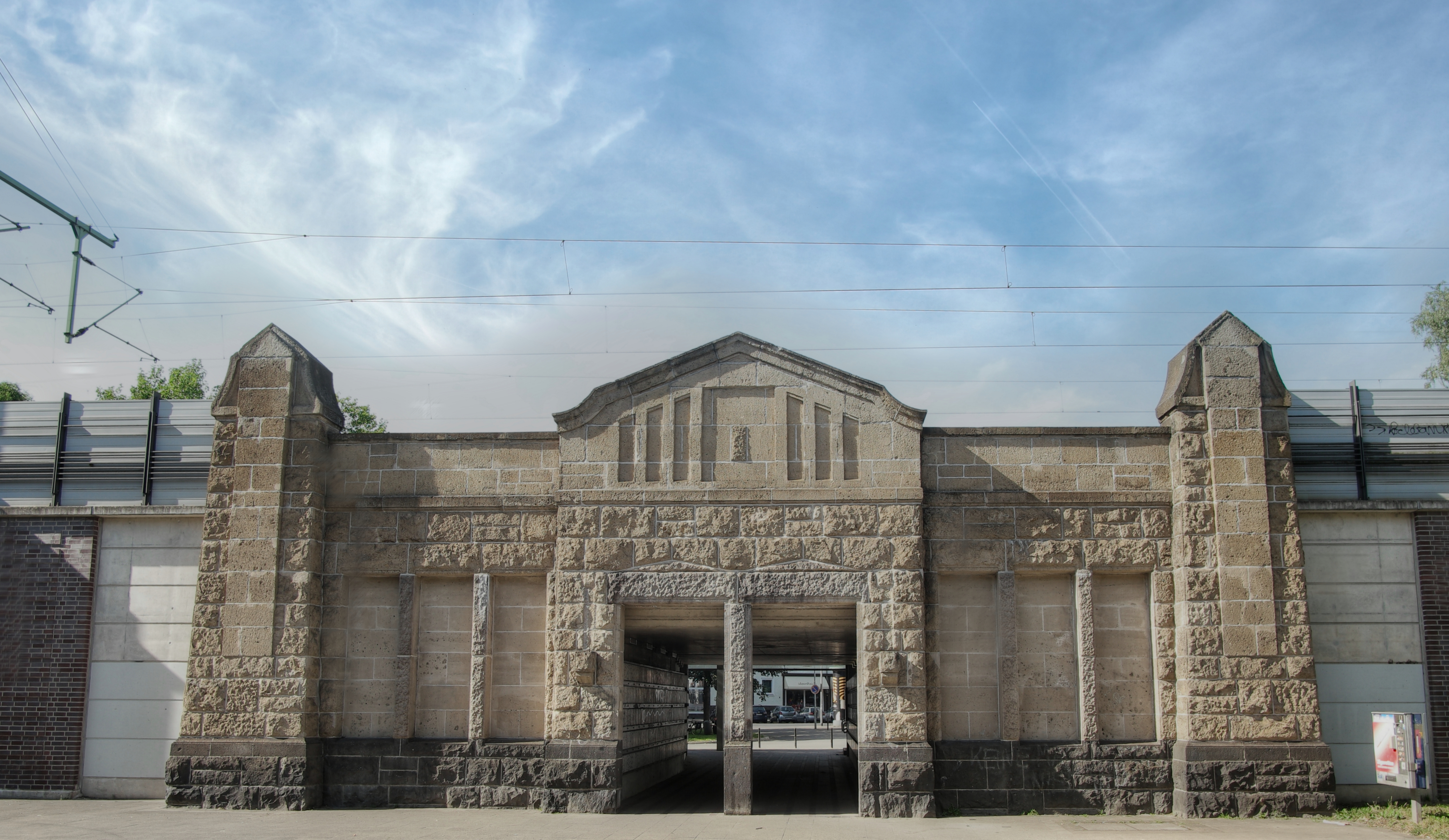
- 2015

General information
- Location: Berckhusenstraße 8; 30625 Hannover; Lower Saxony; Germany
- Owner: DB Netz
- Operator: DB Station&Service
- Lines: Hanover–Brunswick railway (KBS 310)
- Platforms: 1 side platform
- Tracks: 3
- Train operators: S-Bahn Hannover

Other information
- Station code: 2549
- DS100 code: HKL
- IBNR: 8002584
- Category: 5
- Fare zone: GVH: A
- Website: www.bahnhof.de

Services
Preceding station	Hanover S-Bahn	Following station
Hannover Hbf Terminus	S 3	Karl-Wiechert-Allee towards Hildesheim Hbf
Hannover Hbf Terminus	S 7	Karl-Wiechert-Allee towards Celle
Location
- Location within Lower Saxony

Hannover-Kleefeld is a railway station located in Kleefeld (de), Hannover, Germany. The station is located on the Hanover–Brunswick railway.

== Overview ==
The station has one side platform, which is partly covered. The platform can be reached by stairs and an elevator from a small square on the north side of the tracks. This square is used to drop people off and connects to Berckhusenstraße, where the station's bus stop is. Uhlhornstraße, on the south side of the tracks, is also accessible from the station via a pedestrian tunnel. Around the station there are a couple of bicycle sheds.

== Train services ==
The train services are operated by Deutsche Bahn as part of the Hanover S-Bahn. Hannover-Kleefeld is served by the S3 and S7.
