= Waterloo (Hanover Stadtbahn station) =

Underground rail station in Hanover

Coordinates: 52.3672°N 9.7286°E

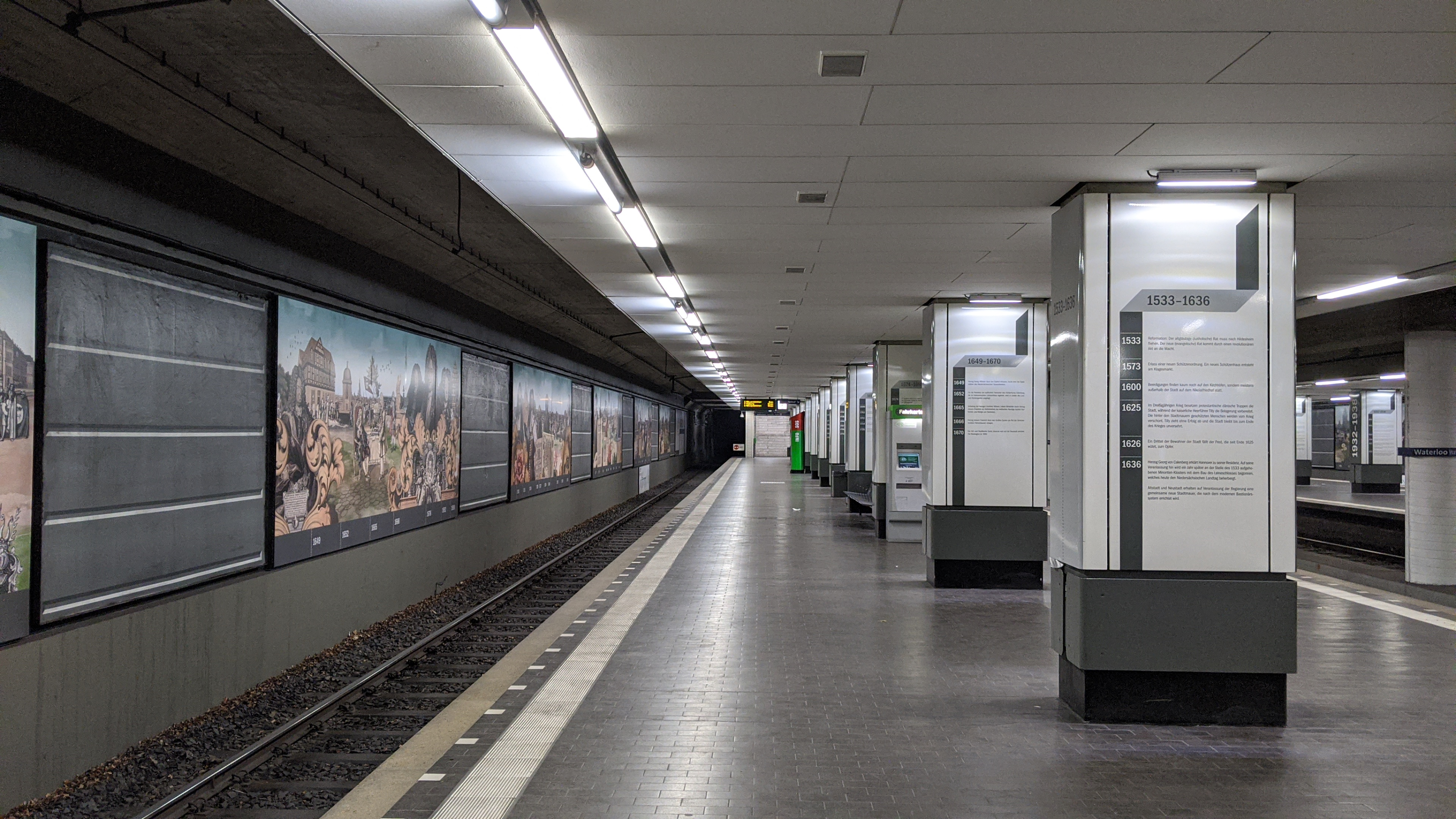

General information
- System: Hanover Stadtbahn station
- Operator: Üstra Hannoversche Verkehrsbetriebe AG
- Line: 3, 7, 9
- Platforms: 2 island platforms
- Tracks: 4

Construction
- Structure type: Underground
- Platform levels: 2

Other information
- Fare zone: GVH: A
Location

Waterloo is a Hanover Stadtbahn station served by lines 3, 7 and 9, situated below Waterloo Plaza that surrounds the Waterloo Column, all named after the Battle of Waterloo. At its south, the lines branch off; lines 3 and 7 turn south in order to travel towards Wallensteinstraße and Wettbergen, while line 9 keeps west towards the centre of Hannover-Linden in order to reach Empelde.

The station has four tracks to prevent simultaneously arriving trains from Empelde and Wettbergen from having to wait in the tunnel. It was opened as the first underground Stadtbahn station in Hanover, and was renovated in 2014. The walls and columns now display images and information about the history of Hanover.

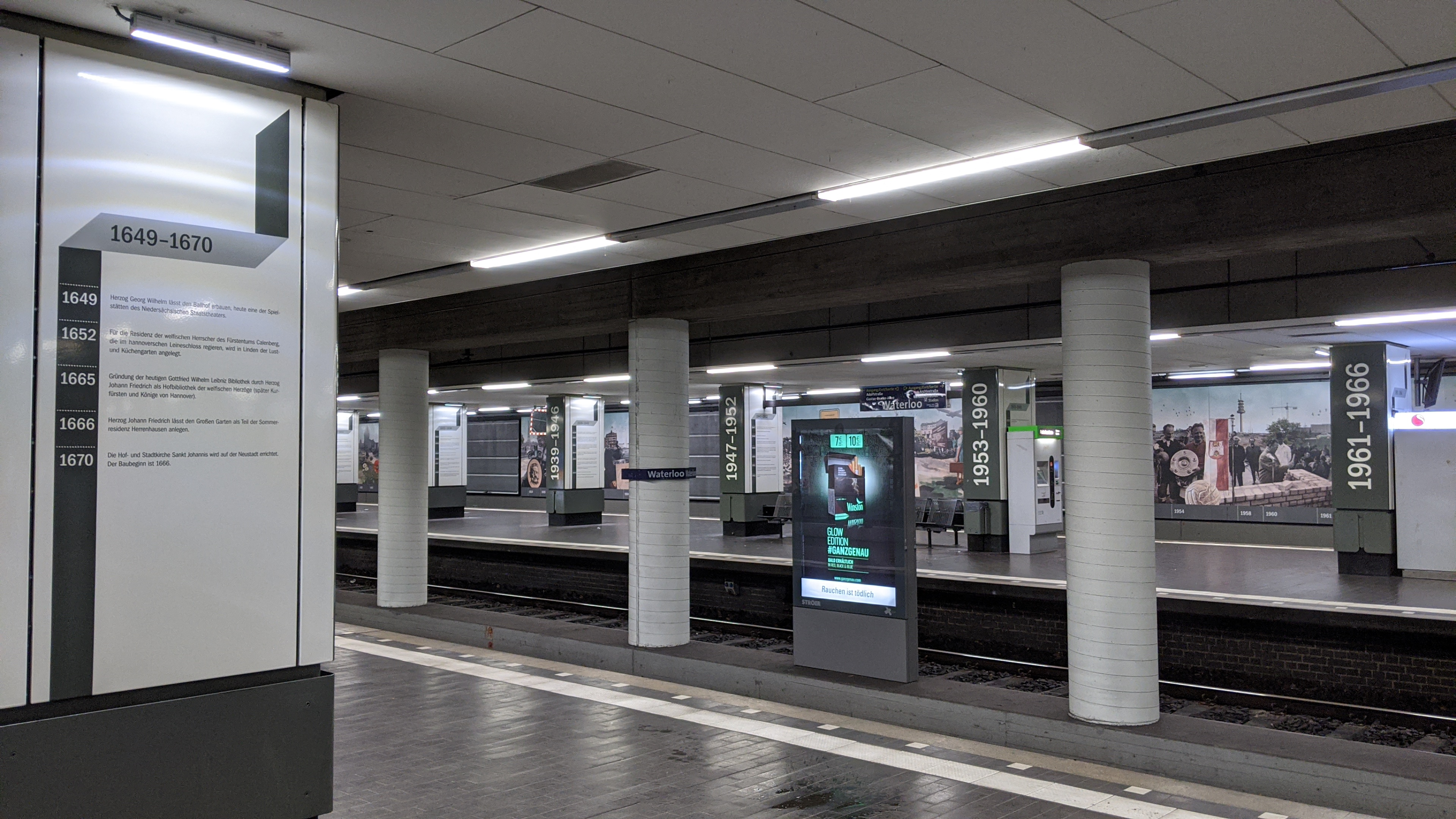
Inside Waterloo station in June 2020

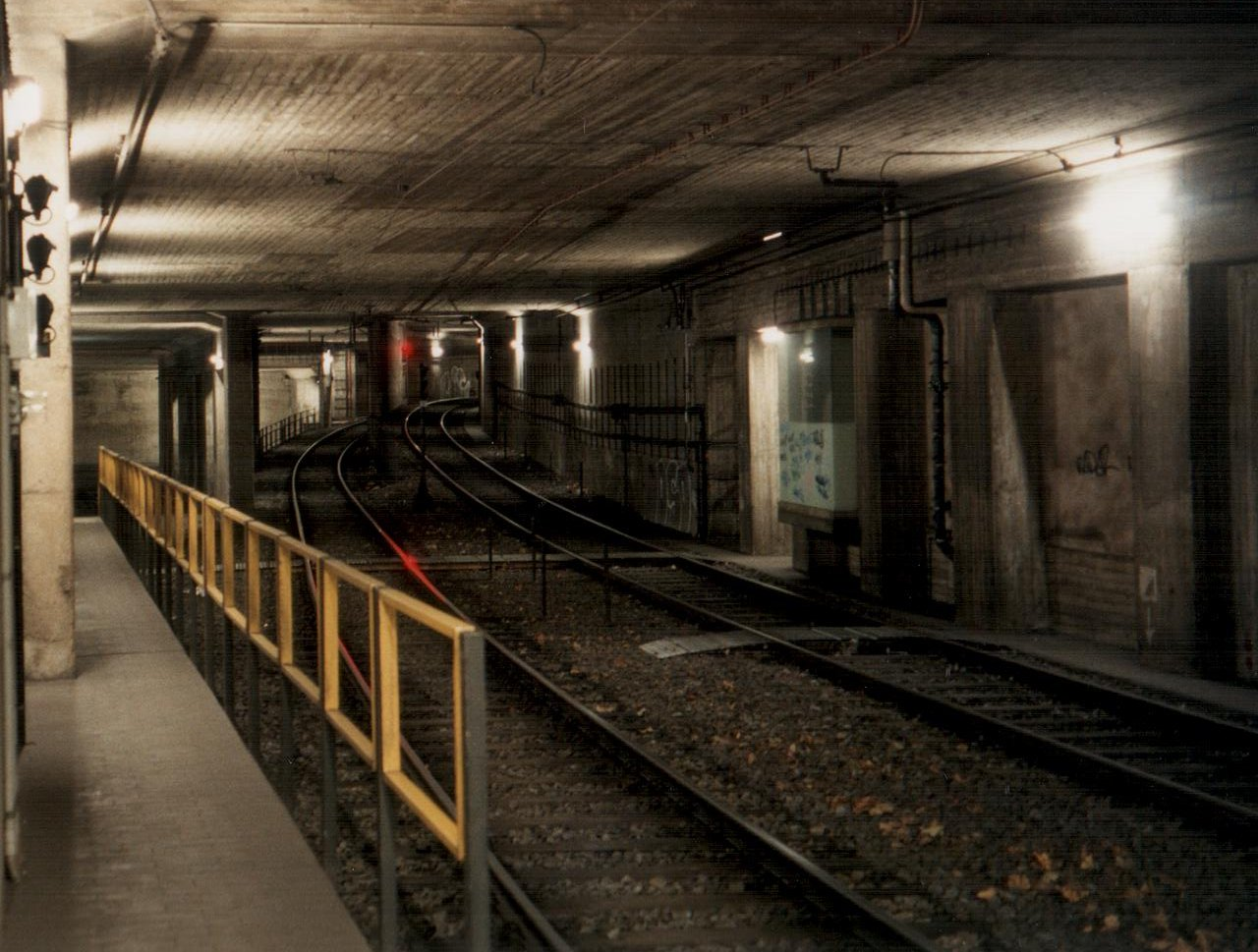
Southern tunnel junction

== Next stations ==
Towards	Next station	Waterloo	Next station	Towards
Wettbergen	Allerweg	3	Markthalle/Landtag	Altwarmbüchen
Wettbergen	Allerweg	7	Markthalle/Landtag	Misburg
Empelde	Schwarzer Bär	9	Markthalle/Landtag	Fasanenkrug
