= Hannover Hauptbahnhof =

Main railway station of Hanover, Germany

Hannover Hbf
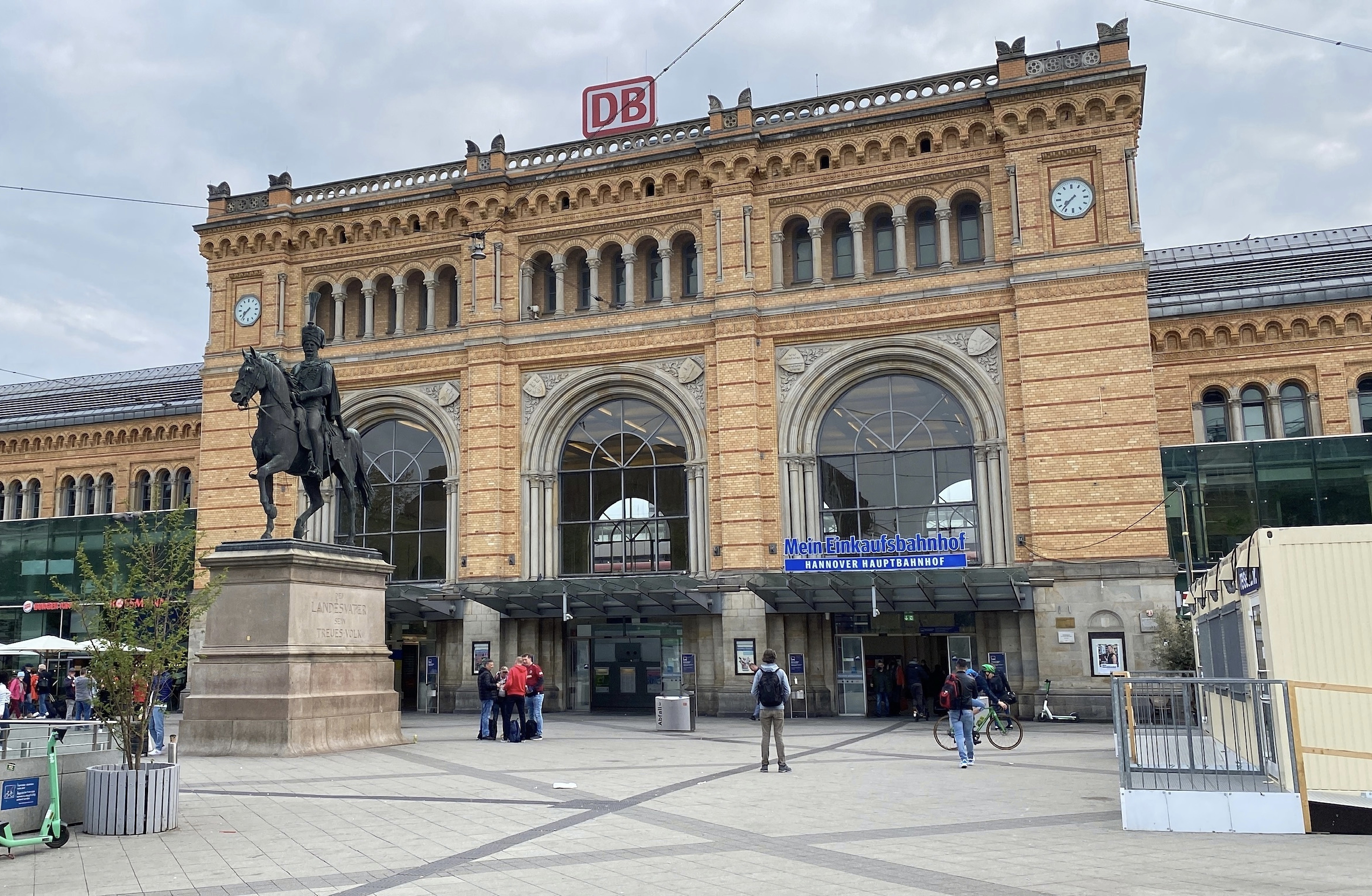
- Hannover Hauptbahnhof on Ernst-August-Platz

General information
- Location: Hannover, Lower Saxony; Germany
- Coordinates: 52°22′38″N 9°44′30″E
- Owner: Deutsche Bahn
- Operator: DB InfraGO
- Lines: Hanover–Hamburg (KBS 110); Hanover–Wolfsburg (KBS 300); Hanover–Berlin HSL (KBS 301); Hanover–Braunschweig (KBS 310); Hanoverian Southern Railway (KBS 350); Hanover–Würzburg high-speed line (KBS 351); Hanover–Minden (KBS 370); Hanover–Bremen (KBS 380)
- Platforms: 12

Construction
- Accessible: Yes
- Architect: Hubert Stier

Other information
- Station code: 2545
- DS100 code: HH
- Category: 1
- Fare zone: GVH: A
- Website: www.bahnhof.de

History
- Opened: 1843 (first station); 1879 (current station building)

Passengers
- 250,000 daily
Services
| Preceding station | DB Fernverkehr | Following station |
|---|---|---|
| Hamburg Hbf towards Padborg | ICE 4 Sprinter | Frankfurt (Main) Hbf towards Frankfurt Airport Regional |
| Minden (Westfalen) towards Köln Hbf | ICE 10 | Braunschweig Hbf towards Berlin Ostbahnhof |
| Minden (Westfalen) towards Köln Hbf | ICE 10 | Wolfsburg Hbf towards Berlin Ostbahnhof |
| Reverses direction | ICE 12 | Wolfsburg Hbf towards Berlin Ostbahnhof |
| Reverses direction | ICE 12 | Göttingen towards Zürich HB |
| Herford towards Aachen Hbf | ICE 14 | Wolfsburg Hbf towards Berlin Ostbahnhof |
| Osnabrück Hbf towards Aachen Hbf | ICE 14 | Wolfsburg Hbf towards Berlin Ostbahnhof |
| Bremen Hbf towards Oldenburg Hbf | ICE 16 | Berlin-Spandau towards Berlin Südkreuz |
| Bielefeld Hbf towards Koblenz Hbf | ICE 19 | Wolfsburg Hbf towards Berlin Ostbahnhof |
| Lüneburg towards Hamburg Hbf | ICE/ECE 20 | Göttingen towards Basel SBB |
| Celle towards Hamburg Hbf or Kiel Hbf | ICE 22 | Göttingen towards Stuttgart Hbf |
| Lüneburg towards Hamburg-Altona | ICE 24 | Göttingen towards Innsbruck Hbf or Schwarzach-St.Veit |
| Lüneburg towards Westerland (Sylt) | ICE 24 | Göttingen towards Frankfurt (Main) Hbf |
| Lüneburg towards Rostock Hbf | ICE 25 | Göttingen towards München Hbf |
| Bremen Hbf Terminus | ICE 26 | Göttingen towards Karlsruhe Hbf |
| Minden towards Stuttgart Hbf | IC 55 | Braunschweig Hbf towards Dresden Hbf |
| Nienburg towards Norddeich Mole | IC 56 | Braunschweig Hbf towards Leipzig Hbf |
| Bünde towards Amsterdam Centraal | ICE 77 | Berlin-Spandau towards Berlin Ostbahnhof |
| Hamburg-Harburg towards Hamburg-Altona | ICE 91 | Göttingen towards Wien Hbf |
| Preceding station | ÖBB | Following station |
| Hamburg-Harburg towards Hamburg-Altona | Nightjet | Göttingen towards Innsbruck Hbf or Wien Hbf |
| Preceding station | | Following station |
| Bielefeld Hbf towards Aachen Hbf | FLX 30 | Berlin-Spandau towards Leipzig Hbf |
| Preceding station | DB Regio Nord | Following station |
| Wunstorf towards Norddeich Mole | RE 1 | Terminus |
| Wunstorf towards Bremerhaven-Lehe | RE 8 | Terminus |
| Preceding station | Metronom | Following station |
| Langenhagen Mitte towards Uelzen | RE 2 | Sarstedt towards Göttingen |
| Langenhagen Mitte towards Hamburg Hbf | RE 3 | Terminus |
| Terminus | RE 30 | Lehrte towards Wolfsburg Hbf |
| Preceding station | | Following station |
| Terminus | RE 10 | Sarstedt towards Bad Harzburg |
| Preceding station | Start | Following station |
| Langenhagen Mitte towards Buchholz (Nordheide) | RB 38 | Terminus |
| Preceding station | | Following station |
| Wunstorf towards Rheine | RE 60 | Lehrte towards Braunschweig Hbf |
| Wunstorf towards Bielefeld Hbf | RE 70 | Lehrte towards Braunschweig Hbf |
| Preceding station | Hanover S-Bahn | Following station |
| Nordstadt towards Minden (Westfalen) | S 1 | Bismarckstraße towards Haste (Han) |
| Nordstadt towards Nienburg (Weser) | S 2 | Bismarckstraße towards Haste (Han) |
| Terminus | S 3 | Kleefeld towards Hildesheim Hbf |
| Nordstadt towards Bennemühlen | S 4 | Bismarckstraße towards Hildesheim Hbf |
| Nordstadt towards Flughafen | S 5 | Bismarckstraße towards Paderborn Hbf |
| Terminus | S 6 | Karl-Wiechert-Allee towards Celle |
| Terminus | S 7 | Kleefeld towards Celle |
| Nordstadt towards Flughafen | S 8 | Bismarckstraße towards Messe/Laatzen |
| Terminus | S 21 | Bismarckstraße towards Barsinghausen |
| Letter towards Hameln | S 51 Minden | Bismarckstraße towards Seelze |
Location

Hannover Hauptbahnhof (German for 'Hanover central station') is the main railway station for the city of Hanover in Lower Saxony, Germany. The railway junction is one of the 21 stations listed as a railway Category 1 station by DB InfraGO. It is also the most important public transport hub of the region of Hanover and it is served regional and S-Bahn services. The station has six platforms with twelve platform tracks, and two through tracks without platforms. Every day it is used by 250,000 passengers and 622 trains stop at the platforms (as of October 2012). About 2,000 people work here.

== History ==
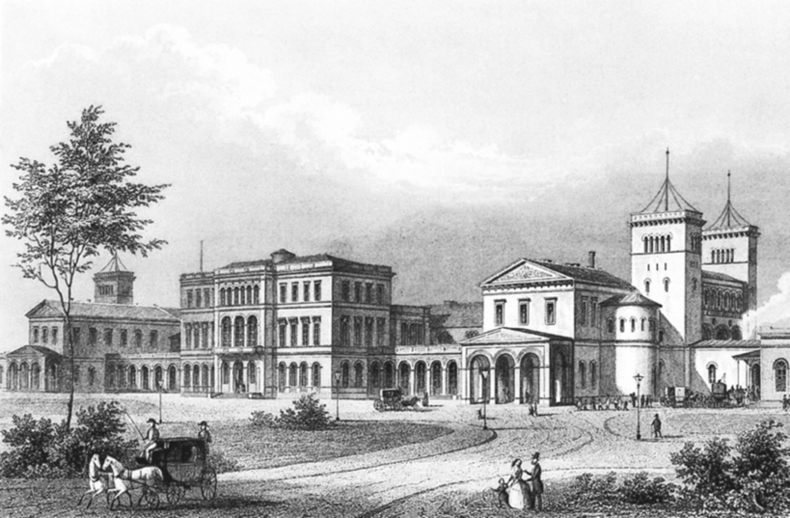
Central station in about 1850 (steel engraving)

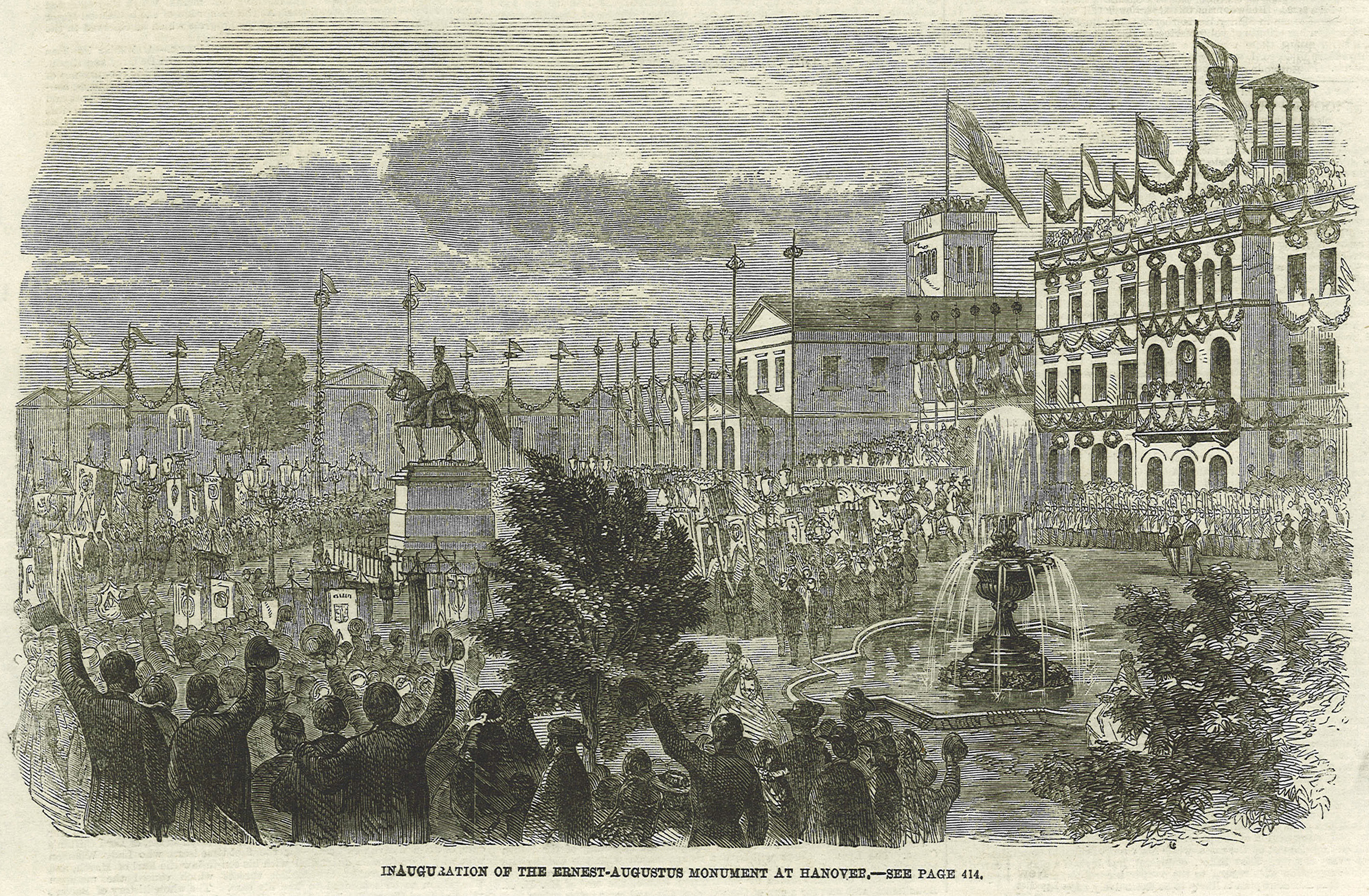
1861: The second building during the inauguration of the Ernest August Monument; virtual cutting of a donation of a full page of The Illustrated London News

The first station on the current site, a temporary building that served the line to Lehrte, was erected in 1843. Instead of building a monumental terminus, a through station was built along with the line, making it the first through station in a major German city.

The first central station (Central-Bahnhof) was built from 1845 to 1847. Its architect is not certain, but it is sure that the far-sighted city architect August Heinrich Andreae was involved in selecting its specific location and that the Hanoverian court architect Georg Ludwig Friedrich Laves and Ferdinand Schwarz contributed to it. It was built in a romantic-neoclassical style as a strictly symmetrical building. The massive masonry was covered in yellow plaster. Laves planned a new district, the Ernst-August-Stadt, for the area between Georgstraße and the railway. Roads led from several directions and converged on the station forecourt, the Ernst-August-Platz.

A wooden platform area was built next to the entrance building and on each side of the two tracks. That was enough for the first traffic because the still short trains running to the east and the west stopped at the same platform. There were no through trains initially. The first through train ran from 1 May 1851 between Berlin and Cologne. The first railway workshop was built opposite the station building. In 1853, the opening of the first section of the Southern Railway to Alfeld, Göttingen and Kassel made the through station into a railway junction. A marshalling yard was established in Hainholz to relieve the station in 1868.

The increasingly dense traffic on the railway created a problem since the railway line cut through the city. It was decided in 1873 to raise the railway line through the urban area by a height of 4.5 m (15 ft). The old station building was demolished in 1875. The route built between 1875 and 1879 became the model for the Berlin Stadtbahn and similar projects in other German cities. In 1876, a yard for general freight was established at Weidendamm.

=== Second Station of 1879 ===
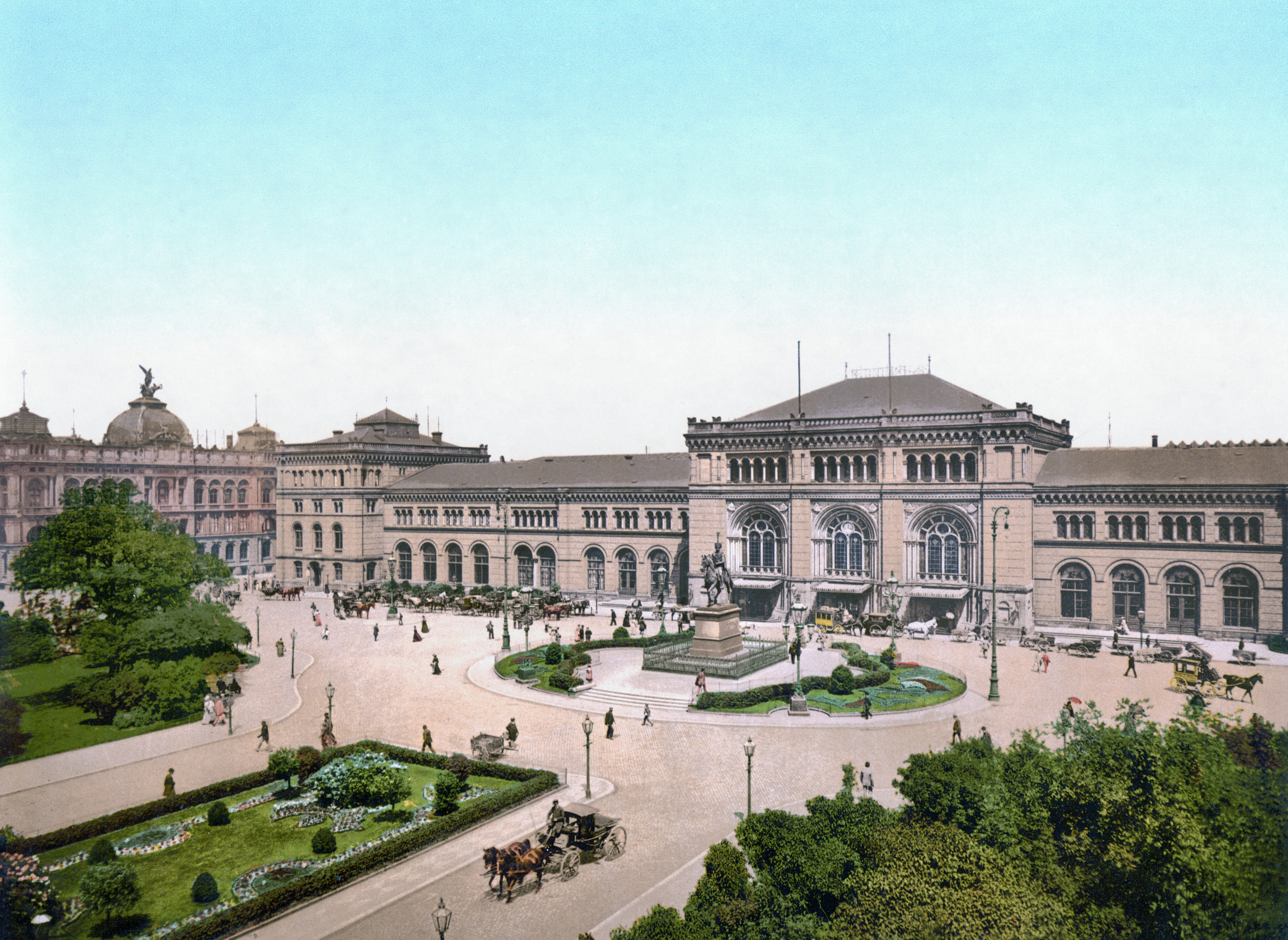
The Hauptbahnhof about 1900

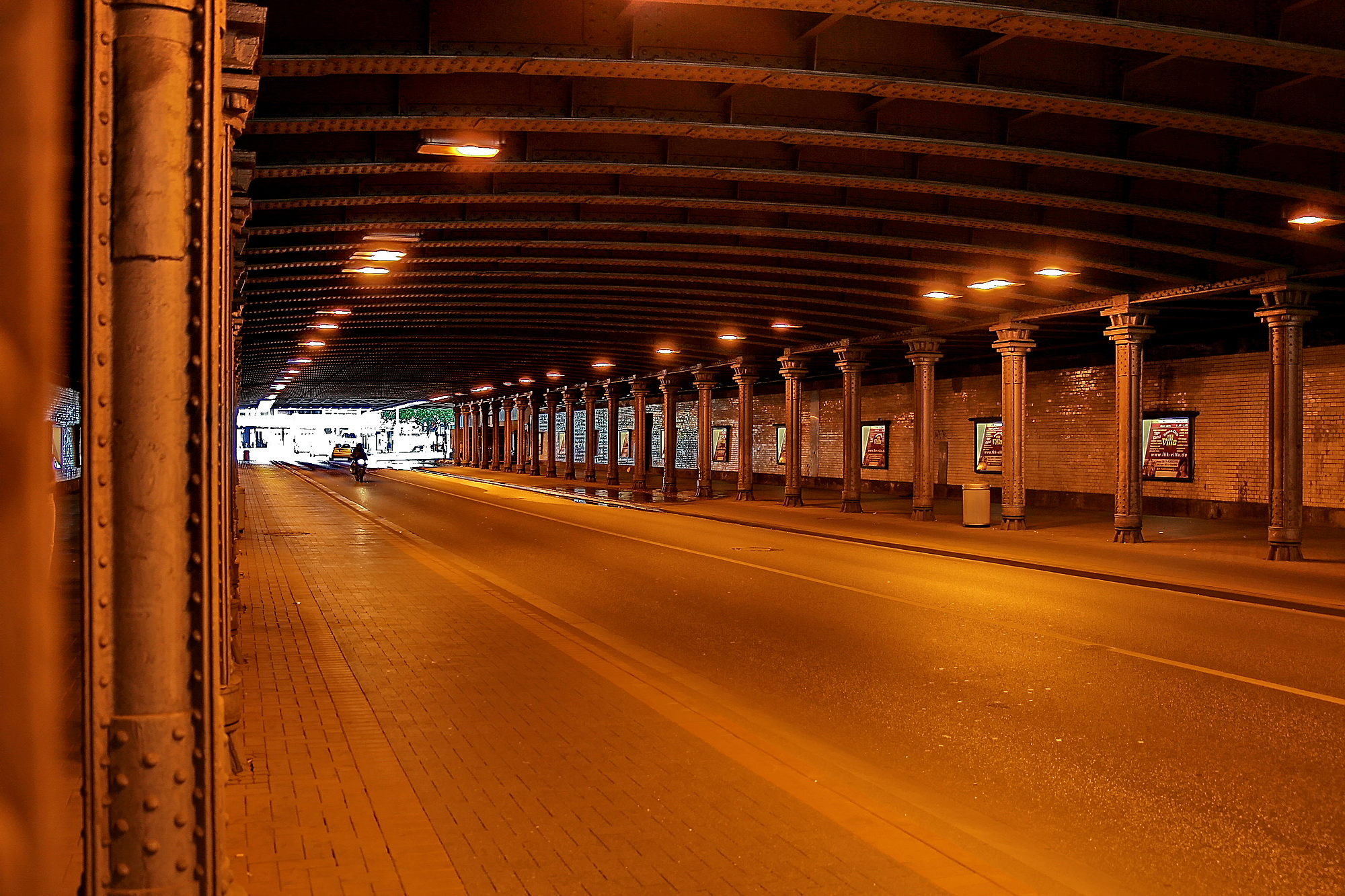
The underpass created by the raising of the tracks over the old Celler Heerstraße (looking northeast towards Raschplatz)

As the first station was built at street level and therefore hindered the expansion of the city, 8 km (5.0 mi) of railway track were laid for a new rail network that was grade-separated from the street system. In addition, the new station had a long system of tracks. After preparatory work in 1873 to relocate the workshops to Leinhausen and the marshalling yards to Hainholz and the construction of freight diversion routes, construction of the core network, which still exists, began in 1875. The new station building was designed by Hubert Oswald Stier in the Renaissance Revival style. It was again a symmetrical building with a main hall and two wings, each of which was completed by a corner building. The eastern corner building with its Kaiserzimmer (lit. 'Emperor's room') had a separate driveway. The building was designed in yellow brick with red brick stripes and a sandstone base. The four platforms with seven platform tracks and two through tracks were spanned by two halls with a 37-metre (121 ft) span. After the demolition of the nearly 30-year-old station building, the construction of the new station began in April 1877. It was opened on 22 June 1879 after 26 months of construction. Access to the platforms was via three tunnels and there were two more tunnels for the transport of luggage and for postal traffic. The system of tracks finished in 1883 comprised seven platform tracks and two central through tracks for freight trains. The train sheds consisted of two separate halls, each 37 m (121 ft) wide and 167.5 m (550 ft) long with a 9.25 m (30 ft 4 in) wide space between them for the two through tracks. The construction cost 12.7 million marks for the buildings and 22.5 million marks for the entire station precinct.

In 1910, a third hall was built between tracks 10 and 11. The new hall, made of steel, had a span of 27.5 m (90 ft 3 in) and a height of 15.3 m (50 ft 2 in) and was built to a design by municipal architect Möller. Of particular operational significance for the Hanover–Hamburg railway was the completion of the Hasenbahn (lit. 'rabbit line') – a branch line planned in 1913 from the Heath Railway from Langenhagen via Großburgwedel to Celle: from May 1938 trains could run directly between Hamburg and southern Germany without running through Lehrte; it was no longer necessary for trains to reverse in Hanover.

In the timetable of summer 1939, Hanover station had a total of 144 scheduled long-distance arrivals and departures. It was the most important junctions on Deutsche Reichsbahn’s long-distance network after the terminal stations of Berlin, Cologne, Frankfurt am Main and the main stations of Leipzig and Duisburg.

=== War damage and reconstruction ===
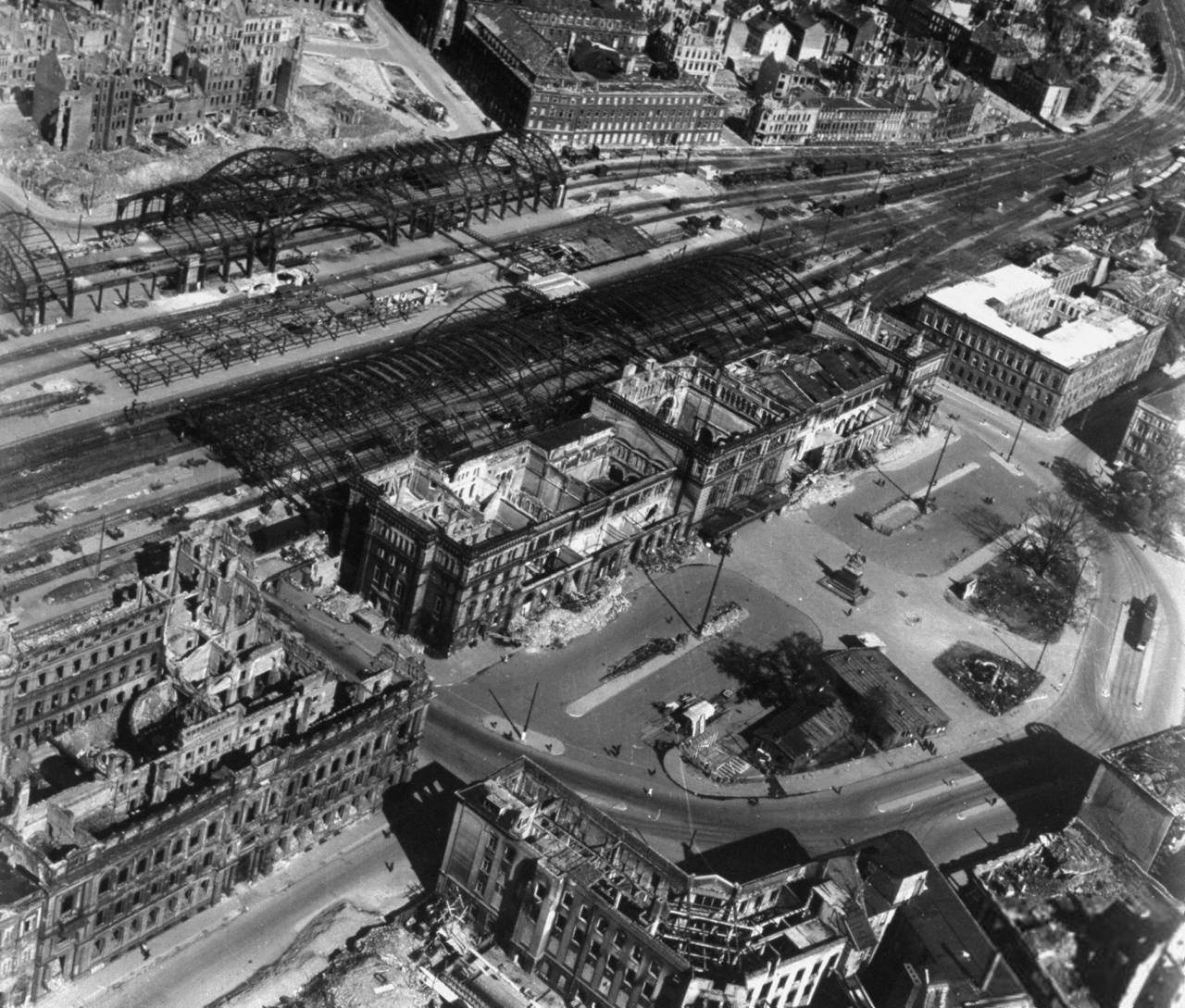
Destroyed station in 1945

The station was largely destroyed during the air raids on Hanover in July and October 1943. Only the skeleton of the halls and the outer walls of the entrance building remained. It took four days to re-open one track.

On 13 June 1945, passenger services ran for the first time after the war to Minden, Nienburg and Göttingen. On 14 August, passenger services were significantly expanded. Passenger services again ran from Hanover to Bremerhaven, Duisburg, Hamelin, Göttingen, Braunschweig and Uelzen. On 15 August 1946, Hanover was again served for the first time after the war by the Nord Express running from Paris by Berlin and thus reconnected to the international long-distance network.

After the severe bomb damage, the reconstruction of the entrance building began in the summer of 1948, resulting in a facade with newly designed interiors and the remaining steel work of the roofs of the old halls was removed and the platforms were covered by temporary wooden canopies. The platforms were rebuilt from 1959 to 1961 and the baggage platforms disappeared as baggage lifts were built on the passenger platforms. The middle entrance was widened, the side pedestrian tunnel was closed and the platforms received new canopies. Since 1957, signals and switches were controlled by a mechanical interlocking. In 1963, the fifth platform was extended on track 12 (tracks 5 and 6 were through tracks without platforms). Coming from the south, electrification of the tracks reached Hannover Hauptbahnhof on 26 May 1963. Electrification was extended to Lehrte on 20 December 1963 and to Bremen on 14 December 1964. The connection to Hamburg was electrified at the end of 1964 and the two tracks to Celle were electrified on 6 April 1965. The overhead line from Lehrte via Brunswick to Helmstedt was not completed until 1976.

=== Construction of the Hanover StadtBahn ===
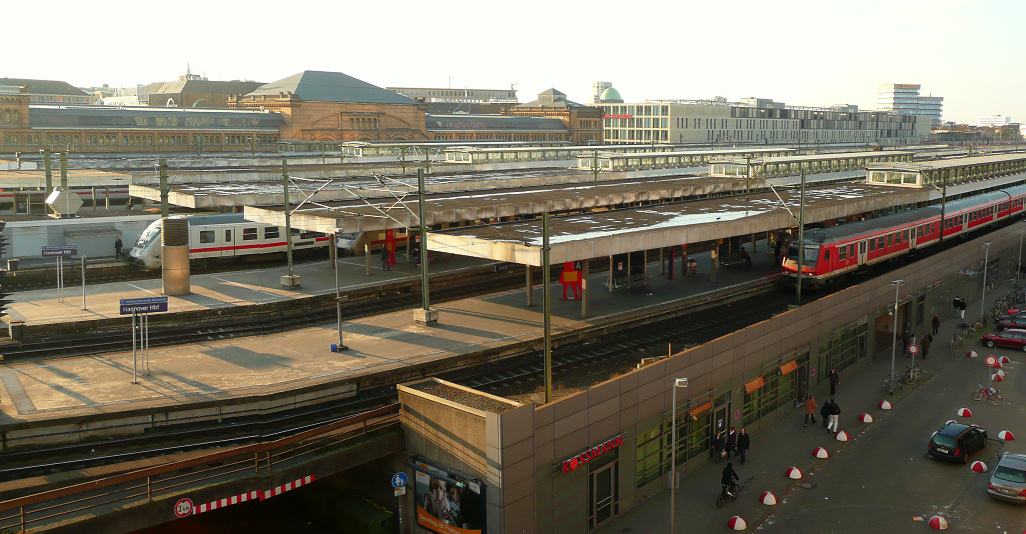
View from Raschplatz of the back of the station

The construction of the Hanover Stadtbahn caused far-reaching alterations to the station. Since the entire station had to be operated during the reconstruction, construction was only possible by blocking tracks. Between July 1969 and the spring of 1973, a sixth platform was built on tracks 13 and 14. Upon completion, two tracks were blocked from 1970 to 1975, through which the Stadtbahn tunnel and an overlying pedestrian level were built. For this, the central pedestrian tunnel was blocked and access to the platforms was via the re-opened side tunnel. As part of this restructuring the through track 6 was shifted to lie between platform tracks 8 and 9, while the through track 5 (now 40) remained at the old place (now 80). Then the station was rebuilt. The platforms including the canopies were also renewed. The western Lister Meile underpass between the main post office and the parcel post office located on Raschplatz was connected by long ramps for the transport of baggage and mail to the platforms.

With the introduction of the Intercity network in 1971, Hanover became a transfer hub, where it was possible to change between IC trains on the same platform. A passenger information system with information displays on the stairways and platforms was installed in the spring of 1988. With a total of 323 arrivals and departures of regularly scheduled long-distance trains, the station was the fourth most-important junction in the Deutsche Bundesbahn network in the summer 1989 timetable.

Construction began on Deutsche Bahn's largest electronic interlocking to date in 1993. The system, which cost about 100 million marks, was designed to control about 5,000 trains and shunting movements each day, 279 sets of points and 535 signals by ten dispatchers. According to the manufacturer, it was the largest and most advanced electronic interlocking in the world in August 1998.

The station was the most important node in Deutsche Bahn network in the summer 1996 timetable, with 398 arrivals and departures of regularly scheduled long-distance trains each day.

=== Remodelling for Expo 2000 ===
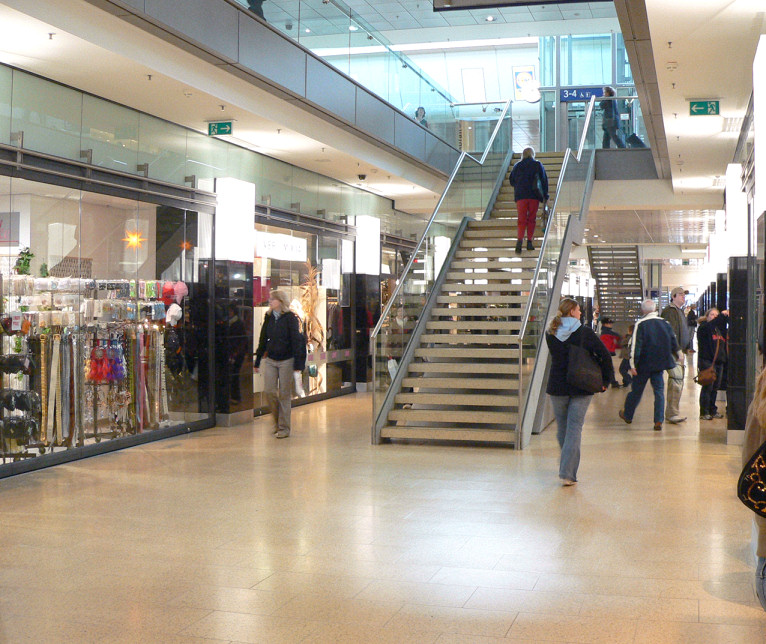
Niki-de-Saint-Phalle-Promenade on the first basement level beneath the station

The station was again completely rebuilt for Expo 2000: the entrance building was gutted to the outer walls and rebuilt; the central tunnel was enlarged and opened to the platforms in order to allow in daylight; and passenger lifts to the platforms were installed. The conversion created a promenade in the station. Among other things, a 7,000 m^{2} (75,000 sq ft) shopping area was built in the entrance building after the relocation of the ticket office and the closure of the system for transporting baggage.

Between the summer of 2004 and the spring of 2006, the passageway in the basement was extensively modernised and adapted to become part of the Niki-de-Saint-Phalle-Promenade from Kröpcke to Raschplatz. There is a wide variety of outlets in the 20,000 m^{2} (215,000 sq ft) of retail space on two levels, and most stores are open to 10 pm on weekdays.

The Hanover S-Bahn was opened on 28 May 2000. Platforms 1 and 2 now serve S-Bahn services towards H-Bismarckstraße and Wunstorf and platforms 13 and 14 serve S-Bahn services towards Lehrte and Celle. At the same time, the approaches to the station were changed: in the west an additional pair of tracks was built south of the existing tracks for the S-Bahn track to Lehrte and in the east an additional track was built to the north of the existing tracks.

== Train services ==
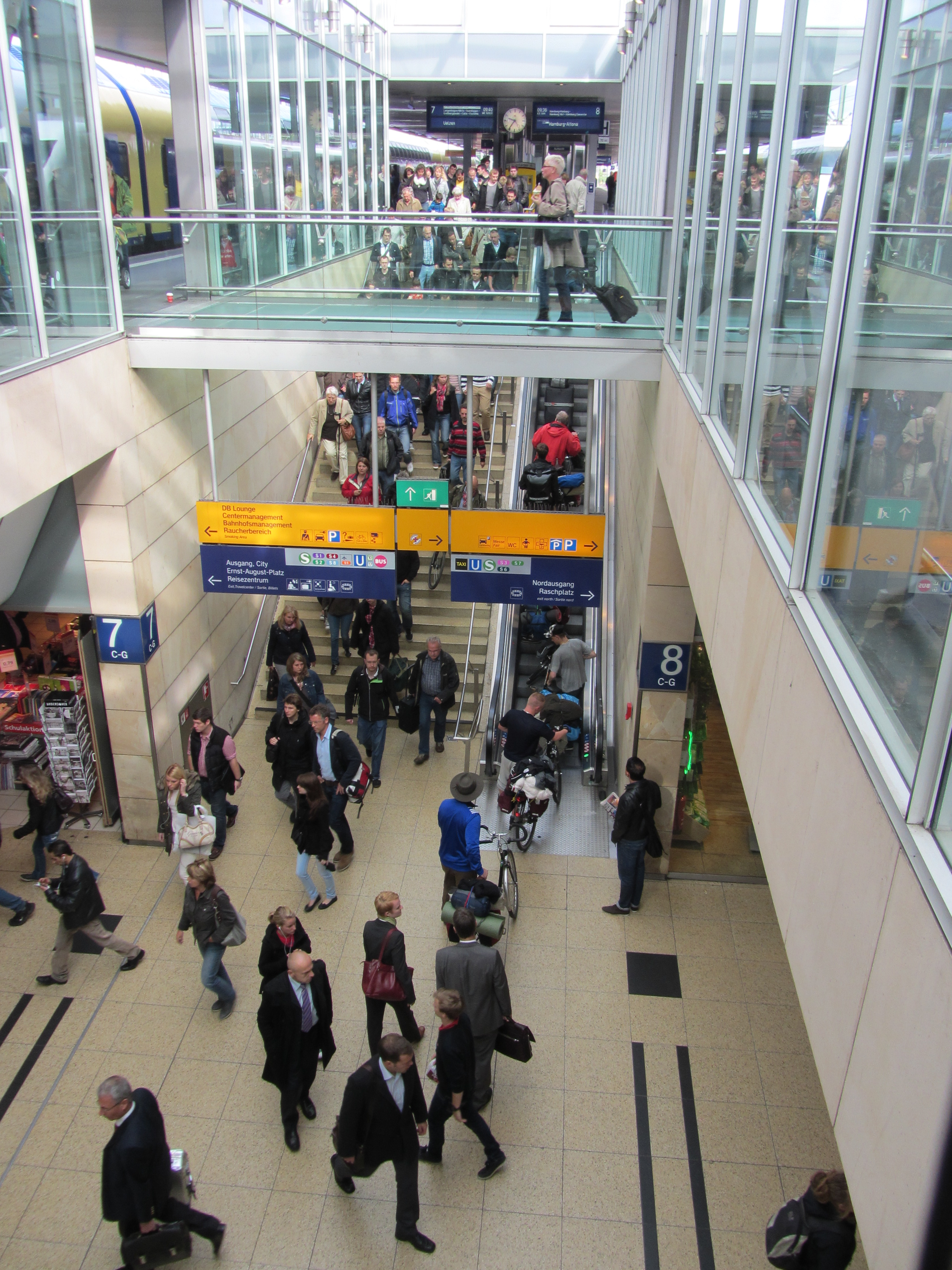
Up to platform 7/8

Hannover Hauptbahnhof is served by some 622 trains daily, excluding the Hanover Stadtbahn and tramway. Hannover Hauptbahnhof connects the north-south ICE lines from Hamburg to Munich with the west–east lines from Dortmund and Cologne towards Berlin.

In the 2026 timetable, the following services stop at the station:

=== Long-distance services ===
| Line | Route | | | Interval (min) |
|---|---|---|---|---|
| ICE 4 | Padborg – Flensburg – | Hamburg – Hanover – Frankfurt – Frankfurt Airport | | 240 |
| ICE 4 | Hamburg-Altona – Hamburg Dammtor – | Hamburg – Hanover – Frankfurt – Frankfurt Airport | | 240 |
| ICE 10 | Cologne – | Düsseldorf – Duisburg – Essen – Dortmund – | Hamm – Bielefeld – Hanover – Wolfsburg – Berlin – Berlin Ostbahnhof | 60 |
| ICE 10 | Cologne – | Wuppertal – Hagen – | Hamm – Bielefeld – Hanover – Wolfsburg – Berlin – Berlin Ostbahnhof | 60 |
| ICE 12 | Zürich ← Basel ← Freiburg ← Karslruhe ← Mannheim ← Frankfurt – Hanover – Wolfsburg – Berlin – Berlin Ostbahnhof | | | One train pair at night |
| ICE 14 | Aachen – Cologne – Düsseldorf – Essen – | Bochum – Dortmund – Hamm – Bielefeld – | Hanover – Berlin – Berlin Ostbahnhof | 120 |
| ICE 14 | Aachen – Cologne – Düsseldorf – Essen – | Münster – Osnabrück – | Hanover – Berlin – Berlin Ostbahnhof | 120 |
| ICE 16 | Oldenburg – Bremen – Hanover – Berlin – Berlin Südkreuz | | | 240 |
| ICE 19 | Berlin East – Berlin Hbf – Berlin-Spandau – Hannover – Bielefeld – Hagen – Wuppertal – Cologne (– Bonn – Koblenz – Mainz – Mannheim – Heidelberg – Stuttgart) | | | 120 |
| ICE/ECE 20 | Hamburg – Hannover – Göttingen – Frankfurt – Mannheim – Karlsruhe – Freiburg – Basel Bad – Basel SBB | | | 120 |
| ICE 22 | Kiel – Hamburg – Hannover – Göttingen – Frankfurt – Frankfurt Airport – Mannheim – Stuttgart | | | 120 |
| ICE 24 | Hamburg-Altona – Hamburg – Hannover – Göttingen – Kassel – Fulda – Würzburg – Augsburg – Munich – | | Schwarzach-St. Veit | One train pair |
| ICE 24 | Hamburg-Altona – Hamburg – Hannover – Göttingen – Kassel – Fulda – Würzburg – Augsburg – Munich – | | Innsbruck | One train pair |
| ICE 24 | Westerland – Hamburg – Hannover – Göttingen – Kassel – Frankfurt | | | One train pair |
| ICE 25 | Hamburg-Altona – Hamburg – Hannover – Göttingen – Fulda – Würzburg – Nuremberg – Ingolstadt – Munich | | | 60 |
| ICE 26 | Bremen – Hannover – Göttingen – Kassel-Wilhelmshöhe – Marburg – Frankfurt – Heidelberg – Karlsruhe | | | 240 |
| ICE 43 | Hannover – Bielefeld – Dortmund – Wuppertal – Cologne – Frankfurt Airport – Mannheim – Karlsruhe – Freiburg – Basel SBB | | | Some trains |
| IC 55 | Dresden – Riesa – Leipzig – Halle – Magdeburg – Hannover – Bielefeld – Hamm – Dortmund – Wuppertal – Köln – Bonn – Koblenz – Mainz – Mannheim – Heidelberg – Stuttgart (– Tübingen) | | | 120 |
| IC 56 | Norddeich Mole – Emden – Leer – Oldenburg – Bremen – Hannover – Magdeburg – Halle – Leipzig | | | 120 |
| ICE 77 | Berlin Ostbahnhof – Berlin-Spandau – Hannover – Osnabrück – Bad Bentheim – Amersfoort Centraal – Amsterdam (IC) | | | 120 |
| FLX 15 | Stuttgart – Heidelberg – Frankfurt (Main) Süd – Fulda – Kassel-Wilhelmshöhe – Göttingen – Hannover – Lüneburg – Hamburg | | | 4 train pairs/week |
| FLX 30 | Leipzig – Lutherstadt Wittenberg – Berlin Südkreuz – Berlin Hbf – Berlin-Spandau – Hannover – Bielefeld – Dortmund – Essen – Duisburg – Düsseldorf – Cologne – Aachen | | | 1-2 train pairs daily |
| NJ 401 | Hamburg – Lüneburg – Hannover – Frankfurt – Baden-Baden – Basel – Zürich | | | Individual services, operator: ÖBB |
| NJ 491 | Hamburg – Hannover – Passau – Wels – Linz – Amstetten – St. Pölten – Vienna | | | Individual services, operator: ÖBB |
| NJ 40491 | Hamburg – Hannover – Würzburg – Nürnberg – Augsburg – Kufstein – Wörgl – Innsbruck | | | Individual services, operator: ÖBB |

In March 2026 GoVolta services began calling.

=== Regional services ===
| Line | Route | Interval (min) | Operator |
|---|---|---|---|
| RE 1 | Norddeich Mole – Emden – Leer – Oldenburg – Bremen – Verden – Nienburg – Neustadt am Rübenberge – Hannover | 120 (one additional peak-hour service from/to Bremen) (hourly service to Bremen with RE 8) | DB Regio Nord |
| RE 2 | (Uelzen – Celle – Langenhagen –) Hannover – Sarstedt – Kreiensen – Northeim – Göttingen | (120) 60 (hourly service to Hanover and Uelzen with RE 3) | Metronom |
| RE 3 | Hannover - Langenhagen – Celle – Uelzen – Lüneburg – Winsen – Hamburg | 120 (hourly service between Hanover and Uelzen with RE 2) | Metronom |
| RE 8 | Bremerhaven-Lehe – Bremerhaven – Bremen – Verden – Nienburg – Neustadt am Rübenberge – Hannover | 120 (one additional peak-hour service from/to Bremen and Oldenburg) (hourly service to Bremen with RE 1) | DB Regio Nord |
| RE 10 | Hannover – Sarstedt – Hildesheim – Salzgitter-Ringelheim – Goslar – Bad Harzburg | 60 | erixx |
| RE 30 | Wolfsburg – Gifhorn – Lehrte – Hanover | 60 | Enno (Metronom) |
| RE 60 | Braunschweig – Peine – Lehrte – Hannover – (Minden – Löhne – Osnabrück – Rheine) | 120 (with RE 70 approximately half-hourly service between Hanover and Braunschweig, hourly to Löhne) | Westfalenbahn |
| RE 70 | Braunschweig – Peine – Lehrte – Hannover – (Minden – Löhne – Bielefeld) | 120 (with RE 60 approximately half-hourly service between Hanover and Braunschweig, hourly to Löhne) | Westfalenbahn |
| RB 38 | Hannover – Langenhagen – Schwarmstedt – Walsrode – Soltau – Schneverdingen – Buchholz i.d.N. (– Hamburg-Harburg) | 60 (at the weekend every 120 minutes to Hamburg-Harburg) | Regionalverkehre Start Deutschland |

=== Hannover S-Bahn ===
Hannover Hauptbahnhof is served by all S-bahn services. It is in Zone 1 of Hanover.

- Hannover S-Bahn services S 1 Minden - Haste - Wunstorf - Hannover - Weetzen - Haste
- Hannover S-Bahn services S 2 Nienburg - Wunstorf - Hannover - Weetzen - Haste
- Hannover S-Bahn services S 3 Hannover - Lehrte - Hildesheim
- Hannover S-Bahn services S 4 Bennemühlen - Langenhagen - Hannover - Hannover Messe/Laatzen - Hildesheim
- Hannover S-Bahn services S 5 Hannover Airport - Langenhagen - Hannover - Weetzen - Hameln - Paderborn
- Hannover S-Bahn services S 6 Hannover - Celle
- Hannover S-Bahn services S 7 Hannover - Lehrte - Celle
- Hannover S-Bahn services S 8 Hannover Airport - Langenhagen - Hannover - Hannover Messe/Laatzen

=== Tram services ===
Hannover Hauptbahnhof is served by all A, B and D lines. It is the terminus of line 8 and the event line 18. The station is the only one on the Hanover Stadtbahn where one can change from A to B line via Cross-platform interchange.

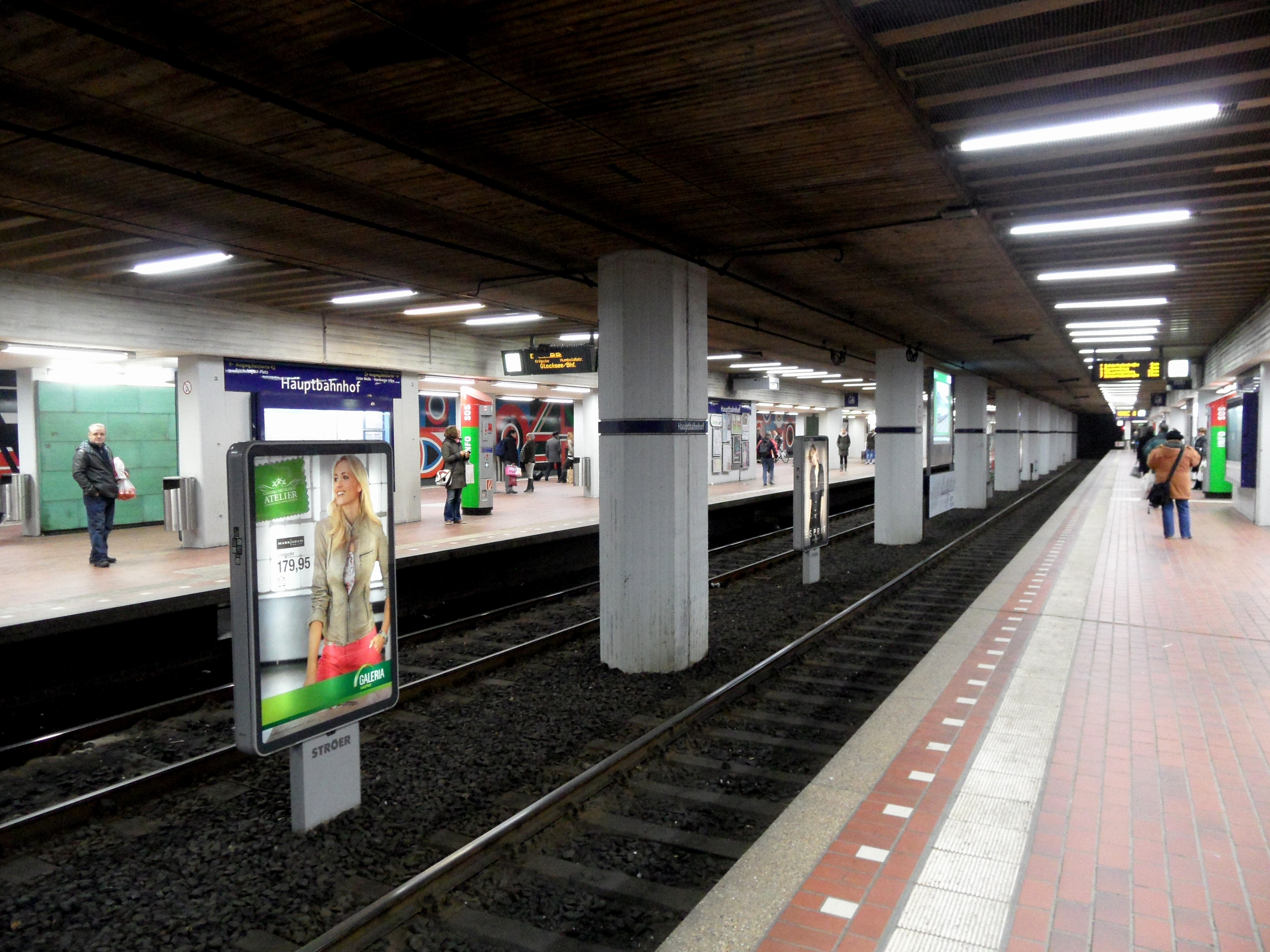
Stadtbahn station platform

| Towards | Previous station | Hannover Hbf | Next station | Towards |
|---|---|---|---|---|
| Langenhagen | Werderstraße | 1 | Kröpcke | Sarstedt |
| Alte Heide | Werderstraße | 2 | Kröpcke | Rethen; Döhren Bf. |
| Atwärmbuchen | Sedanstraße | 3 | Kröpcke | Wettbergen |
| Schierholzstraße | Sedanstraße | 7 | Kröpcke | Wettbergen |
| Hauptbahnhof | Termnius | 8 | Kröpcke | Messe/Nord |
| Fasanenkrug | Sedanstraße | 9 | Kröpcke | Empelde |
| Ahlem | Steintor | 10 | Thielenplatz/Schauspielhaus | Aegidientorplatz |
| Wallensteinstraße | Steintor | 17 | Thielenplatz/Schauspielhaus | Aegidientorplatz |
| Hauptbahnhof | Terminus | 18 (during the Hanover Fairground) | Kröpcke | Messe/Nord |

== See also ==
- Rail transport in Germany
