= Aegidientorplatz (Hanover Stadtbahn station) =

Underground light rail station in Hanover, Germany

Coordinates: 52.3681°N 9.7433°E

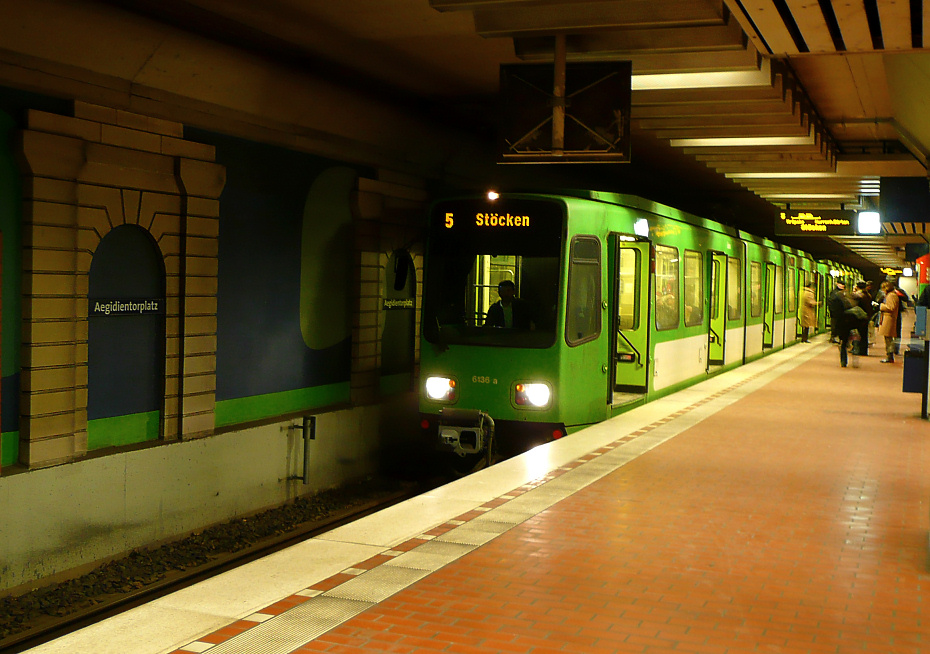
- TW 6000 towards Stöcken on line 5 calling at Aegidientorplatz

General information
- System: Hanover Stadtbahn station
- Operator: Üstra Hannoversche Verkehrsbetriebe AG
- Lines: B (1-2-8-18); C (4-5-6-11-16)
- Platforms: 2 side platforms (in levels - -2 direction city center, -3 towards suburbs)
- Tracks: 4 (2 on each level)

Construction
- Structure type: Underground station
- Platform levels: 2 platform level, 1 distributor level
- Parking: No
- Cycle facilities: No

Other information
- Fare zone: GVH: A
Location

Aegidientorplatz is a Hannover Stadtbahn station on lines B and C. The station is located beneath Aegidientorplatz, one of the squares in Hanover Mitte.

Aegidientorplatz is the only station where passengers can change from B lines to C lines on the same platform.

Terminus	Previous station	Aegidientorplatz	Next station	Terminus
Langenhagen	Kröpcke	1	Schlägerstraße	Sarstedt
Alte Heide	Kröpcke	2	Schlägerstraße	Rethen; Döhren Bf.
Garbsen	Kröpcke	4	Marienstraße	Roderbruch
Stöcken	Kröpcke	5	Marienstraße	Anderten
Nordhafen	Kröpcke	6	Marienstraße	Messe/Ost
Hannover Hauptbahnhof	Kröpcke	8	Schlägerstraße	Messe/Nord
Haltenhoffstraße	Kröpcke	11	Marienstraße	Zoo
Königsworther Platz	Kröpcke	16 (during fairgrounds)	Marienstraße	Messe/Ost
Hannover Hauptbahnhof	Kröpcke	18 (during fairgrounds)	Schlägerstraße	Messe/Nord
