= Hanover Fairground =

Exhibition area in Hanover

Coordinates: 52°19′26″N 9°48′10″E

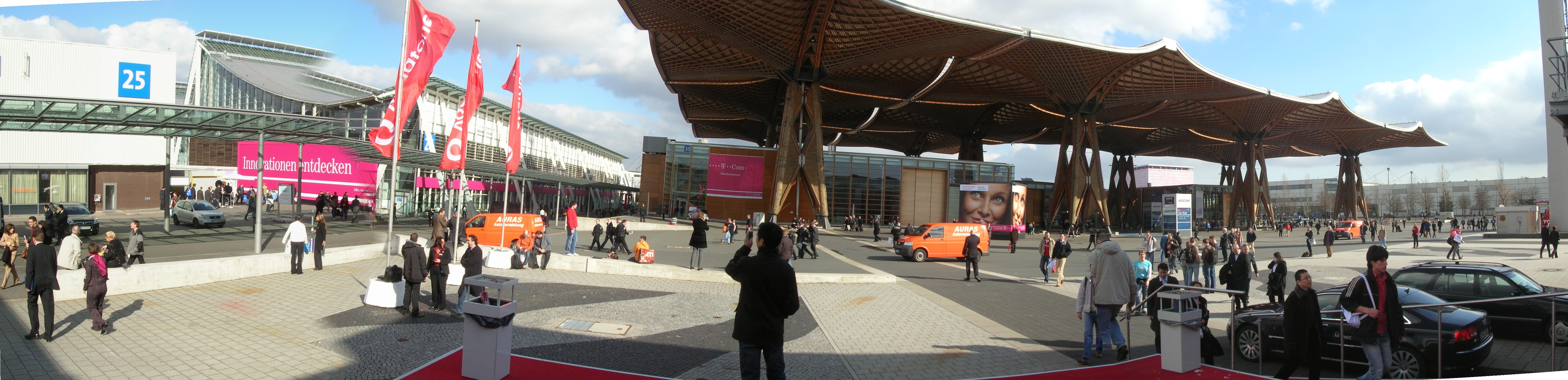
Open exhibition area at the Hanover Fairground featuring the famous Expo 2000 wooden roof

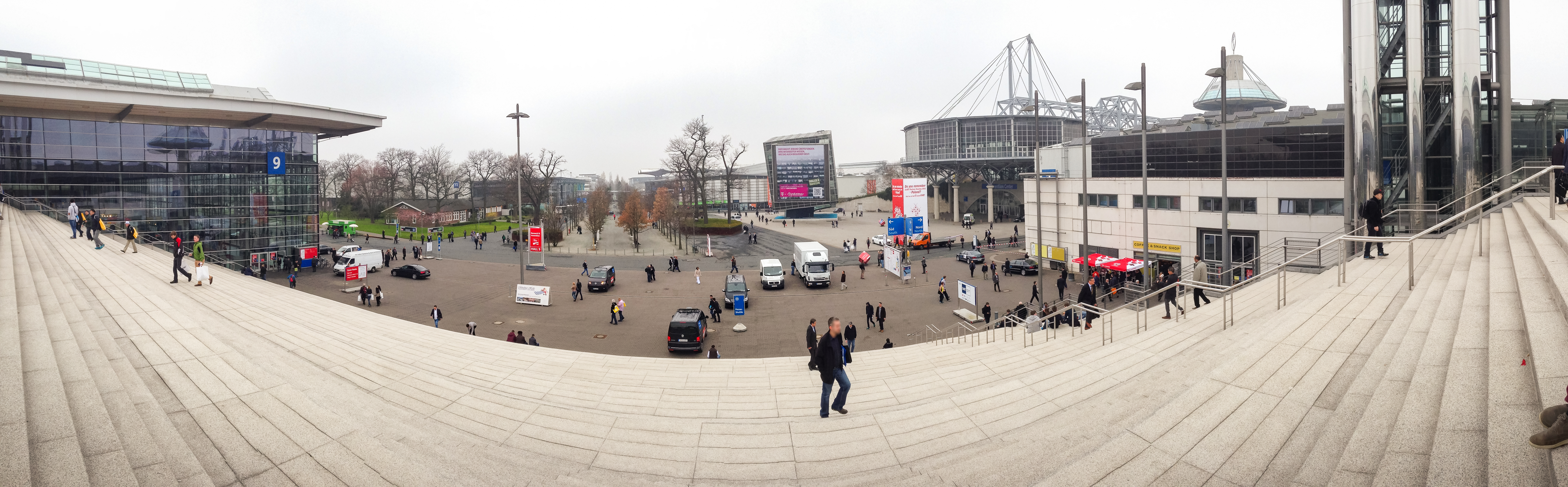
Expo-Allee N and stairs to the Place of Nations

The Hanover Fairground (German: Messegelände Hannover) is an exhibition area in the Mittelfeld district of Hanover, Germany. Featuring 392,453 m^{2} (4.2 million sq.ft.) of covered indoor space, 58,000 m^{2} (624,306 sq ft) of open-air space, 24 halls and pavilions, and a convention center with 35 function rooms, it is the largest exhibition ground in the world.

== History ==
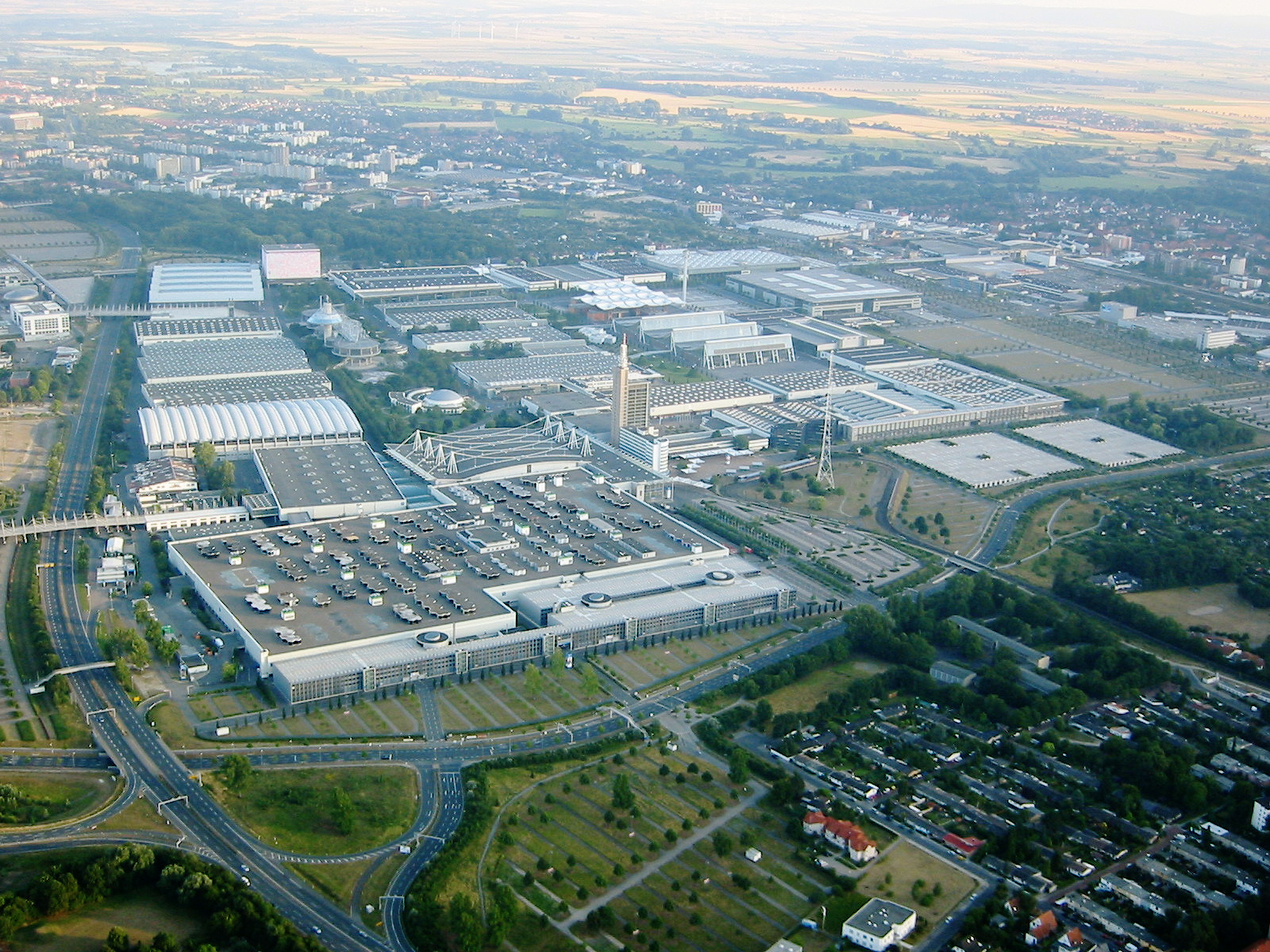
Aerial view of the trade fair ground

The area of the fairground originally was an aircraft works. After World War II, the British military government in Allied-occupied Germany wanted to hold a trade fair and sought for a good place, since Leipzig, the traditional fairground of Germany, was unavailable, being in the Soviet occupation zone. The hangars in Laatzen, south of Hanover, were deemed suitable for this purpose, and so the Hanover Fair, then named Exportmesse 1947 was first held in 1947 to promote the economic recovery in the Bizone. The concept proved to be successful, and so a permanent fairground was established, growing over the years.

=== Timeline ===
- 1947: Exportmesse held for the first time (August 18 - September 7).
- 1948: First intercontinental telephone call between Hanover and New York City.
- 1950: Exportmesse is renamed to Deutsche Industrie-Messe
- 1956-1958: Hermesturm erected.
- 1961: The Deutsche Industrie-Messe is renamed to Hannover Messe.
- 1970: Hall 1 is opened, then the largest exhibition hall in the world. It becomes permanent home to CeBIT, a subdivision of the Hanover Industry Fair.
- 1986: The CeBIT computer expo is held independently for the first time, after outgrowing the Industry Fair.
- 1990s: The fairground undergoes extensive remodeling in preparation for the Expo 2000. Hall 13 is constructed, at its time of completion the largest hall in the world without internal structural columns.
- 2000, June–October: The Expo 2000 world exhibition is held at the fairground and the surrounding areas.
- 2000: The Messehochhaus at the northern end of the area becomes the new home of the Deutsche Messe AG, the fairground's operator. It is a 20-floor highrise that stands at 110 m (360 ft) with antenna.
- 2018: After almost 20 years of declining visitor numbers, CeBIT closes its doors for the final time in June 2018.

== Structures ==
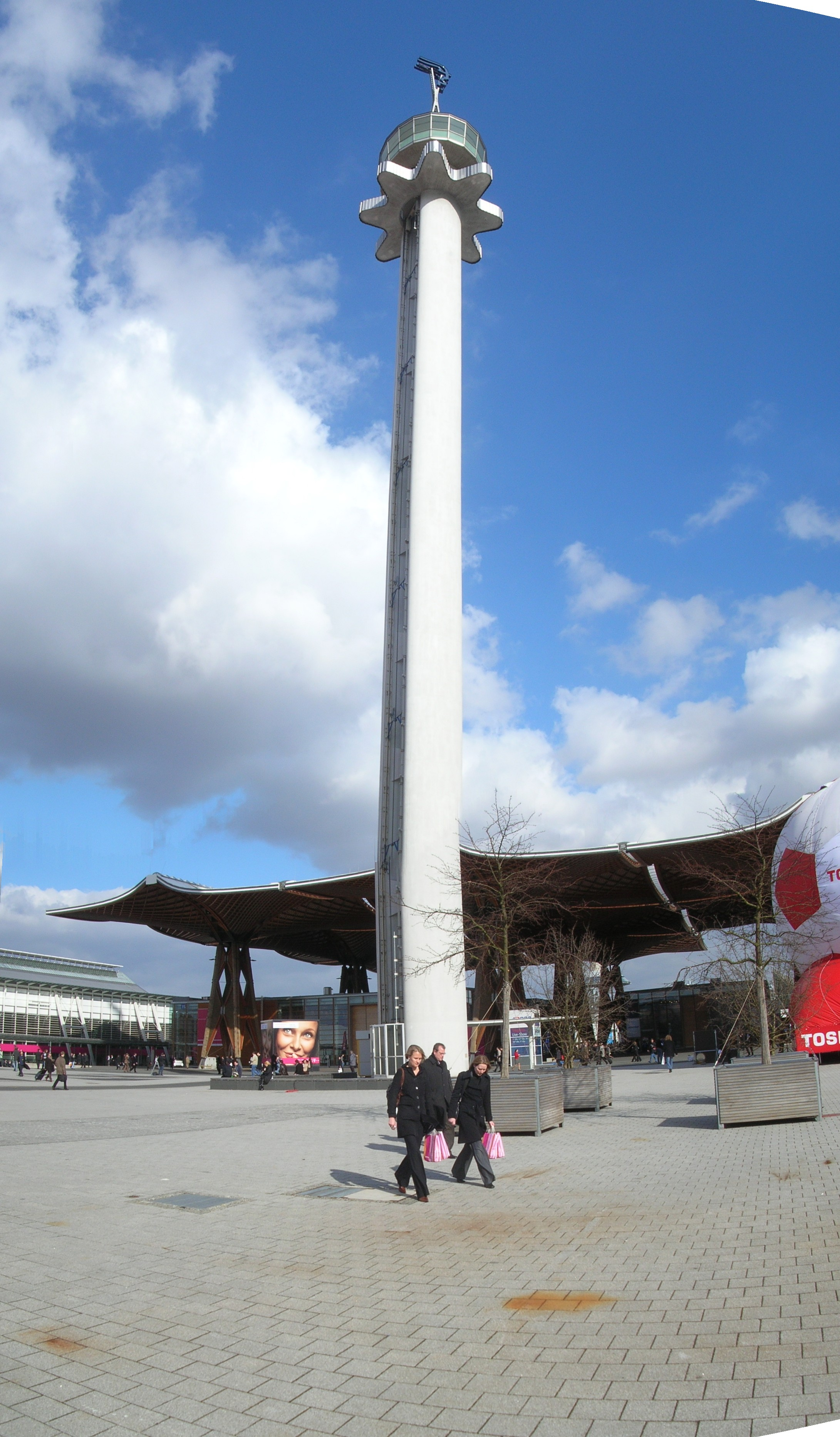
Hermes tower on the Hanover Fairground

The Hermesturm (Hermes Tower) is a tower built of two concrete tubes on the fairground. The building was constructed between 1956 and 1958. Its total height, including the antenna, is 88.8 m, an observation deck at 65 m can be reached with an elevator.

== Connection to public transit ==
=== Northern light rail line ===
The fairground has been linked to the city's tramway network since 1949. The original terminus, called Messegelände, has been moved several times, the last time in 1982, when the line was upgraded to become part of the Hanover Stadtbahn, and is now situated at the entrance Nord 2, between halls 1 and 18. Service to the city centre is provided by the regular line 8 as well as the peak line 18. During the large fairs, like CeBIT or Hannover Messe, there is a special peak hour express service, denoted by the letter E, which only stops at the stations Hauptbahnhof, Kröpcke and Aegidientorplatz. By employing highly efficient dispatching methods, trains can run in intervals as little as 90 seconds, each train able up to carry as many as 700 passengers.

Towards	Previous station	Messe/Nord	Next station	Towards
Hauptbahnhof	Am Mittelfelde	8	Terminus	Messe/Nord
Hauptbahnhof	Am Mittelfelde	18	Terminus	Messe/Nord

=== Eastern light rail line ===
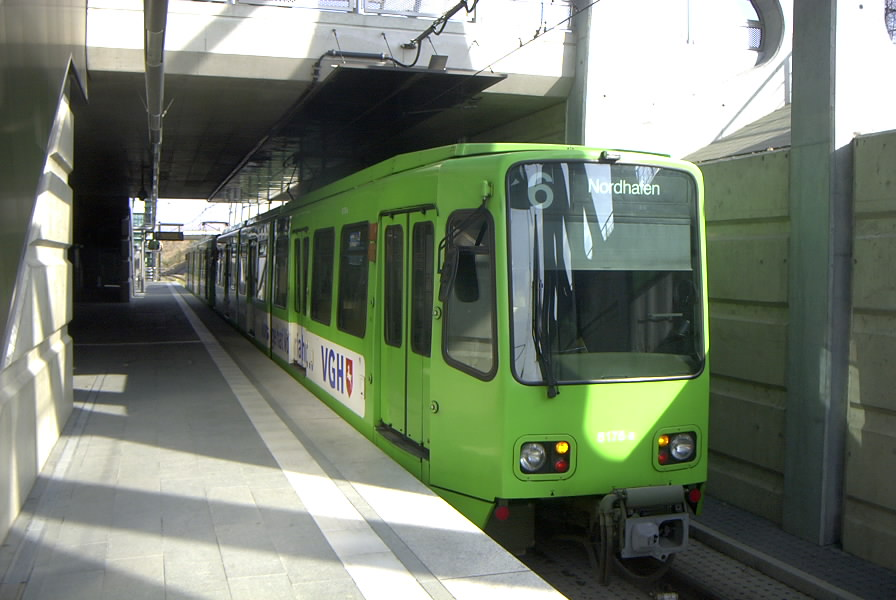
Messe/Ost station with a train

For the Expo 2000, a new line was built that connects the fairground to the Kronsberg city borough. It is currently served by the line 6. When there are fairs or other large-scale events on the fairground, the additional line 16 increases the number of services. There are no express trains.

As soon as the line was completed, the old terminus at Hall 1 was renamed to EXPO/Nord whilst the new terminus carried the name of EXPO/Ost. After the Expo, the terminuses were renamed to Messe/Nord (lines 8 and 18) and Messe/Ost (lines 6 and 16) respectively.

Towards	Previous station	Messe/Ost	Next station	Towards
Nordhafen	Stockholmer Allee	6	Terminus	Messe/Ost
Königsworther Platz	Stockholmer Allee	16 (during fairs)	Terminus	Messe/Ost

=== Railway ===
In the 1960s, a railway station was built near the halls, however this was soon found to be impractical, as the station was constructed as a terminal of a branch line, making connections to and from main line trains difficult. However, it found its uses for dedicated services to the fairground.

For the Expo 2000, an entirely new railway station was constructed some 500 metres west of the fairground on the Hanoverian Southern Railway and the Hanover–Würzburg high-speed railway. It is linked by the Skywalk, a people mover that works like a horizontal escalator. The railway station is named Hannover Messe/Laatzen after the suburb of Laatzen, which has a common border with Hanover near the fairground. It is only notably used during CeBIT, Hannover Messe and Agritechnica, and outside of this period, only regional services stop at the station. Since December 2008 the station has been connected to the Hanover S-Bahn, the city's suburban railway system.

Preceded by Festhalle Frankfurt	ATP Tour World Championships venues 1996 – 1999	Succeeded by Pavilhão Atlântico
