= Königsworther Platz (Hanover Stadtbahn station) =

Subway station in Hanover, Germany

Coordinates: 52.3783°N 9.7231°E

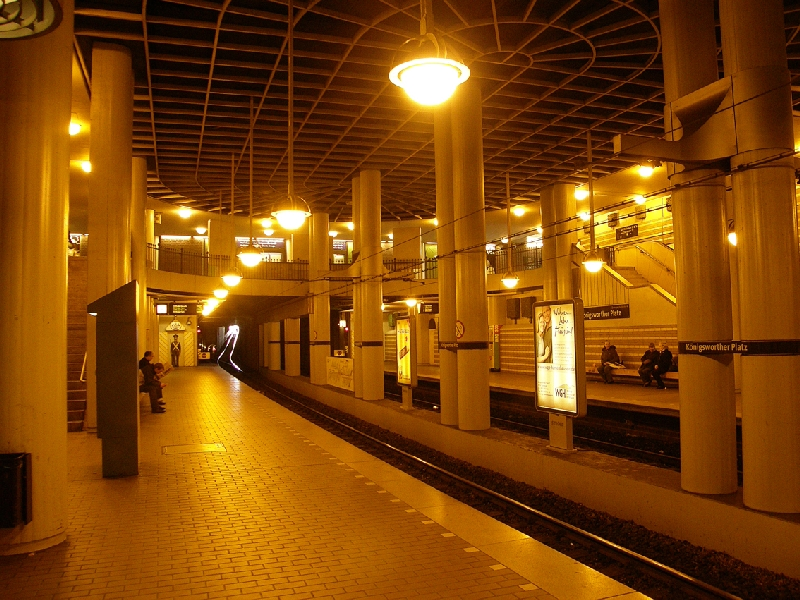

General information
- System: Hanover Stadtbahn station
- Operator: Üstra Hannoversche Verkehrsbetriebe AG
- Line: 4, 5, 16
- Platforms: 2 side platforms
- Tracks: 2

Construction
- Structure type: Underground
- Platform levels: 2

Other information
- Fare zone: GVH: A
Location

Königsworther Platz is a Hanover Stadtbahn station served by lines 4 and 5. Fairground line 16 also terminates here. This station consists of a mezzanine level and two side platforms.

This station resembles a typical Berlin U-Bahn station: in fact there are lighting lanterns with hot light bulbs.

Towards	Next station	Königsworther Platz	Next station	Towards
Garbsen	Leibniz Universität	4	Steintor	Roderbruch
Stöcken	Leibniz Universität	5	Steintor	Anderten
Königsworther Platz	Terminus	16 (fairground line)	Steintor	Messe/Ost
