= Bad Oeynhausen station =

Railway station in Bad Oeynhausen, Germany

Bad Oeynhausen
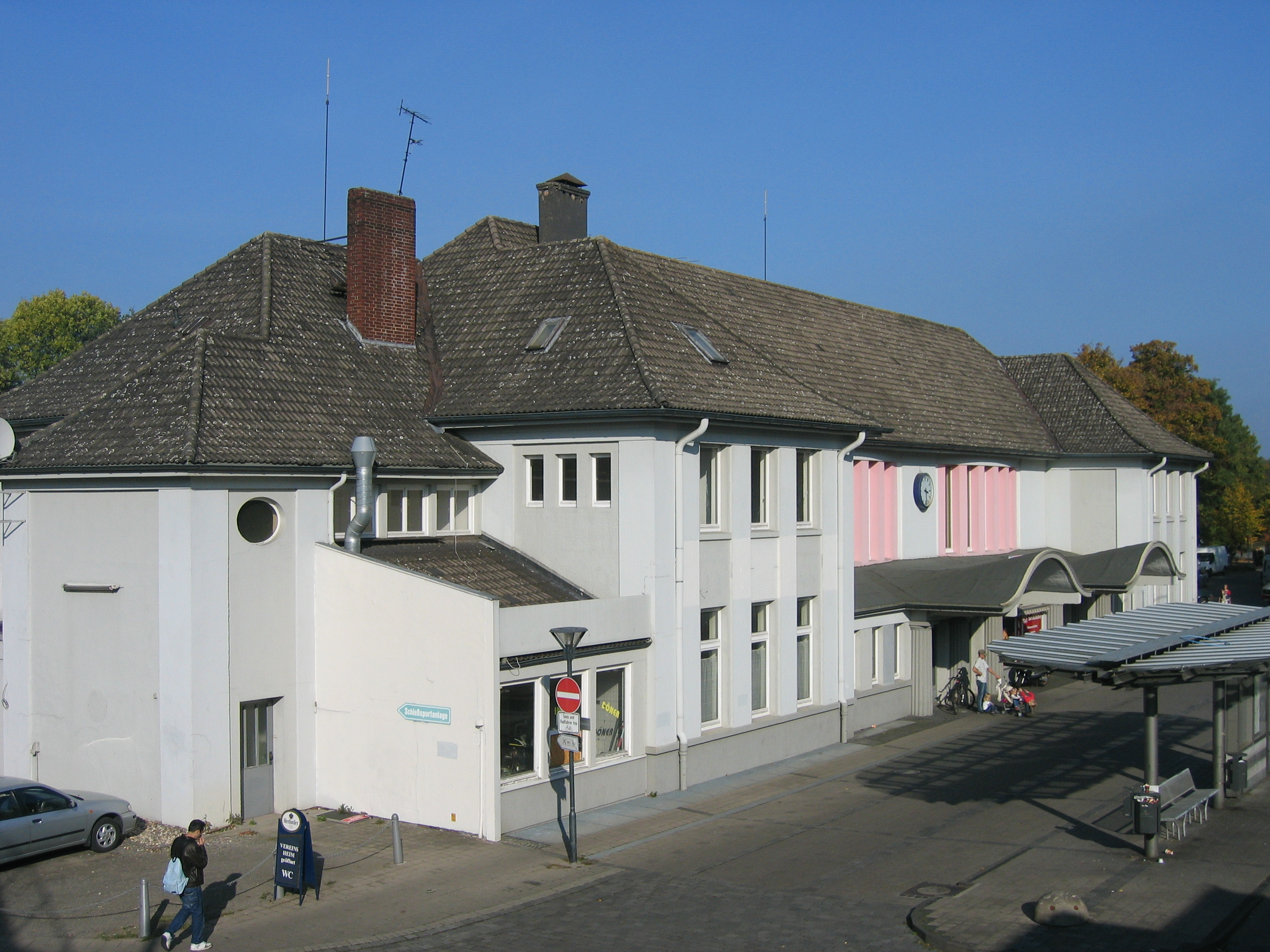
- Bad Oeynhausen railway station

General information
- Location: Herforder Str. 82, Bad Oeynhausen, NRW; Germany
- Coordinates: 52°12′18″N 8°47′46″E
- Line: Hamm–Minden railway
- Platforms: 3
- Tracks: 4

Construction
- Accessible: Yes

Other information
- Station code: 317
- DS100 code: HOY
- IBNR: 8000732
- Category: 3
- Fare zone: Westfalentarif: 63211
- Website: www.bahnhof.de

History
- Opened: 1847
Services
Preceding station	DB Fernverkehr	Following station
Herford towards Stuttgart Hbf	IC 55	Minden towards Dresden Hbf
Preceding station	National Express Germany	Following station
Löhne towards Cologne/Bonn Airport	RE 6 (Rhein-Weser-Express)	Porta Westfalica towards Minden
Preceding station		Following station
Löhne towards Bielefeld Hbf	RE 78	Porta Westfalica towards Nienburg (Weser)
Preceding station		Following station
Löhne towards Rheine	RE 60	Porta Westfalica towards Braunschweig Hbf
Löhne towards Bielefeld Hbf	RE 70	Porta Westfalica towards Braunschweig Hbf
Location

Bad Oeynhausen (German: Bahnhof Bad Oeynhausen) is a railway station in the town of Bad Oeynhausen, North Rhine-Westphalia, Germany. The station lies on the Hamm–Minden railway and the train services are operated by Deutsche Bahn and WestfalenBahn.

Bad Oeynhausen has another station Bad Oeynhausen Süd, 1 km south of this station.

== Train services ==
The station is served by the following service(s): In long-distance traffic, the station is served every two hours by an Intercity service on line IC 55 between Stuttgart and Dresden. During early or late hours some Intercity-Express services also stop in Bad Oeynhausen.

Line	Route	Frequency
IC 55; ICE 55	Dresden – Leipzig – Magdeburg – Braunschweig – Hanover – Minden – Bad Oeynhausen – Herford – Bielefeld – Gütersloh – Hamm – Wuppertal – Cologne – Bonn – Koblenz – Mainz – Mannheim – Heidelberg – Stuttgart	Every 2 hours
RE 6	Minden – Bad Oeynhausen – Herford – Bielefeld – Hamm – Dortmund – Essen – Duisburg – Düsseldorf Airport – Düsseldorf – Neuss – Cologne – Cologne/Bonn Airport	Hourly
RE 60	Rheine – Osnabrück – Bad Oeynhausen – Minden – Hanover – Braunschweig	Every 2 hours
RE 70	Bielefeld – Herford – Bad Oeynhausen – Minden – Hanover – Braunschweig	Every 2 hours
RE 78	Bielefeld – Herford – Bad Oeynhausen – Minden – Nienburg	Every 2 hours
