= Petershagen-Lahde station =

Railway station in Petershagen, Germany

Petershagen-Lahde
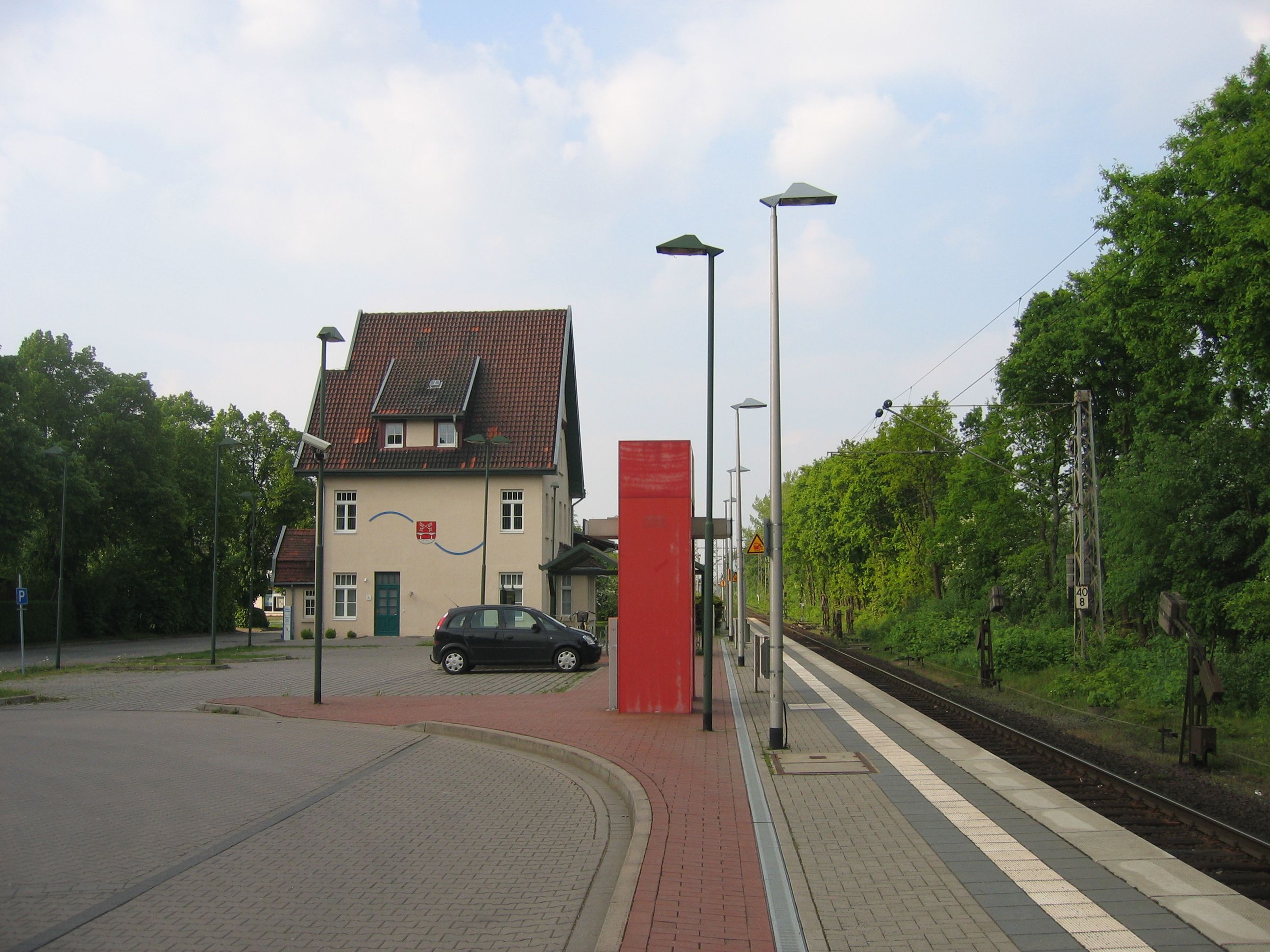
- Petershagen-Lahde railway station

General information
- Location: Petershagen, North Rhine-Westphalia; Germany
- Coordinates: 52.2205°N 9.0035°E
- System: Bf
- Line: Weser-Aller Railway
- Platforms: 1
- Tracks: 1

Other information
- Fare zone: Westfalentarif: 63721
Location

Petershagen-Lahde (German: Bahnhof Petershagen-Lahde) is a railway station located in Petershagen, Germany. The station is located on the Weser-Aller Railway. The train services are operated by Deutsche Bahn.

== Train services ==
The following services currently call at the station:

- Regional services RE 78 Nienburg - Minden - Bielefeld
- Local services RB 76 Rotenburg - Verden - Nienburg - Minden

Preceding station		Following station
Leese-Stolzenau towards Nienburg	RE 78	Minden towards Bielefeld Hbf
