= Peine station =

Railway station in Peine, Germany

Peine
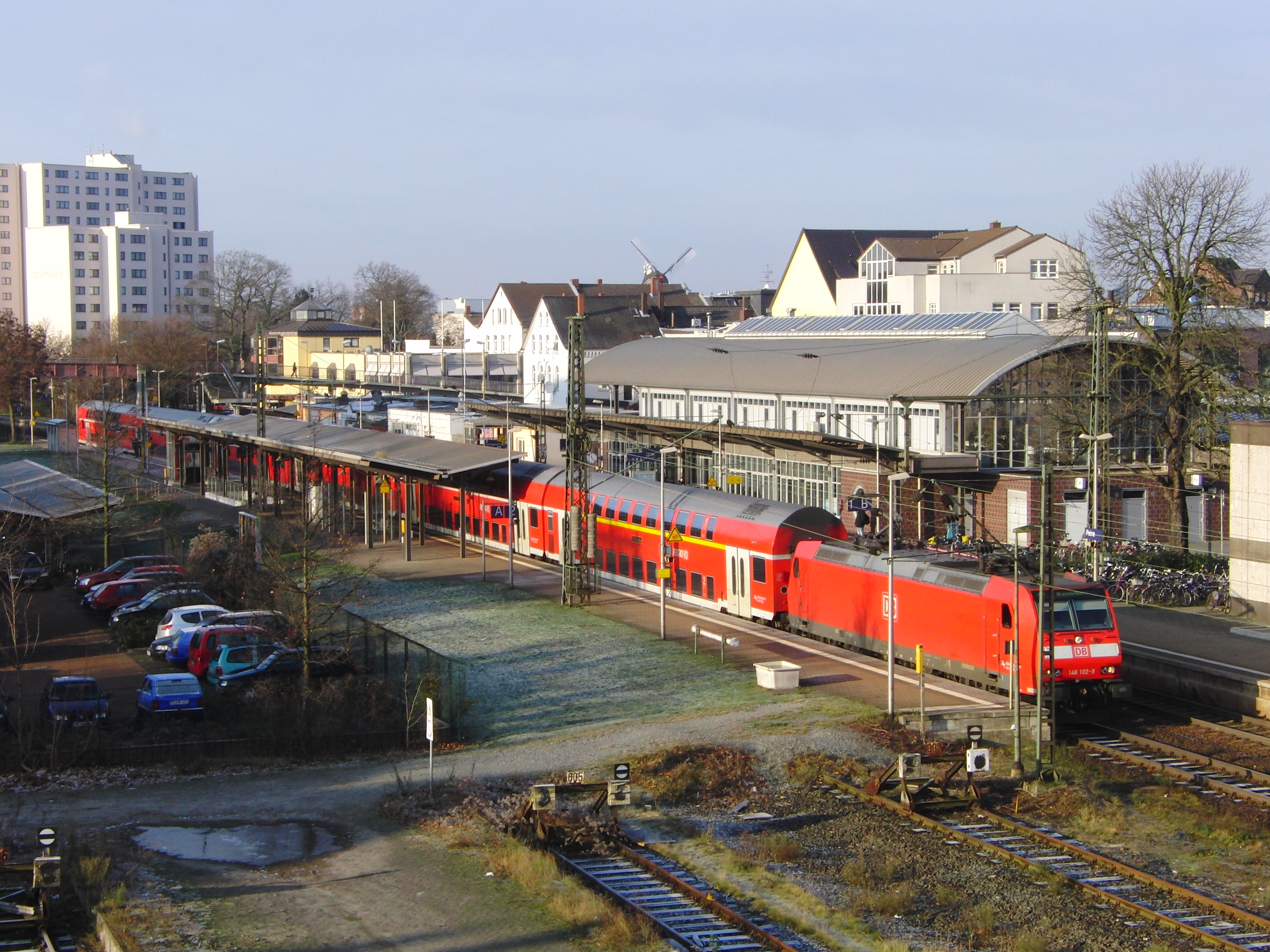
- Peine railway station

General information
- Location: Peine, Lower Saxony; Germany
- Coordinates: 52.319016°N 10.232139°E
- Line: Hanover–Brunswick railway
- Platforms: 2

Other information
- Station code: 4885
- Category: 5
- Fare zone: VRB: 50; GVH: D (VRB transitional tariff, monthly passes only)

Services
Preceding station	DB Fernverkehr	Following station
Hannover Hbf towards Emden Hbf	IC 56	Braunschweig Hbf towards Leipzig Hbf
Preceding station		Following station
Vöhrum towards Rheine	RE 60	Vechelde towards Braunschweig Hbf
Vöhrum towards Bielefeld Hbf	RE 70	Vechelde towards Braunschweig Hbf
Location

Peine (German: Bahnhof Peine) is a railway station located in Peine, Germany. The station is located on the Hanover–Brunswick railway. The train services are operated by WestfalenBahn.

== Train services ==
The station is served by the following service(s):

- Intercity services IC 56 Leipzig – Magdeburg – Braunschweig – Hanover – Bremen – Oldenburg – Emden
- Regional services RE 60 Rheine - Osnabrück - Minden - Hanover - Braunschweig
- Regional services RE 70 Bielefeld - Herford - Minden - Hanover - Braunschweig
