= Vöhrum station =

Railway station in Peine, Germany

Vöhrum (Peine)

General information
- Location: Vöhrum, Lower Saxony; Germany
- Coordinates: 52.2007°N 10.1008°E
- Line: Hanover–Brunswick railway
- Platforms: 2

Other information
- Station code: 6440
- Category: 6
- Fare zone: VRB: 50; GVH: D (VRB transitional tariff, monthly passes only)

Services
Preceding station		Following station
Hämelerwald towards Rheine	RE 60	Peine towards Braunschweig Hbf
Hämelerwald towards Bielefeld Hbf	RE 70	Peine towards Braunschweig Hbf
Location

Vöhrum (German: Bahnhof Vöhrum) is a railway station located in Vöhrum, Germany. The station is located on the Hanover–Brunswick railway. The train services are operated by WestfalenBahn.

== Train services ==
The station is served by the following service(s):

- Regional services RE 60 Rheine - Osnabrück - Minden - Hanover - Braunschweig
- Regional services RE 70 Bielefeld - Herford - Minden - Hanover - Braunschweig
