= Leese-Stolzenau station =

Railway station in Leese, Germany

Leese-Stolzenau
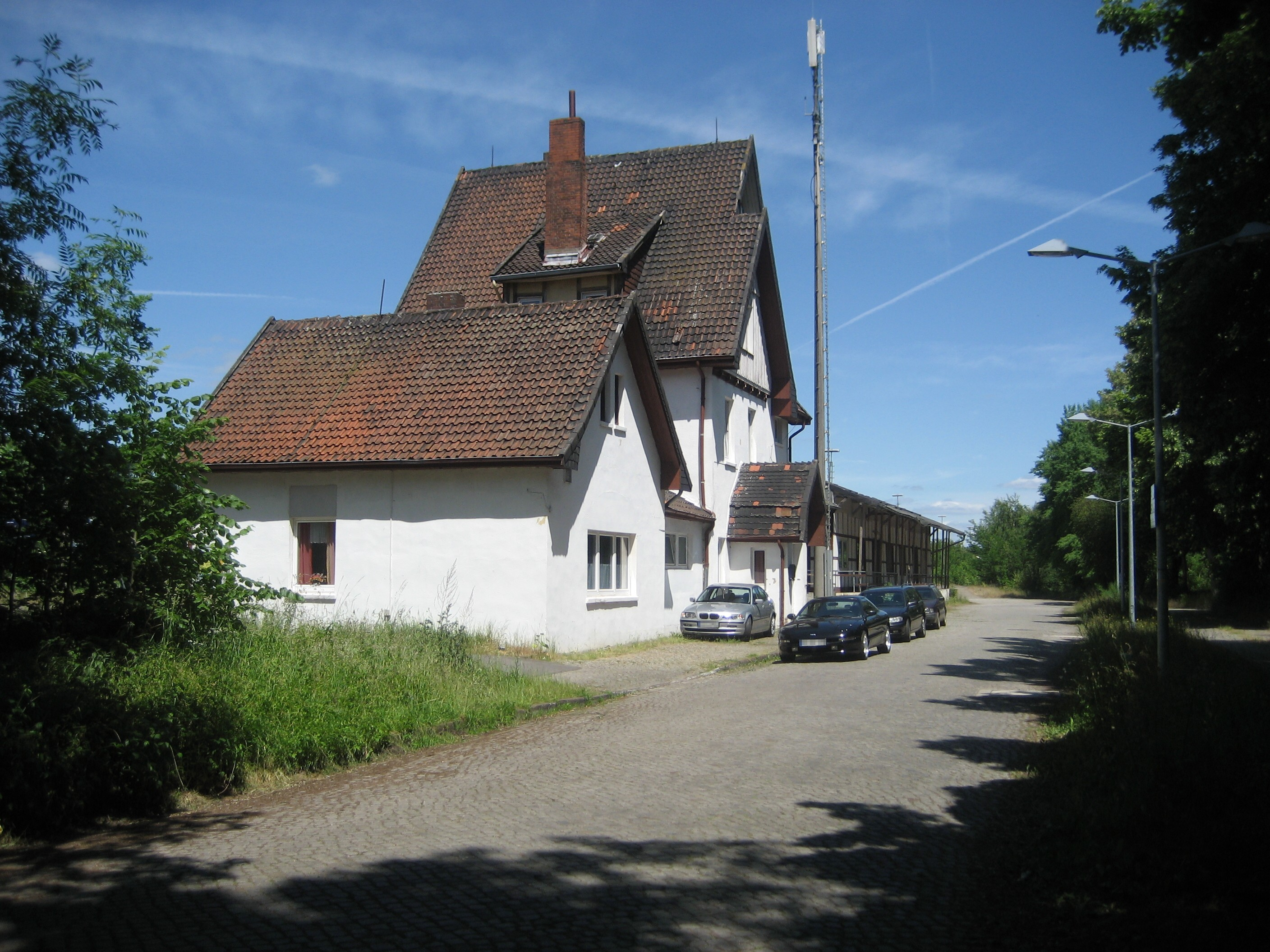
- Leese-Stolzenau railway station

General information
- Location: Leese, Lower Saxony; Germany
- Coordinates: 52.3034°N 9.0637°E
- System: Bf
- Line: Weser-Aller Railway
- Platforms: 1
- Tracks: 4

Other information
- Fare zone: VLN: 11 (buses only); GVH: F (VLN transitional tariff, monthly passes only)
Location

Leese-Stolzenau (German: Bahnhof Leese-Stolzenau) is a railway station located in Leese and near Stolzenau, Germany. The station is located on the Weser-Aller Railway. The train services are operated by Deutsche Bahn.

== Train services ==
The following services currently call at the station:

- Regional services RE 78 Nienburg - Minden - Bielefeld

| Preceding station | | Following station |
|---|---|---|
| Nienburg Terminus | RE 78 | Petershagen-Lahde towards Bielefeld Hbf |
