= Verden–Rotenburg railway =

Railway line in Germany

Verden – Rotenburg railway
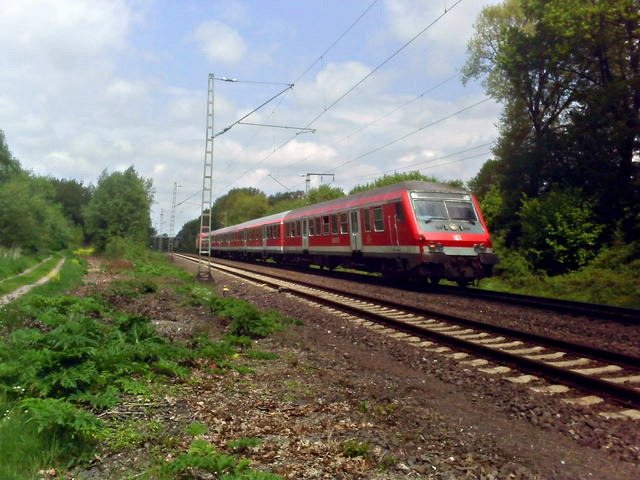
- A regional train on the Rotenburg–Verden railway.

Overview
- Line number: 1745
- Locale: Lower Saxony and North Rhine-Westphalia, Germany

Service
- Route number: 124

Technical
- Line length: 27.1 km (16.8 mi)
- Track gauge: 1,435 mm (4 ft 8 1/2 in) standard gauge
- Electrification: 15 kV/16.7 Hz AC overhead catenary
- Operating speed: 120

The Verden–Rotenburg railway is a single-track mainline in the German state of Lower Saxony, which connects Verden (Aller) station on the Wunstorf–Bremen railway with Rotenburg station on the Wanne-Eickel–Hamburg railway.

Together with the Nienburg–Minden railway, it represents the shortest direct connection between Hamburg and Ostwestfalen-Lippe with Bielefeld. It also serves as an important diversion route for the Intercity-Express and Intercity services on the Hanover–Hamburg railway. If the line between Verden and Bremen is closed, Regional-Express services are diverted via this line.

The Deutsche Reichsbahn opened the line in 1928.

== History ==
The Prussian state railways (Preußische Staatsbahn) received the concession for the construction of the line on 10 June 1914. Because of the First World War, however, it was not opened by Deutsche Reichsbahn until 1 July 1928.

Weekend passenger services were not reintroduced until 2001. After that the RB 76 (Rotenburg – Minden) services was used especially by travellers using the Schönes-Wochenende ("happy weekend") ticket (an excursion ticket that can be used on local services nationwide on weekends), because it has the shortest travel times between the Ruhr area and Hamburg using local services.

As a result of the reduction of the regionalisation funds, it was proposed that regional services would be discontinued in December 2007. This would have meant that the investment made a few years ago for the reopening and the enlargement of the Petershagen-Lahde station would have gone to waste, but the abolition of local services was averted. Due to the very low demand for through traffic, the operation of through services between Minden and Rotenburg was abandoned from Mondays to Fridays. The additional services that previously ran at the weekend, were cancelled without replacement. Although trains now have to be changed on the weekend in Verden and Nienburg, the change in Minden on trips to/from Bielefeld has been eliminated.

== Operations ==
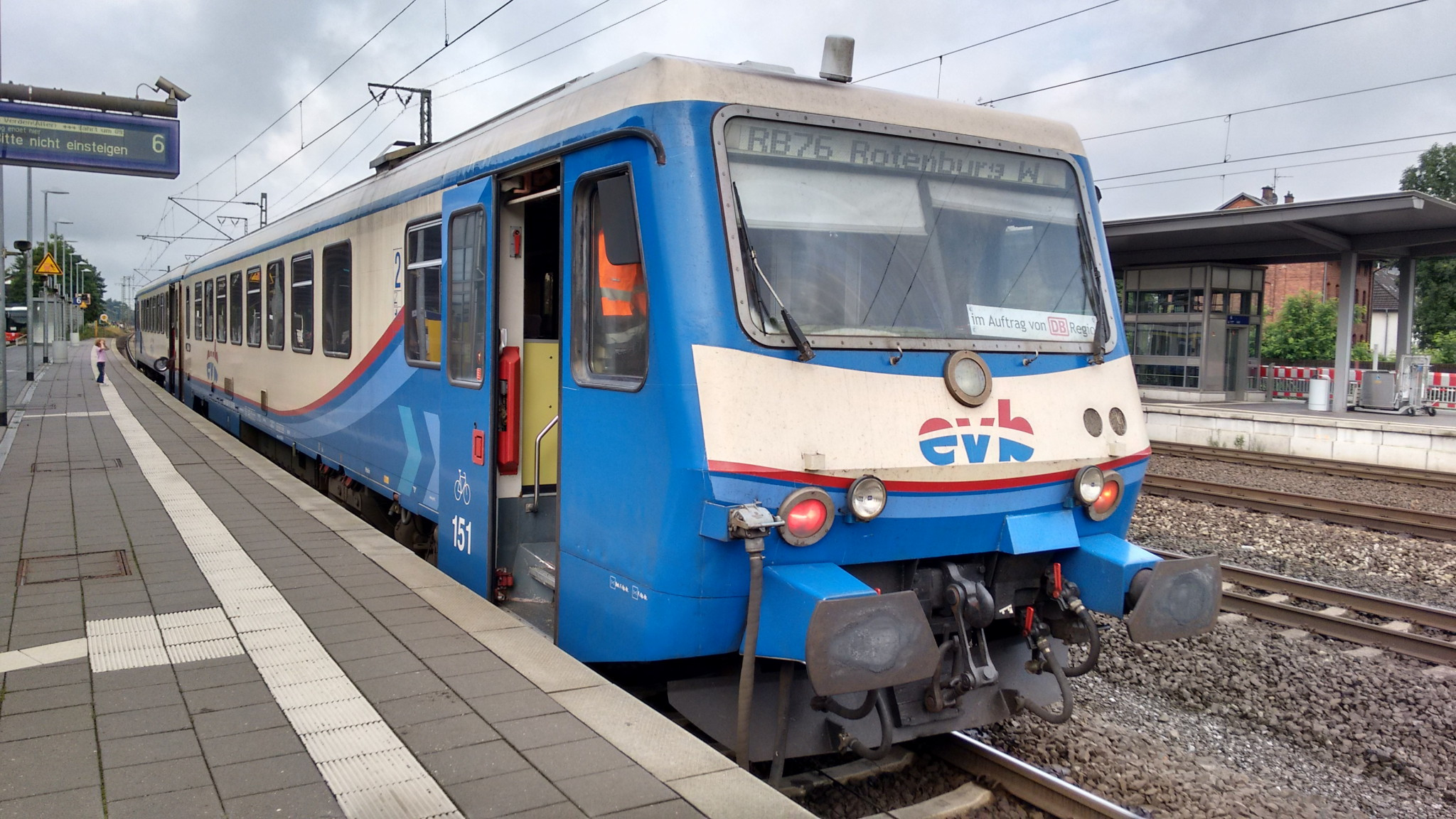
EVB diesel multiple unit 151 in Rotenburg (Wümme) as the RB 76 service from Verden to Rotenburg

=== Local services ===
The line lies in the area of the Verkehrsverbund Bremen/Niedersachsen (transport association of Bremen/Niedersachsen) and its fares apply. The journey takes 18 to 20 minutes.

==== Since 2017 ====
The Eisenbahnen und Verkehrsbetriebe Elbe-Weser operates the line on behalf of DB Regio Nord. The only rolling stock used is the pictured class 628 diesel multiple unit, although the track has long been electrified. In the peak hour, the line is served hourly during the peak from Monday to Friday and at other times every two hours. From Friday to Sunday there is also a train in the late evening.

In Rotenburg there is connection to the RE 4 from/to Hamburg Hauptbahnhof. In the early morning this runs as RB 41, which runs to a timetable slightly different from the regular-interval pattern, since the timetable is based on this connection.

In Verden there is connection to the RE 8 (along with the RE 1 in the peak) from/to Hannover Hbf and the RS 1 from/to Bremen. The RE 8 provides a connection in Nienburg from/to Bielefeld via Minden.

==== 2007–2017 ====
The route was served every two hours by Regionalbahn services of DB Regio Nord. The trains ran over the Rotenburg – Verden – Nienburg – Minden route. This line was in North Rhine-Westphalia as the RB 76 (Weser-Aller-Bahn). While the trains were well filled at the weekend (due to long-distance travelers with the Schönes-Wochenende ("happy weekend") ticket and the Niedersachsen-Ticket (Lower Saxony ticket)), there was less capacity during the week. The demand in 2008 was around 380 passengers per day during the week and around 950 passengers per day on Sunday. The very small number of passing passengers during the week meant that the line then only shuttled between Verden and Rotenburg.

Locomotives of class 111 or 143 with double-decker or Silberling (n-coaches) were used on the RB 76. Although the line was electrified long ago, electrically operated trains were only gradually introduced during the week in 2013. These usually consisted of a locomotive, a double-decker car and a double-decker control car, all old equipment. In the transitional period in the spring/summer of 2013, trains were also used that consisted only of a locomotive and double-decker control car. Since the timetable change in 2014/15, the Eisenbahnen und Verkehrsbetriebe Elbe-Weser (evb) have been contracted to operate this line with class 628 sets. At the weekend, the evb operated coupled sets alternately with the trains of DB Regio as the RE 78 service.

=== Freight traffic ===
The most important rail freight traffic over the line runs from Maschen marshalling yard via Seelze marshalling yard (near Hanover) to south Germany as well as via Minden to the Ruhr.
