= Hämelerwald station =

Railway station in Lehrte, Germany

Hämelerwald
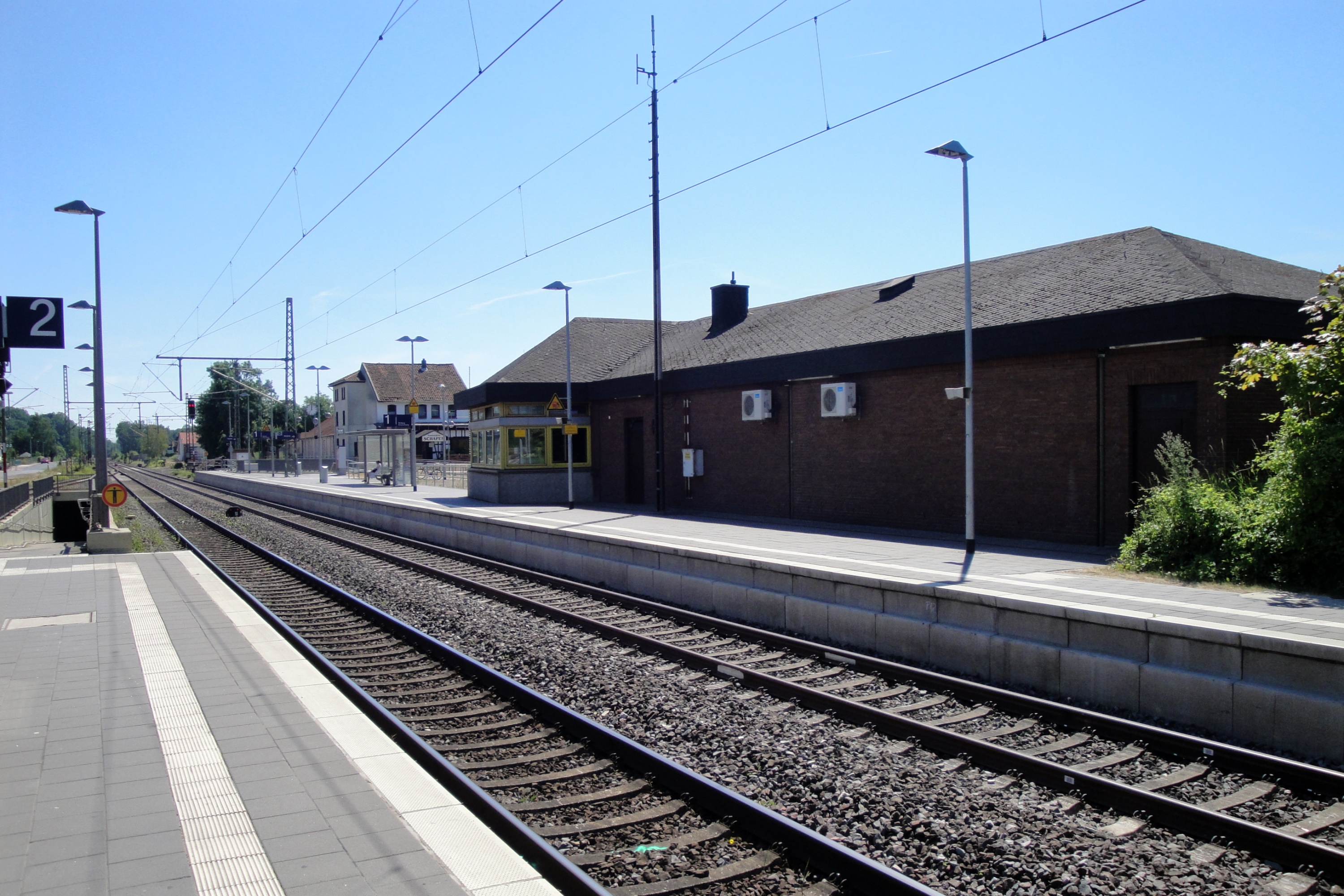
- Hämelerwald railway station

General information
- Location: Hämelerwald, Lower Saxony; Germany
- Coordinates: 52.2117°N 10.0636°E
- Line: Hanover–Brunswick railway
- Platforms: 3

Other information
- Station code: 2524
- Category: 5
- Fare zone: GVH: C; VRB: 55 (GVH transitional tariff)

Services
Preceding station		Following station
Lehrte towards Rheine	RE 60	Vöhrum towards Braunschweig Hbf
Lehrte towards Bielefeld Hbf	RE 70	Vöhrum towards Braunschweig Hbf
Location

Hämelerwald (German: Bahnhof Hämelerwald) is a railway station located in Hämelerwald, Germany. The station is located on the Hanover–Brunswick railway. The train services are operated by WestfalenBahn.

== Train services ==
The station is served by the following service(s):

- Regional services RE 60 Rheine - Osnabrück - Minden - Hanover - Braunschweig
- Regional services RE 70 Bielefeld - Herford - Minden - Hanover - Braunschweig
