= Porta Westfalica station =

Railway station in Porta Westfalica, Germany

Porta Westfalica
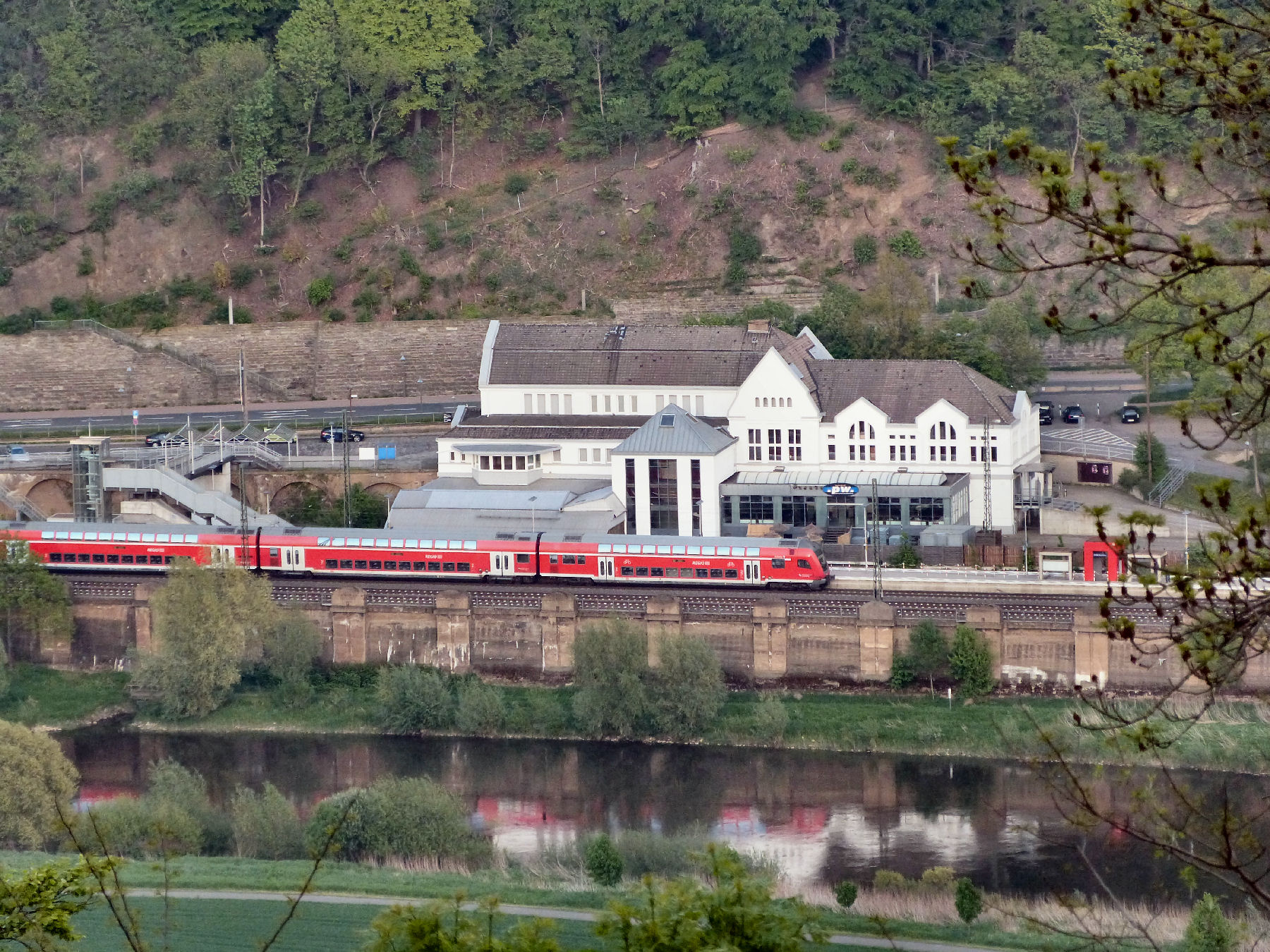

General information
- Location: Platte Weide 2, Porta Westfalica, NRW; Germany
- Coordinates: 52°14′35″N 8°55′14″E
- Lines: Hamm–Minden (KBS 370, KBS 375)
- Platforms: 2

Construction
- Accessible: Yes

Other information
- Station code: 4998
- DS100 code: HPTA
- Category: 4
- Fare zone: Westfalentarif: 63821
- Website: www.bahnhof.de

History
- Opened: 1847; 1913–16
Services
Preceding station	National Express Germany	Following station
Bad Oeynhausen towards Cologne/Bonn Airport	RE 6 (Rhein-Weser-Express)	Minden Terminus
Preceding station		Following station
Bad Oeynhausen towards Bielefeld Hbf	RE 78	Minden towards Nienburg (Weser)
Preceding station		Following station
Bad Oeynhausen towards Rheine	RE 60	Minden towards Braunschweig Hbf
Bad Oeynhausen towards Bielefeld Hbf	RE 70	Minden towards Braunschweig Hbf
Location

Porta Westfalica is a railway station located in Porta Westfalica, Germany. The original station was opened in 1847 and the current station was completed in 1916. It is located on the Hamm–Minden railway. The train services are operated by Deutsche Bahn and WestfalenBahn.

== Train services ==
The station is served by the following services:

- Regional services RE 6 Minden – Porta Westfalica – Herford – Bielefeld – Hamm – Dortmund – Essen – Duisburg – Düsseldorf Airport – Düsseldorf – Neuss – Cologne – Cologne/Bonn Airport
- Regional services RE 60 Rheine - Osnabrück - Minden - Hanover - Braunschweig
- Regional services RE 70 Bielefeld - Herford - Minden - Hanover - Braunschweig
- Regional services RE 78 Bielefeld - Herford - Minden - Nienburg
