= Vechelde station =

Railway station in Vechelde, Germany

Vechelde

General information
- Location: Vechelde, Lower Saxony; Germany
- Coordinates: 52.257907°N 10.359024°E
- Line: Hanover–Brunswick railway
- Platforms: 2

Other information
- Station code: 6397
- Category: 5
- Fare zone: VRB: 53

Services
Preceding station		Following station
Peine towards Rheine	RE 60	Braunschweig Hbf Terminus
Peine towards Bielefeld Hbf	RE 70	Braunschweig Hbf Terminus
Location

Vechelde (German: Bahnhof Vechelde) is a railway station located in Vechelde, Germany. The station is located on the Hanover–Brunswick railway. The train services are operated by WestfalenBahn.

== Train services ==
The station is served by the following service(s):

- Regional services RE 60 Rheine - Osnabrück - Minden - Hanover - Braunschweig
- Regional services RE 70 Bielefeld - Minden - Hanover - Braunschweig
