= Hagen (Han) station =

Railway station in Neustadt am Rübenberge, Germany

Hagen (Han)
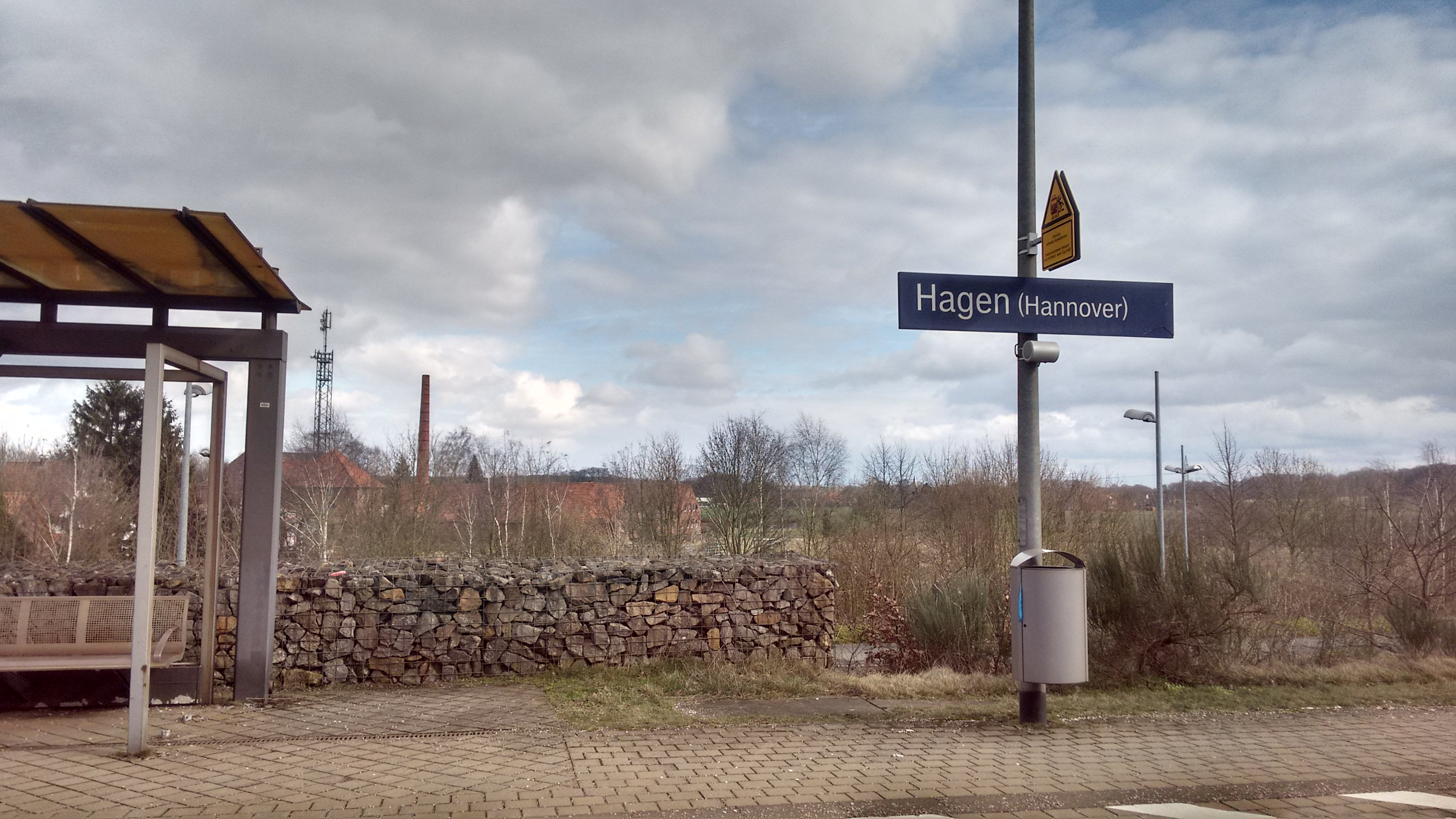
- The station platform in 2017

General information
- Location: Neustadt am Rübenberge, Lower Saxony; Germany
- Coordinates: 52°34′26″N 9°24′31″E
- Owner: Deutsche Bahn
- Lines: Wunstorf–Bremen (KBS 380)
- Distance: 39.6 km (24.6 mi) from Hannover
- Platforms: 2 side platforms
- Tracks: 2
- Train operators: Transdev Hannover

Other information
- Station code: 2456
- DS100 code: RH
- IBNR: 8013730
- Category: 6
- Fare zone: C (Üstra)

Services
Preceding station	Hanover S-Bahn	Following station
Linsburg towards Nienburg (Weser)	S 2	Eilvese towards Haste (Han)
Location

Hagen (Han) station (German: Bahnhof Hagen (Han)) is a railway station located in Hagen, part of Neustadt am Rübenberge, Germany. The station is located on the Wunstorf–Bremen railway line. The train services are operated by Transdev Hannover as part of the Hanover S-Bahn. Hagen (Han) is served by the S2.

== Services ==
As of the April 2025 timetable change, the following services stop at Hagen (Han):

- S 2: hourly service between Nienburg (Weser) and Haste (Han)
