= Tostedt station =

Railway station in Tostedt, Germany

Tostedt
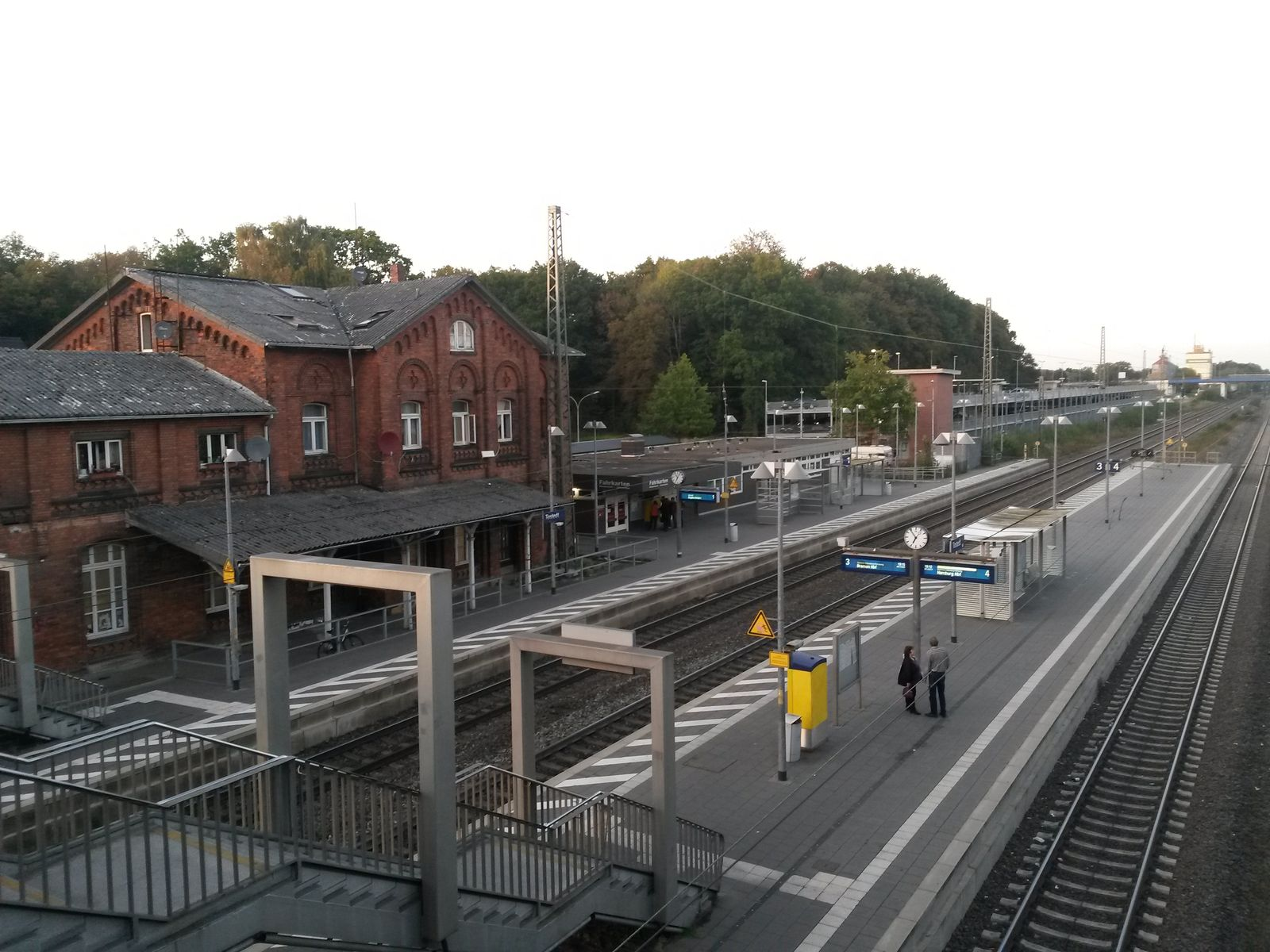
- Tostedt railway station

General information
- Location: Tostedt, Lower Saxony; Germany
- Coordinates: 53.1618°N 9.4355°E
- Owner: DB Netz
- Operator: DB Station&Service
- Lines: Wanne-Eickel–Hamburg railway Wilstedt-Zeven-Tostedt railway
- Platforms: 1 island platform 1 side platform
- Tracks: 4
- Train operators: Metronom

Other information
- Station code: 6231
- Category: 4
- Fare zone: HVV: E/808
- Website: www.bahnhof.de

Services
| Preceding station | Metronom | Following station |
|---|---|---|
| Rotenburg towards Bremen Hbf | RE 4 | Buchholz (Nordheide) towards Hamburg Hbf |
| Lauenbrück towards Bremen Hbf | RB 41 | Sprötze towards Hamburg Hbf |
Location
- Location within Lower Saxony

Tostedt (German: Bahnhof Tostedt) is a railway station located in Tostedt, Germany. The station is located on the Wanne-Eickel–Hamburg railway and Wilstedt-Zeven-Tostedt railway. The train services are operated by Metronom.

== Train services ==
The following services currently call at the station:

- Regional services RE 4 Bremen - Rotenburg - Tostedt - Buchholz - Hamburg
- Local services RB 41 Bremen - Rotenburg - Tostedt - Buchholz - Hamburg
