= Minden (Westfalen) station =

Railway station in Minden, Germany

Minden (Westf)
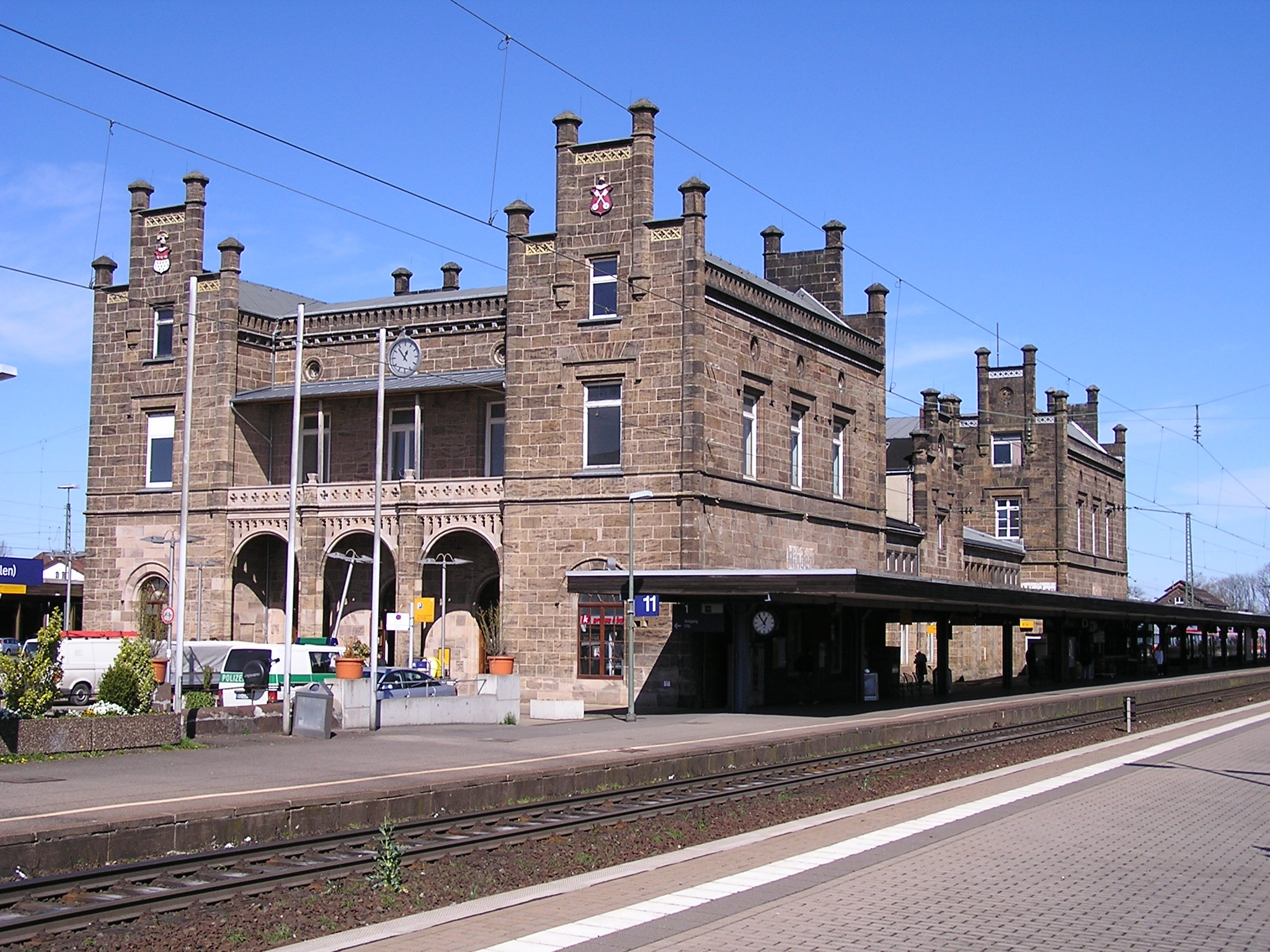
- Station

General information
- Location: Bundesbahnhof 12, Minden, NRW; Germany
- Coordinates: 52°17′26″N 8°56′04″E
- Lines: Hanover–Minden (KBS 370); Hamm–Minden (KBS 370/KBS 400); Verden–Rotenburg (KBS 124)
- Platforms: 5

Construction
- Accessible: Yes
- Architect: Schelle

Other information
- Station code: 5085
- DS100 code: HM
- IBNR: 8000252
- Category: 3
- Fare zone: Westfalentarif: 63001
- Website: www.bahnhof.de

History
- Opened: 1848
Services
Preceding station	DB Fernverkehr	Following station
Herford towards Köln Hbf	ICE 10	Hannover Hbf towards Berlin Ostbahnhof
Bad Oeynhausen towards Stuttgart Hbf or Tübingen Hbf	IC 55	Hannover Hbf towards Dresden Hbf
Preceding station	National Express Germany	Following station
Porta Westfalica towards Cologne/Bonn Airport	RE 6 (Rhein-Weser-Express)	Terminus
Preceding station		Following station
Porta Westfalica towards Rheine	RE 60	Bückeburg towards Braunschweig Hbf
Porta Westfalica towards Bielefeld Hbf	RE 70	Bückeburg towards Braunschweig Hbf
Preceding station		Following station
Porta Westfalica towards Bielefeld Hbf	RE 78	Petershagen-Lahde towards Nienburg (Weser)
Preceding station	Hanover S-Bahn	Following station
Terminus	S 1	Bückeburg towards Haste (Han)
Location
- Location within North Rhine-Westphalia Location within Germany Location within Europe

Minden (Westfalen) station (officially Minden (Westf) Bf) is a railway station in Minden. The station is located on the Hanover–Minden railway to Hanover, the Hamm–Minden railway to Hamm and the Verden–Rotenburg railway to Rotenburg an der Wümme. The train services are operated by Deutsche Bahn and WestfalenBahn. The station is also served by the Hanover S-Bahn.

== History ==
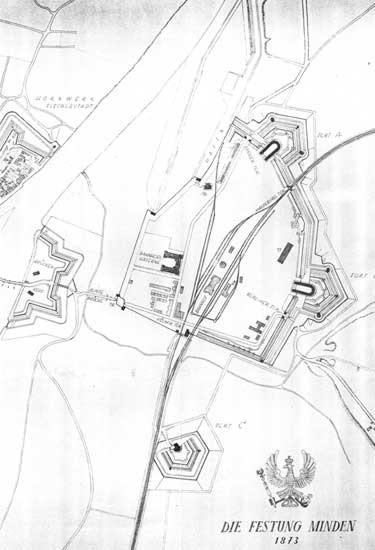
Original fortifications around station

The station was opened in 1848 as the terminus of the trunk line of the Cologne–Minden Railway Company (CME), connecting with the Royal Hanoverian State Railways’ Hannover–Minden line. South of Minden the Cologne–Minden line passes through the gap created at Porta Westfalica by the Weser river between the Weser and Wiehen Hills. The geography made it difficult to build the railway on the western side of the river through the gap to a station near Minden and then cross the river to continue to the east. Instead it was decided to cross the river at Rehme (near Bad Oeynhausen), continuing north on the eastern bank through the gap, which was widened with explosives and then along a levee to a station built on the eastern bank of the river. Both lines were completed on 15 October 1847. As it was a border station on one of the major routes for east–west traffic, it was originally highly fortified. In 1866 the Kingdom of Hanover was annexed by Prussia, allowing the railway to operate continuously from Berlin to Cologne without frontiers. The fortifications around the station were abandoned in 1873.

At the beginning of the 20th century further railway connections were added in the form of the Minden District Railway and the Bad Eilsen Light Railway. In 1921 the Verden–Rotenburg railway was built, providing a connection to the north towards Bremen. A freight station was later added and Minden station was connected to a railway to the river port. In 1950 the Bundesbahn Central Office, which was responsible for technological development and the procurement of rail vehicles and infrastructure was relocated to Minden, although some of these activities were also carried out in Munich.

== Station building ==
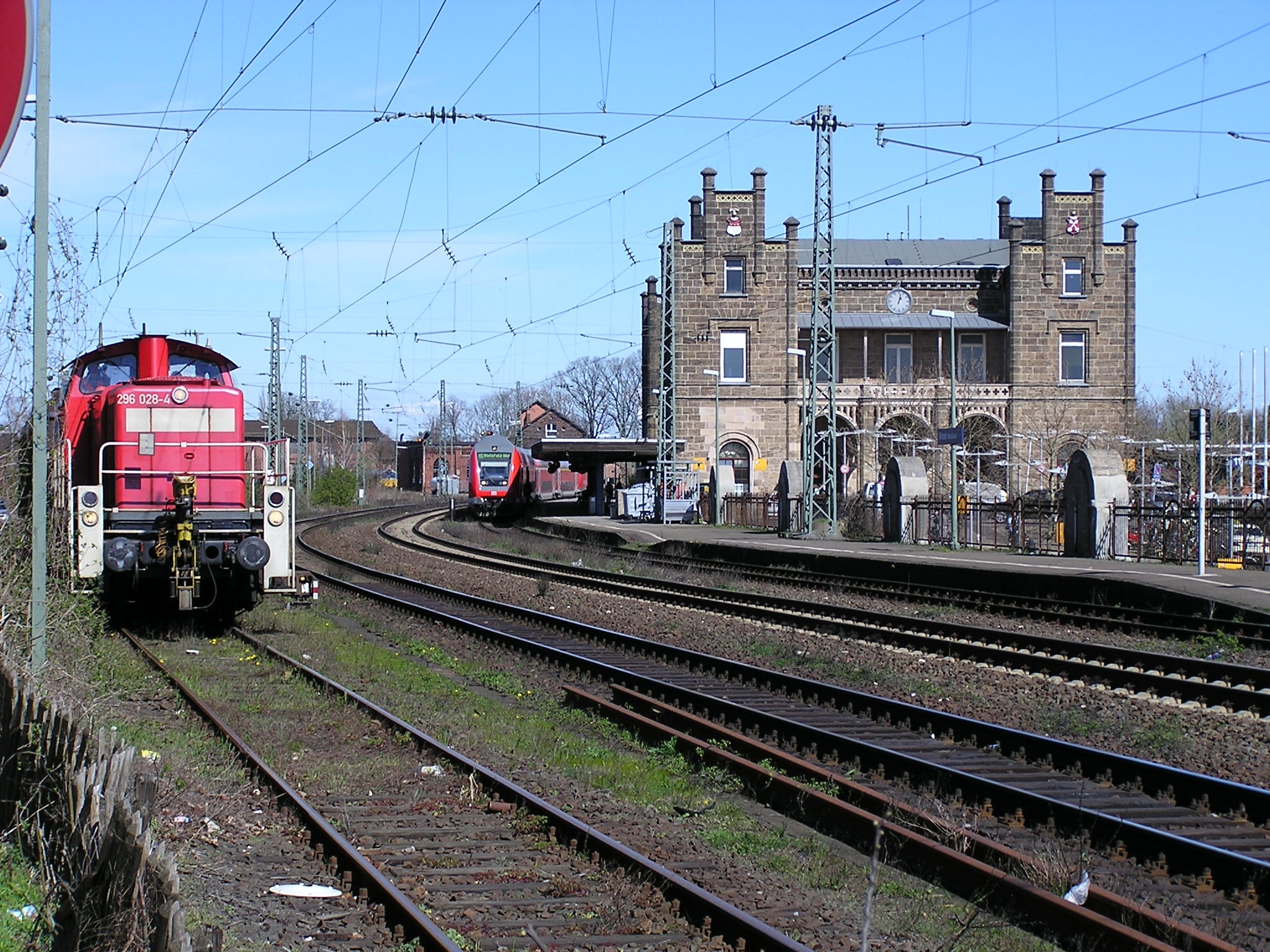
The station and connecting railway lines

The Cologne-Minden Railway Company's station and reception building was built to the design of the royal building inspector Schelle and was completed in 1848 after the start of railway operations on 15 October 1847. It was built in the romantic style, with features based on medieval towers and battlements, a style which was used at this time for many stations in Westphalia. The Minden station is one of the few remaining stations in this style.

The station was designed as a transfer station between the Cologne-Minden and the Royal Hanoverian State railways. This function was no longer required after the absorption of Hanover by Prussia, so the station always showed plenty of space and could accommodate new, larger traffic flows smoothly and without further modification. The facade of Minden station has three parts. The building is divided into two identical-looking end buildings, which are connected by a single-storey central section with a ticket office and baggage-handling facilities. Originally, there were customs facilities and first, second, third and fourth class waiting rooms. In addition, it houses a restaurant and bar.

The Cologne-Minden Railway built its lines and its maintenance facilities on the southern and western side of the station while the Royal Hanoverian State Railways built its lines and its maintenance facilities on the eastern side, turning the station into an "island" station.

The station was opened in 1847 is located on the Rheine to Löhne railway and the Hamm to Minden railway. The train services are operated by Deutsche Bahn.

== Train services ==
The station is served by the following services:

Line	Route	Frequency
ICE 10	Berlin East – Berlin – Hanover – Minden – Bielefeld – Hamm – Dortmund – Essen – Duisburg – Düsseldorf – Cologne	Every 2 hours
IC 55; ICE 55	Dresden – Leipzig – Magdeburg – Braunschweig – Hanover – Minden – Bad Oeynhausen – Herford – Bielefeld – Gütersloh – Hamm – Wuppertal – Cologne – Bonn – Koblenz – Mainz – Mannheim – Heidelberg – Stuttgart	Every 2 hours
RE 6	Minden – Bad Oeynhausen – Herford – Bielefeld – Hamm – Dortmund – Essen – Duisburg – Düsseldorf Airport – Düsseldorf – Neuss – Cologne – Cologne/Bonn Airport	Hourly
RE 60	Rheine – Osnabrück – Bad Oeynhausen – Minden – Hanover – Braunschweig	Every 2 hours
RE 70	Bielefeld – Herford – Bad Oeynhausen – Minden – Hanover – Braunschweig	Every 2 hours
RE 78	Bielefeld – Herford – Bad Oeynhausen – Minden – Nienburg	Every 2 hours
S 1	Minden - Haste - Wunstorf - Hanover - Weetzen - Haste	Hourly
