= Linsburg station =

Railway station in Linsburg, Germany

Linsburg
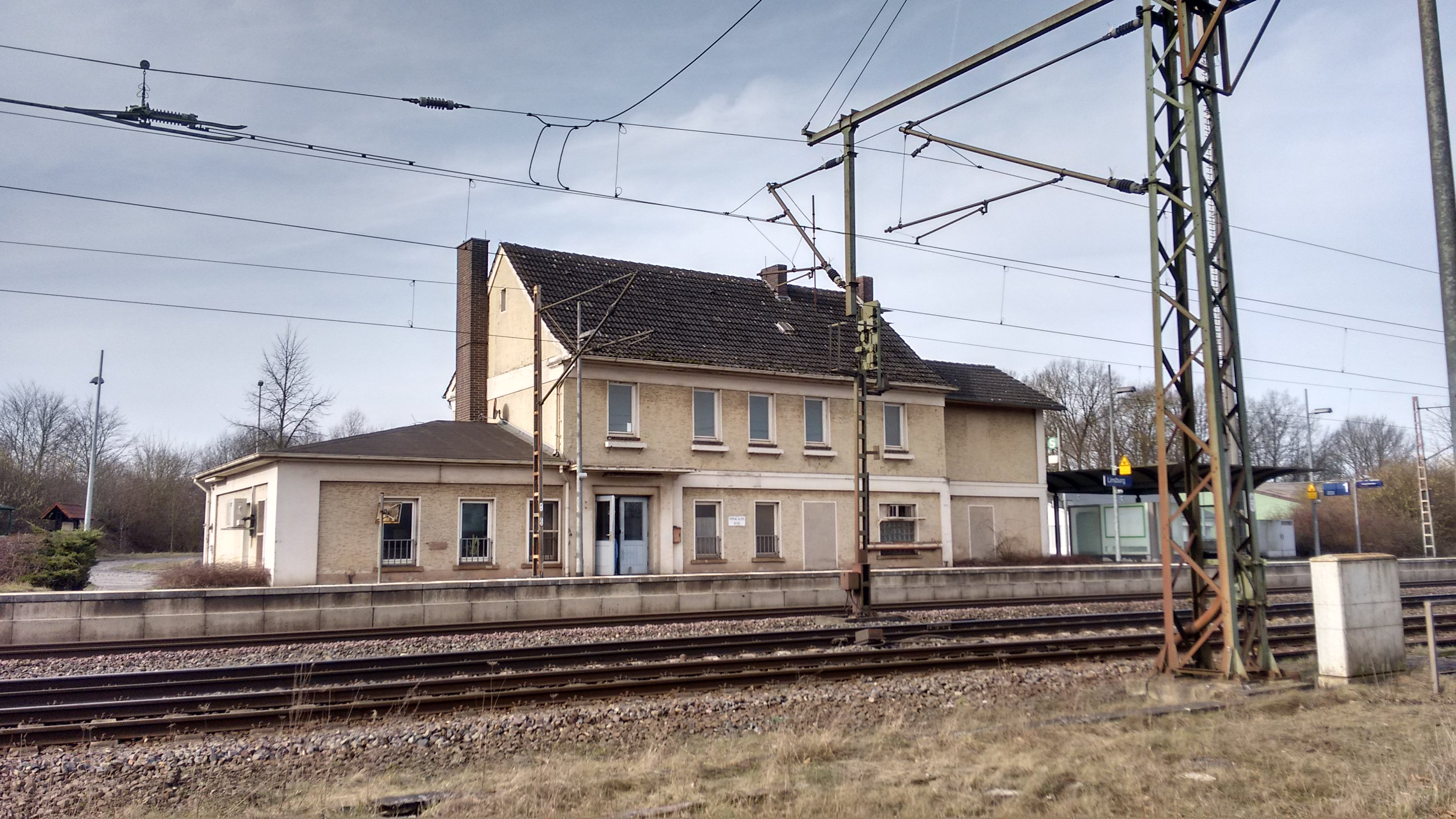
- The station building in 2017

General information
- Location: Linsburg, Lower Saxony; Germany
- Coordinates: 52°36′04″N 9°19′34″E
- Owner: Deutsche Bahn
- Lines: Wunstorf–Bremen (KBS 380)
- Distance: 46.2 km (28.7 mi) from Hannover
- Platforms: 2 side platforms
- Tracks: 2
- Train operators: Transdev Hannover

Other information
- Station code: 3743
- DS100 code: HLBU
- IBNR: 8003705
- Category: 6
- Fare zone: E (Üstra)

Services
Preceding station	Hanover S-Bahn	Following station
Nienburg (Weser) Terminus	S 2	Hagen (Han) towards Haste (Han)
Location

Linsburg station (German: Bahnhof Linsburg) is a railway station located in Linsburg, Germany. The station is located on the Wunstorf–Bremen railway line. The train services are operated by Transdev Hannover as part of the Hanover S-Bahn. Linsburg is served by the S2.

== Services ==
As of the April 2025 timetable change, the following services stop at Linsburg:

- S 2: hourly service between Nienburg (Weser) and Haste (Han)
