= Nienburg–Minden railway =

Railway line in Germany

Overview
- Line number: 1741
- Locale: Lower Saxony and North Rhine-Westphalia, Germany

Service
- Route number: 124

Technical
- Line length: 53.0 km (32.9 mi)
- Track gauge: 1,435 mm (4 ft 8 1/2 in) standard gauge
- Electrification: 15 kV/16.7 Hz AC overhead catenary

The Nienburg–Minden railway is a single track branch line in Lower Saxony and North Rhine-Westphalia, which connects Nienburg station on the Wunstorf–Bremen railway with Minden station on the Hamm–Minden railway. The most important traffic of the line is the freight running from the marshalling yard at Hamburg to the Ruhr and on to southern Germany as well as the container traffic from the seaports to the hinterland. It is sometimes called the Natobahn (NATO railway) because of its former military importance.

== History ==
The line was opened in 1921. All stations on the line were served in the 1944 timetable.

Weekend traffic was reintroduced in 2001. After that the RB 76 service (Minden–Rotenburg on the Wanne-Eickel–Hamburg railway) was used especially by travellers using the Schönes-Wochenende ("happy weekend") ticket (an excursion ticket that can be used on local services nationwide on weekends), because it has the shortest travel times between the Ruhr area and Hamburg using local services.

As a result of the reduction of the regionalisation funds, it was proposed that regional services would be discontinued in December 2007. This would have meant that the investment made a few years ago for the reopening and the enlargement of the Petershagen-Lahde station would have gone to waste, but the abolition of local services was averted. Due to the very low demand for through traffic, the operation of through services between Minden and Rotenburg was abandoned from Mondays to Fridays. Since then the line has been served by the RE 78 (Nienburg–Bielefeld) service.

With the introduction of the new service in 2007, class 644 (Bombardier Talent) diesel multiple units were originally used; these had previously also been used on Bielefeld–Minden shuttle services. In 2009, they were replaced by class 425 and 426 electric multiple units and occasionally supplemented by double-decker trains in the evening. Due to a lack of class 426 rolling stock, all trains were formed from class 111 electric locomotives hauling two double-decker cars of the 1994 series from February 2017 until the December 2017 timetable change.

Services on the weekend, ran at two-hour intervals (compared to the approximately hourly services on working days) as the RB 76 (Minden–Rotenburg) service. This was formerly operated by DB Regio Nord with locomotive-hauled trains. It consisted of locomotives of classes 141, 111 or 143 with double-deck or Silberling carriages. Since the end of 2014, the EVB has operated the services on behalf of DB Regio Nord with class 628 diesel railcars with coupled sets (trains numbers up to 14141). The other service running on the line is operated by DB from Monday to Friday (train numbers from 14183). There were important connections in Minden to the RE 6 service to the Cologne/Bonn Airport and in Rotenburg to the RE 4 service to Hamburg, operated by Metronom.

== Operations ==
There are no long-distance passenger services on this line.

=== Local services ===
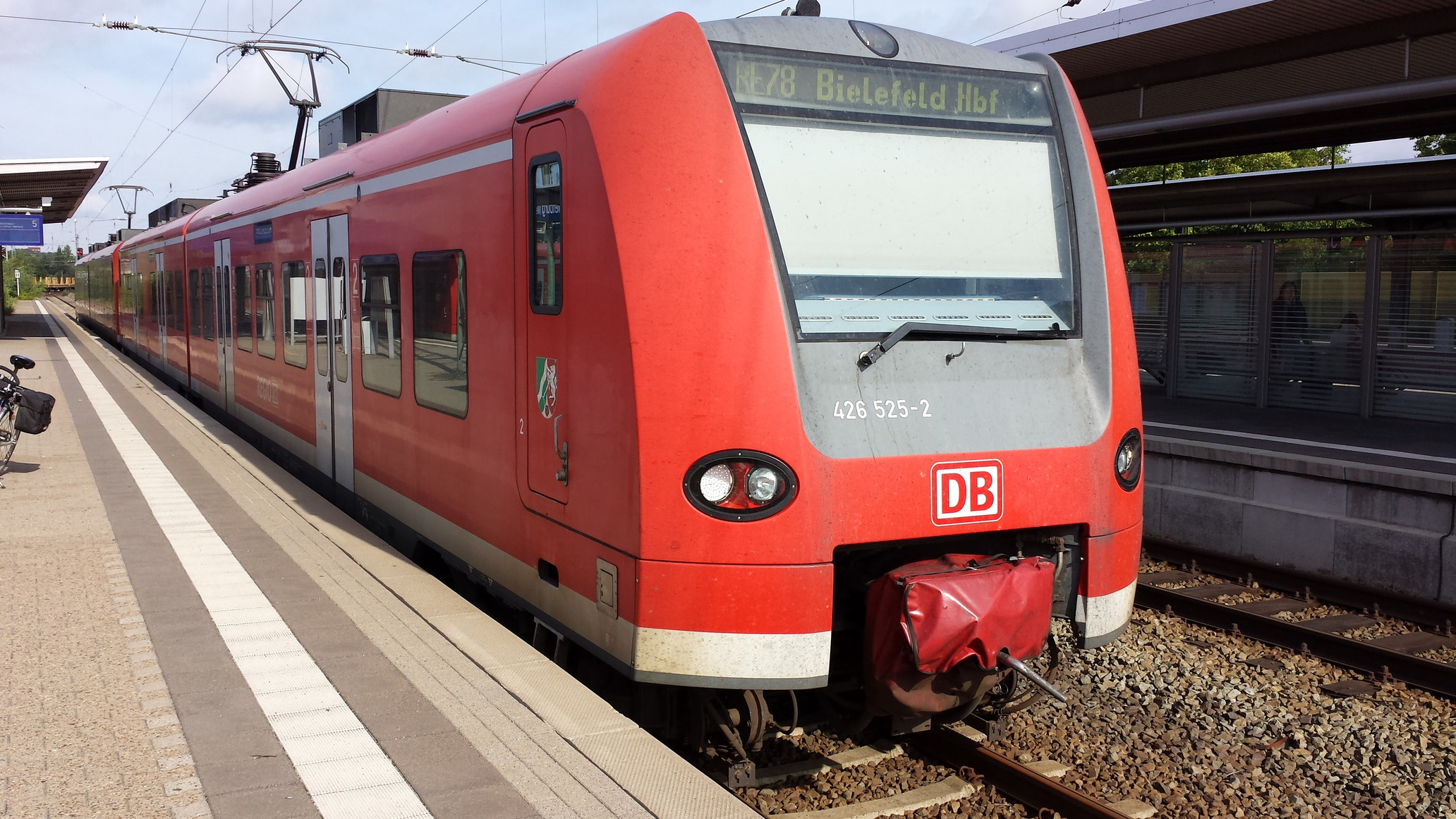
DB 426 025 running as RE78 from Nienburg to Bielefeld in Nienburg station

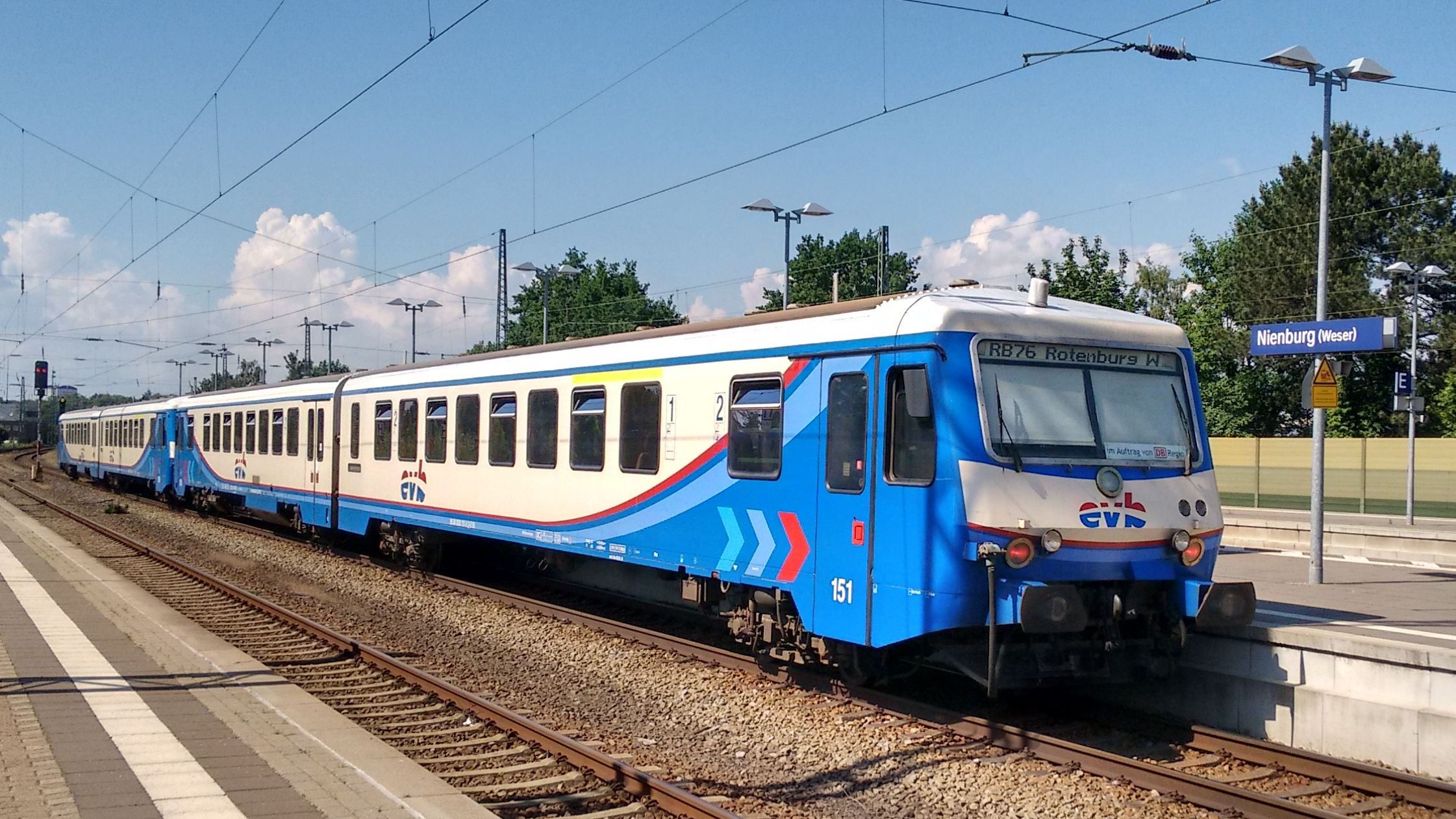
EVB diesel multiple unit 151 running as RB76 from Minden to Rotenburg in Nienburg station

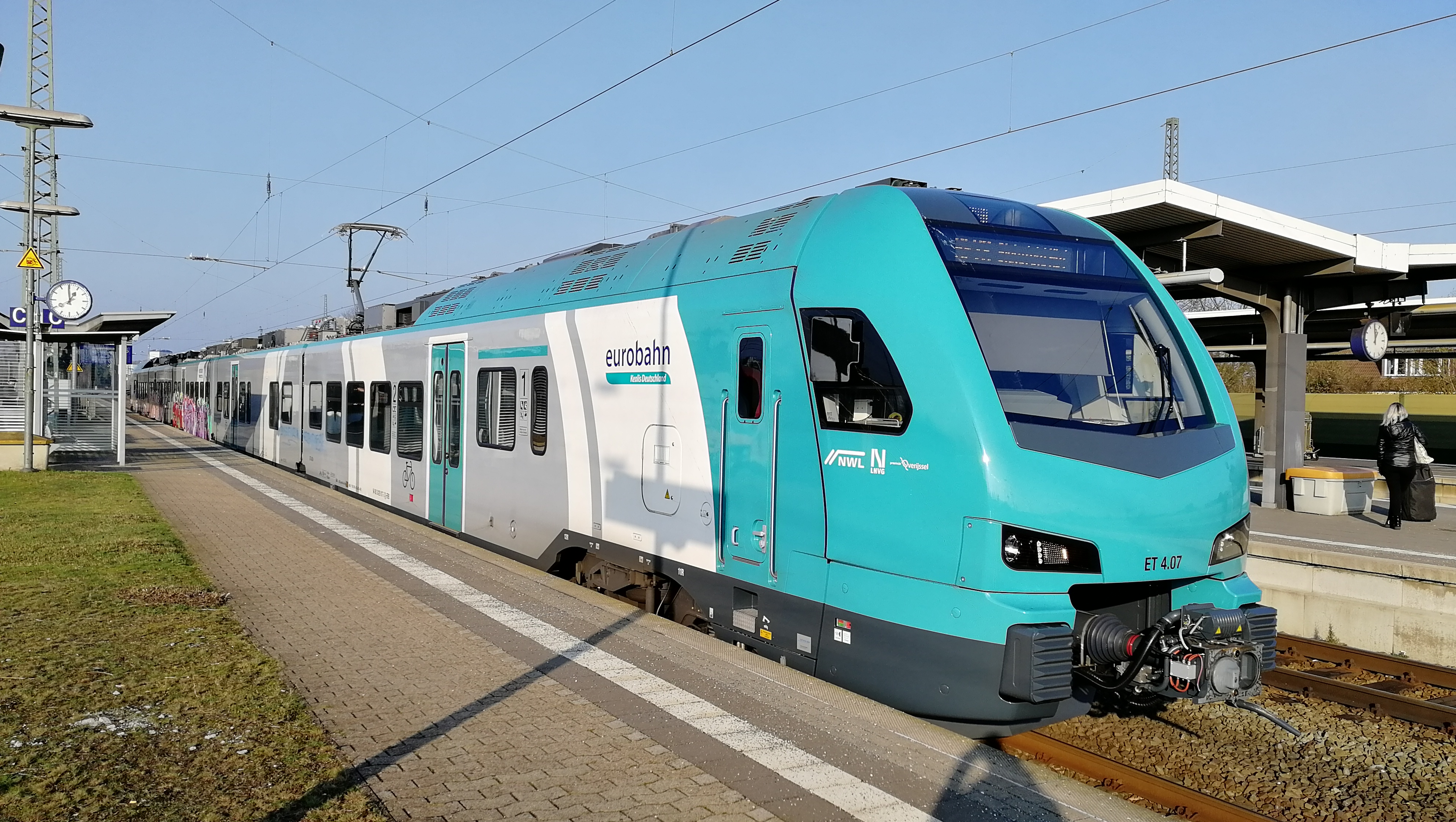
Eurobahn ET 4.07 set as RE78 from Nienburg to Bielefeld Hbf in Nienburg station

The line has been served every two hours every day by the Porta-Express (RE 78: Nienburg–Bielefeld) since the 2017/18 timetable change. Previously, this only ran on this line on weekdays, while on the weekend, it ran on the Minden–Nienburg–Verden–Rotenburg (Wümme) route. It is operated with four-part Stadler FLIRT (class 429) diesel multiple units that are owned by eurobahn. The rolling stock that has been used since mid-January originally belonged to Westfalenbahn and still ran in its livery in March 2018. The first train runs to Bielefeld at 7:09 from Nienburg and in the opposite direction at 05:24 from Bielefeld. Both do not run on Sundays. The last trains depart at 21:09 from Nienburg and at 19:24 from Bielefeld; both timings are new since Eurobahn took over. The train from Minden at 8:01 starts, except on Sundays, in Rheda-Wiedenbrück at 7:04. In Nienburg, there is a direct connection to the Regional-Express service RE8 from/to Bremerhaven-Lehe via Bremen. There are some additional RE 78 services, that run only between Minden and Bielefeld.

The average speed on the Minden–Nienburg section is 66 km/h and the maximum speed is 80 km/h.

=== Freight ===
Freight traffic runs on the line, including to the Heyden Power Station in Petershagen. Train can only cross on the otherwise single track only in Leese-Stolzenau and to the south of Nienburg.

== Operational features ==
The line was still notable (as of 2013) in operational and railway technical terms because it is consistently equipped with mechanical safety technology, including semaphore signals. A number of abandoned stations are still recognisable on the basis of abandoned platform edges, characteristic entrance buildings with historical addresses and old freight loading facilities. The unrestricted level crossings are still only protected by the sounding of warning sirens.
