= Rotenburg station =

Railway station in Rotenburg an der Wümme, Germany

Rotenburg (Wümme)
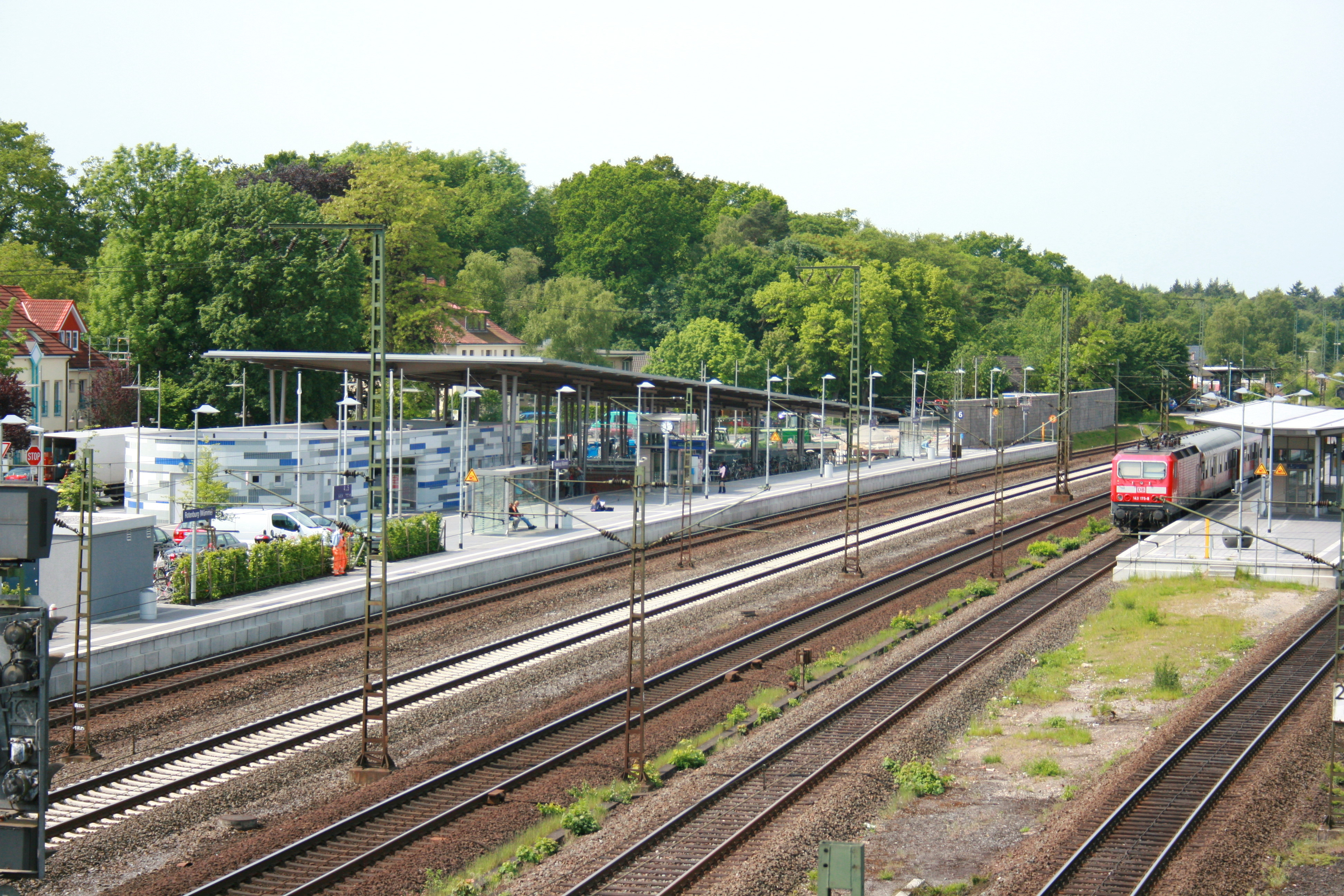
- Rotenburg railway station

General information
- Location: Rotenburg an der Wümme, Lower Saxony; Germany
- Coordinates: 53.0645°N 9.2326°E
- Owner: DB Netz
- Operator: DB Station&Service
- Lines: Wanne-Eickel–Hamburg railway; Bremervörde–Walsrode railway; Verden–Rotenburg railway
- Platforms: 3
- Train operators: NordWestBahn; Metronom

Construction
- Accessible: Yes

Other information
- Station code: 5380
- DS100 code: AROG
- IBNR: 8000321
- Category: 4
- Fare zone: VBN: 340; HVV: G/1108 (VBN transitional tariff, season tickets only)
- Website: www.bahnhof.de

History
- Opened: 1874

Services
| Preceding station | Metronom | Following station |
|---|---|---|
| Bremen Hbf Terminus | RE 4 | Tostedt towards Hamburg Hbf |
| Sottrum towards Bremen Hbf | RB 41 | Scheeßel towards Hamburg Hbf |
| Preceding station | Bremen S-Bahn | Following station |
| Verden (Aller) Terminus | RS6 | Terminus |
Location
- Location within Lower Saxony

Rotenburg (German: Bahnhof Rotenburg (Wümme)) is a railway station located in Rotenburg an der Wümme, Germany. The station is located on the Wanne-Eickel–Hamburg railway, Bremervörde–Walsrode railway and Verden–Rotenburg railway. The train services are operated by Metronom and Eisenbahnen und Verkehrsbetriebe Elbe-Weser (EVB).

== Train services ==
The following services currently call at the station:

- Regional services RE 4 Bremen - Rotenburg - Tostedt - Buchholz - Hamburg
- Local services RB 41 Bremen - Rotenburg - Tostedt - Buchholz - Hamburg
- Bremen S-Bahn RS6 Rotenburg - Verden
