= Weser-Leine-Express =

Coordinates: 52.2388°N 8.9140°E

RE 70 Weser-Leine-Express
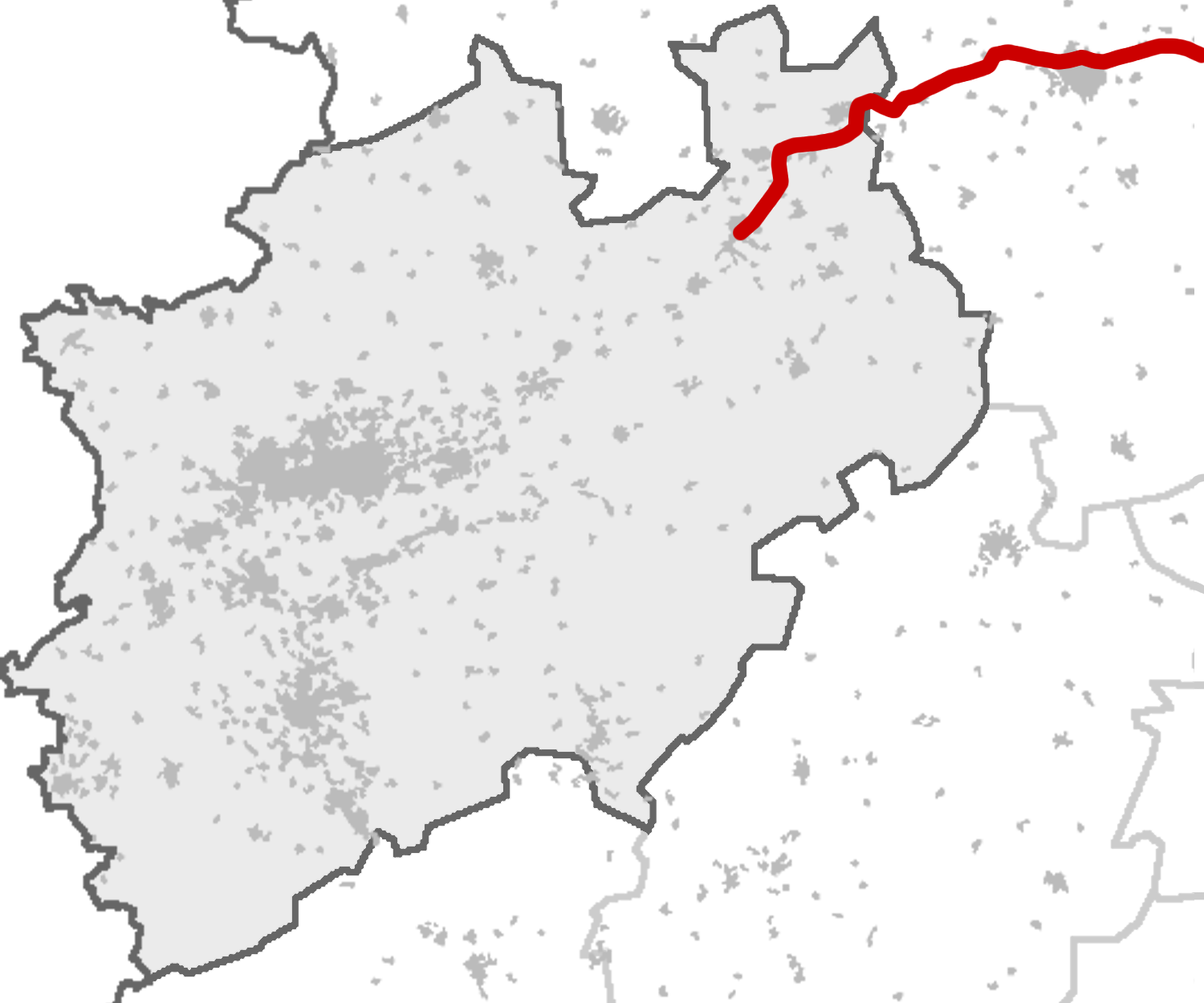

Overview
- Locale: North Rhine-Westphalia, Germany

Service
- Route number: 310, 370

Technical
- Line length: 169.4 km (105.3 mi)
- Operating speed: 160 km/h (99 mph) (maximum)

The Weser-Leine-Express (RE 70) is the name used in North Rhine-Westphalia (NRW) for a Regional-Express service that connects the east Westphalian regional centre of Bielefeld and Minden and the Lower Saxony regional centres of Hanover and Braunschweig. The NRW government found that there was sufficient state interest for it to support operations on the section in that state. The service alternates with the Ems-Leine-Express, which connects Rheine with Minden and Braunschweig. The border between North Rhine-Westphalia and Lower Saxony Between is crossed between Minden and Bückeburg.

== History and future ==
Since the introduction of the integrated regular-interval timetable in the whole of North Rhine-Westphalia (NRW-Takt) in 1998, the connection between Bielefeld and Braunschweig has been operated as the RE 70 under the name of the Weser-Leine Express, after the Weser and Leine rivers. It is being operated by DB Regio Nord until December 2015. The new tender process carried out in 2012 was won by WestfalenBahn, which will operate the so-called Mittellandlinie (midland line) from December 2015 until December 2030. According to a press statement, the number of seats will be increased by up to 60 per bi-level car.

== Rail services ==
The service runs every two hours. Together with the service designated as the Ems-Leine-Express in NRW, which also runs every two hours to Rheine, an hourly service is provided between Braunschweig and Löhne. The Bielefeld-Löhne-Minden section is operated together with the Rhein-Weser-Express and the Porta-Express (to Nienburg) RE services every half-hour from Monday to Friday (with small deviations from a strictly 30-minute service). Line S1 of the S-Bahn Hannover operates every hour between Minden and Hanover, so that is a scheduled half-hourly connections between Bielefeld and Hanover (on weekdays), but there are few connections in Minden, as delays to trains often prevent connections with the Westfalen-Express. In addition, the total route is served by Intercity Express services.

A dining service with a minibar is provided on services to Hanover.

The service is operated with trains of five double-deck coaches hauled mostly by class 111 or occasionally class 146 locomotives. Since the line is operated with a double-deck driving trailer–pushed towards Bielefeld–the locomotive does not have to be switched around at the terminus.

== Fares ==
The Weser-Leine-Express passes through the passes through the territory of three regional transport associations with different fare systems. Between Bielefeld and Minden, Der Sechser ("the six") fare of the Verkehrsverbund OstWestfalenLippe (transport association of OstWestfalenLippe) applies. Between Haste and Hämelerwald the fares of the Großraum-Verkehr Hannover (transport association of greater Hannover, GVH) apply. Between Hämelerwald and Braunschweig the fares of the Verbundtarif Region Braunschweig (Braunschweig region fare alliance, VRB) apply. The statewide fares of Lower Saxony (e.g. the Niedersachsen-Ticket) also apply between Löhne and Braunschweig.

== Railways ==
From west to east the Ems-Leine-Express uses the following lines:

- the Hamm–Minden railway between Bielefeld and Minden,
- the Hanover–Minden railway for its whole length,
- the Hanover–Brunswick railway for its whole length.
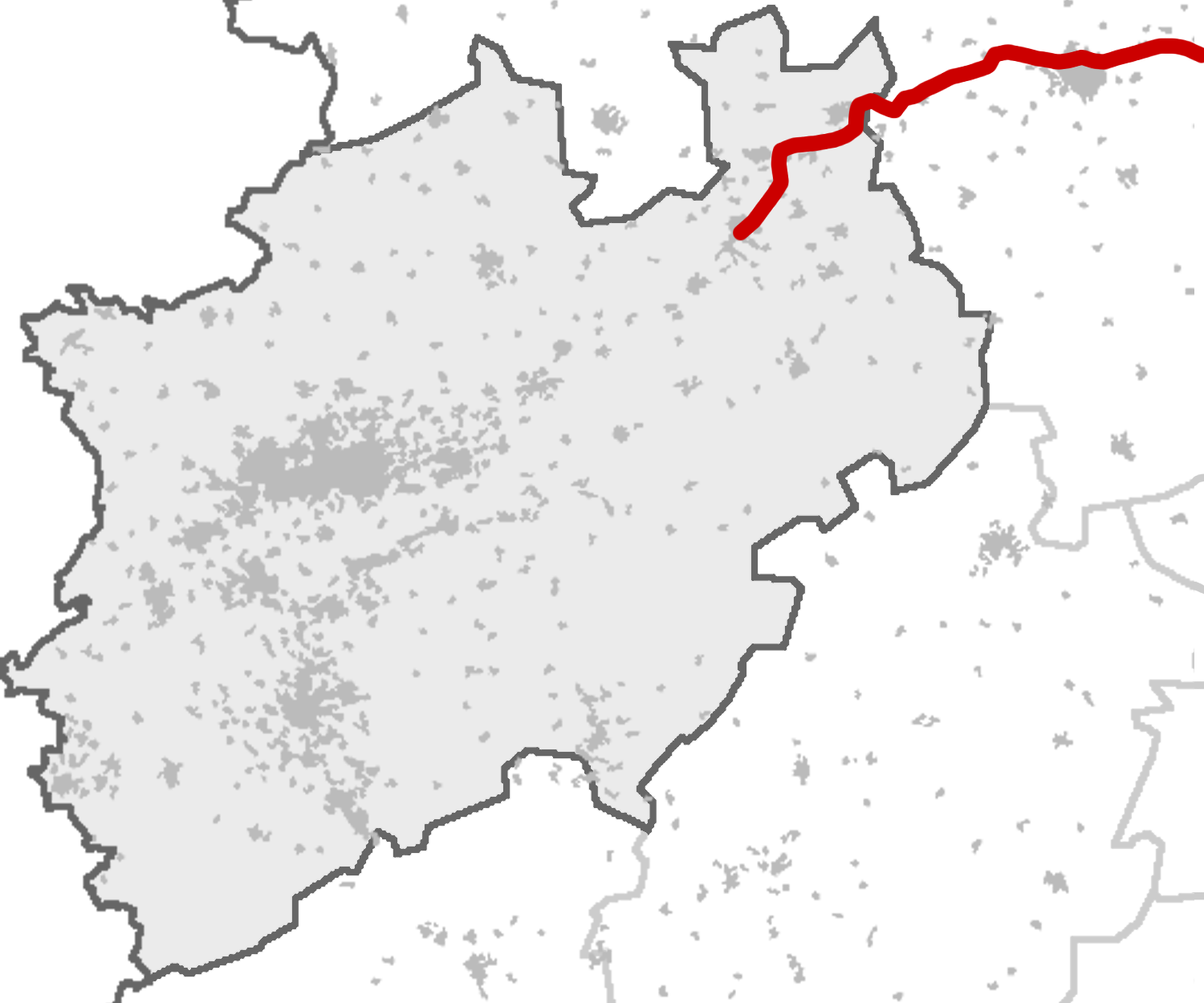
Southwesterly route of the Weser-Leine-Express (RE 70) near Hämelerwald

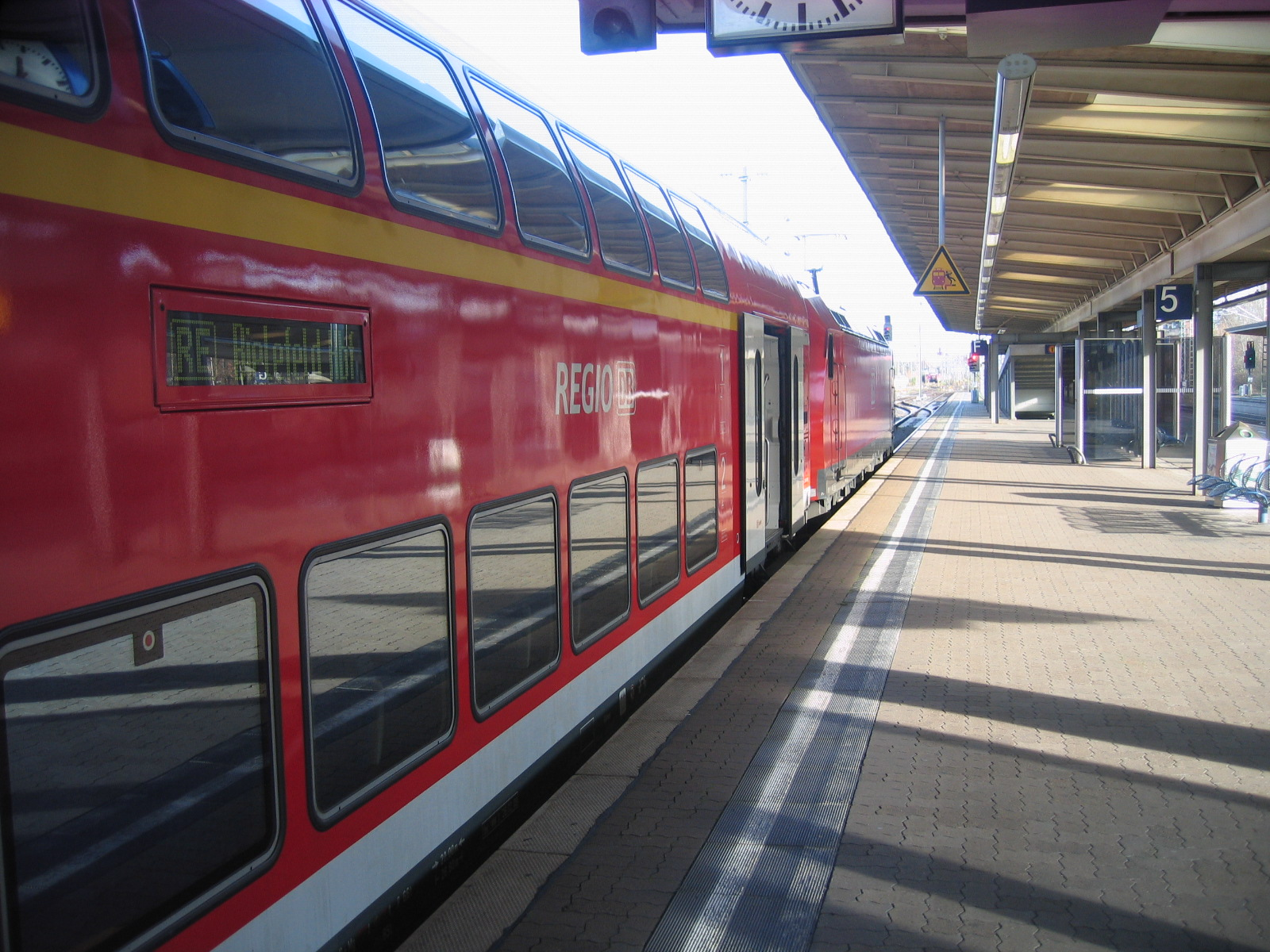
RE 70 departing to Bielefeld in Braunschweig

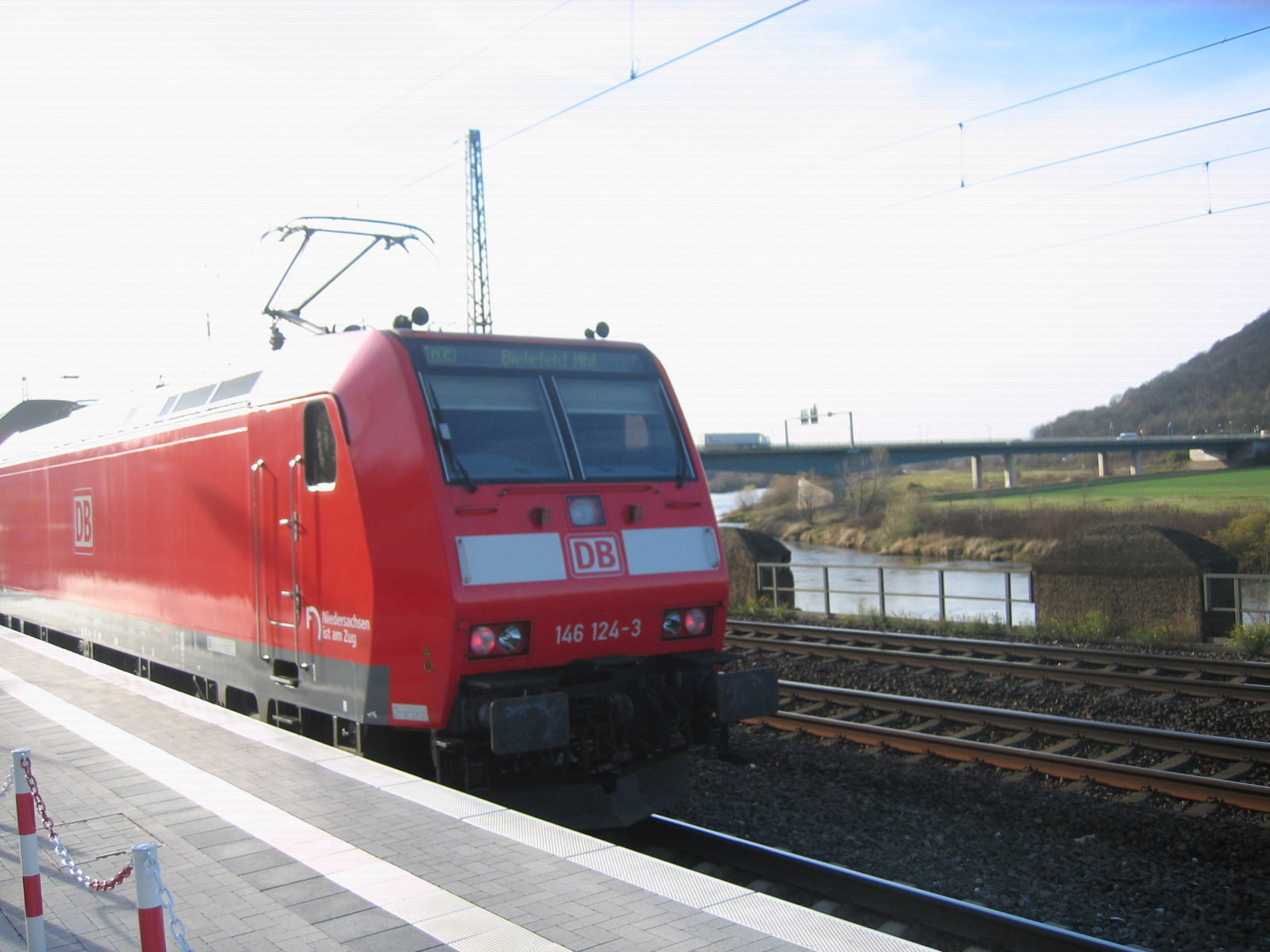
Pushing locomotive in Porta Westfalica station

== See also ==
- List of regional railway lines in North Rhine-Westphalia
