= Nienburg (Weser) station =

Railway station in Nienburg/Weser, Germany

Nienburg (Weser)
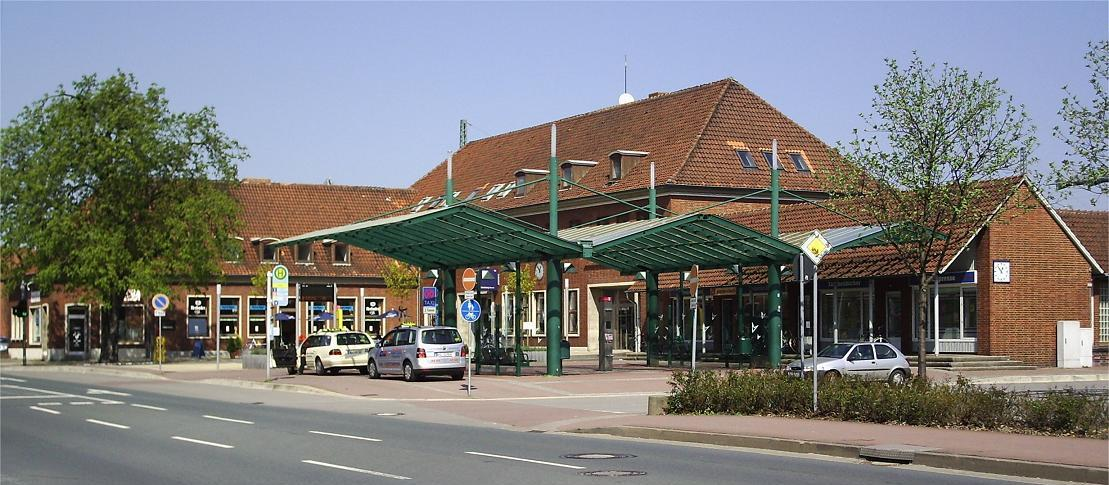
- Nienburg railway station

General information
- Location: Bahnhofstr. 11, Nienburg, Lower Saxony; Germany
- Coordinates: 52.3841°N 9.1307°E
- Lines: Bremen–Hanover railway; Nienburg–Minden railway
- Platforms: 6

Other information
- Fare zone: VLN: 1 (buses only); GVH: F (VLN transitional tariff, monthly passes only)
- Website: www.bahnhof.de

History
- Opened: 1847

Services
Preceding station	DB Fernverkehr	Following station
Verden (Aller) towards Oldenburg Hbf	ICE 10	Hannover Hbf towards Berlin Ostbahnhof
Verden (Aller) towards Norddeich Mole	IC 56	Hannover Hbf towards Leipzig Hbf
Preceding station	DB Regio Nord	Following station
Eystrup towards Norddeich Mole	RE 1	Neustadt am Rübenberge towards Hannover Hbf
Eystrup towards Bremerhaven-Lehe	RE 8	Neustadt am Rübenberge towards Hannover Hbf
Preceding station		Following station
Leese-Stolzenau towards Bielefeld Hbf	RE 78	Terminus
Preceding station	Hanover S-Bahn	Following station
Terminus	S 2	Linsburg towards Haste (Han)
Location
- Location within Lower Saxony Location within Germany Location within Europe

Nienburg (German: Bahnhof Nienburg) is a railway station located in Nienburg, Germany. The station is located on the Bremen–Hanover railway and the Nienburg–Minden railway. The train services are operated by Deutsche Bahn. The station is also served by the Hanover S-Bahn.

== Train services ==
The following services currently call at the station:

- Intercity services IC 56 Norddeich - Emden - Oldenburg - Bremen - Hanover - Braunschweig - Magdeburg - Leipzig / Berlin - Cottbus
- Regional services RE 1 Norddeich - Emden - Oldenburg - Bremen - Nienburg - Hanover
- Regional services RE 8 Bremerhaven-Lehe - Bremen - Nienburg - Hanover
- Regional services RE 78 Porta-Express Nienburg - Minden - Bielefeld
- Hannover S-Bahn services S 2 Nienburg - Wunstorf - Hanover - Weetzen - Haste
