= Moderus Beta =

Low-floor tram produced by Modertrans Poznań

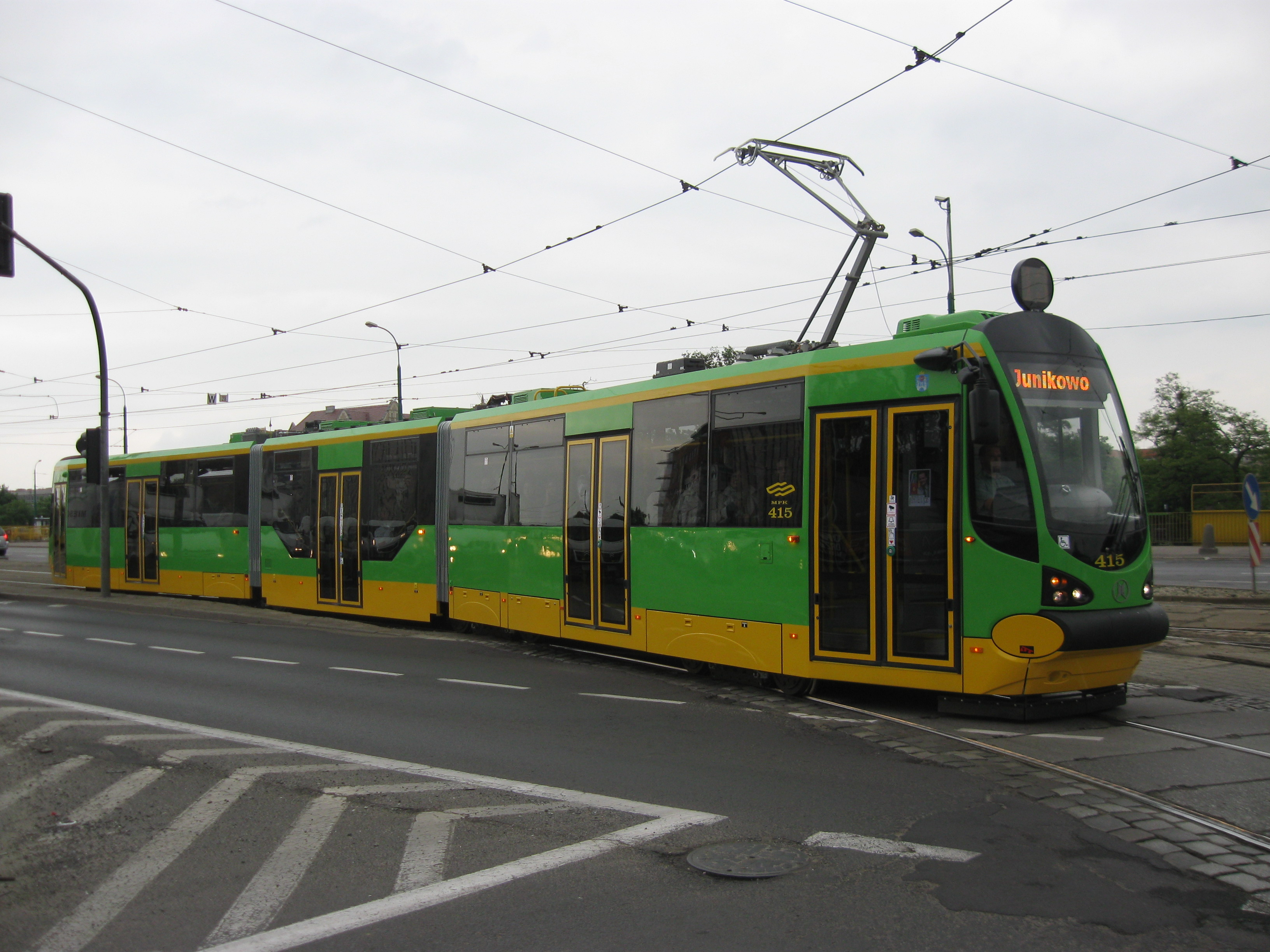
- Moderus Beta in Poznań
- Manufacturer: Modertrans Poznań
- Assembly: Biskupice, Poland
- Constructed: since 2011
- Number built: 162

Specifications
- Train length: 28,250 mm (1,112 in)
- Width: 2,350 mm (93 in)
- Height: 3,350 mm (132 in)
- Low-floor: 25%
- Articulated sections: 3
- Maximum speed: 70 km/h (43 mph)

Moderus Beta is a partially low-floor tram, available in either one or three sections, with a single or dual direction configuration. It is produced by the company Modertrans Poznań. These trams are in operation in the Metropolis GZM, Poznań, Szczecin, Wrocław, Elbląg, and Grudziądz. A total of 162 units have been produced.

== History ==
=== First Moderus Beta trams for Poznań ===
On 31 December 2005, the Municipal Transport Company in Poznań (MPK Poznań), which had previously modernized its trams independently, established a subsidiary company, Modertrans Poznań, based on the Bus Repair Department in Biskupice. Simultaneously, the company's scope of activity was expanded to include tram modernization. Initially, MPK Poznań was the primary recipient of the modernized trams, receiving 68 upgraded 105Na trams, known as Moderus Alfa, between 2006 and 2010.

In 2009, MPK Poznań ordered 4 trams (with an option for 3 more) from its subsidiary, based on the Moderus Alfa design but in a three-section, single-space configuration. These were single-sided, one-directional trams consisting of two high-floor sections each on two bogies, with a middle section suspended between them, featuring a low-floor area. Initially, it was planned that the Moderus Beta trams would be a modernization of the 105Na model, but the plans changed, and an entirely new vehicle was built, inspired by the 105Na model. Ultimately, the order was expanded to 24 units.

=== Additional orders ===
- 4 September 2014 – contract signed for the delivery of components and parts for 1 Beta MF 15 AC for Tramwaje Szczecińskie.
- 27 November 2014 – contract signed for the delivery of 12 Betas MF 16 AC BD for Tramwaje Śląskie.
- 7 July 2015 – contract signed for the delivery of 6 Betas MF 19 AC (with an option for 16 more) for Municipal Transport Company in Wrocław (MPK Wrocław).
- January 2016 – contract signed for the delivery of 20 Betas MF 20 AC (with an option for 10 more) for MPK Poznań.
- April 2016 – contract signed for the delivery of 10 Betas MF 22 AC BD for MPK Poznań.
- Mid-2016 – contract signed for the delivery of 3 Betas MF 19 AC (as part of a previous order option) for MPK Wrocław.
- End of 2016 – contract signed for the delivery of 13 Betas MF 19 AC (as part of a previous order option) for MPK Wrocław.
- June 2017 – contract signed for the delivery of 3 Betas MF 09 AC for Elbląg trams.
- 13 October 2017 – contract signed for the delivery of 40 Betas for MPK Wrocław.
- December 2017 – contract signed for the delivery of components and parts for 2 Betas for Tramwaje Szczecińskie.
- 17 January 2018 – contract signed for the delivery of 1 Beta MF 09 AC for Elbląg trams.
- 8 March 2018 – contract signed for the delivery of 8 Betas MF 10 AC and 2 Betas MF 11 AC BD for Tramwaje Śląskie.
- January 2020 – contract signed for the delivery of 1 Beta MF 09 AC for Elbląg trams.
- 25 March 2021 – contract signed for the delivery of 4 Betas MF 28 AC for Municipal Transport Authority in Grudziądz.

=== Testing without orders ===
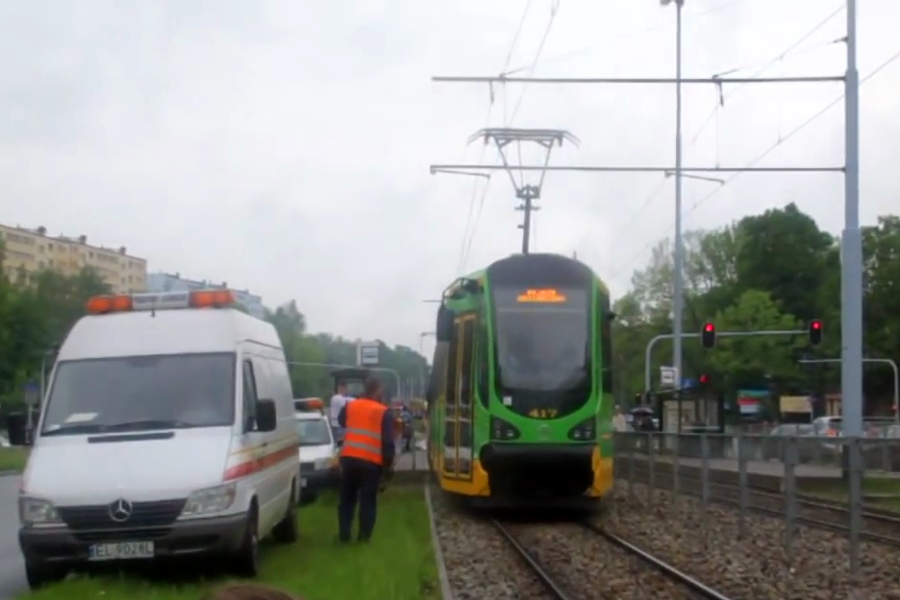
Testing of Poznań's Beta in Łódź

On 8 May 2012, one of Poznań's Beta MF 02 AC trams was transported to Łódź, where it was fitted with narrow-gauge bogies from another tram. On May 10, the unit was presented, and the first test runs took place. The following day, tests began in regular service. The tram was tested on lines 7, 9A, 11, 12, and 16A, with some routes only undergoing night tests without passengers. The tests were conducted because Municipal Transport Company in Łódź was considering modernizing its trams using the expertise of Modertrans. On June 6, the tram returned to Poznań.

== Construction ==
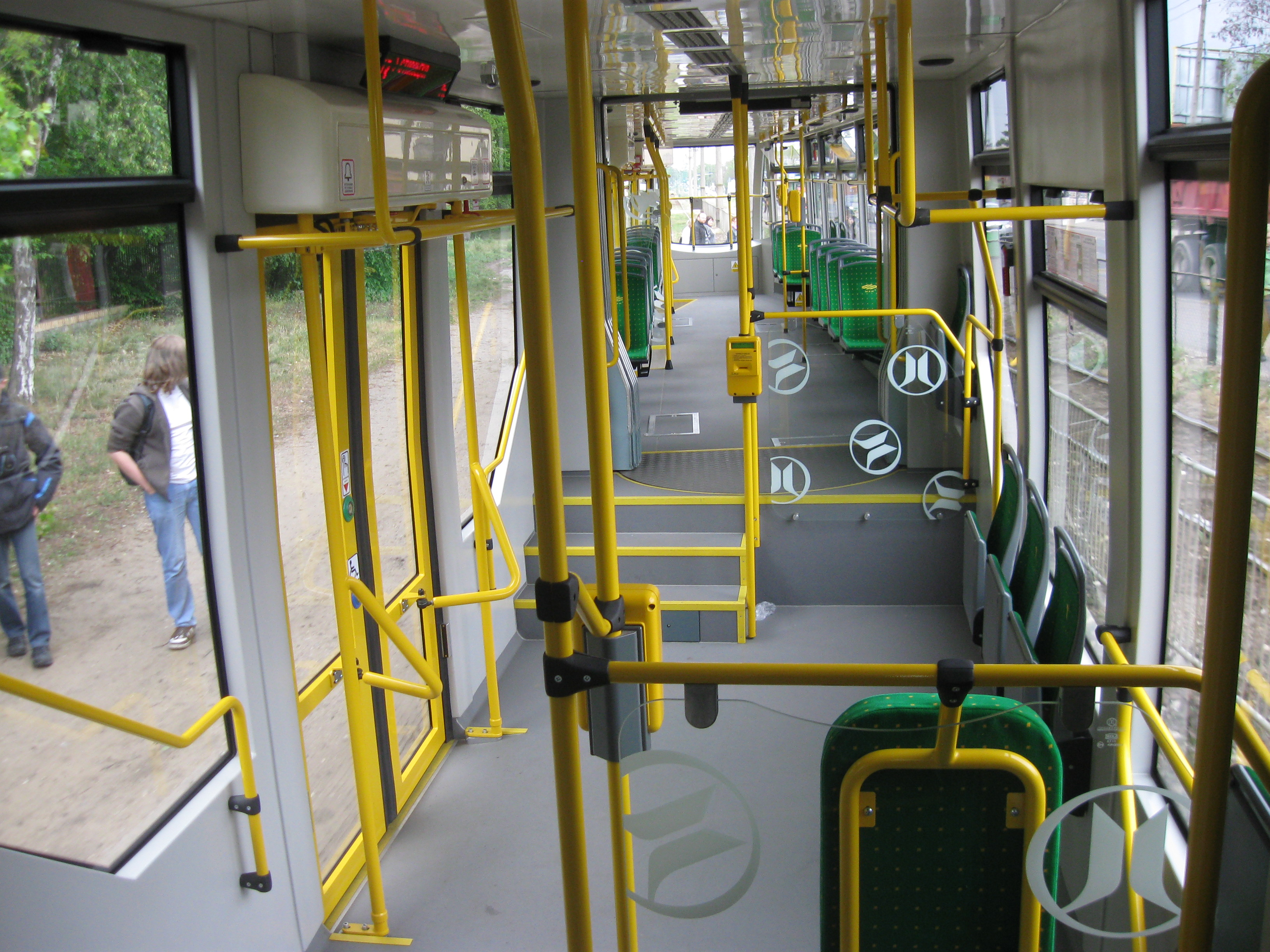
Interior of low-floor section

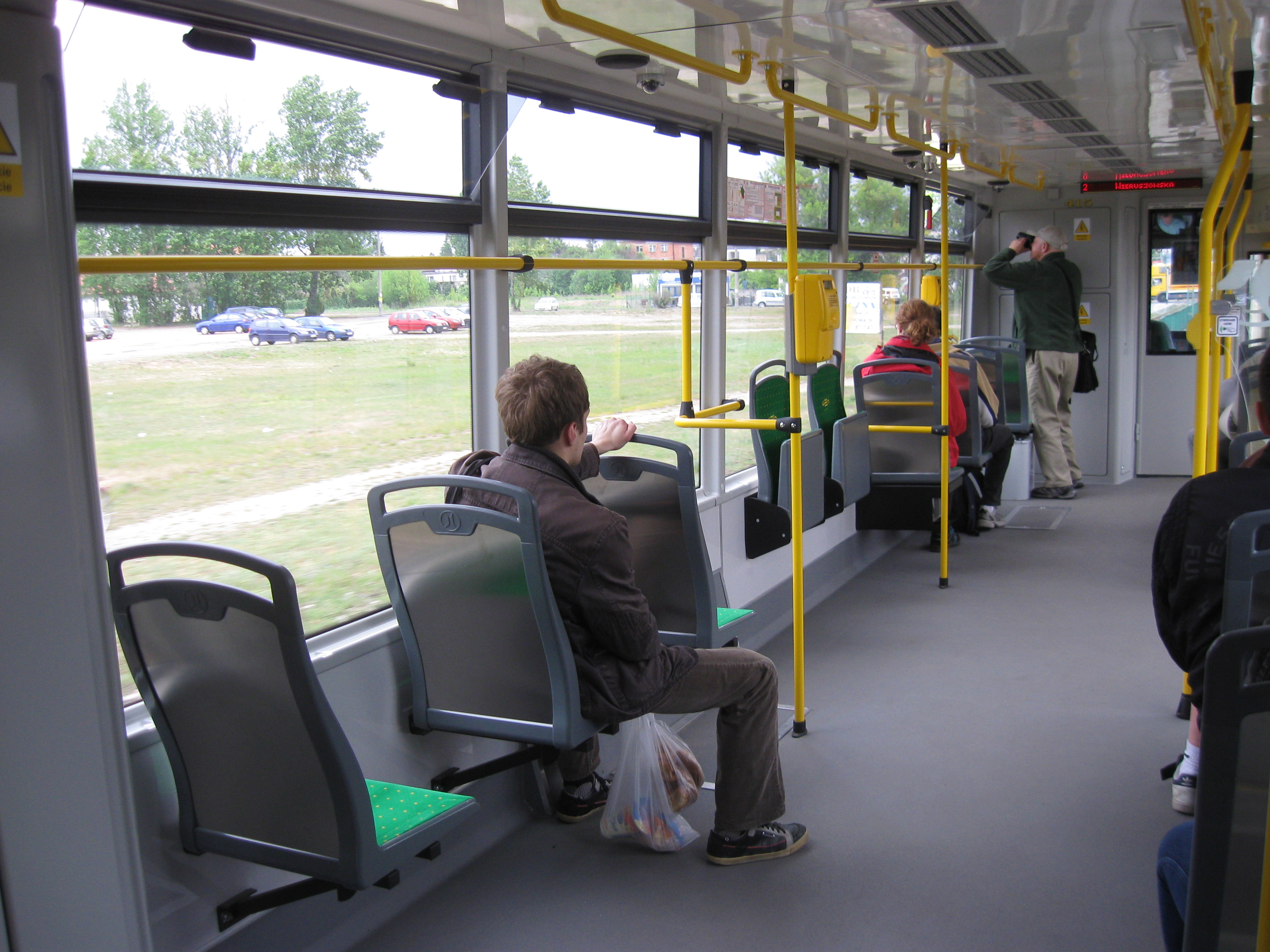
Interior of high-floor section

The Moderus Beta is available as either a single or three-section tram. In the three-section version, the middle section is low-floor, and the doors are sliding and open outward. It measures 28.25 meters in length, 2.35 meters in width, and 3.35 meters in height. The tram can travel at a maximum speed of 70 km/h.

The Beta MF is equipped with energy-efficient AC motor technology that facilitates energy recovery and transmission to the traction network.

The Szczecin version differs from the Poznań version with double rows of seats in the end sections, additional seating in the low-floor section, and a passenger information system. Additionally, the low-floor section features a retractable platform to assist with the boarding of strollers and wheelchairs.

Number of sections	Type	Seats	Features	Sources
1	MF 09 AC	26+2		
1	MF 10 AC		wheelchair accessibility, air conditioning, USB chargers	
1	MF 11 AC BD		wheelchair accessibility, air conditioning, bi-directional tram, USB chargers	
3	MF 02 AC	30+9	wheelchair accessibility	
3	MF 15 AC	62	wheelchair accessibility, ticket machines	
3	MF 16 AC BD	46	wheelchair accessibility, bi-directional tram	
3	MF 19 AC	40	wheelchair accessibility, air conditioning, ticket machines, USB chargers	
3	MF 20 AC		wheelchair accessibility, air conditioning, USB chargers, bike racks	
3	MF 22 AC BD		bi-directional tram, air conditioning, USB chargers	
3	MF 24 AC			
3	MF 29 AC BD	40+6	wheelchair accessibility, air conditioning, bi-directional tram, bike racks, USB chargers	
3	MF 28 AC		wheelchair accessibility, ticket machines	

== Operation ==
Operation

Country	Location	Operator	Type	Operating period	Number	Photo	Sources
Poland	Poznań	MPK Poznań	MF02AC	since 2011	24		
Poland	Poznań	MPK Poznań	MF20AC	since 2016	20		
Poland	Poznań	MPK Poznań	MF22AC BD	since 2017	10		
Poland	Szczecin	Tramwaje Szczecińskie	MF15AC	since 2014	2		
Poland	Szczecin	Tramwaje Szczecińskie	MF25AC	since 2018	2		
Poland	Szczecin	Tramwaje Szczecińskie	MF29AC BD	since 2021	6		
Poland	Metropolis GZM	Tramwaje Śląskie	MF16AC BD	since 2015	12		
Poland	Metropolis GZM	Tramwaje Śląskie	MF10AC	since 2020	13		
Poland	Metropolis GZM	Tramwaje Śląskie	MF11AC BD	since 2020	3		
Poland	Metropolis GZM	Tramwaje Śląskie	MF30AC BD	since 2026	10		
Poland	Wrocław	MPK Wrocław	MF19AC	since 2015	22		
Poland	Wrocław	MPK Wrocław	MF24AC	since 2018	40		
Poland	Elbląg	Elbląg trams	MF09AC	since 2020	5		
Poland	Grudziądz	MZK Grudziądz	MF28AC	since 2022	4		
Total:					173		

=== Poznań ===
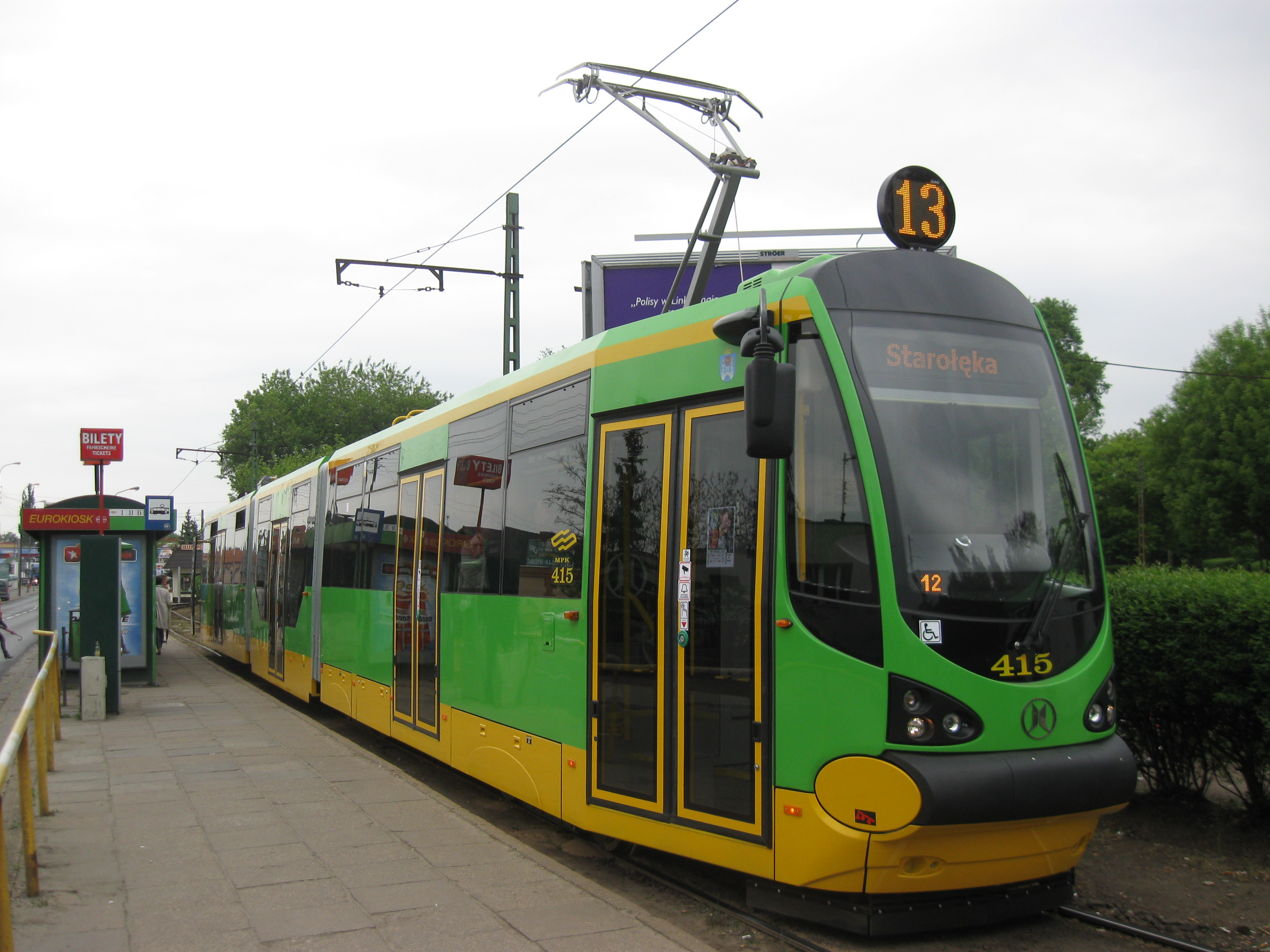
Moderus Beta MF 02 AC

On 12 March 2011, the first of 24 ordered trams arrived at the depot on Forteczna Street. On April 28, it received its homologation certificate, and on 17 May 2011, it debuted in regular service on line no. 13. In 2011, a total of 9 units were delivered, 5 in 2012, another 5 in 2013, and 3 units in 2014. The last, 24th unit was delivered on 31 December 2015.

In January 2016, the operator ordered 20 more Beta trams with an option to expand by an additional 10 units. These trams were to differ in interior equipment from those previously ordered. The first unit was received on September 1.

In April 2016, the operator ordered another 10 Beta trams, this time in a bi-directional version. The first bi-directional unit debuted on line no. 1 on 11 January 2017.

=== Szczecin ===
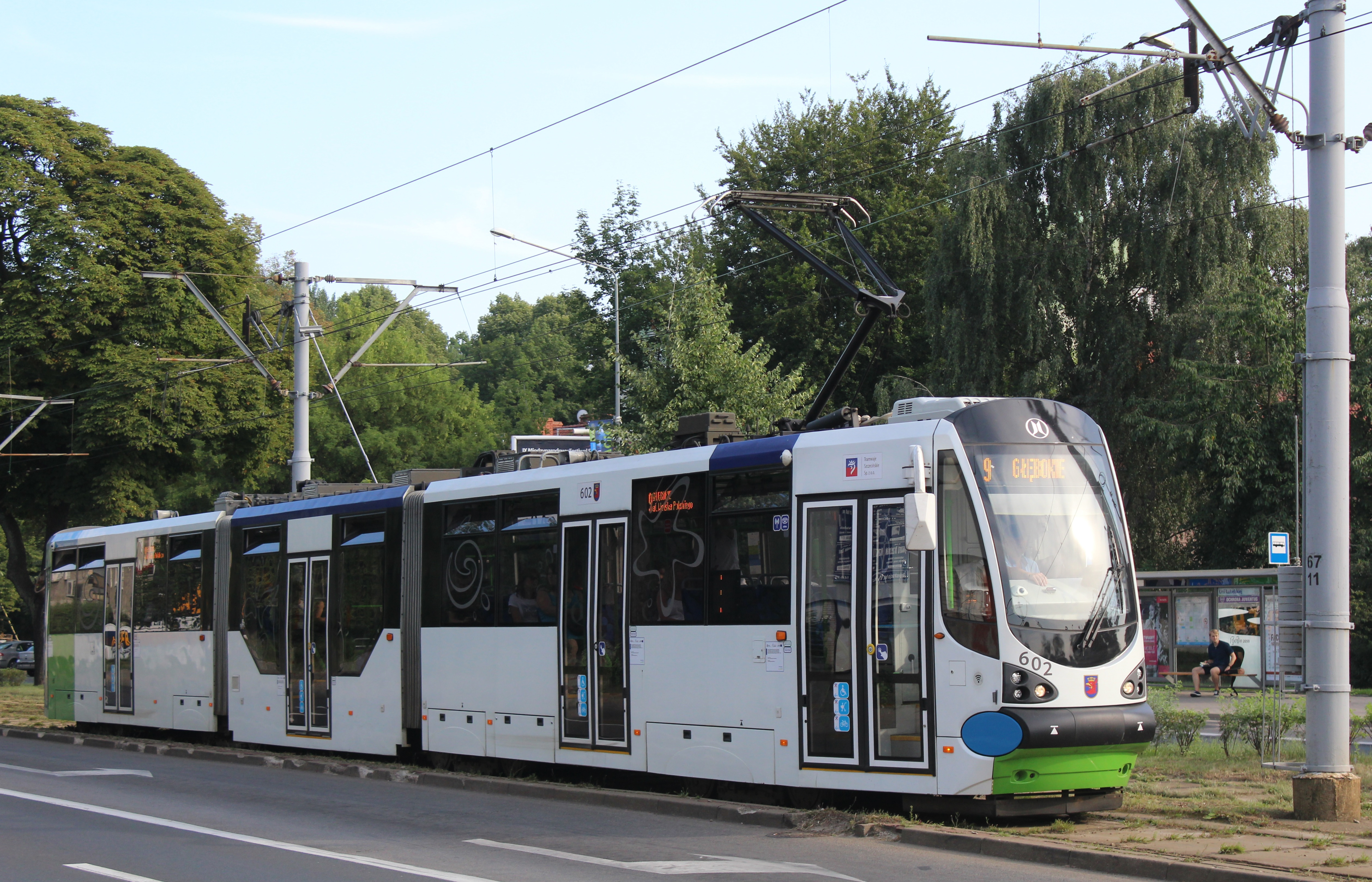
Moderus Beta MF 15 AC

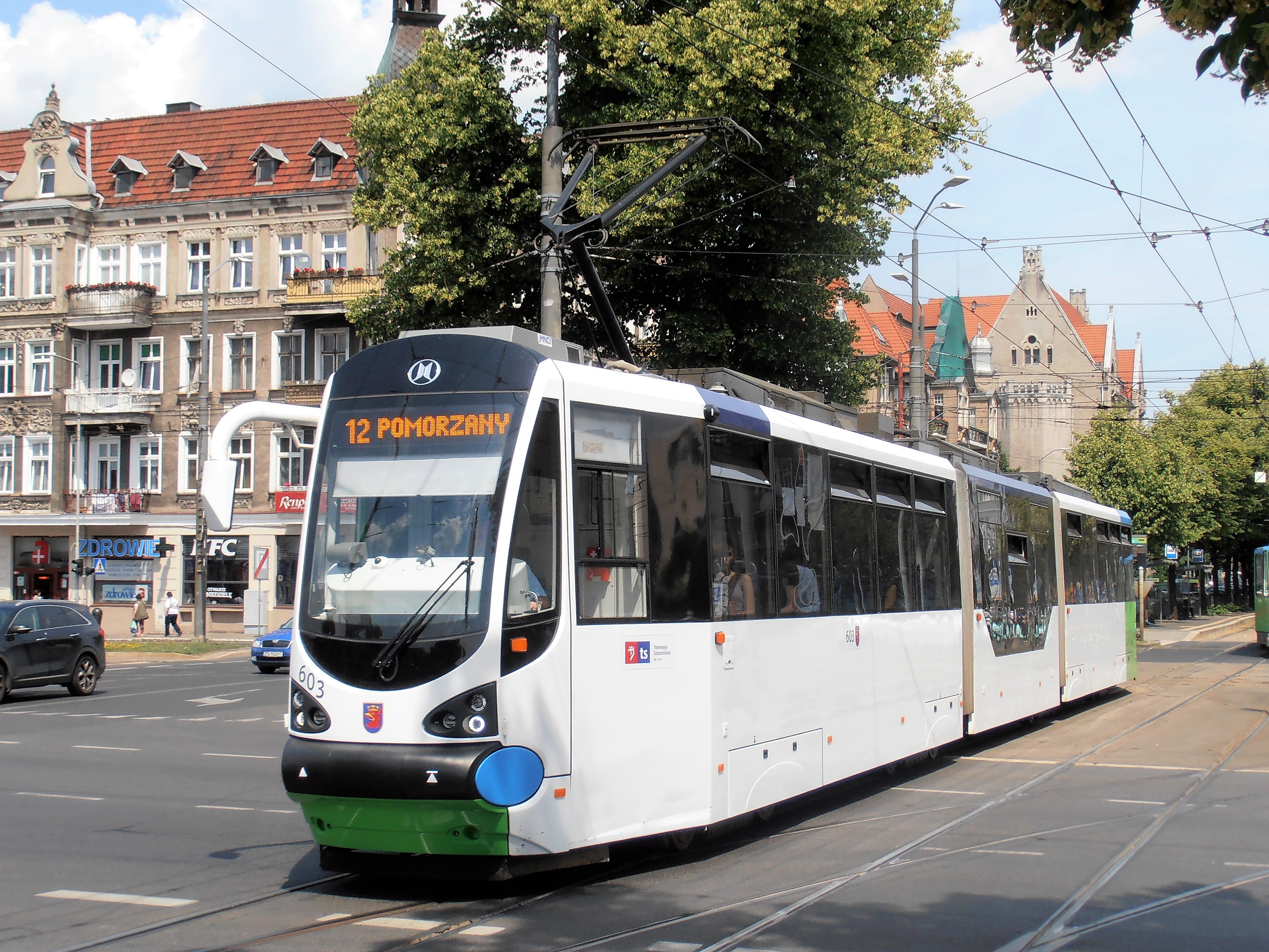
Moderus Beta MF 25 AC

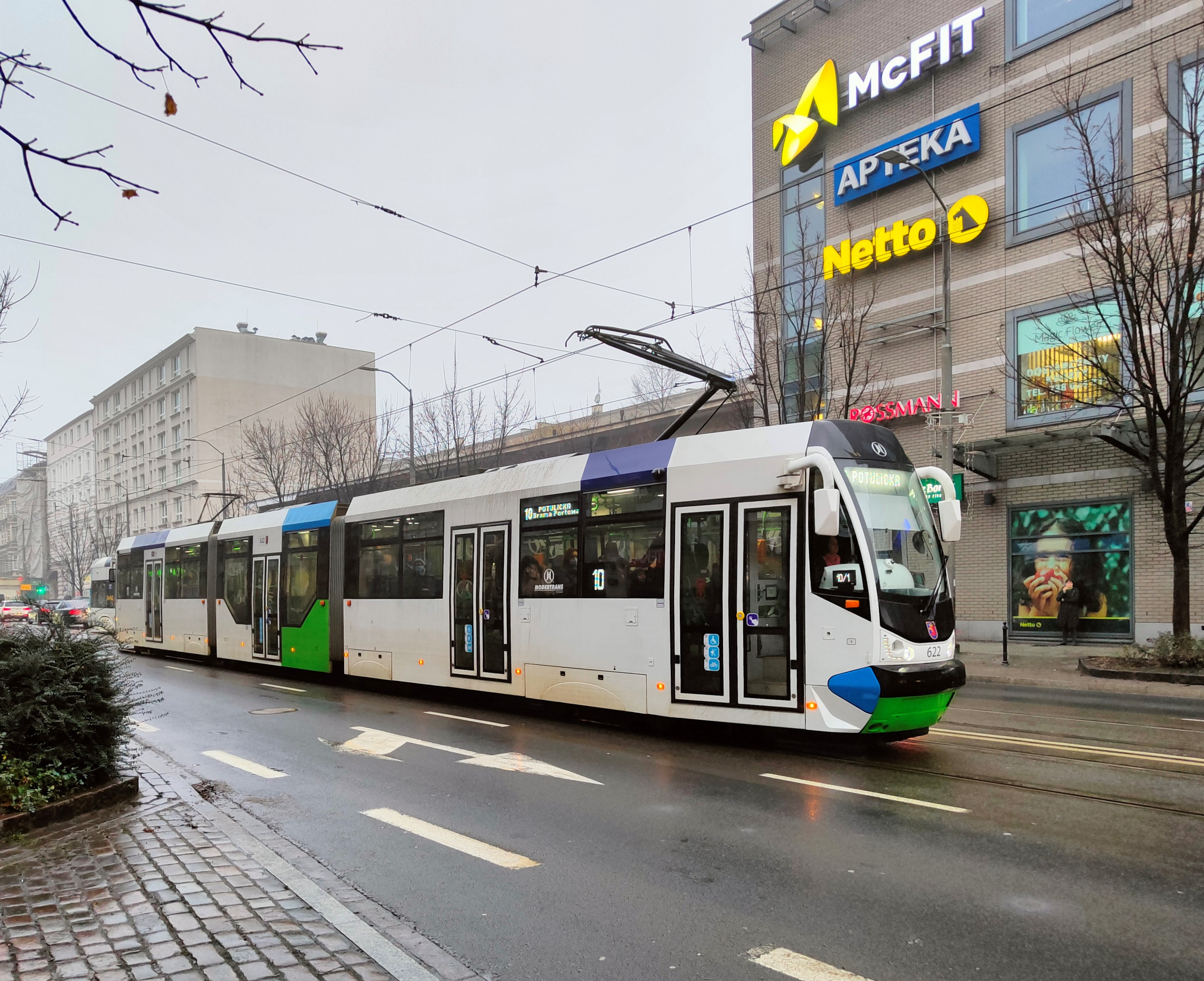
Moderus Beta MF 29 AC

On 11 March 2013, Modertrans signed a contract with Tramwaje Szczecińskie for the delivery of components and parts for one Moderus Beta tram. On 9 May 2014, the tram body and bogies were delivered to the repair facilities on Klonowica Street, where the tram was assembled by Tramwaje Szczecińskie employees. By late August, the tram was ready and began testing. On August 27, the tram independently traveled from the workshop where it was assembled to the Pogodno depot. On 4 September 2014, the new tram was presented. On the same day, a contract was signed for the delivery of components and parts for a second tram, which was also assembled by Tramwaje Szczecińskie. On October 9, the tram numbered 601 began operating on line No. 3 from Arkona Forest Park to Pomorzany. On October 24, the body of the second Moderus was delivered to Szczecin, and on 19 January 2015, it began passenger service on line No. 1. By the end of February and early March, it was redirected to service line No. 3. Both trams were assigned to the Pogodno depot.

In December 2017, Tramwaje Szczecińskie signed a contract with Modertrans for the delivery of components for the assembly of 2 additional trams, with the option to extend the order by 2 more units. The body of the first tram was delivered to Szczecin on 20 March 2018, and by September, both trams from this order were already in service.

At the end of August 2020, Modertrans won a tender for the delivery of parts for the assembly of two trams with an option for two additional sets of components. The trams were to be assembled at the Tramwaje Szczecińskie workshops, but due to the COVID-19 pandemic, the work was done by Szczecin staff at the manufacturer's facilities. The first tram was delivered to the Szczecin Pogodno depot on 14 December 2020, and in mid-January 2021, it began passenger service. In September 2021, Tramwaje Szczecińskie decided to exercise the option for 2 additional trams. The third Beta from this order (the first from the option) arrived in Szczecin on 28 December 2021, and by 1 February 2022, both trams were in service at the Pogodno depot. In April 2023, a contract was signed for the delivery of components for the assembly of 2 additional bi-directional Betas. In May, bi-directional operation of the Betas began for the first time – the modernization of the tracks at Victory Square necessitated operating line No. 8 in a shuttle mode on one track and ending tram runs at the Port Gate. On 6 October 2023, the first of the additional Betas was delivered, and on October 21, it went into service on line No. 10.

=== Metropolis GZM ===
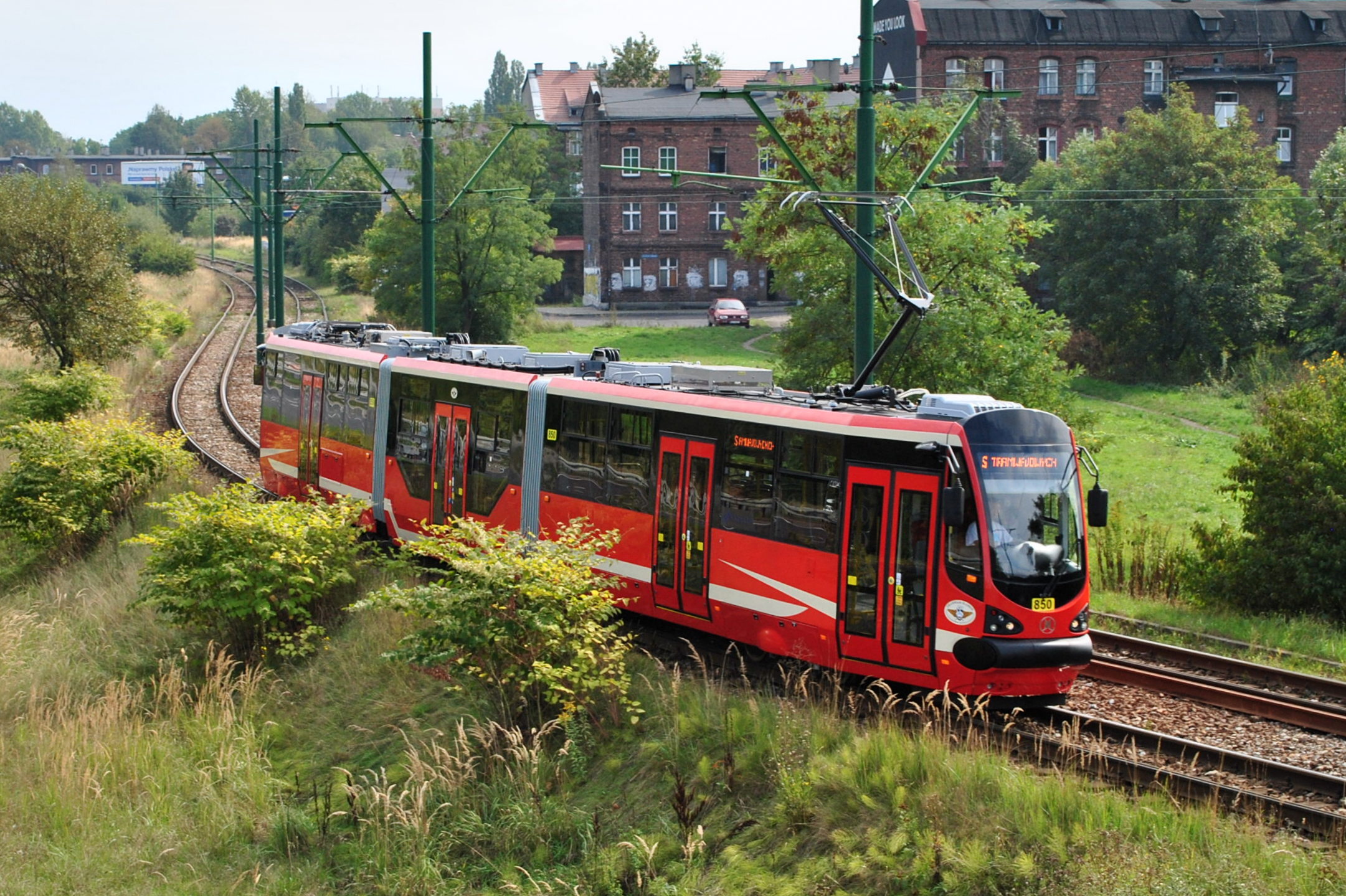
Moderus Beta MF 16 AC BD

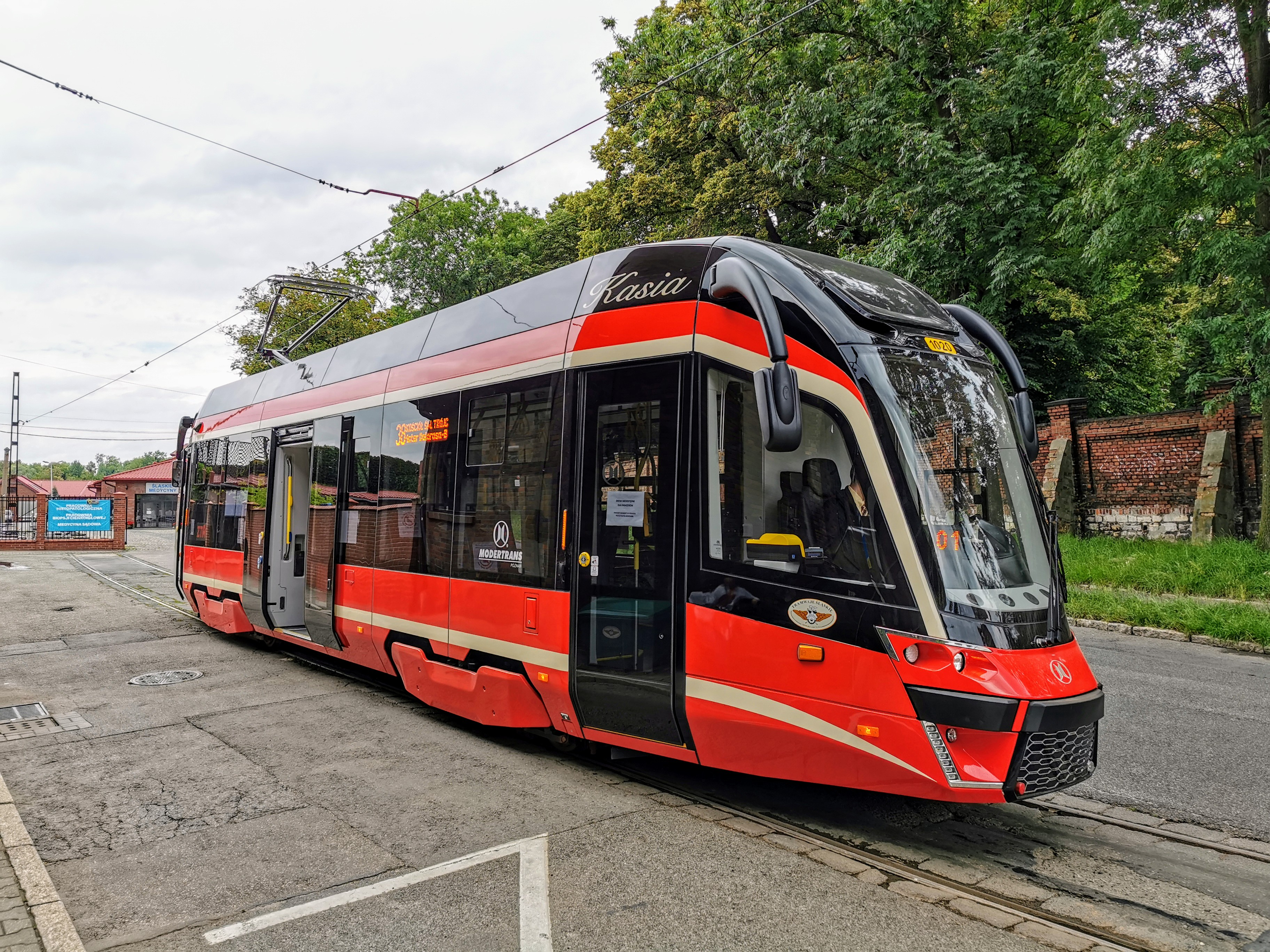
Moderus Beta MF 11 AC BD

On 27 November 2014, Modertrans signed a contract with Tramwaje Śląskie for the delivery of 12 bidirectional Moderus Beta trams. The first tram was delivered to the Stroszek depot at the end of August 2015. On September 19, during the open days of Tramwaje Śląskie, the trams were given the name Skarbek (English: little treasure), which was chosen in a previous passenger vote. On 7 November 2015, two trams began servicing line No. 5 connecting Bytom with Zabrze. Deliveries were completed in mid-November. Five trams were assigned to the Będzin depot, and the remaining seven to the Stroszek depot. On 7 January 2016, all five Będzin-based Betas were assigned to service line No. 21 from Sosnowiec to Dąbrowa Górnicza. By mid-2016, the Betas from Bytom were servicing lines 5, 7, and 19.

On 8 March 2018, Modertrans signed a contract with Tramwaje Śląskie for the delivery of 10 single-section trams (8 unidirectional and 2 bidirectional). The body design of these trams is based on the Moderus Gamma trams. The order included an option for 5 additional unidirectional trams, which the carrier exercised. In February 2020, the first unidirectional tram was ready and began homologation runs in Poznań, after which it was transported to the Katowice depot on the night of March 15/16. At the end of March, the tram received its homologation certificate, and on April 16, test runs began in the cities of the conurbation. On April 22, the first bidirectional tram was transported to the Franowo depot in Poznań, where it underwent homologation tests between April 23 and May 1.

On 20 June 2020, the unidirectional trams debuted in regular service on line 0, with entries and exits to the Stroszek depot as line 19. On 9 July 2020, the bidirectional trams began passenger service on the reopened line 38. From that day, all Silesian trams from the short Moderus family have been identified with the name Kasia. On 1 August 2020, the MF 10 AC cars began regular service on line 19. On 10 August 2020, the MF 10 AC cars began service on line 11. The delivery of the cars was completed at the end of September.

=== Wrocław ===
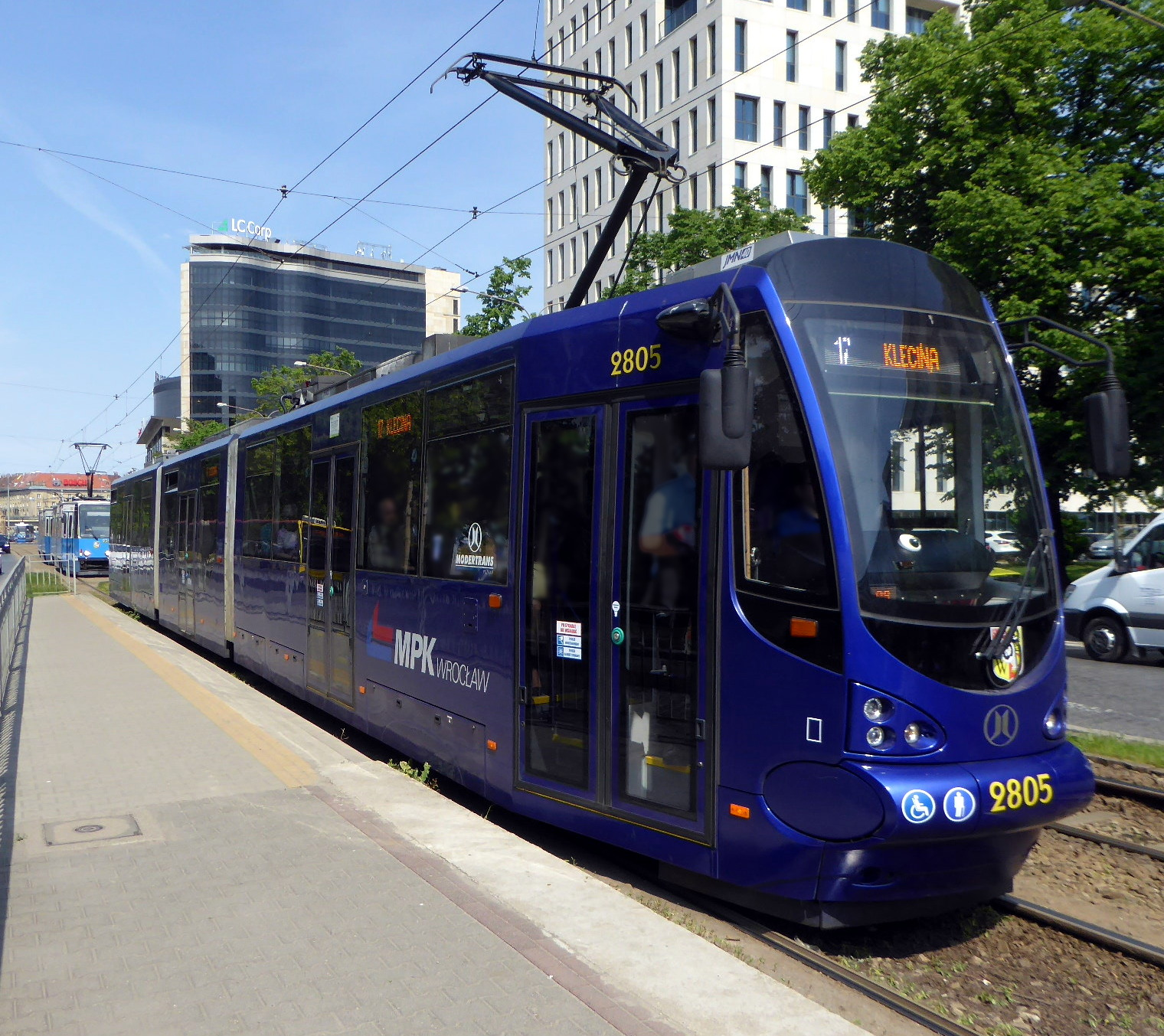
Moderus Beta MF 19 AC

On 7 July 2015, Modertrans signed a contract with MPK Wrocław for the delivery of 6 trams by the end of 2015, with an option for an additional 16 by the end of 2017. These were purchased to replace the oldest 105Na-type cars.

On 11 December 2015, the first tram was delivered, followed by three more during the night of December 13/14, and the deliveries were completed on December 16. The trams were assigned to the depot on Kamienna Street, and a few days later began test runs in the city, which were interrupted after just one day. On December 30, two Betas entered regular service, debuting on line 17.

In mid-2016, MPK Wrocław exercised its option for 3 additional units, and later in the year for another 13. The first of the additional trams was delivered in mid-January 2017, and deliveries were completed by the end of the year.

On 3 June 2017, a passenger fell out of a tram during a ride due to a door malfunction.

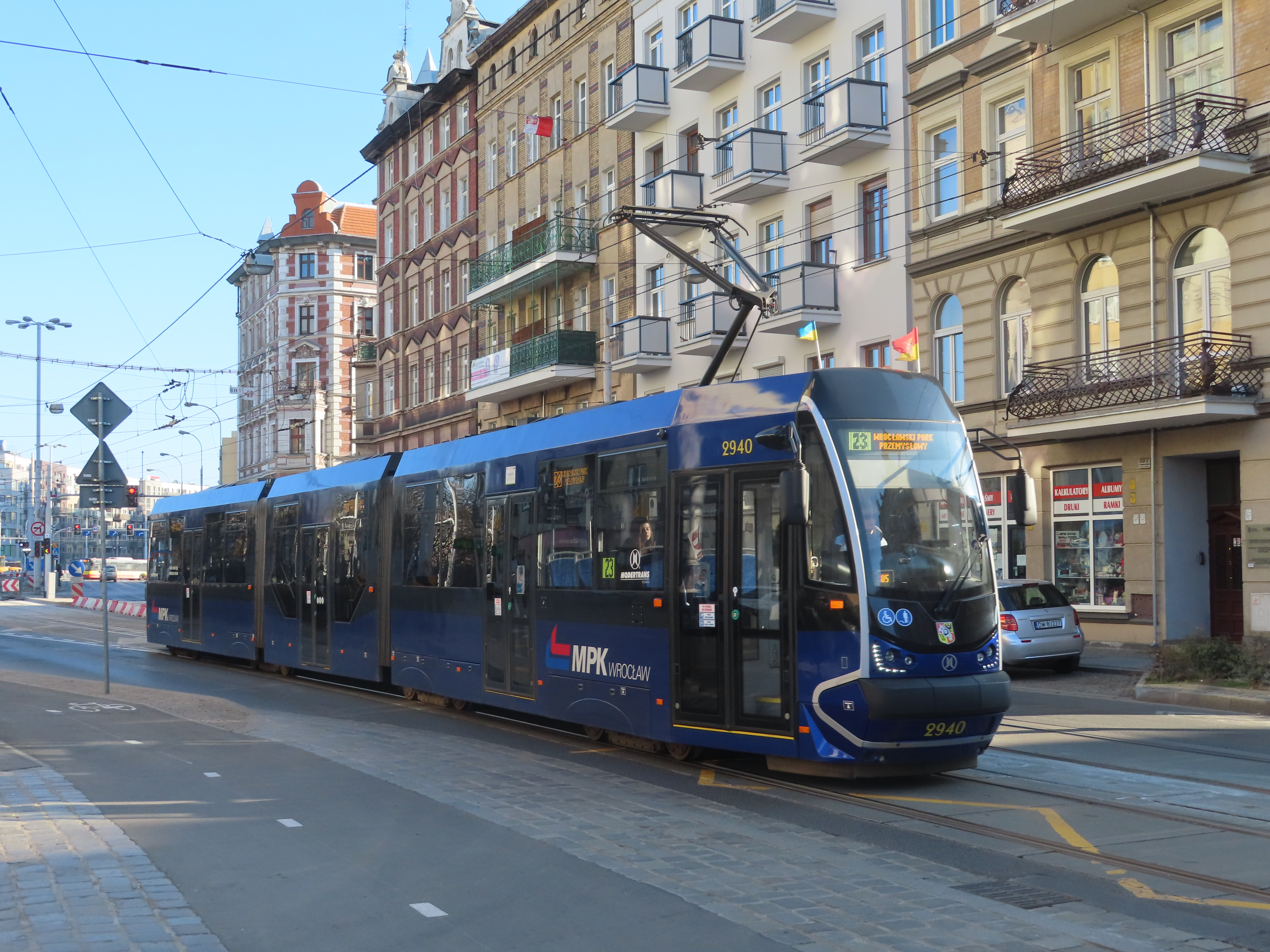
Moderus Beta MF 24 AC

On 13 October 2017, MPK ordered an additional 40 Betas under a separate contract. On the night of 18/19 February 2018, the first unit from this order was delivered. By the end of the year, a total of 30 Betas from this order had been delivered. The final Beta from this order was delivered on 31 October 2019.

=== Elbląg ===
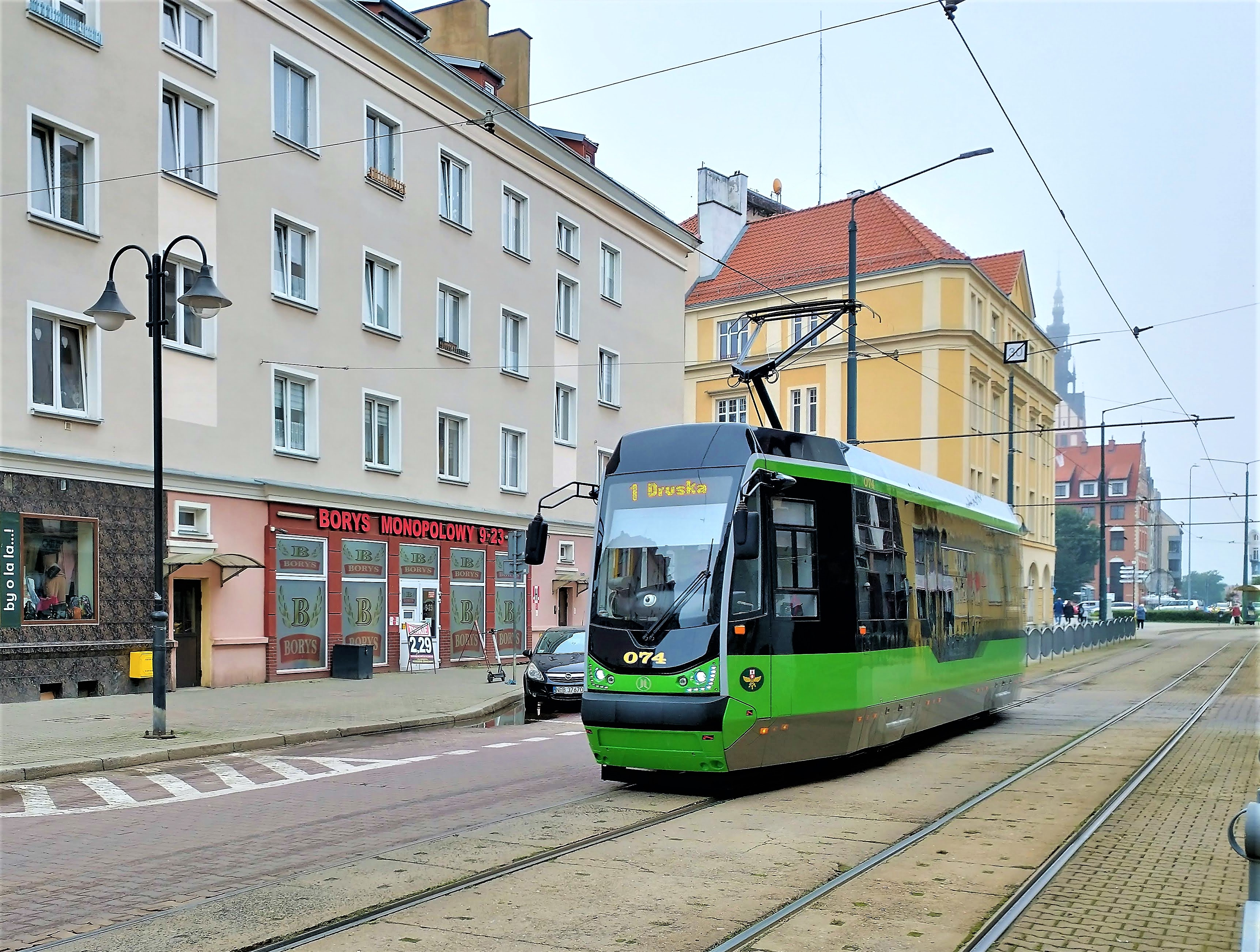
Moderus Beta MF 09 AC

In June 2017, a contract was signed for the delivery of 3 single-section Beta MF 09 AC trams for Elbląg, followed by a contract on 17 January 2019 for a fourth identical tram, and in January 2020 for a fifth. The first unit was ready in early November and was transported to Łódź for necessary tests prior to receiving its homologation certificate. During the night of January 19/20, two of the first trams arrived in Elbląg. By January 29, there were 4 trams in Elbląg, two of which had already been accepted. The last (fifth) tram was delivered in April 2021.

=== Grudziądz ===
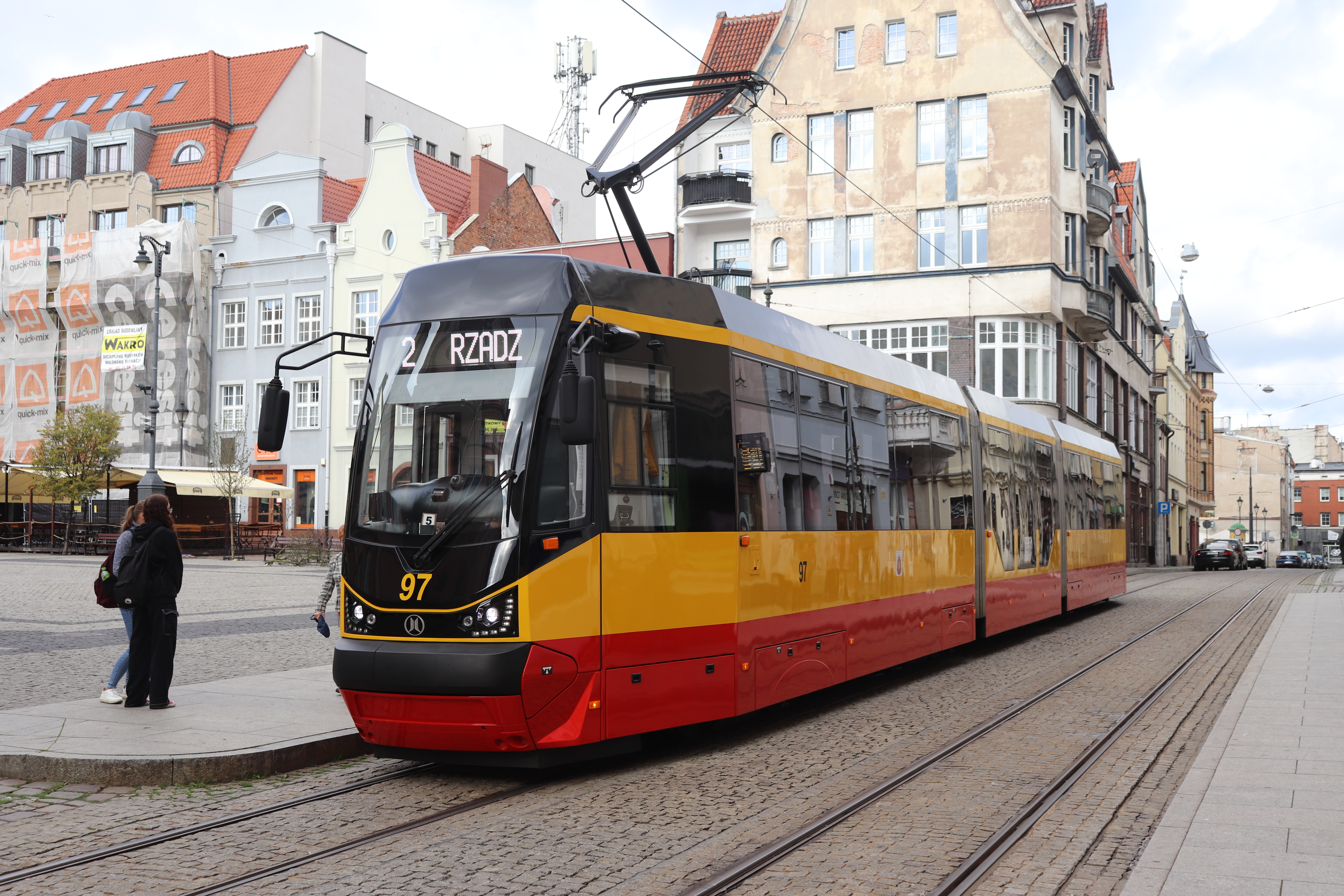
Moderus Beta MF 28 AC

On 25 March 2021, a contract was signed for the delivery of 4 Betas MF 28 AC for MZK Grudziądz. The first of the new trams was sent to Łódź for testing in early May 2022 and was delivered to Grudziądz during the night of 30/31 May 2022. Its official presentation took place on June 10. In early September, the first of the trams debuted in regular service, and two more were already in Grudziądz.
