= Moderus Alfa =

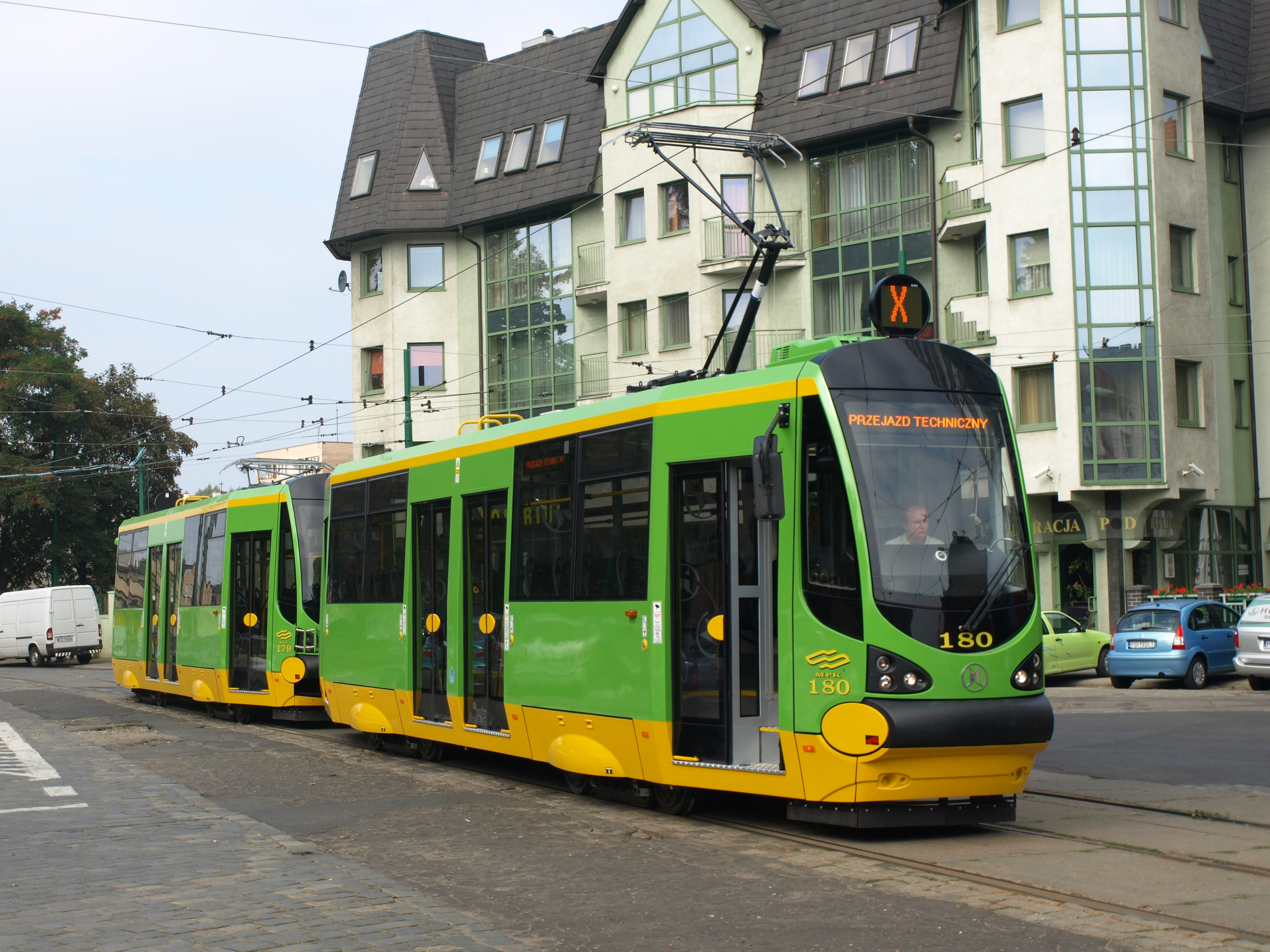
- Moderus Alfa HF07 in Poznań
- Manufacturer: Modertrans Poznań
- Constructed: since 2006
- Entered service: since 2006
- Number built: 157
- Capacity: 93–97 with 16–20 sitting places
- Operators: MPK Poznań; Tramwaje Szczecińskie; Tramwaje Śląskie

Specifications
- Car length: 13,500 millimetres (530 in)
- Width: 2,350 millimetres (93 in)
- Height: 3,350 millimetres (132 in)
- Floor height: 885 millimetres (34.8 in)
- Low-floor: 0%
- Maximum speed: 70 kilometres per hour (43 mph)
- Weight: 16,500 kilograms (36,400 lb)
- Track gauge: standard gauge (1,435 millimetres (56.5 in)

Moderus Alfa – a one-section one-directional high-floor tram model developed by retrofitting Konstal 105N/105Na tram, manufactured by Modertrans Poznań. These trams are operated in Silesian Interurbans, Poznań and Szczecin.

== History ==
In years 1973–1992 there were 980 units of Konstal 105N tram and 1443 units of Konstal 105Na tram produced which made them the most common used tram model in Poland. In 1990s the trams were so worn out and obsolete, that their operators had decided to modernize them.

On December 31, 2005, MPK Poznań – the public transport operator that previously modernized the trams by itself – created subsidiary company called Modertrans Poznań on the basis of Bus Repair Company in Biskupice (Polish: Zakład Napraw Autobusów w Biskupicach). Apart from that, scope of activity of Modertrans was expanded by trams modernization. In the initial period the main recipient of modernized trams was MPK Poznań. However, in December 2007 the first modernized vehicles were also delivered to Silesian Interurbans.

In 2011 the successor of Moderus Alfa was created – the three-section Moderus Beta MF 02 AC. That tram model is an equivalent of two-vehicle composition of Moderus Alfa, but in contrast to Moderus Alfa there are no old parts (it is entirely new vehicle) and has a low-floor module, thanks to which is a single-space unit and adapted to the transport of disabled people in wheelchairs.

== Construction ==
The Moderus Alfa trams are created through sophisticated modernization of old vehicles of Konstal 105N/105Na generation. The modernized design of vehicles was developed by EC Engineering from Kraków and applied for the first time in HF 04 AC and HF 05 models.

Individual versions differ significantly in the scope of modernization:

Scope of the modernizing of individual versions of Moderus Alfa trams
Type	Interior	Front and back	Drive	Doors	Number of doors	Air conditioning of motorman's cabin	Other
HF 01	Yes	–	–	–	4	–	–
HF 02 DK	Yes	–	–	–	4	–	bidirectional (Note: The tram is bidirectional, one-sided vehicle. The streetcars must always run in a couple, where the first one has a typical for 105Na series setting of doors and motorman's cabin, and the second one in the couple has the motorman's cabin in the end section. In effect, the tram can be used as a shuttle one on single-track tram way section.)
HF 03 L	Yes	–	–	–	4	–	training vehicle
HF 04 AC	Yes	Yes	Yes	new, rotary	4	Yes	–
HF 05	Yes	Yes	–	new drive	4	–	–
HF 07	Yes	Yes	–	new, rotary	4	Yes	–
HF 09	Yes	Yes	–	new, popup-sliding	3	Yes	–
HF 10 AC	Yes	Yes	Yes	new, popup-sliding	3	Yes	elimination of indentations of the body, new bogies
HF 11 AC	Yes	Yes	Yes	new drive	4	Yes	–

== Deliveries ==
Country	Place	Operator	Type	Years of delivery	No. of units
Poland	Poznań	MPK Poznań	HF 01	2006	22
Poland	Poznań	MPK Poznań	HF 02 DK	2006	2
Poland	Poznań	MPK Poznań	HF 03 L	2007	2
Poland	Poznań	MPK Poznań	HF 04 AC	2008	4
Poland	Poznań	MPK Poznań	HF 07	2008–2010	36
Poland	Katowice urban area	Tramwaje Śląskie	HF 05	2007	2
Poland	Katowice urban area	Tramwaje Śląskie	HF 11 AC	2012–2014	75
Poland	Szczecin	Tramwaje Szczecińskie	HF 09	2008	2
Poland	Szczecin	Tramwaje Szczecińskie	HF 10 AC	2011–2013	12
Total number:					157

== Exploitation ==
=== Poznań ===
In 2006, Modertrans have modernized 24 Konstal 105N/105Na trams for MPK Poznań. In scope of the modernization the 22 units of HF 01 model and 2 units of HF 02 DK model were made. Between July and August 2007 2 units of HF 03 L training tram were delivered.

In years 2008–2010 MPK received 4 units of HF 04 AC model and 36 units of HF 07 model. Because of the technological novelties, putting the first 4 trams into service was delayed on about six months – it was planned that the first tram would be ready to carry passengers in December 2007.

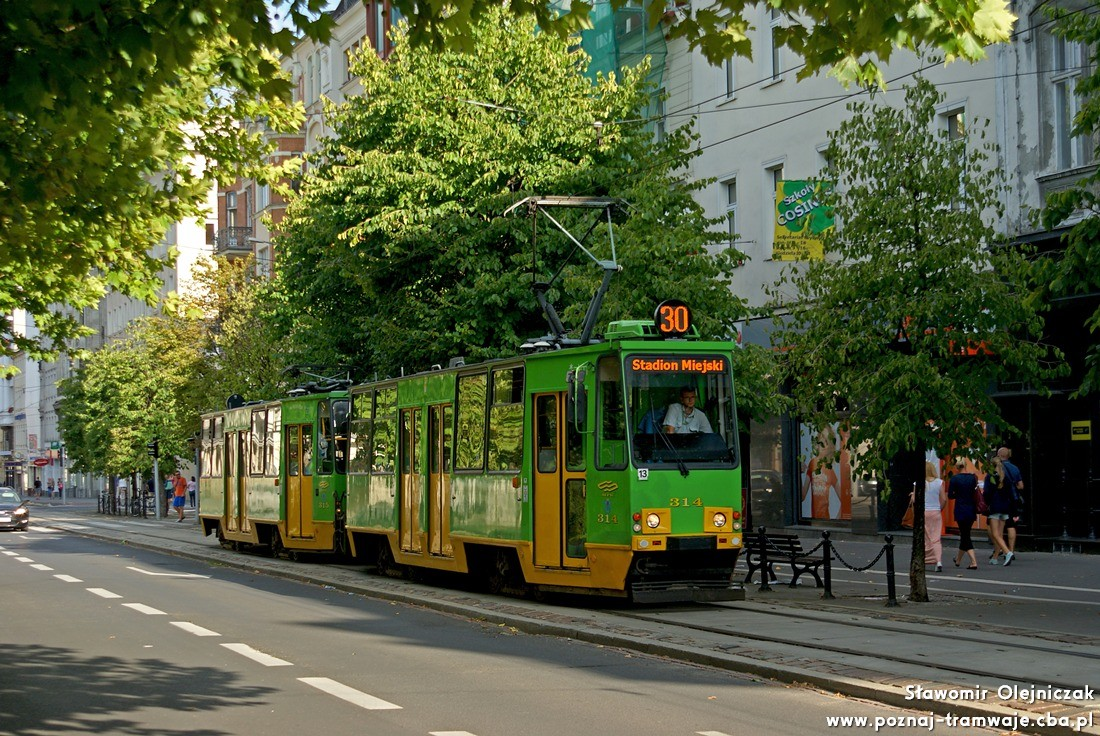
Alfa HF 01

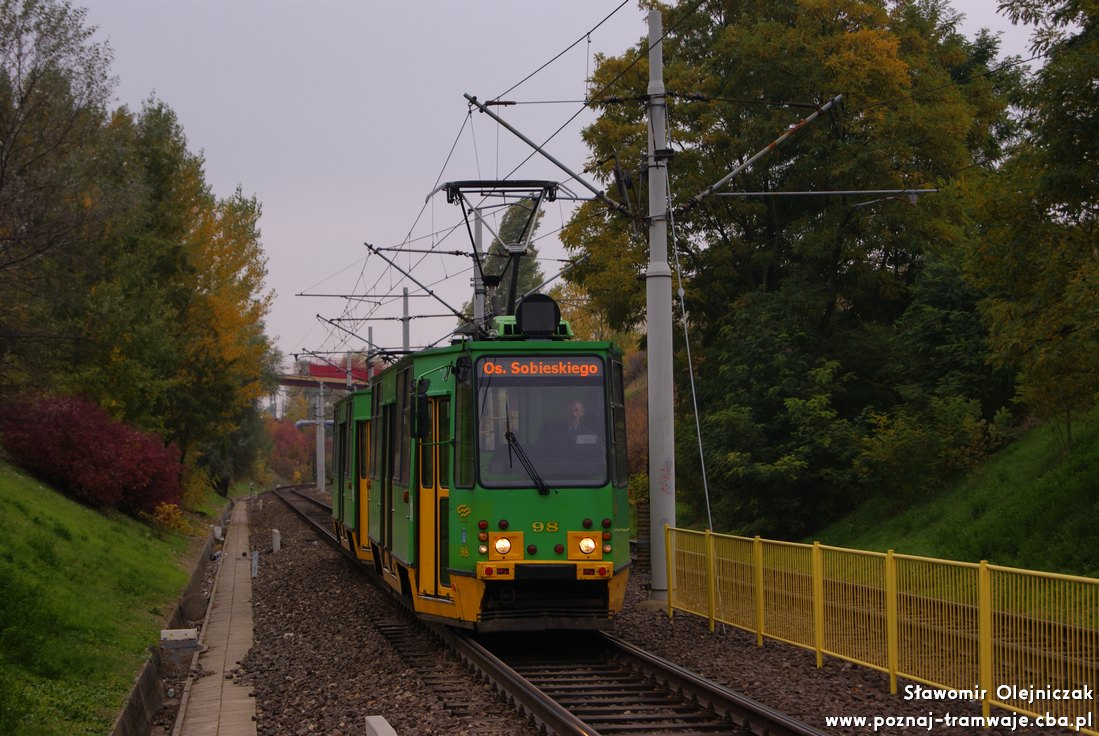
Alfa HF 02 DK

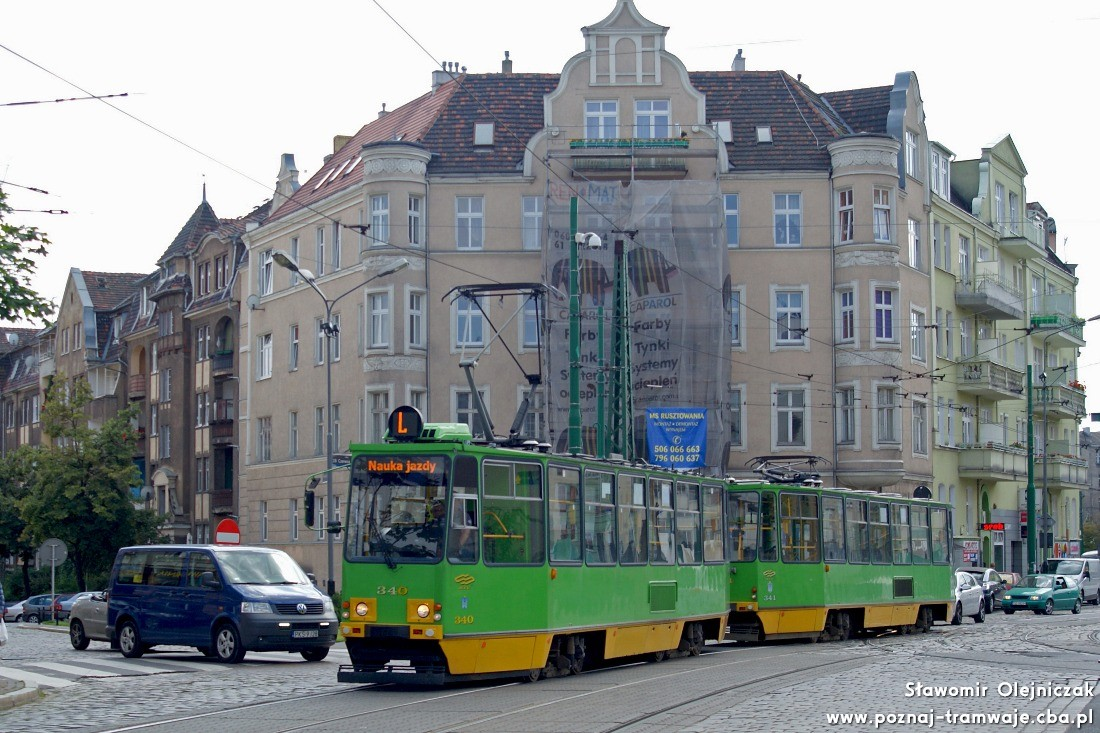
Alfa HF 03 L

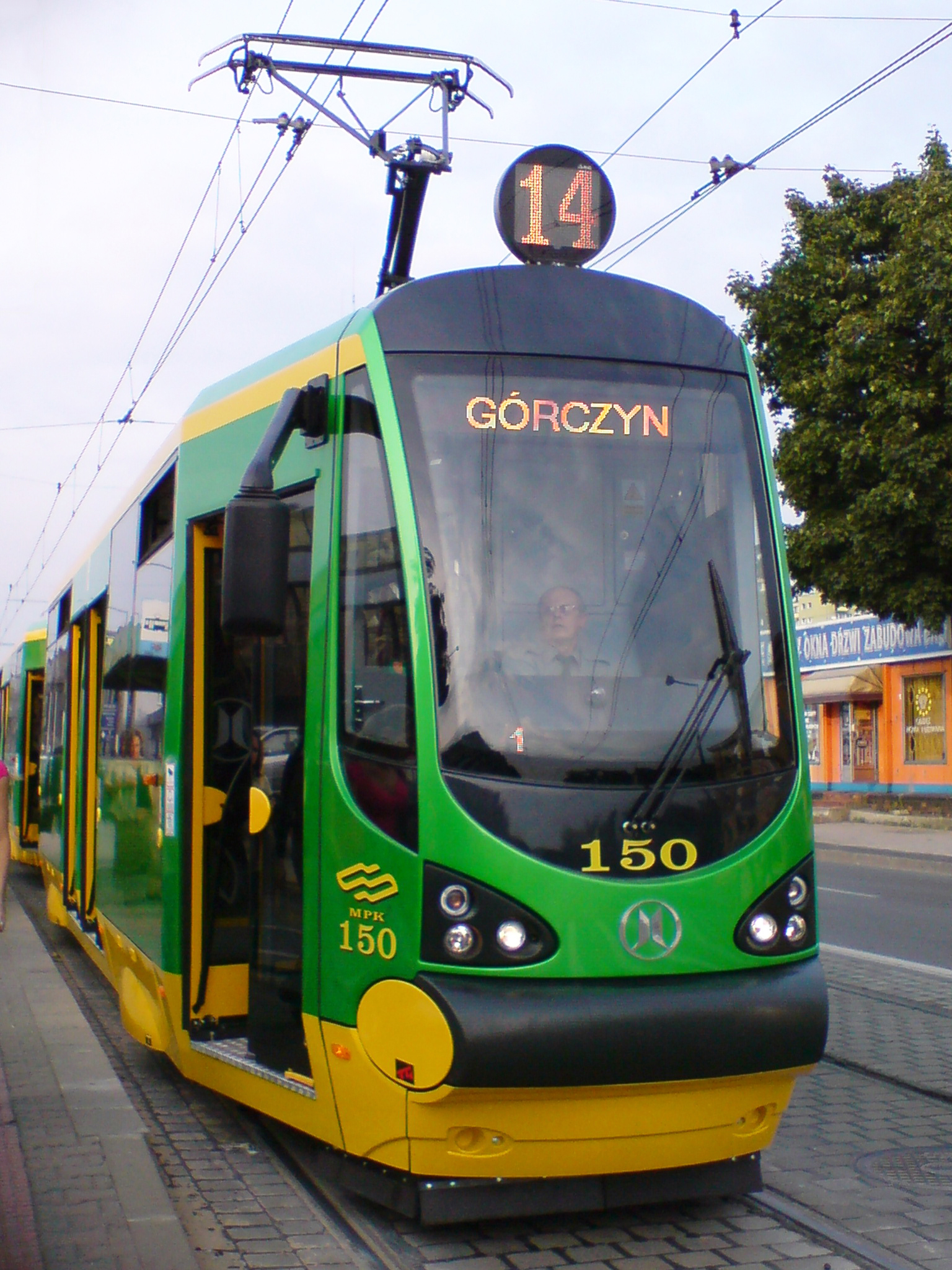
Alfa HF 04 AC

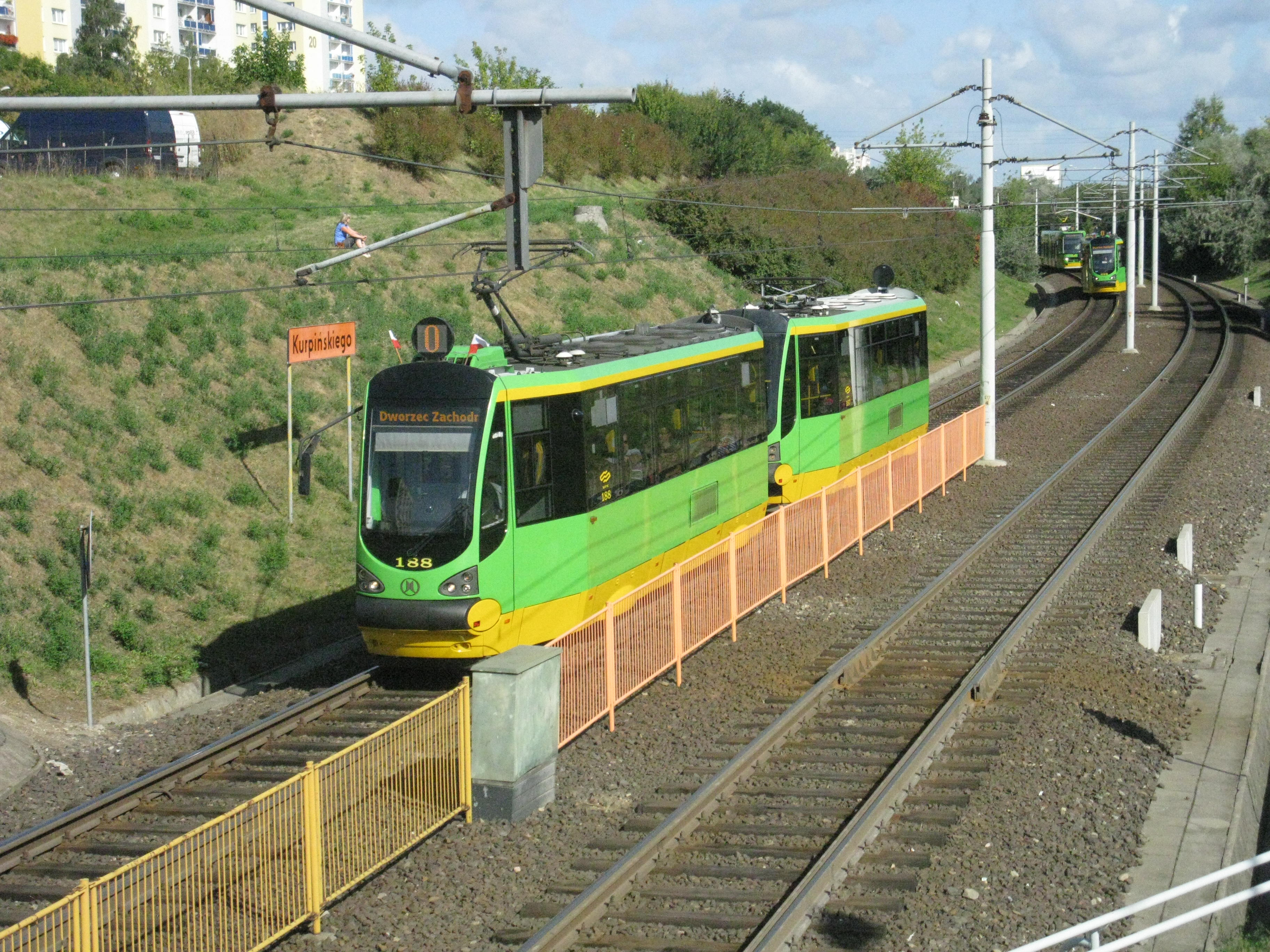
Alfa HF 07

=== Katowice urban area ===
In December 2007 Modertrans passed on 2 modernized trams, designated as HF 05 to Tramwaje Śląskie. One of them has been associated with the depot in Gliwice, while the other one went to the depot in Będzin.

On July 30, 2012, Tramwaje Śląskie signed a contract with Modertrans and MPK-Łódź consortium for modernizing 45 units of 105Na trams and delivering parts for modernizing another 30 units that was planned to happen in Repair and Service Department of Tramwaje Śląskie (Polish: Zakład Usługowo Remontowy Tramwajów Śląskich, ZUR). On December 17, Tramwaje Śląskie exhibited the first of modernized trams by Modertrans and MPK-Łódź consortium, and in May 2013 the first tram modernized by ZUR was ready. On November 18, 2013 the last of 45 units modernized by Modertrans and MPK-Łódź consortium was delivered to Silesia. Trams modernized by Modertrans and MPK were designated as 105N HF 11 AC and the ones modernized by ZUR as 105NF.

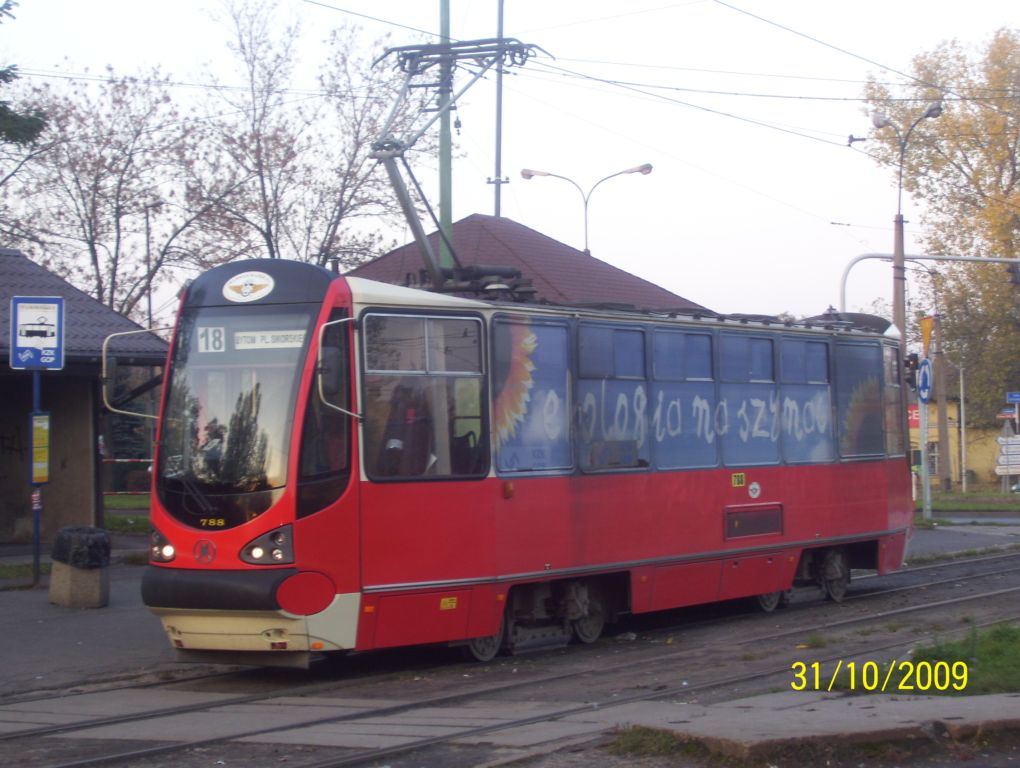
Alfa HF 05

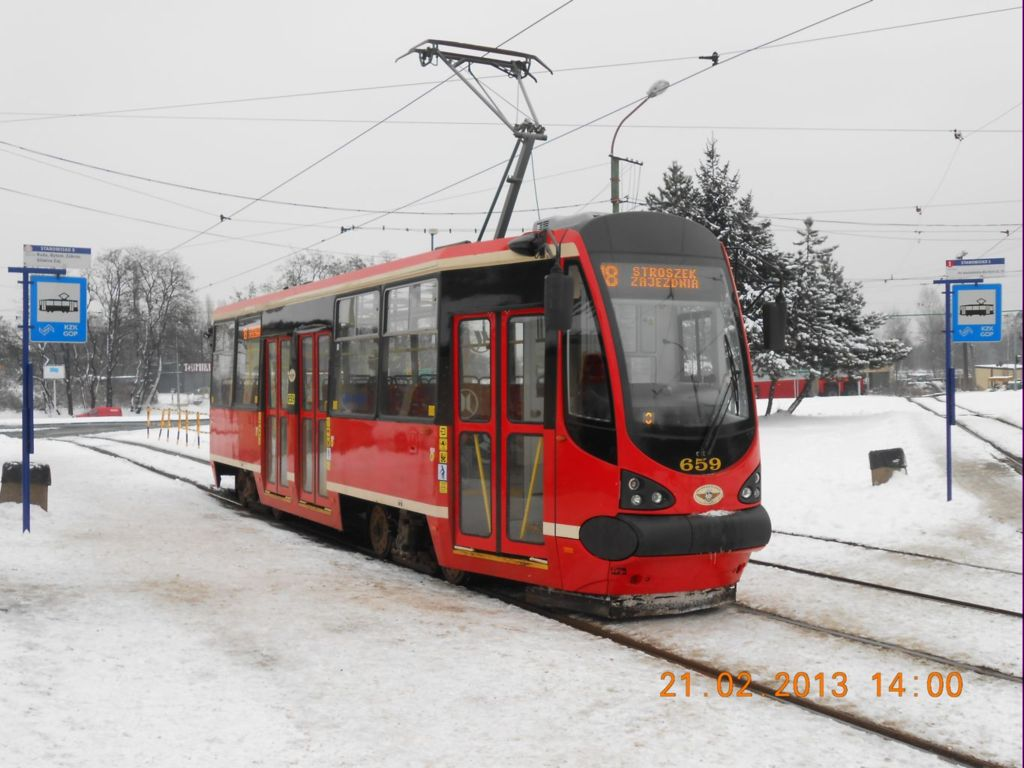
Alfa HF 11 AC

=== Szczecin ===
In 2008 Tramwaje Szczecińskie bought two bodies of HF 09 trams, that were equipped in local workshops.

In December 2010 subsequent 2 Moderus bodies with bogies were transported from Poznań to Szczecin, which were completed and equipped in Szczecin. On June 22, 2011 a composition of the two streetcars was exhibited.

On June 7, 2011 the operator signed another contract with Modertrans – that one was for delivery of 10 bodies and 20 drive bogies. In total, Tramwaje Szczecińskie bought 7 compositions of two Moderus Alfa streetcars that were assigned to Golęcin depot. 4 units were paid with the operator's own funds and 10 remaining as part of co-financing from the European Union.

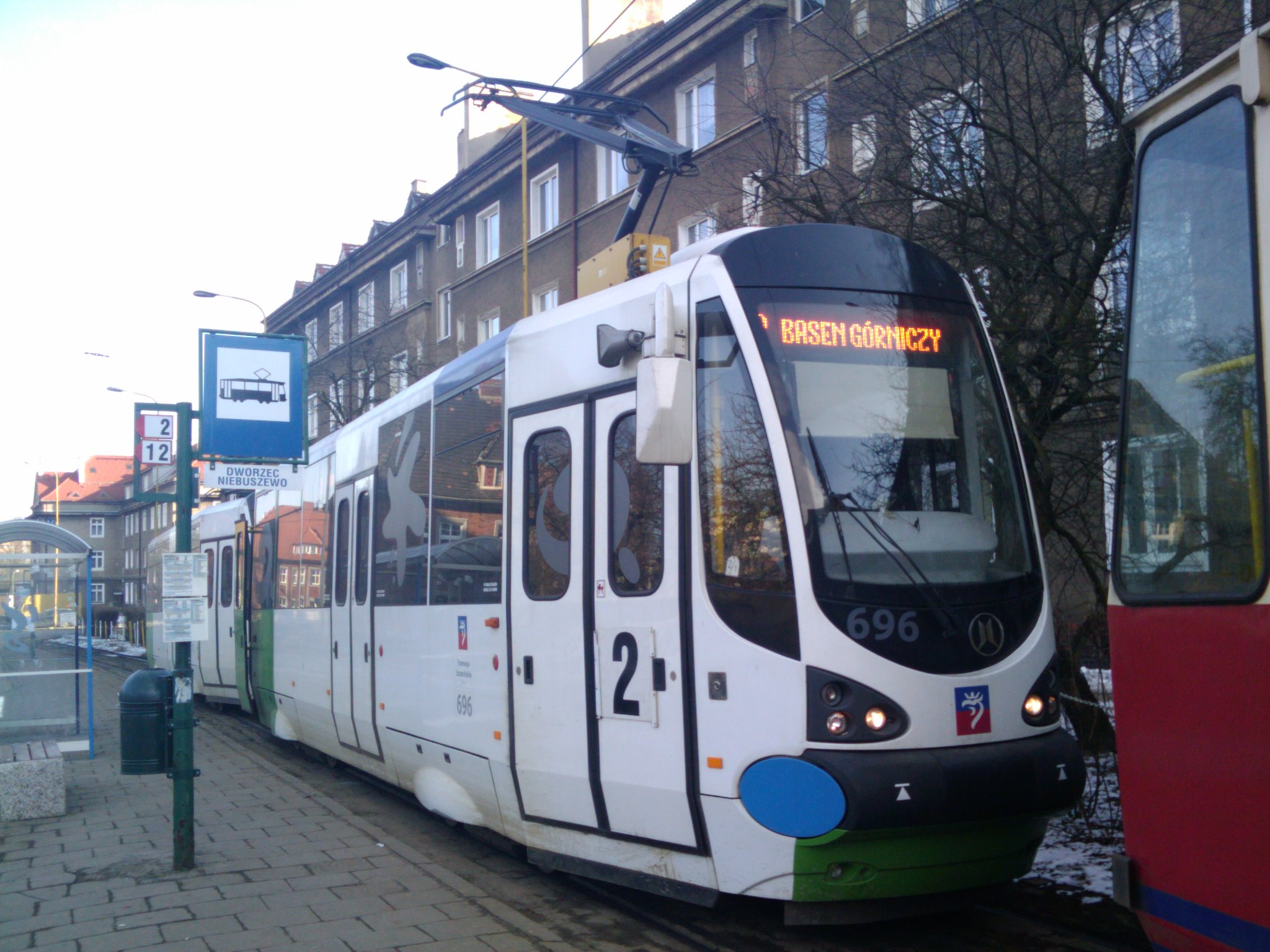
Alfa HF 09 for Szczecin

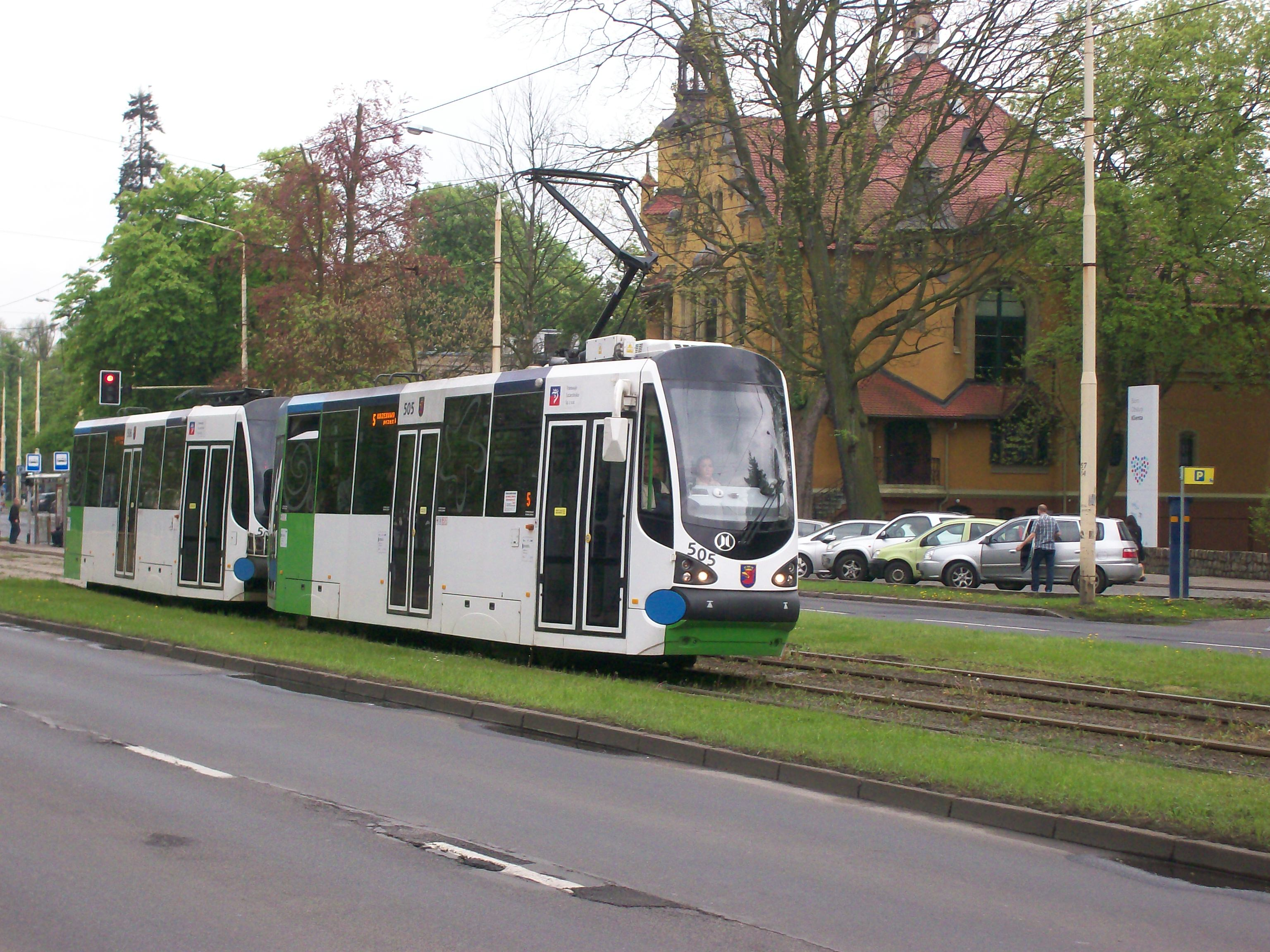
Alfa HF 10 AC for Szczecin

Moderus Alfa HF 09
Sounds of Moderus Alfa HF 09

== See also ==
- Konstal 105NaDK
- Moderus Beta
- Moderus Gamma
