= Tramwaje Szczecińskie =

Tram transport company in Szczecin, Poland

- Genre: Private limited company
- Founded: 1 January 2009
- Headquarters: Szczecin, Polska
- Area served: Szczecin
- Key people: Krystian Wawrzyniak
- Services: Public transport
- Total equity: 81 499 500 zł
- Website: http://www.ts.szczecin.pl/

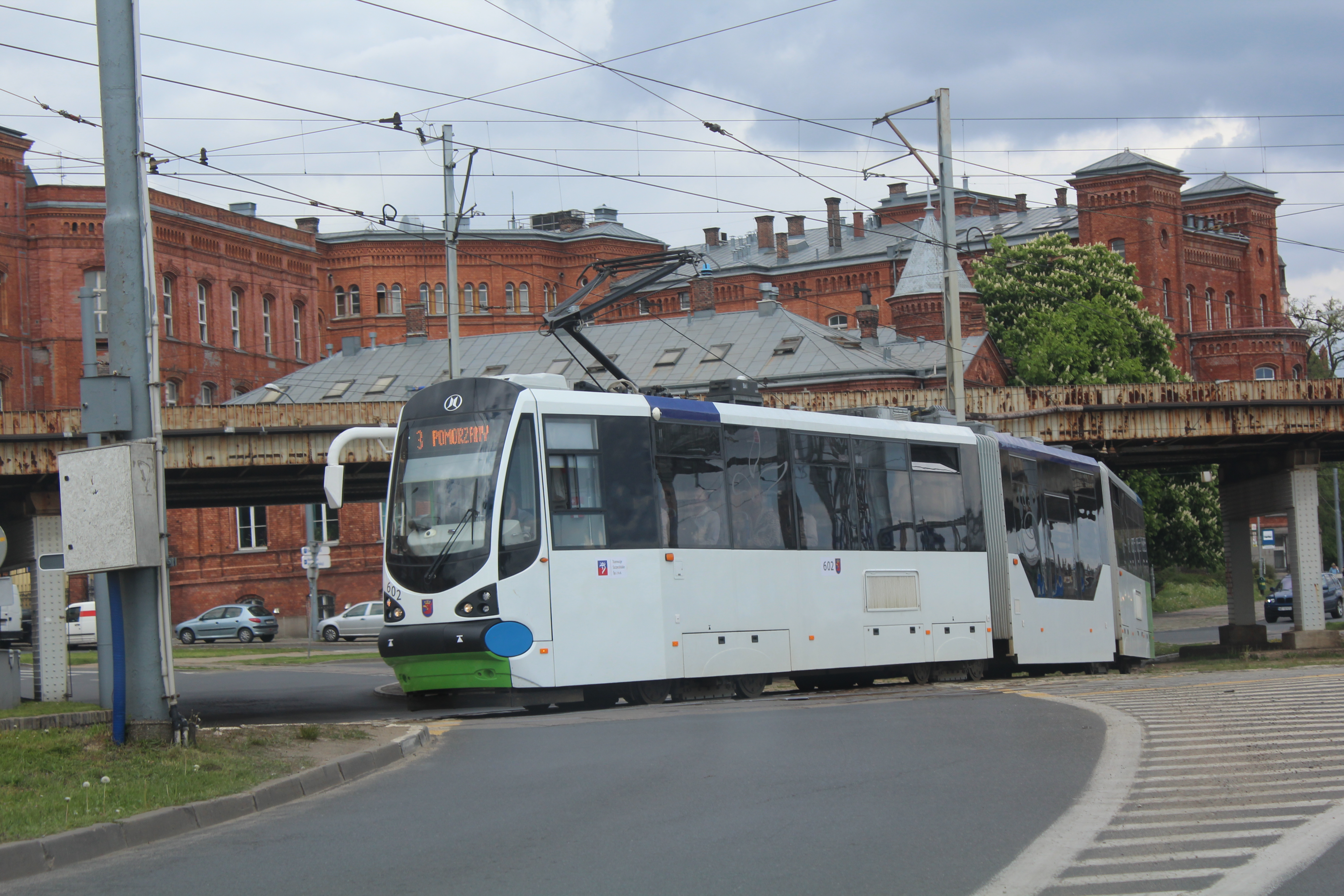
Moderus Beta tram owned by the company

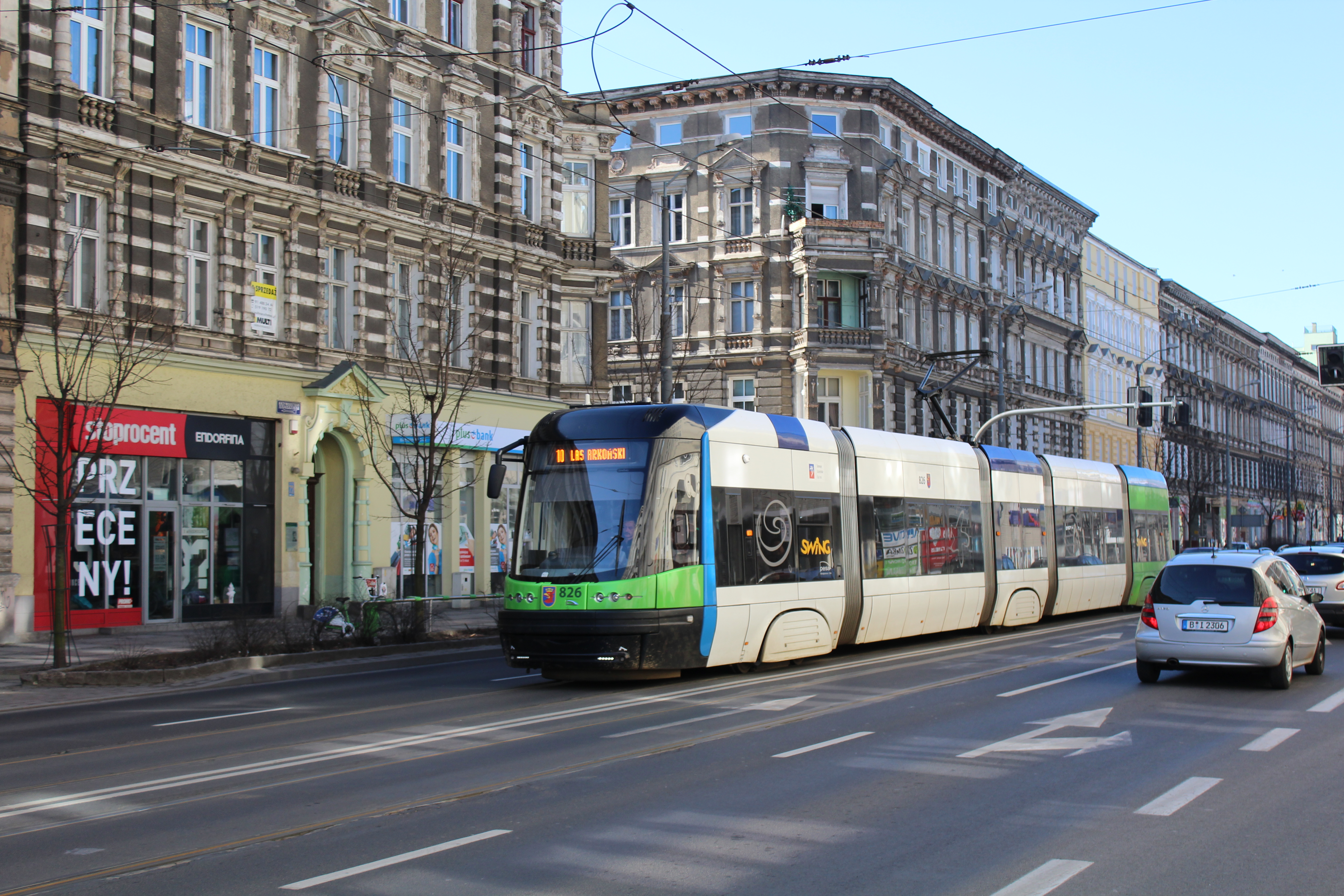
PESA 120Na in Szczecin

The Tramwaje Szczecińskie (Polish for Szczecin Trams) is a tram transport company of Szczecin, the capital city of West Pomeranian Voivodeship in Poland. It manages the city's tram network. Company was established on 1 January 2009, as a result of transforming previous company, MZK Szczecin.

The company deals with:

- serving tram transport within the borders of city Szczecin.
- leading repairs, maintenance and modernisation of tram vehicles and other devices and equipment.
- managing entrusted property

== Tram vehicles ==
The company currently possesses following types of trams:

Type	In use since	Number of cars	Depot Pogodno	Depot Golęcin
Konstal 105Na	1981	2	X	2
Konstal 105Ng/S	2000	12	X	12
Konstal 105N2K/2000	2001	20	X	20
Moderus Alfa (MZK 105N/S/HF/09 i 105N/S/HF10AC)	2010	14 (including trailers)	X	14
Moderus Beta MF 15 AC	2014/2015	4	4	X
Tatra KT4Dt	2006	73	73	X
Tatra T6A2D	2008	48	14	34
PESA 120NaS	2010/2011	6	6	X
PESA 120NaS2	2013	22	22	X
Total		201	119	82

Low-floor rolling stock can be found on the lines : 2, 3, 5, 7, 8, 10, 12.

== Sources ==
- official website of Tramwaje Szczecińskie
- http://www.mkm.szczecin.pl/
