= Trams in Grudziądz =

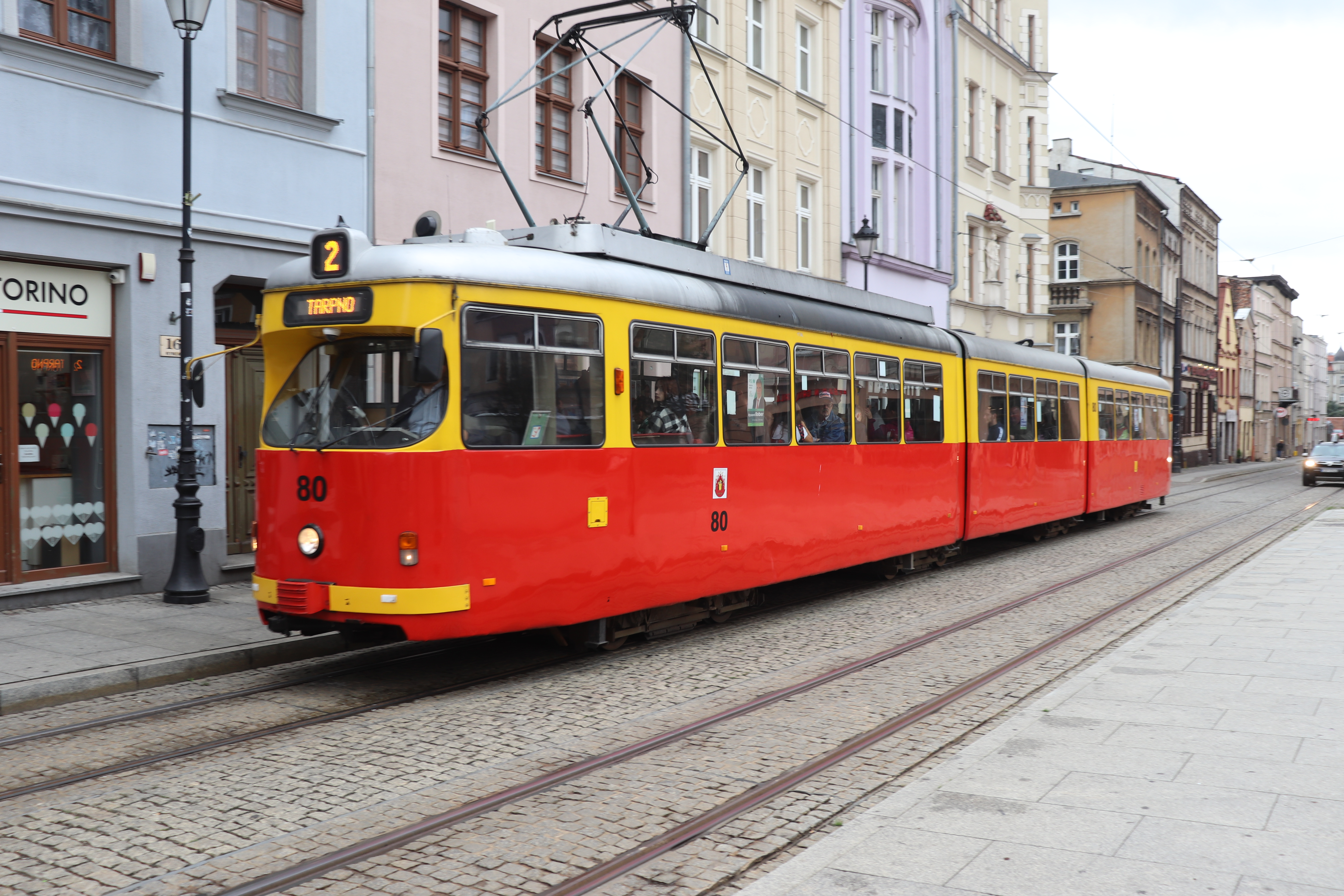
- Düwag GT8 in Grudziądz, 2023

Operation
- Locale: Grudziądz, Poland

Statistics
Horsecar era: 1896–1899
- Propulsion system: Horses
- Track length (total): 3.05 km (1.90 mi)
Electric trams era: 1899–present
- Status: Operational
- Routes: 1
- Operator: MZK Grudziądz
- Track gauge: 1,000 mm (3 ft 3 3/8 in)
- Propulsion system: Electricity
- Electrification: 700 V DC parallel overhead lines
- Depot: Dworcowa
- Stock: 4x Modertrans Moderus Beta MF 28 AC; 5x Duewag GT8; 2x Konstal 805Nb; 2x Konstal 805Na; 6x Konstal 805Na-MM
- Track length (total): 9 km (5.6 mi)
- Website: https://mzk.grudziadz.pl/

The Grudziądz tram system is a tram system in Grudziądz, Poland, that has been in operation since 1896. Currently, the system is operated by Miejski Zakład Komunikacji w Grudziądzu (MZK Grudziądz). There is a single 9-kilometre (5.6 mi) line in regular operation. Grudziądz is the smallest city in Poland to have an independent tram system. The tram line underwent modernization in 2021, and four Moderus Beta low-floor trams were supplied in 2022.

== History ==
=== Horse trams ===
Stra-enbahn Graudenz, Carl Behn & launched a horse-drawn tram system in 1896 to transport visitors from the train station to the fairgrounds of the Co West-preussische Gewerbe-Ausstellung (West Prussian Trade Exhibition). The tram track covered a distance of 3km and formed most of the modern-day northern section of the tram line.

The line was to be operated by six horse tram carts. The opening ceremony took place on 13 June 1896, the day before the opening of the exhibition.

=== Electrifcation ===
In 1897, the Grudziądz tramway was bought by the owner of the power plant in Grudziądz, "Nordische Elektrizitäts-Gesellschaft in Danzig", which aimed to electrify the horse tram. A new company was created, and work began with the reconstruction of the power plant. At the same time, the original horse tram route was extended by 0.7 km in ul. Legions to Tarpno. Due to the tight course of the old city, most of the sections were single track, with occasional double track sections at stations for passing. The official opening of the electric tram line took place on 12 May 1899. The route was operated by 6 motor cars, while horse-drawn tram trucks were converted into trailer wagons. In 1900, the city authorities bought the power plant and the tram line. The company “Städtische Elektrizitätswerk und Straßenbahn Graudenz”. In 1911, a second 1.6 km long tram line was built and launched. The route ran from the Grain Market Square (current al. 23 January) through Toruńska and Chełmno streets to the intersection with Bydgoska Street. Two years later, it was extended by 0.5 km to the south. The outbreak of World War I resulted in the suspension of operation on the line, as it was modified to carry wounded soldiers away from the front and to transfer weapons from the manufactories to the train station.

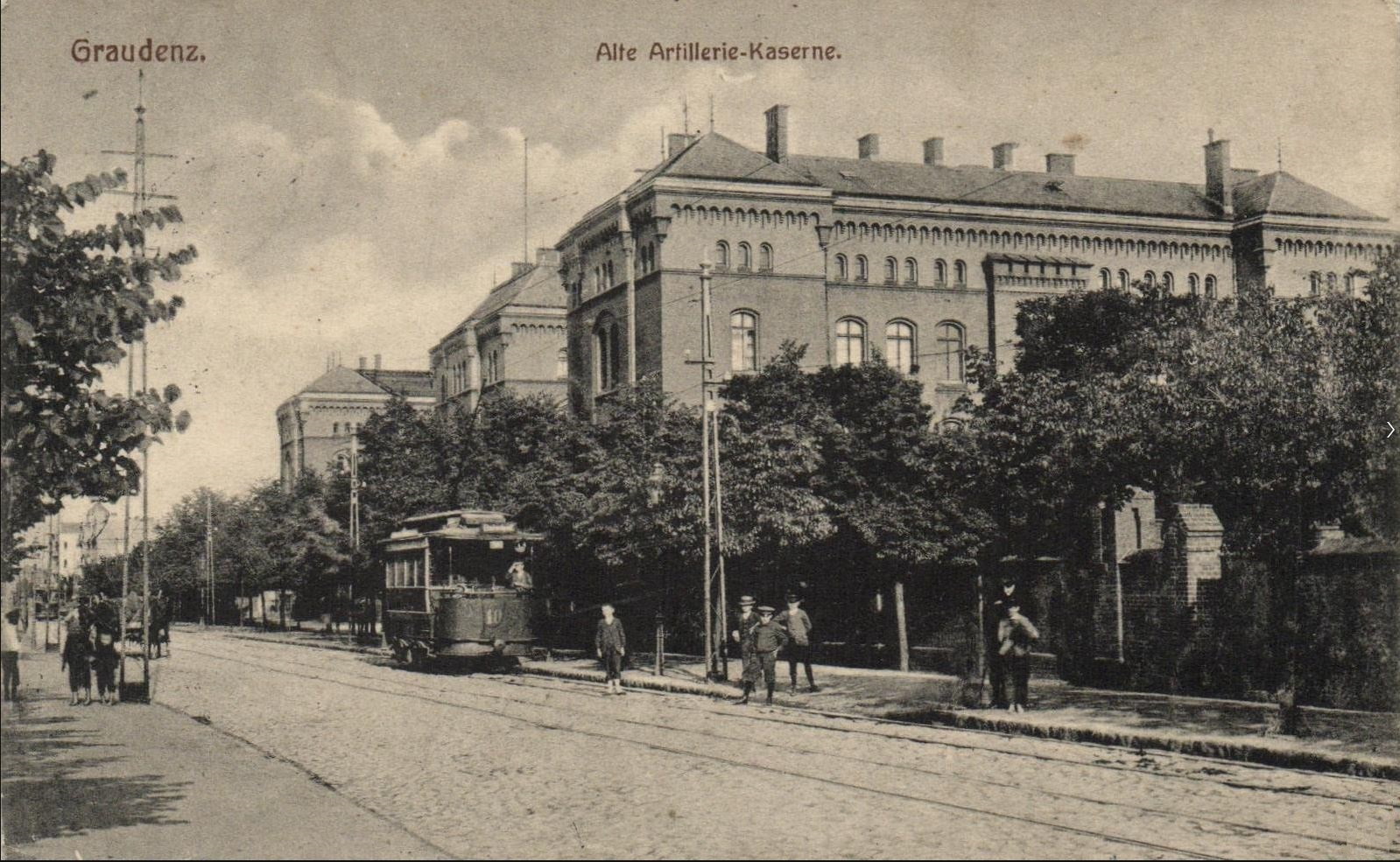
Tram in Grudziądz in 1910

=== Polish ownership ===
On 23 January 1920, Grudziądz was officially taken over by the Polish administration under the Treaty of Versailles. This also included trams, the new company was called “Miejskie Tramwaje, Elektrownia i Wodociągi”.. In 1929, the track was extended by 0.35 km in ul. Chełmńska to the newly opened shooting range. In 1938, this line was extended by 2.2 km to ul. South, reaching a length of 4.65 km, while the length of both lines was 8.4 km. Due to this expansion, Grudziądz received a connection with a popular swimming pool on Lake Rudnicki Wielki. This southern section was only used during the spring and summer.

After the Battle of Grudziądz during the first days of World War II, the city was taken over by the German Army and ran as usual until January 23rd, 1945, when the city was taken over by the Soviet Army.

=== 1945–1989 ===
The tram system was almost entirely destroyed during the fighting at the end of the war. Most of the rolling stock was damaged or destroyed, and the electric infrastructure on the route was also damaged. It took until November 20, 1945, for the northern section of the line to resume operation; the southern section took even longer to repair and did not reopen until February 16, 1946. In 1954, MPK Grudziądz, the current owner of the tramline, was founded and took over full control of the line.

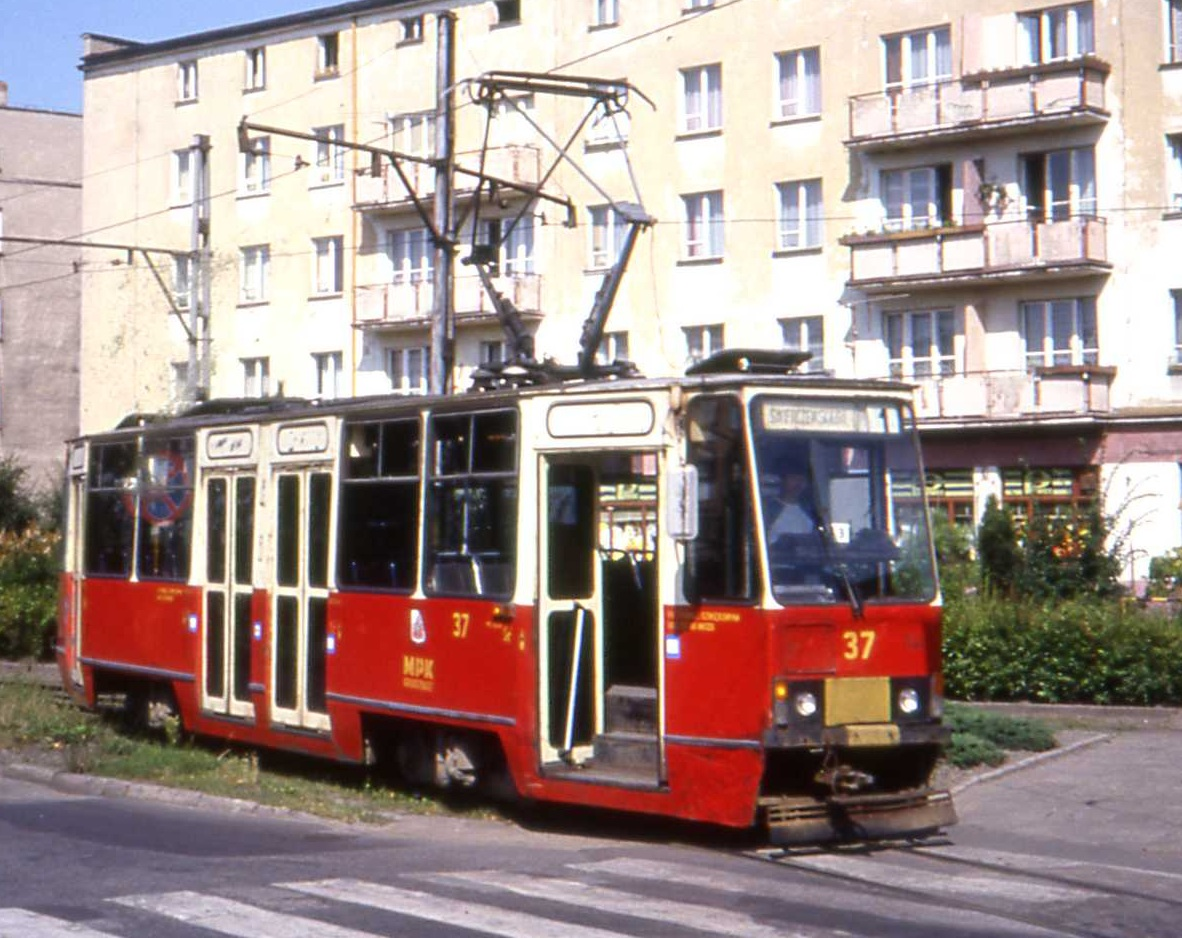
Konstal 805N in 1990

On July 21, 1978, construction of a single-track route to Mninszek was completed. Mninszek contained most of the industrial buildings in Grudziądz, including the metal foundry. The construction was crude, and the tram tracks were built on the ground, unpaved. The new section was 1.9 km long, however, the line experienced many difficulties, including the derailment of trams and high costs of repairs. After a year of operation (In 1979), the section was abandoned. In 1980, a small 150-meter spur line was built north of the train station. The purpose of this spur was to aid in the stationing of trams in the depot.

=== Since 1990 ===
In 1993, a huge fire destroyed the entire tram depot and all of the rolling stock that was stationed inside. This led the city to have to purchase used rolling stock from Warsaw and Germany.

At the beginning of 2009, the city secured a deal with the European Union to modernize the line, The EU would match 50% of the funds required to modernize the line. The modernization involved upgrading the electrification, as well as improving the tram track itself.

A second modernization began in 2020. This modernization involved upgrading many of the single-track sections to double-track sections and modernizing the rolling stock.

== Lines ==
Line	Route	Length in km	Average time to circuit (minutes)	Number of stops	Frequency	Notes
	Tarpno ↔ Rządz Legionów – Wybickiego – Stara – Miłośników Astronomii – Długa – Rynek – Szewska – Klasztorna – Al. 23 Stycznia – Toruńska – Chełmińska – Południowa – Konstytucji 3 Maja	~9 km	20 min	15	Weekdays; 10 Weekends; 20	Trams departing and returning to the Depot run on the track near the train station. This is shown in pink on the map.

== Rolling stock ==
Image	Tram type	Number	Low-Floor
	Konstal 805Na/Nb	2	No
	Konstal 805Na-MM (modernised 805Na)	6	No
	Duewag GT8	5	No
	Moderus Beta MF 28 AC	7	Yes
Total		20	35%

== Gallery ==
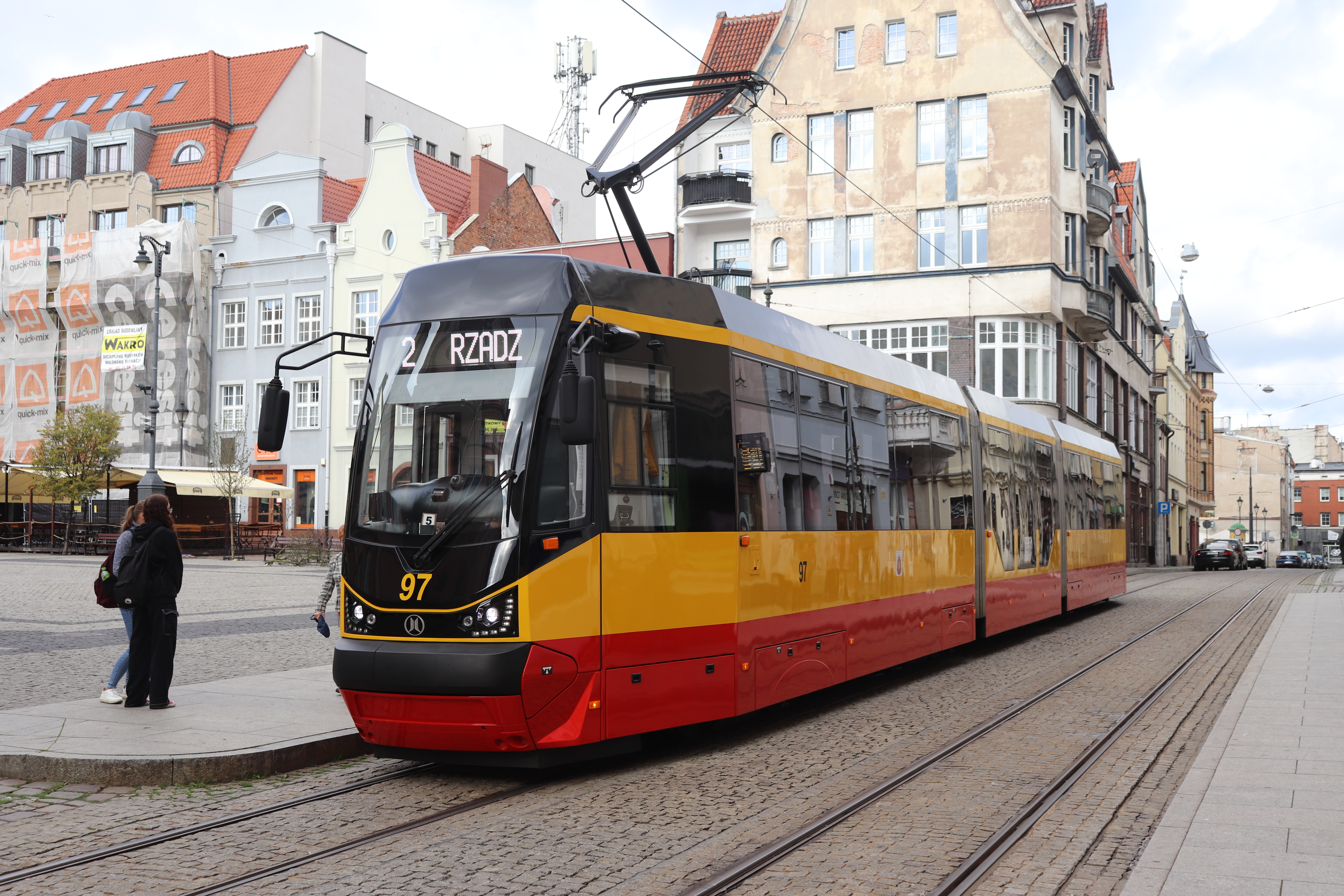
Moderus in the Old Town

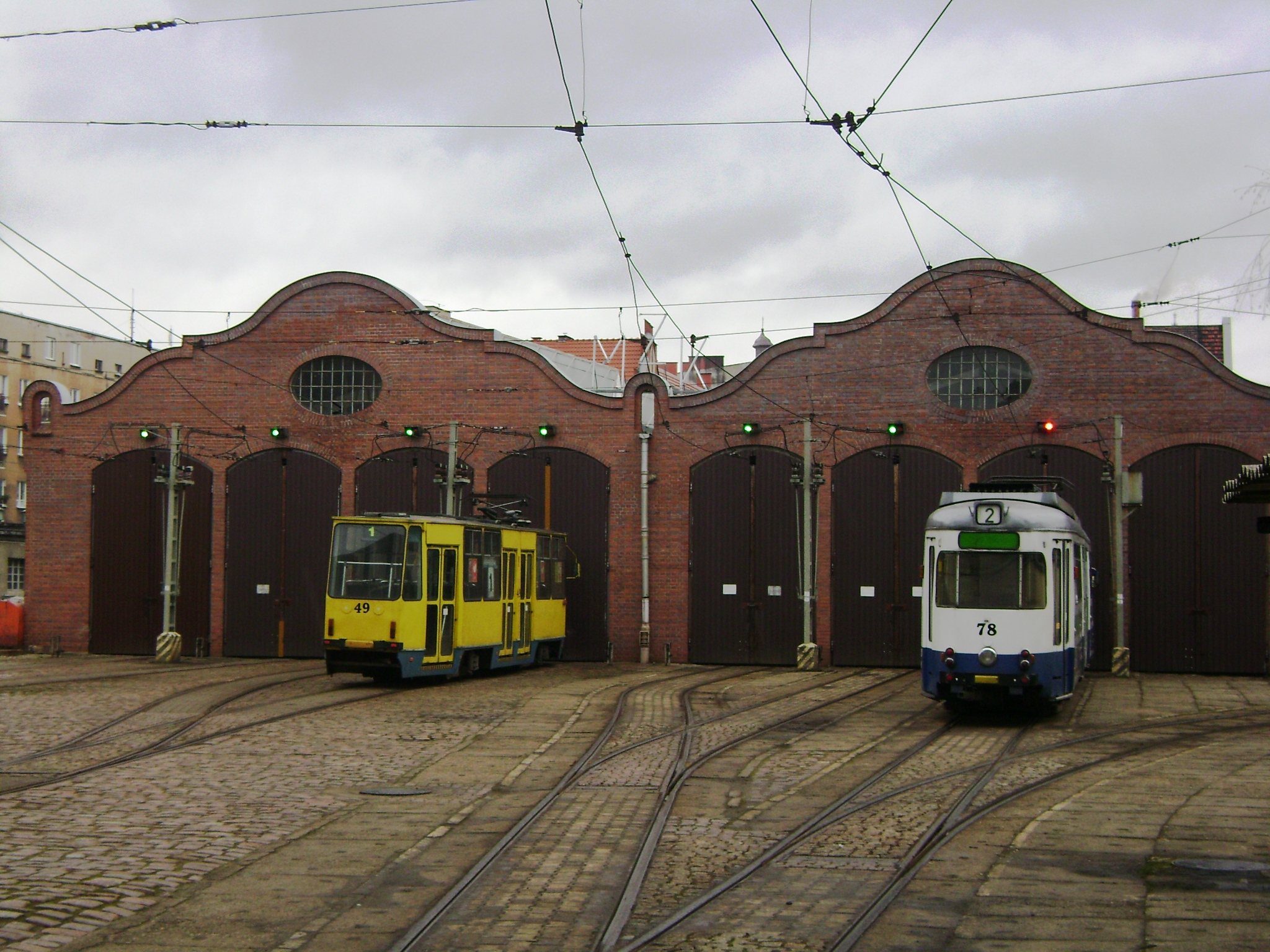
Tram Depot near the Railway Station

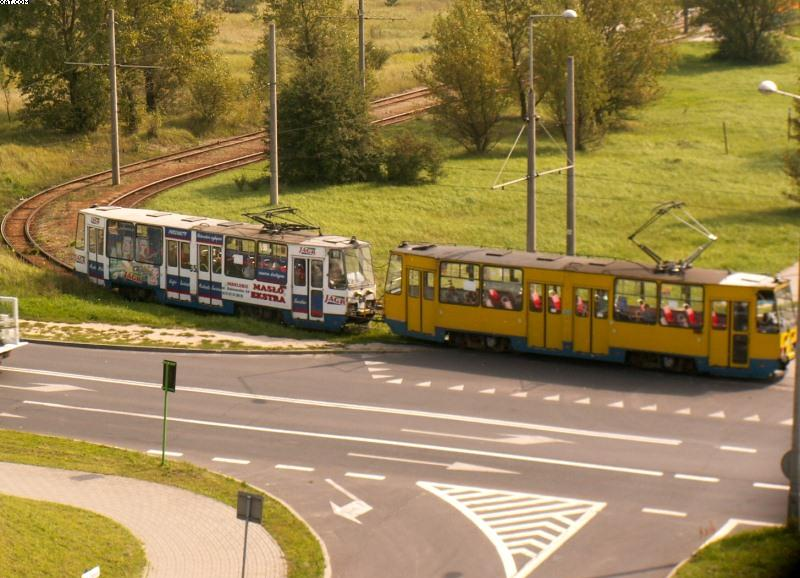
Konstal 805Na in Pre-modernization paintscheme (2008)

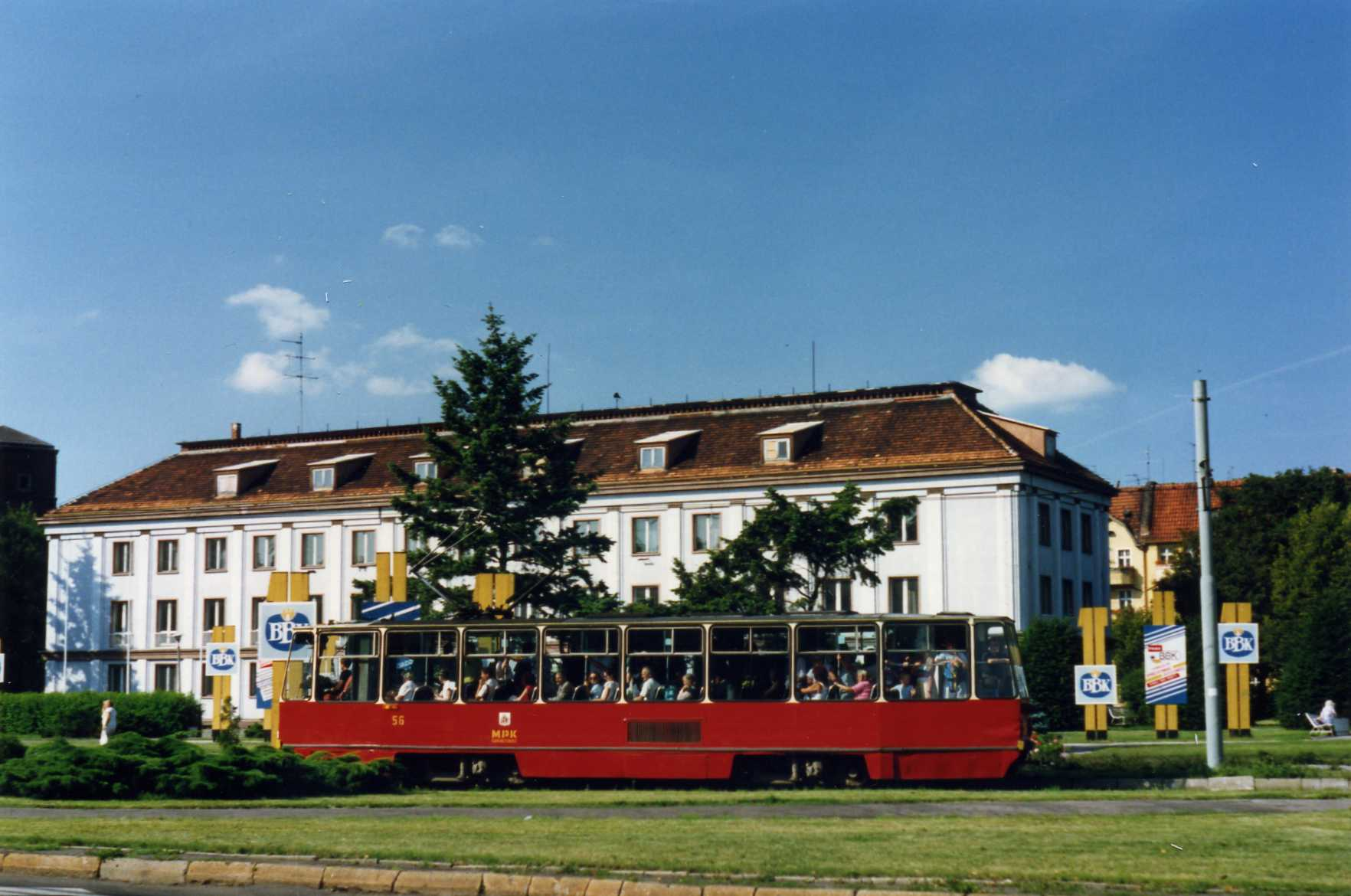
Konstal 805Na in 1990

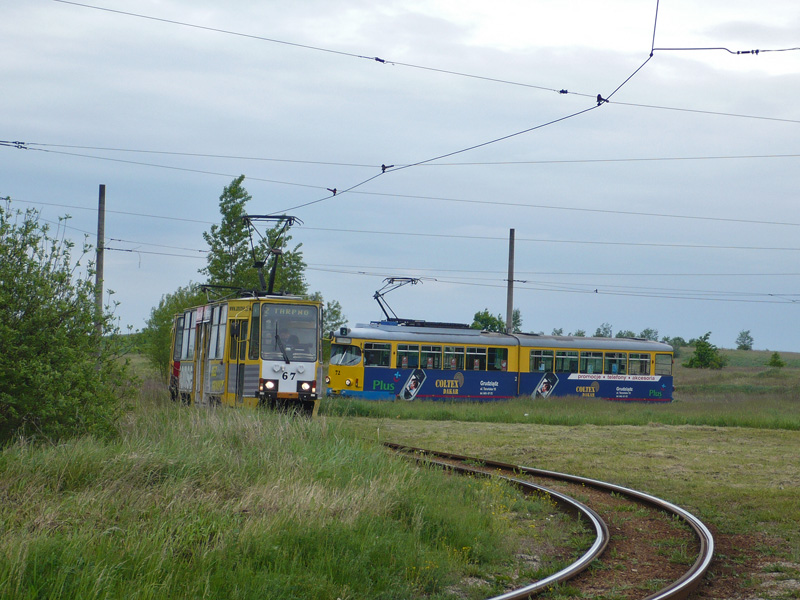
Konstal805Na and DuewagGT8 in 2008
