= Biskupice, Poznań County =

Biskupice
- Village
- Location within Poland
- Coordinates: 52°27′42″N 17°10′10″E
- Country: Poland
- Voivodeship: Greater Poland
- County: Poznań
- Gmina: Pobiedziska
- Population: 1,896 (2,011).

Biskupice ([biskuˈpit͡sɛ]; German: Biskupitz) is a village in the administrative district of Gmina Pobiedziska, within Poznań County, Greater Poland Voivodeship, in west-central Poland.
