= Modertrans Poznań =

Polish transportation company

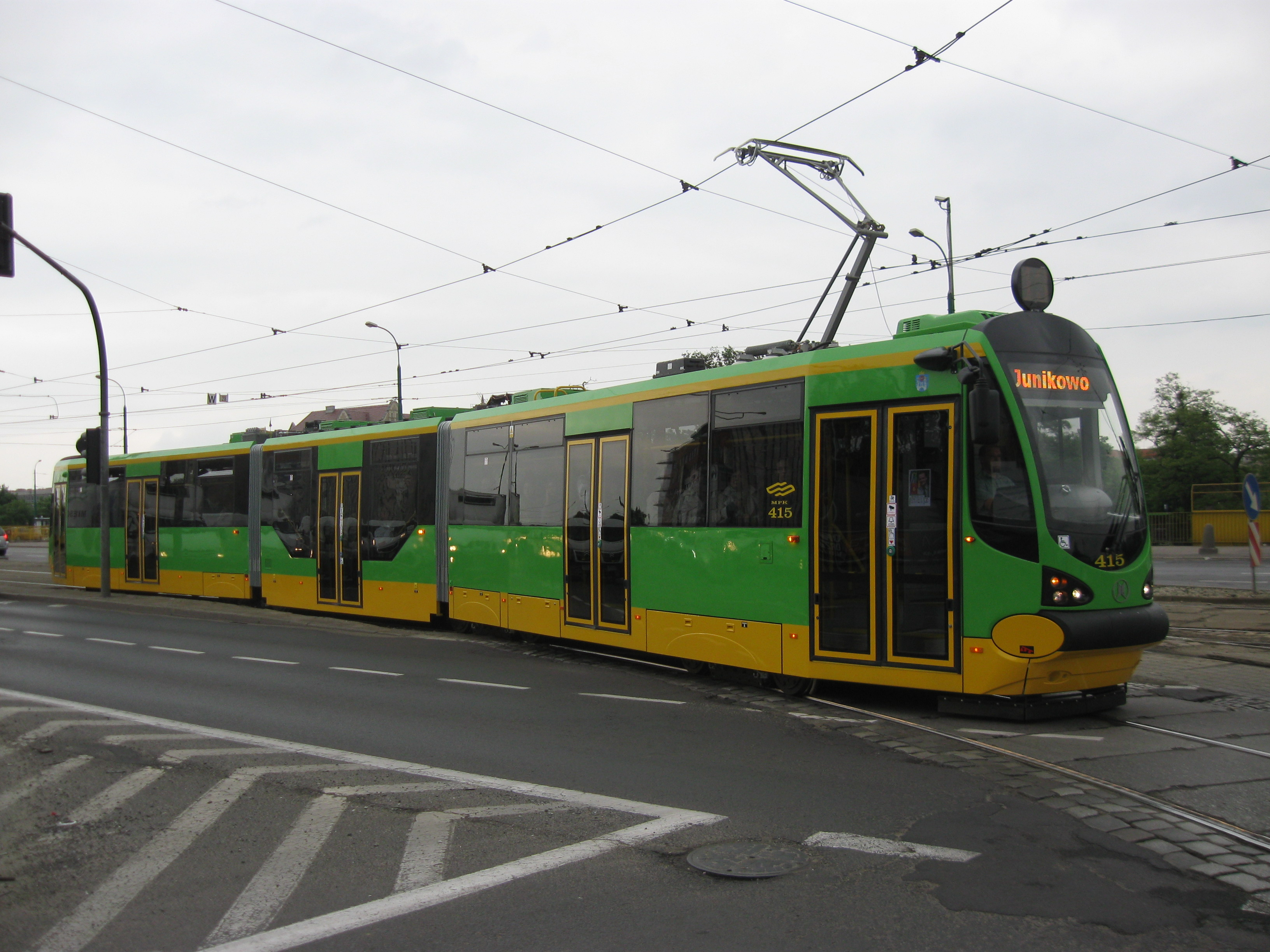
- Type: private
- Founded: December 31, 2005; 20 years ago
- Headquarters: Poznań, Poland
- Key people: Jarosław Bakinowski (CEO)
- Total equity: 28,628,000 PLN
- Website: www.modertrans.pl

Modertrans Poznań is a subsidiary of the Municipal Transport Company in Poznań (MPK Poznań), specializing in the production, modernization, design, regeneration, and servicing of rail vehicles and buses. It was established on 31 December 2005 through the merger of the Bus Repair Plant in Biskupice and the Tram Repair Department of MPK Poznań. The shareholders of the company are MPK Poznań (holding 75.92% of the shares) and the Bus Repair Plant (holding 24.08% of the shares), which is owned by the city of Poznań.

== History ==
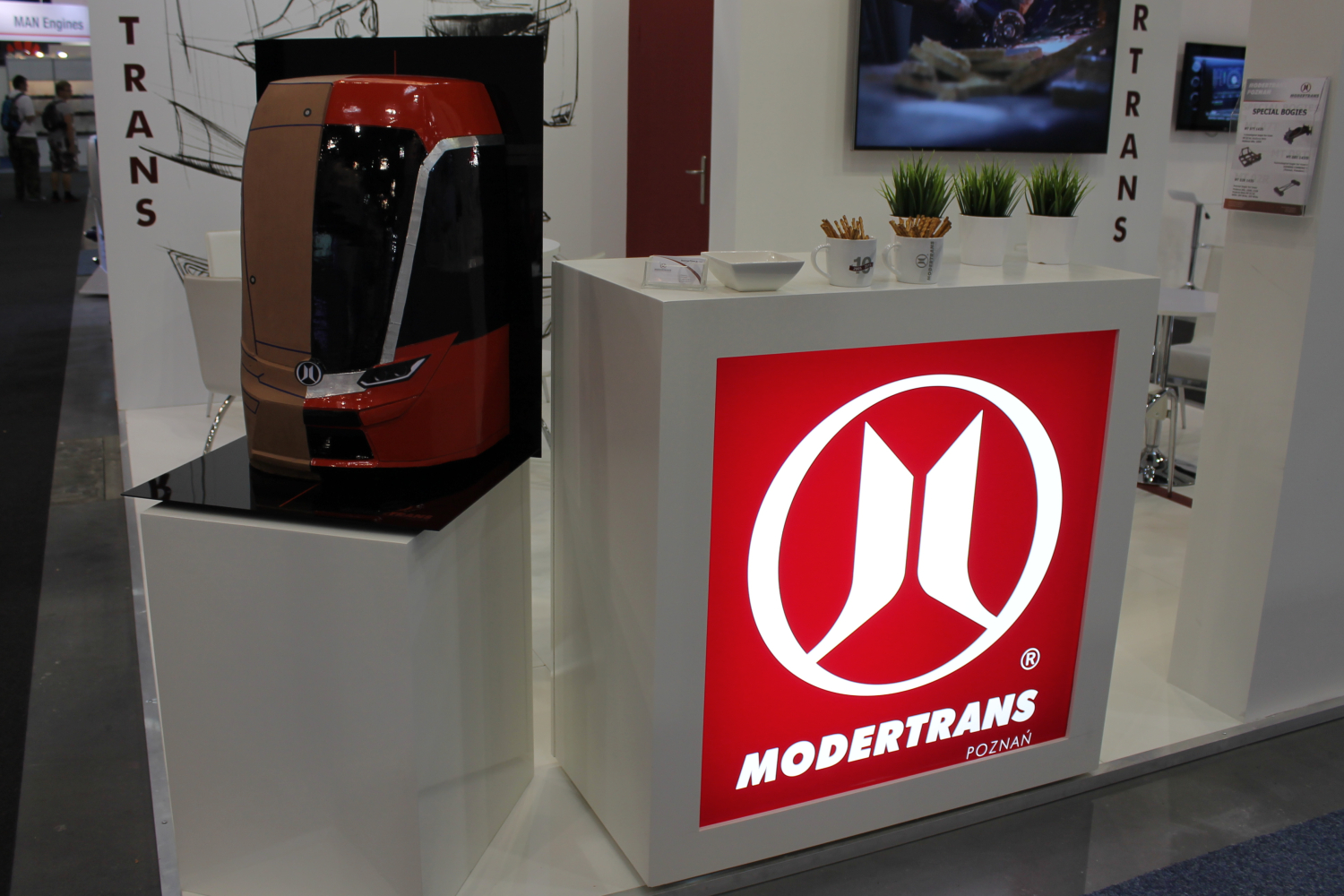
Modertrans' booth at the Trako 2015 fair

In 1988, the Bus Repair Plant was established within MPK Poznań's structure, and in 1998, Bus Repair Plant in Biskupice was founded, which carried out major repairs of buses from Poznań and other cities.

On 31 December 2005, the Bus Repair Plant in Biskupice and the Tram Repair Department of MPK Poznań merged to form Modertrans Poznań. The company's initial share capital was 18,813,000 PLN, divided into shares, which were taken over by the Bus Repair Plant (24.1%) and MPK Poznań (75.9%). On 1 January 2006, 134 employees from MPK and 75 from the Bus Repair Plant were transferred to the new company. The first CEO was Andrzej Bręczewski.

In 2006, the company delivered 2 Moderus Alfa HF 02 DK wagons and 22 Moderus Alfa HF 01 wagons to Poznań's MPK.

In March 2007, the company implemented a new logo, and in July 2007, it obtained an operating permit for the MT-01H bogie. From July to August 2007, a training tram Moderus Alfa HF 03L was delivered to MPK Poznań. At the beginning of October 2007, Poznań's carrier received two historical 105N-194+193 wagons, which were restored to their original appearance and equipment, and the manufacturer won the main Ernest Malinowski Award for the most interesting product and technical innovation in railways at the Trako Fair. From November to December 2007, 16 MT-01H bogies were delivered for Protram 205 WrAs trams operated by MPK Wrocław. In December 2007, the delivery of Moderus Alfa trams for Tramwaje Śląskie began.

In early 2008, the company entered the final production phase of 4 Moderus Alfa HF 04 AC trams for MPK Poznań, which started to be delivered to the carrier in August of that year. In August 2008, the construction of a warehouse in the Biskupice branch began, and in September 2008, Poznań's MPK received the first Alfa HF 07 models. From 23 to 26 September 2008, the company's first presentation at the InnoTrans fair in Berlin took place.

In April 2009, the construction of a new production hall and the expansion and modernization of the office-logistics building in the Biskupice branch began. At the end of this month, the first Moderus Beta MF 01 tram of type N8C was delivered to ZKM Gdańsk, and the first switch on the technological tracks in the Biskupice branch was commissioned. In October 2009, Modertrans participated in the Trako Fair for the second time.

In May 2010, the factory delivered its 100th tram, a Moderus Beta MF 01 for Gdańsk. On 1 May 2010, the Poznań Zoo started operating 3 Moderino trains produced by Modertrans.

In 2012, the company presented its booth at the premier edition of the Local and Regional Public Transport Station Fair, and in 2013 it participated in the Trako Fair for the third time.

In mid-November 2013, the company completed the delivery of Moderus Alfa HF 11 AC wagons for Tramwaje Śląskie ahead of schedule, and in early January 2014, the operation of two of the three ordered MF 13 trams began in Elbląg.

On 11 March 2014 and 4 September 2014, Tramwaje Szczecińskie ordered one Moderus Beta wagon for self-assembly, which were delivered in 2014. The second tram was completed on 23 October 2014, and was the 200th vehicle produced by Modertrans.

At the beginning of November 2014, Modertrans presented the project assumptions for a new low-floor tram developed jointly with Poznań University of Technology. It was assumed that the vehicle would be completed by 2016, with nearly half of the construction funded by the National Centre for Research and Development. On 18 November 2016, the Gamma model was presented.

In June 2017, Modertrans signed its first contract for the delivery of single-section partially low-floor trams. Three such vehicles were ordered by Elbląg.

On 16 November 2020, Andrzej Bręczewski, the founder and CEO of the company, died.

In April 2021, Modertrans won a tender for the post-accident repair of EZT EN76-035 for Greater Poland Railways, thus entering the railway vehicle repair market. On 29 May 2021, Modertrans presented a new prototype single-section, fully low-floor tram – Moderus Gamma LF 05 AC, the first fully low-floor single-section tram produced in Poland. In December 2021, MPK Poznań announced a tender for consulting on the sale of shares in Modertrans.

== Operation ==
=== Summary of manufactured, upgraded or refurbished vehicles ===
Vehicle	Number of units	Production years	Customer	Sources
High-floor trams
Moderus Alfa HF 01	22	2006	MPK Poznań	
Moderus Alfa HF 02 DK	2	2006	MPK Poznań	
Moderus Alfa HF 03 L	2	2007	MPK Poznań	
Moderus Alfa HF 04 AC	4	2008	MPK Poznań	
Moderus Alfa HF 05	2	2007	Tramwaje Śląskie	
Moderus Alfa HF 07	36	2008–2010	MPK Poznań	
Moderus Alfa HF 09	2	2008	Tramwaje Szczecińskie	
Moderus Alfa HF 10 AC	12	2011–2013	Tramwaje Szczecińskie	
Moderus Alfa HF 11 AC	75	2012–2014	Tramwaje Śląskie	
Partially low-floor trams
N8C – MF 01	46	2009–2012	ZKM Gdańsk	
Moderus Beta MF 02 AC	24	2011–2015	MPK Poznań	
RT6 – MF 06 AC	16	2011–2021	MPK Poznań	
Moderus Beta MF 09 AC	5	from 2017	Tramwaje Elbląskie	
114Na – MF 12	2	2012–2017	ZKM Gdańsk	
M8C – MF 13	2	2013	Tramwaje Elbląskie	
M8C – MF 14 AC BD	1	2015	Tramwaje Elbląskie	
Moderus Beta MF 15 AC	2	2014	Tramwaje Szczecińskie	
Moderus Beta MF 16 AC BD	12	2015	Tramwaje Śląskie	
N8C – MF 18	16	2015	ZKM Gdańsk	
Moderus Beta MF 19 AC	22	2015–2017	MPK Wrocław	
Moderus Beta MF 20 AC	20	2016–2017	MPK Poznań	
Moderus Beta MF 22 AC BD	10	2016–2017	MPK Poznań	
Moderus Beta MF 24 AC	40	2017–2019	MPK Wrocław	
Moderus Beta MF 29 AC BD	6	2020–2023	Tramwaje Szczecińskie	
Moderus Beta MF 10 AC	13	2018–2020	Tramwaje Śląskie	
Moderus Beta MF 11 AC BD	2	2018–2020	Tramwaje Śląskie	
Low-floor trams
Moderus Gamma LF 01 AC	1	2016	prototype	
Moderus Gamma LF 02 AC	30	2017–2019	MPK Poznań	
Moderus Gamma LF 03 AC BD	20	2017–2019	MPK Poznań	
Moderus Gamma LF 05 AC	1	2021	prototype	
Moderus Gamma LF 06 AC	30	2020–2023	MPK Łódź	
Moderus Gamma LF 07 AC	29 of 46	from 2020	MPK Wrocław	
Moderus Gamma LF 12 AC BD	12	2025-2026	Tramwaje Szczecińskie	
Historic and vintage trams
105N	2	2007	MPK Poznań	
102Na	1	2008	MPK Poznań	
Carl Weyer WD type	1	2013–2015	MPK Poznań	
Bergische Stahlindustrie type I	1	2016–2018	MPK Poznań	
Other vehicles
Moderino	3	2010	Poznań Zoo	

High-floor trams

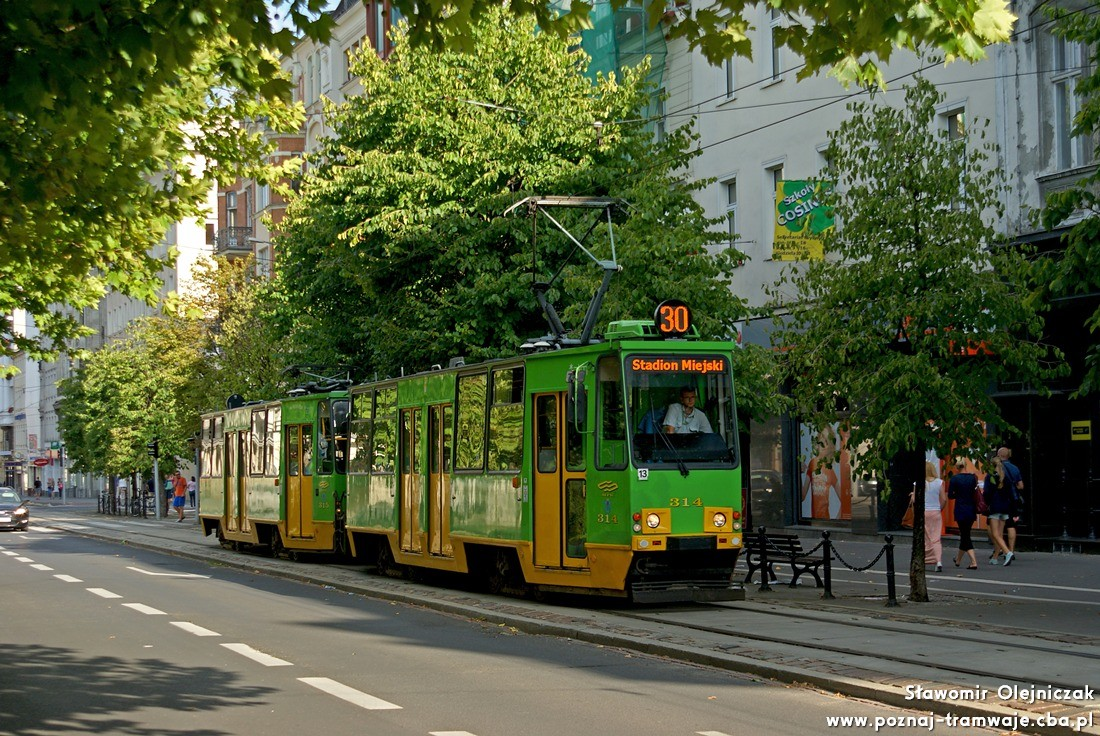
Alfa HF 01 for Poznań

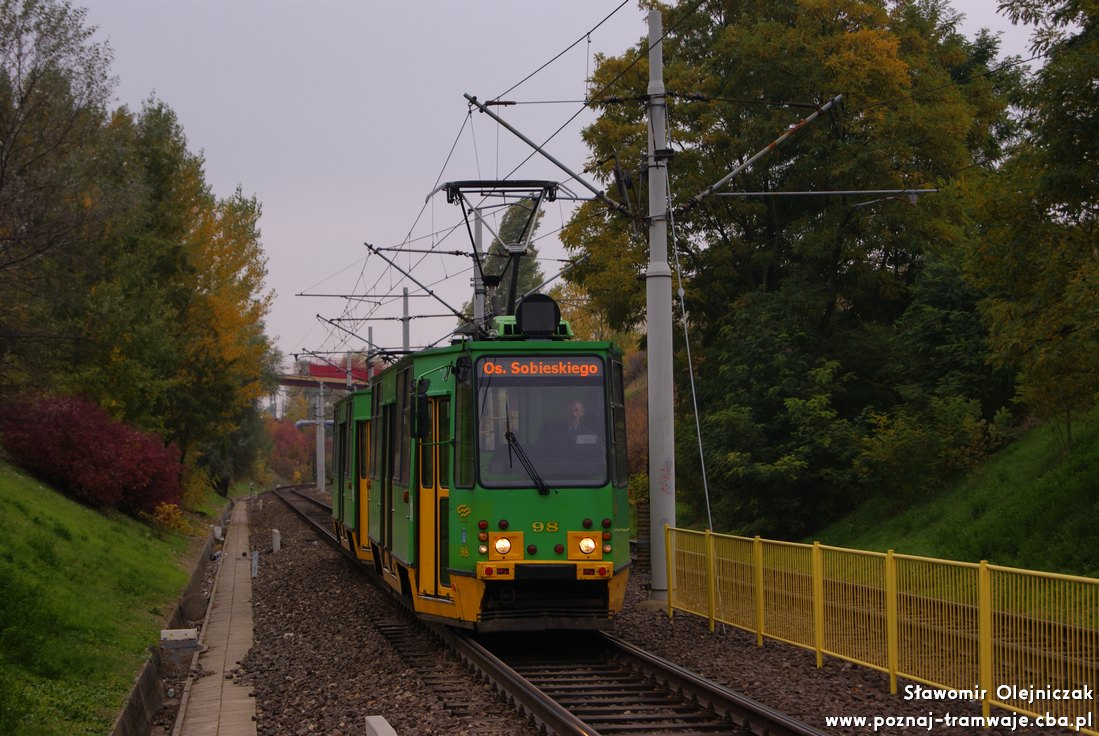
Alfa HF 02 DK for Poznań

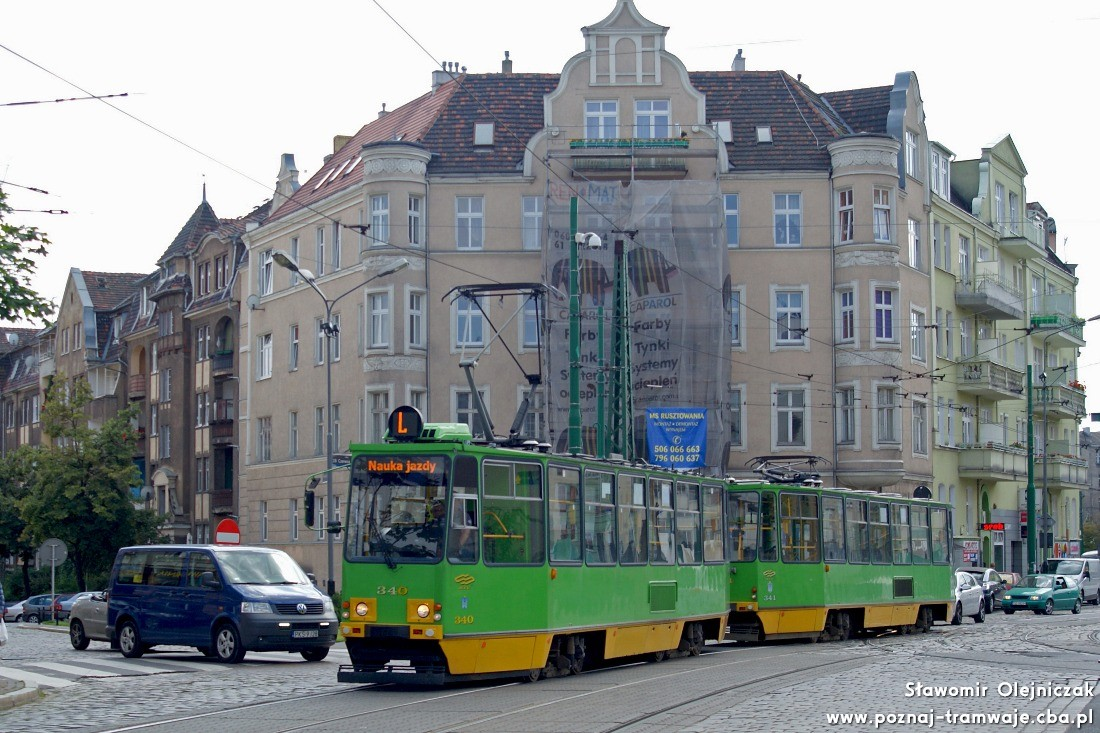
Alfa HF 03 L for Poznań

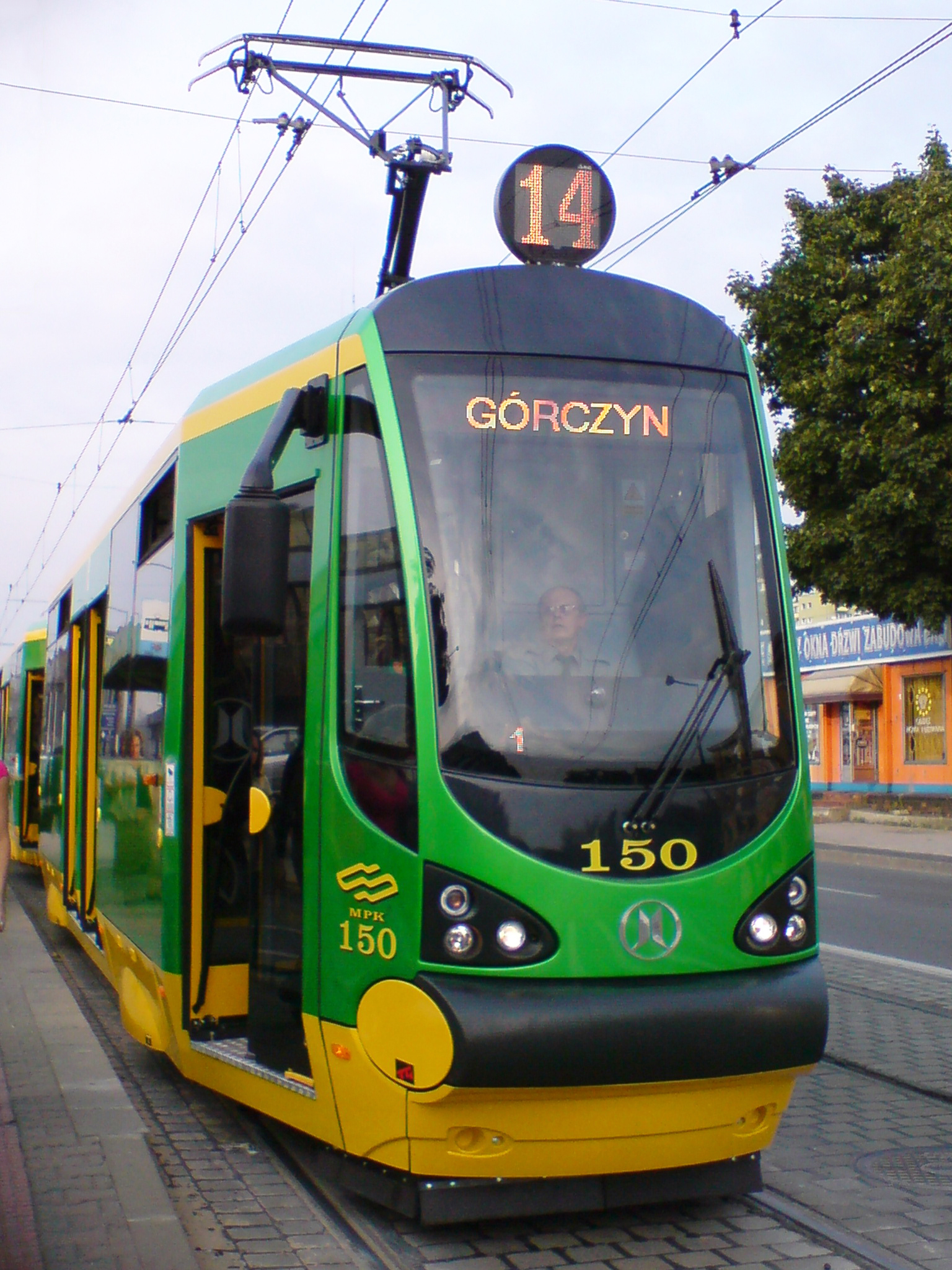
Alfa HF 04 AC for Poznań

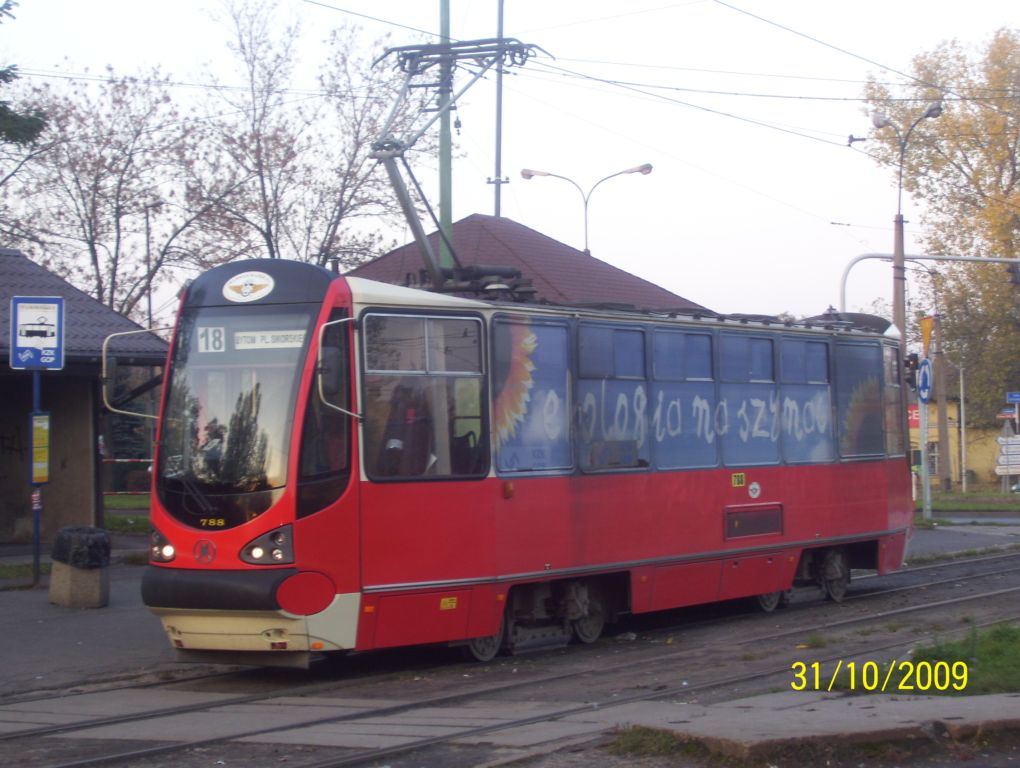
Alfa HF 05 for Silesia

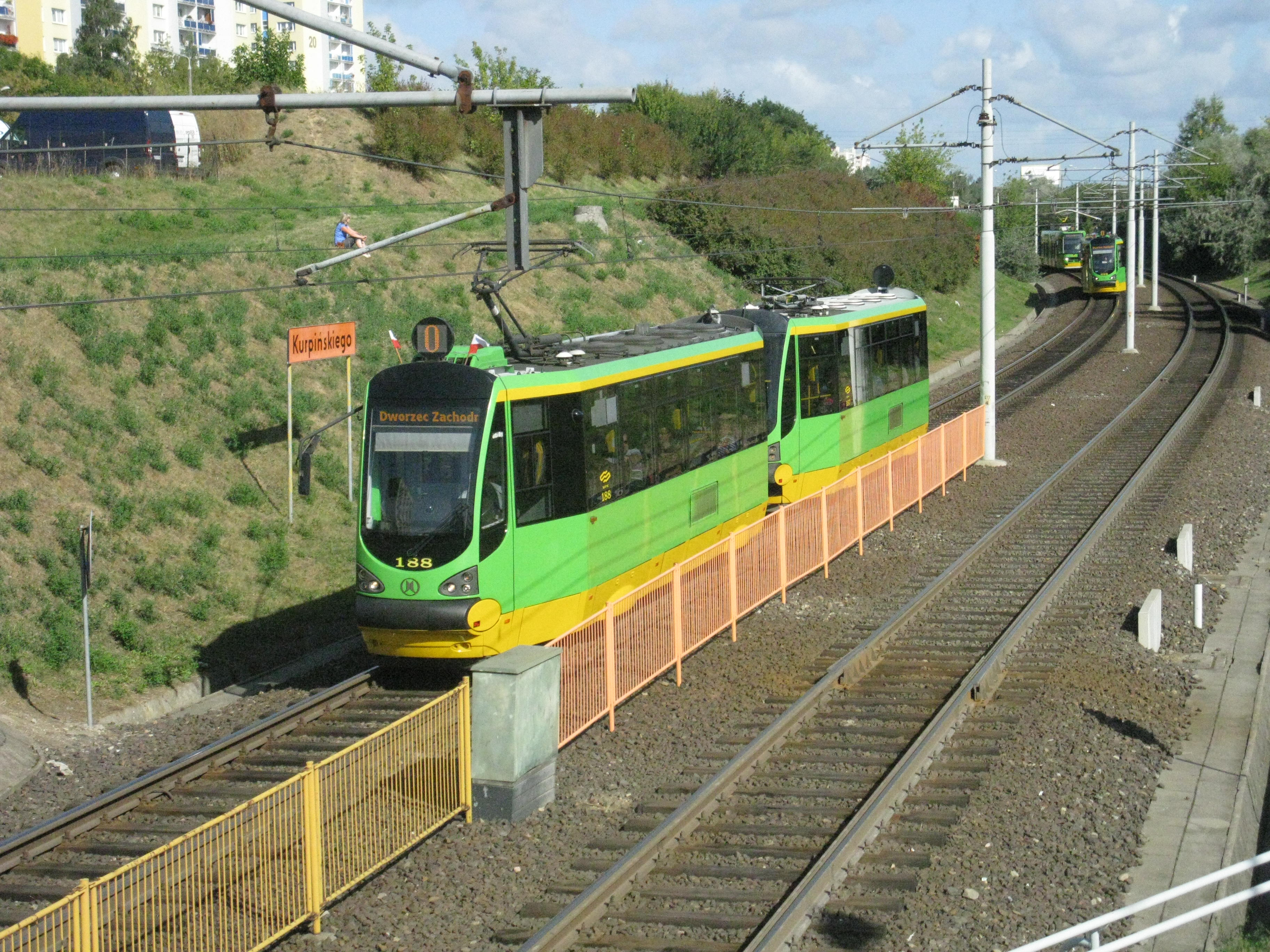
Alfa HF 07 for Poznań

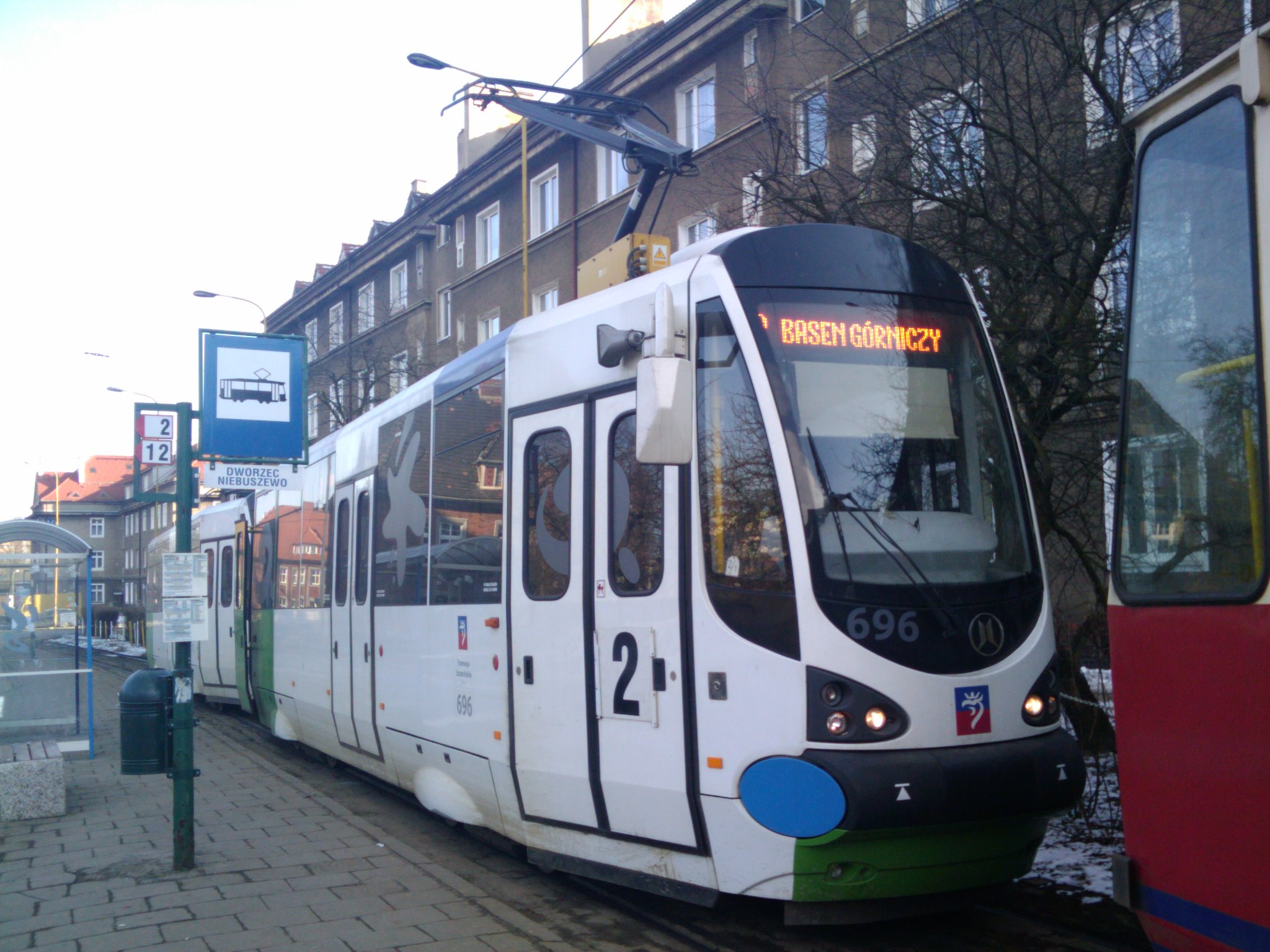
Alfa HF 09 for Szczecin

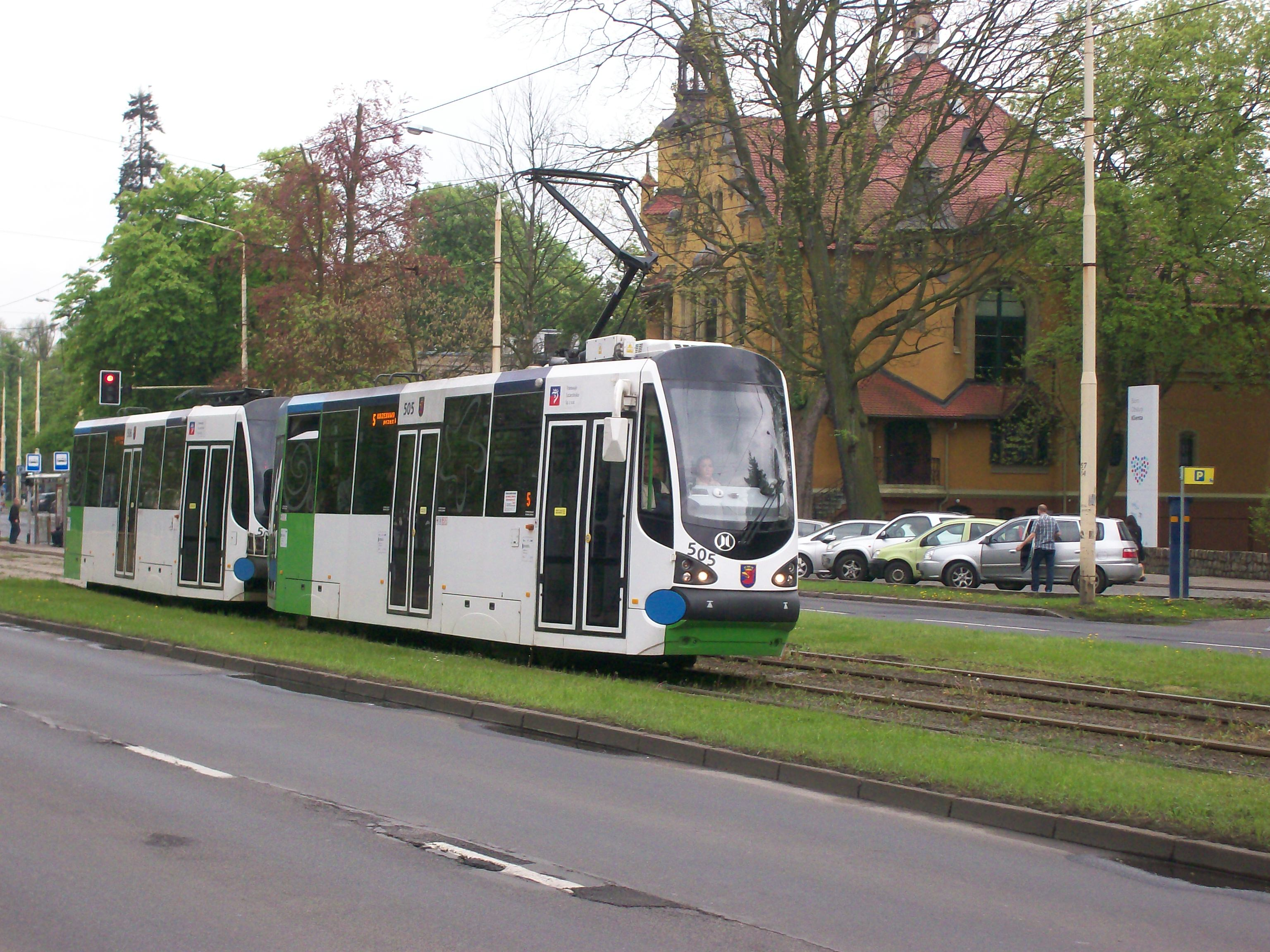
Alfa HF 10 AC for Szczecin

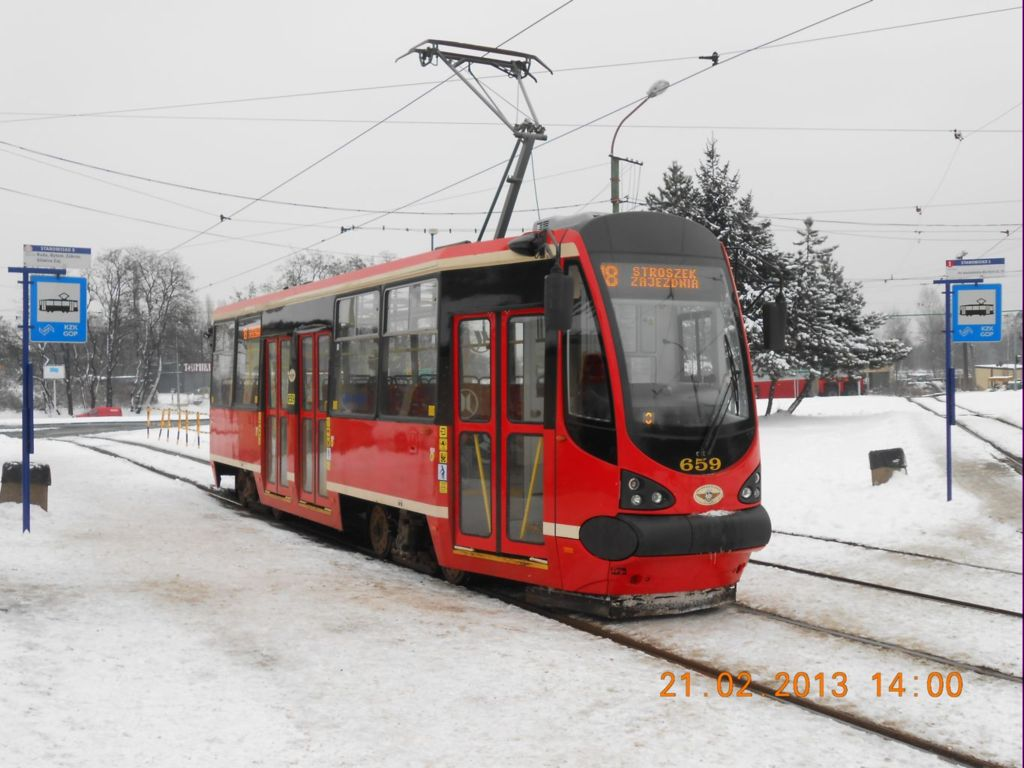
Alfa HF 11 AC for Silesia
Partially low-floor trams

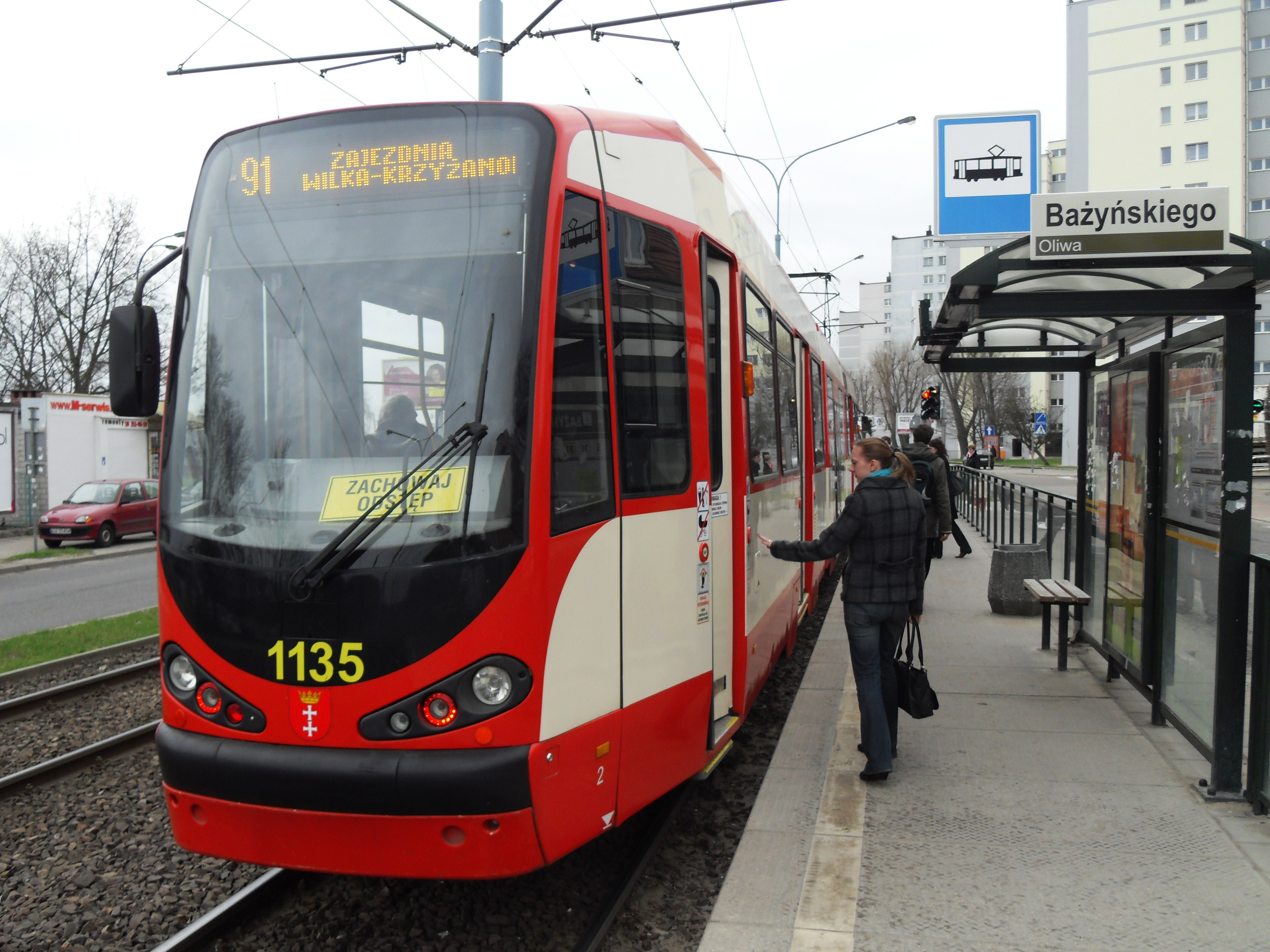
N8C – MF 01 for Gdańsk

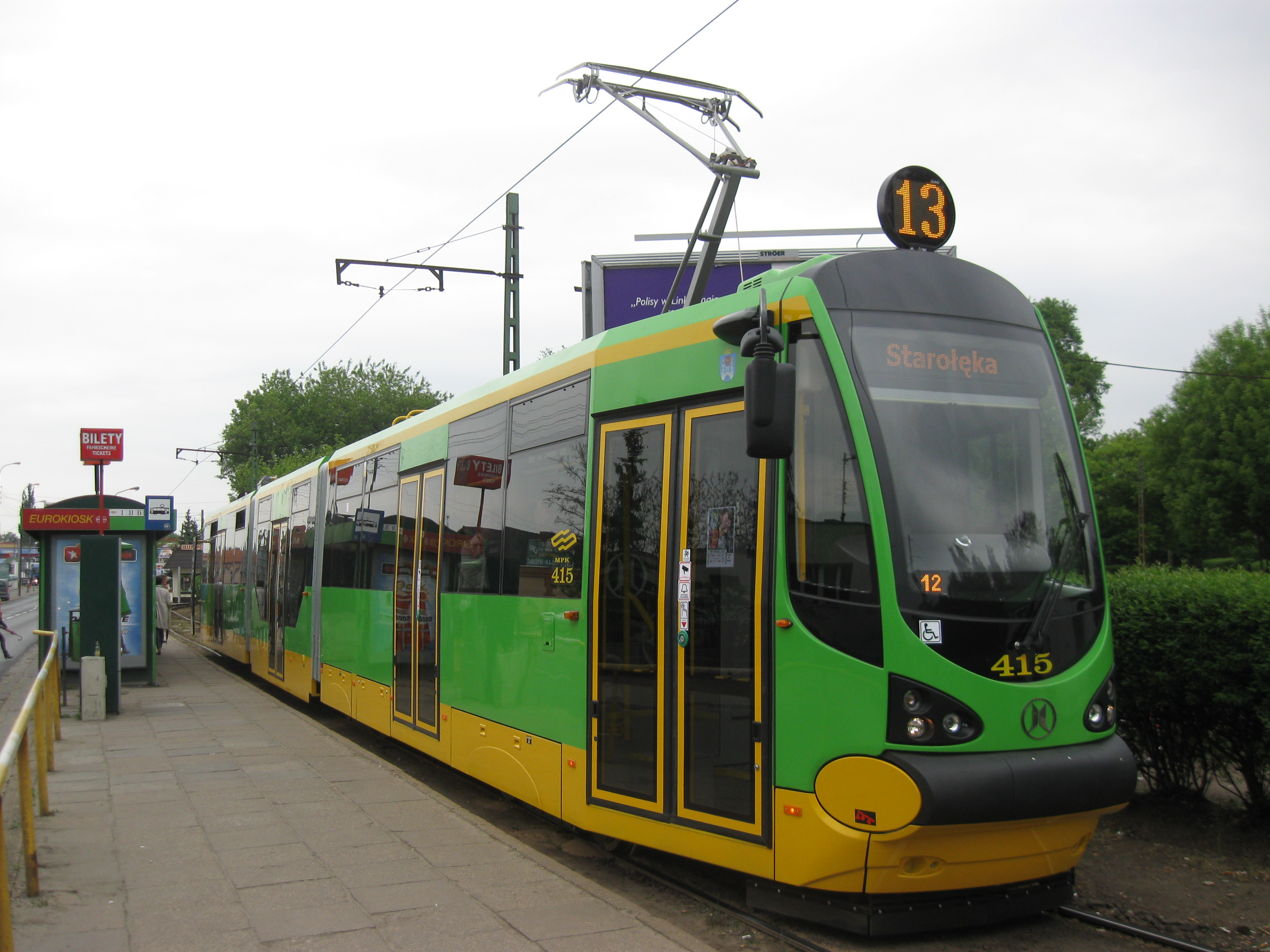
Beta MF 02 AC for Poznań

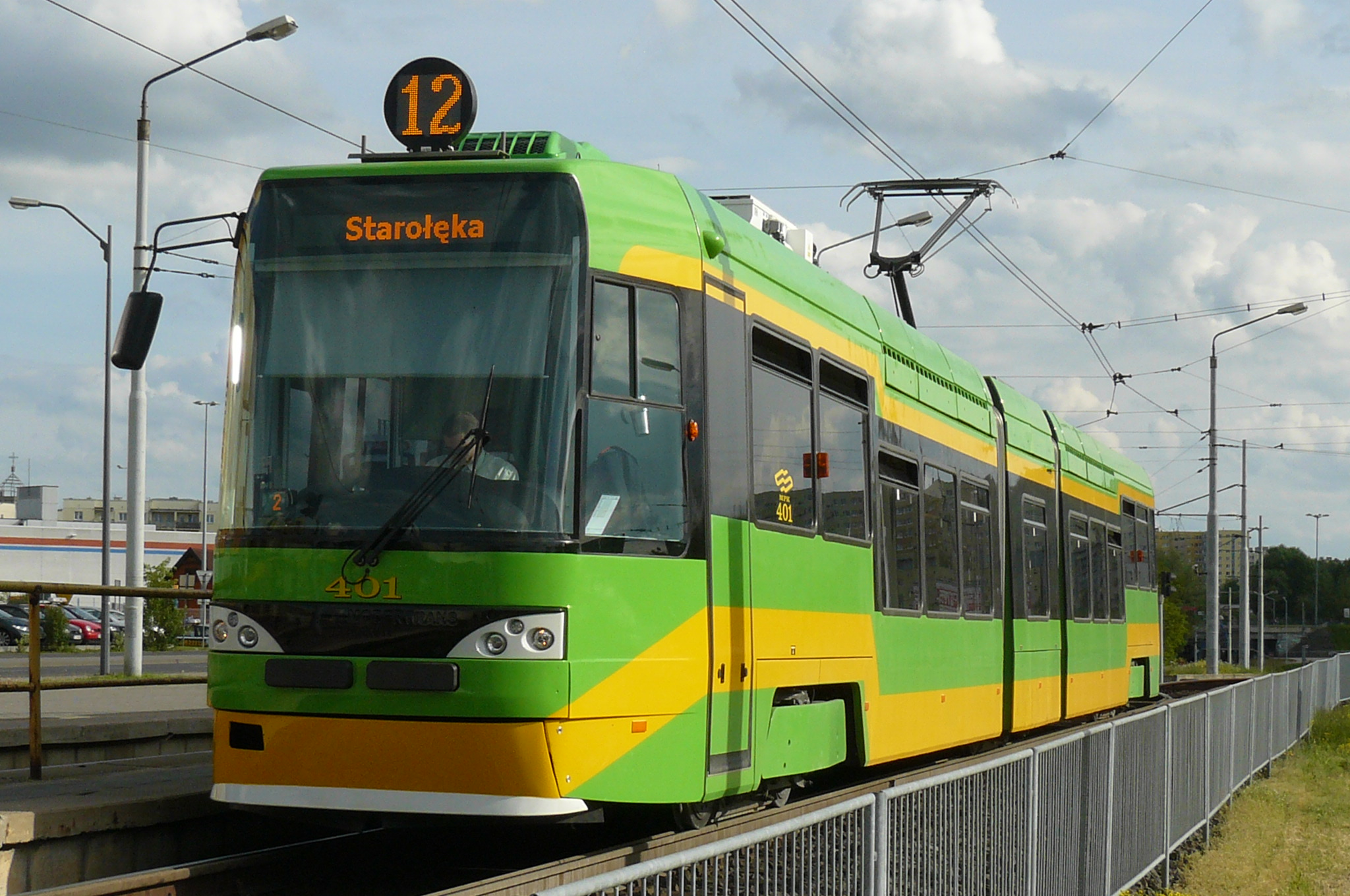
RT6 – MF 06 AC for Poznań

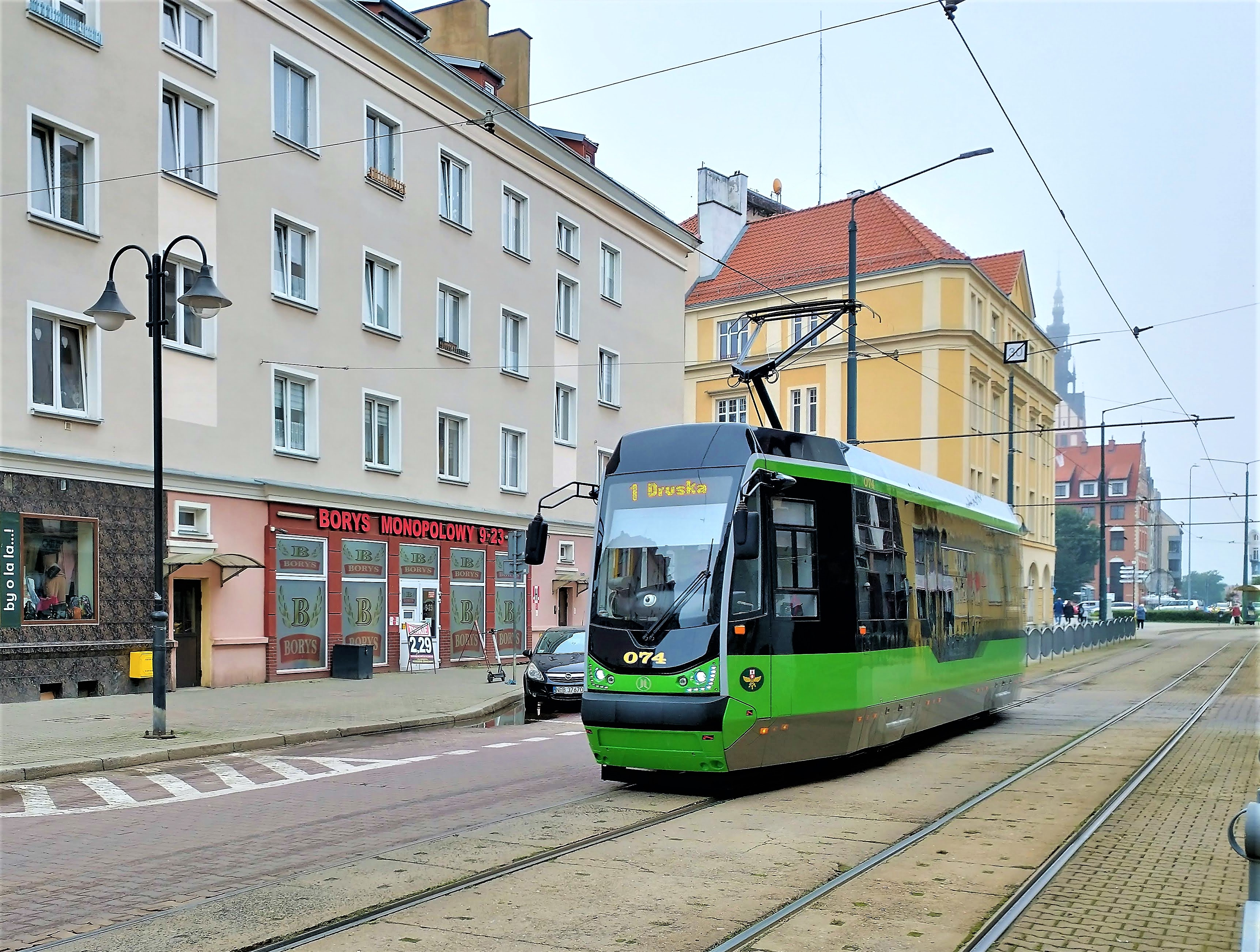
Beta MF 09 AC BD for Elbląg

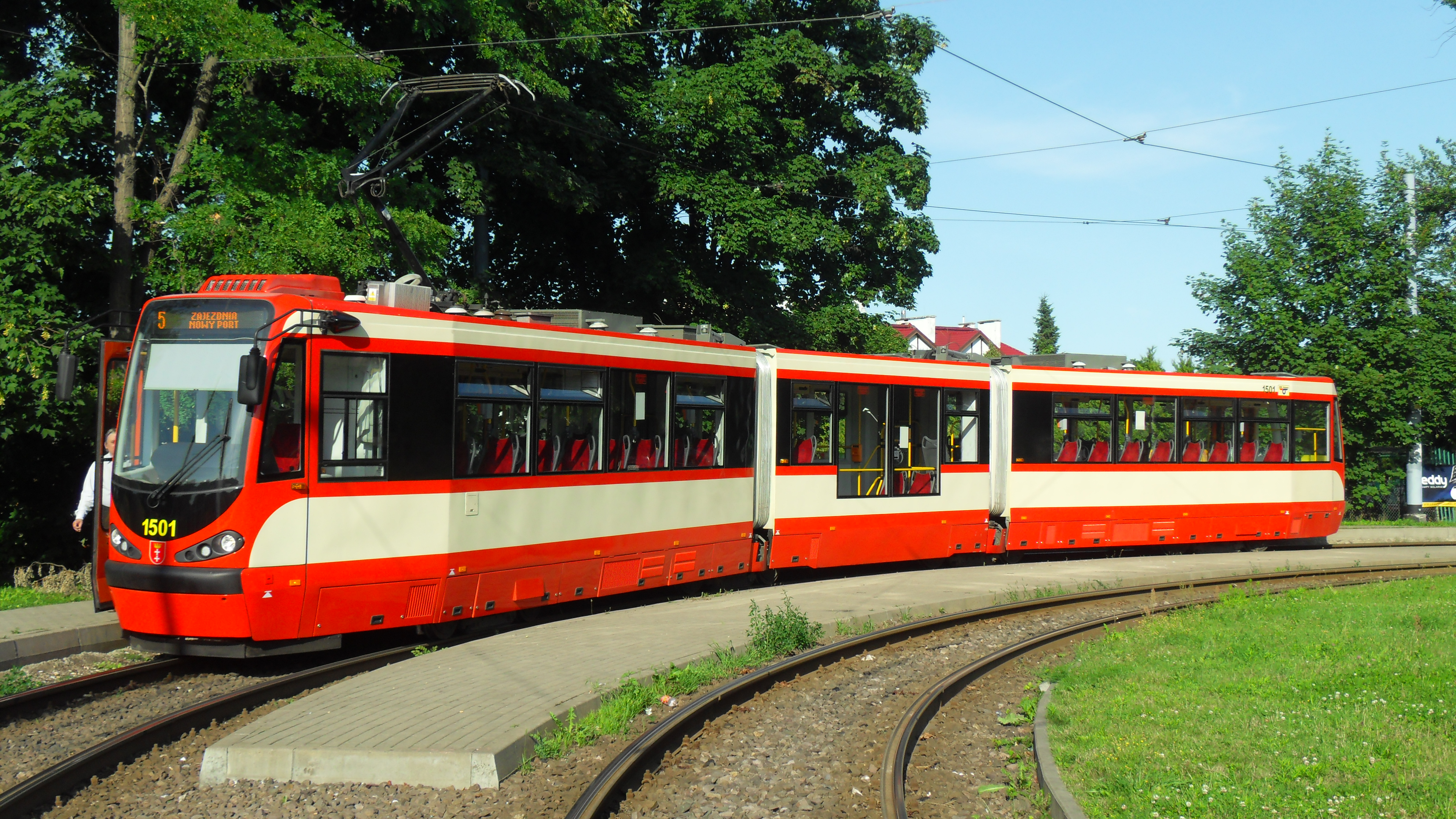
114Na – MF 12 for Gdańsk

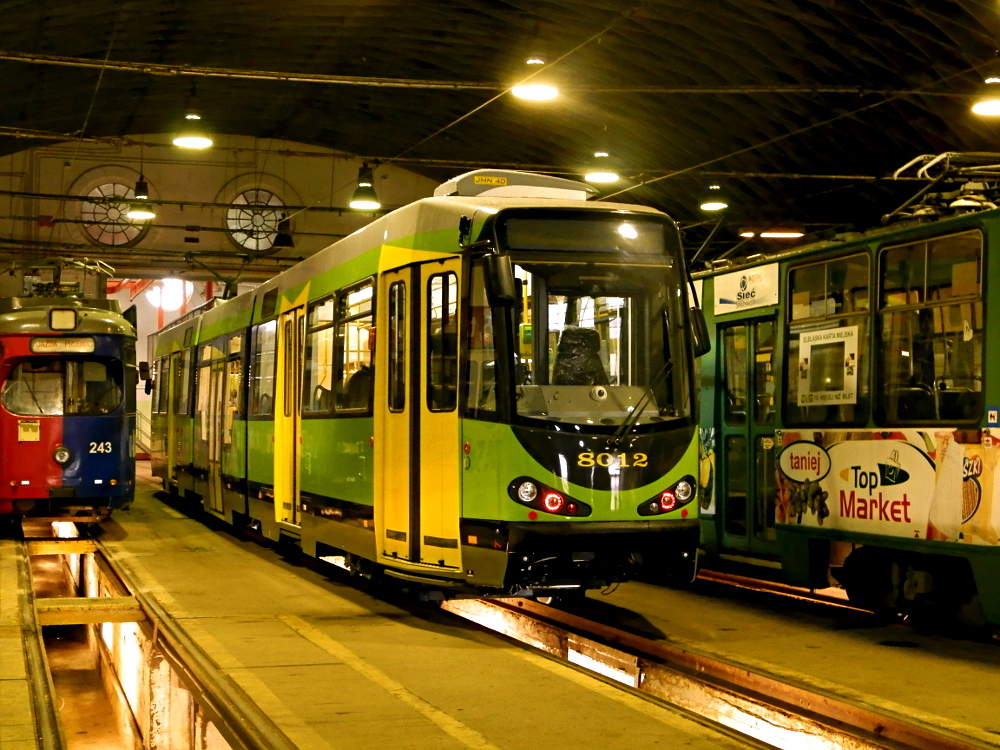
M8C – MF 13 for Elbląg

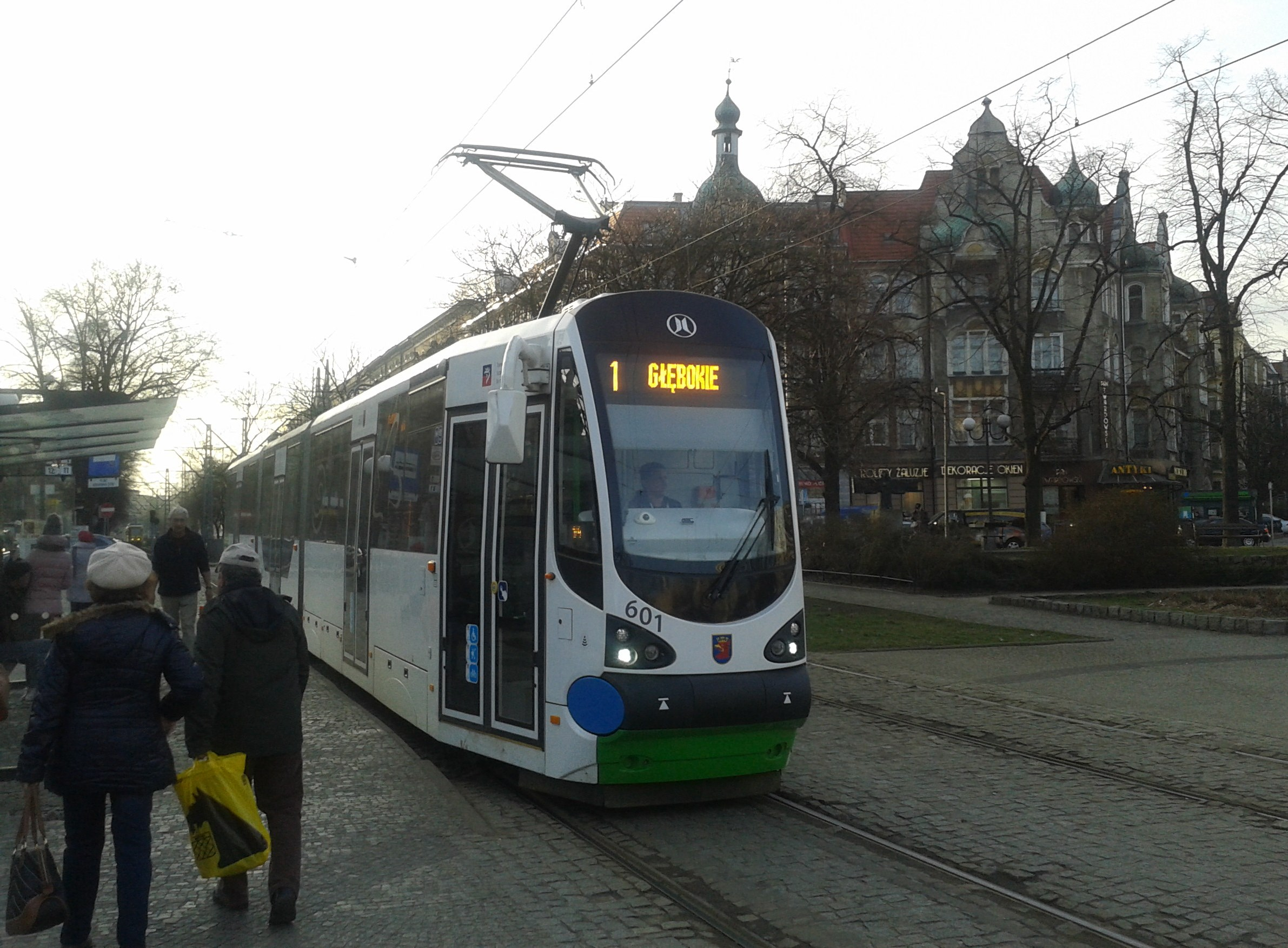
Beta MF 15 AC for Szczecin

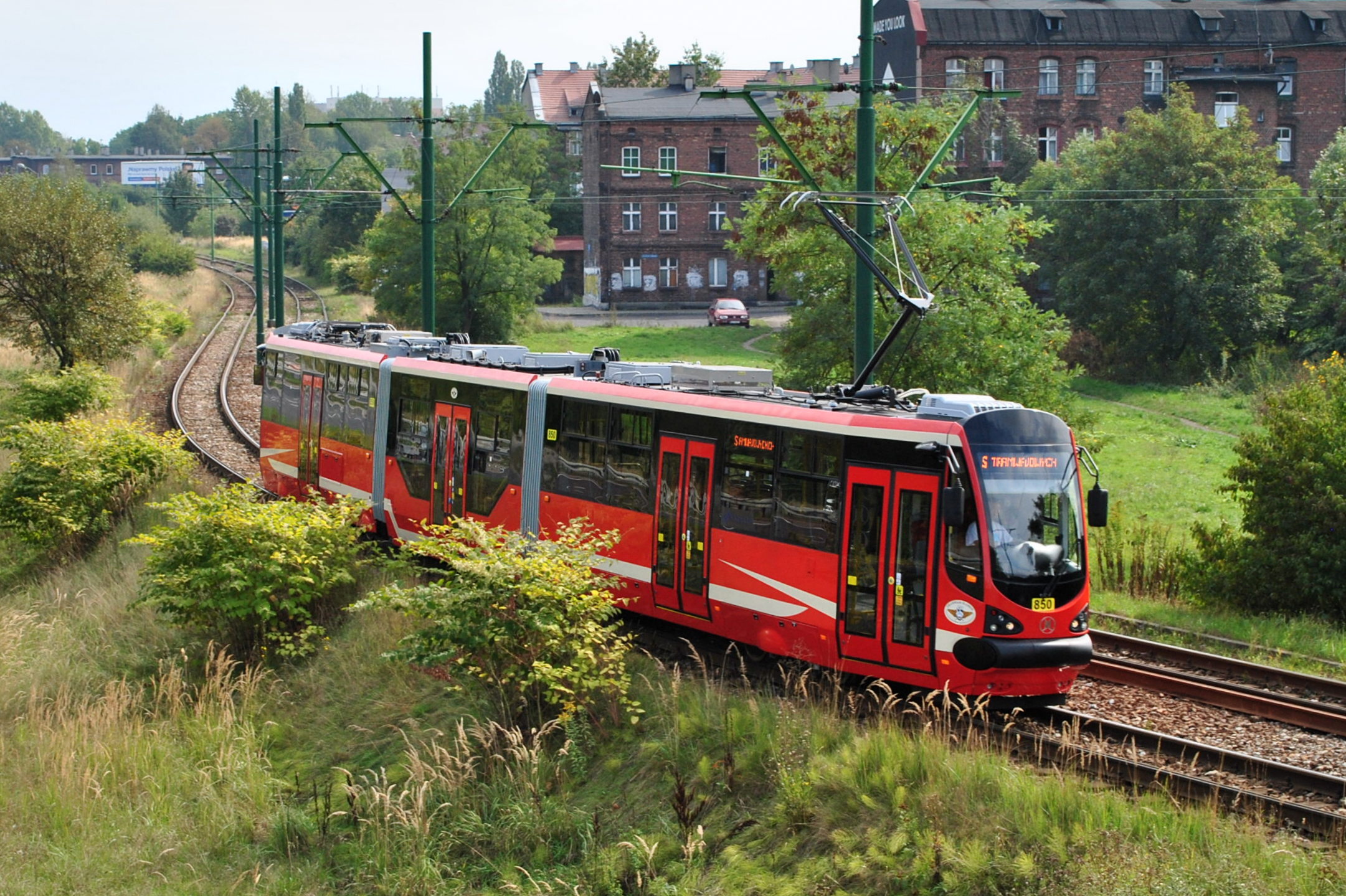
Beta MF 16 AC BD for Silesia

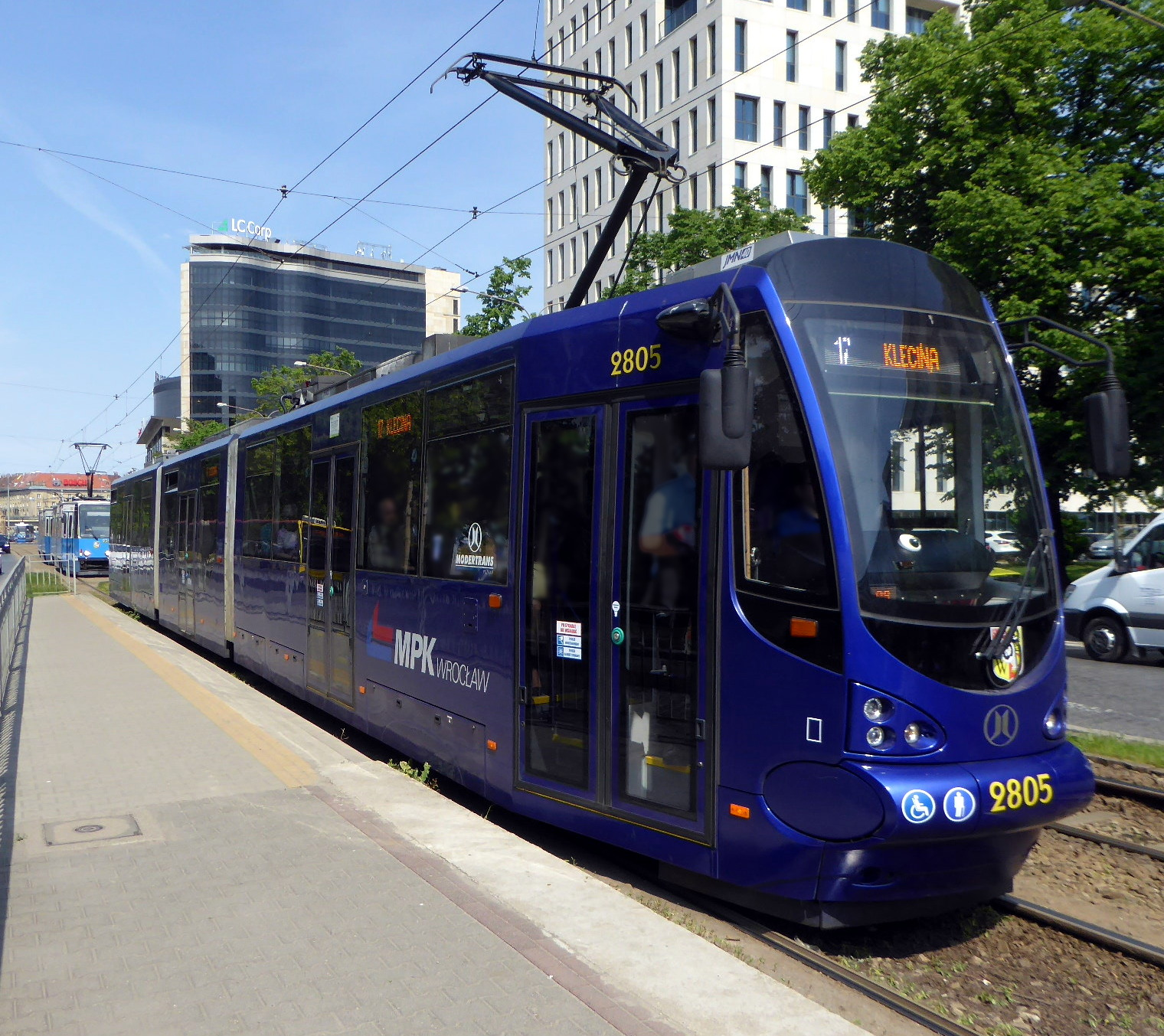
Beta MF 19 AC for Wrocław

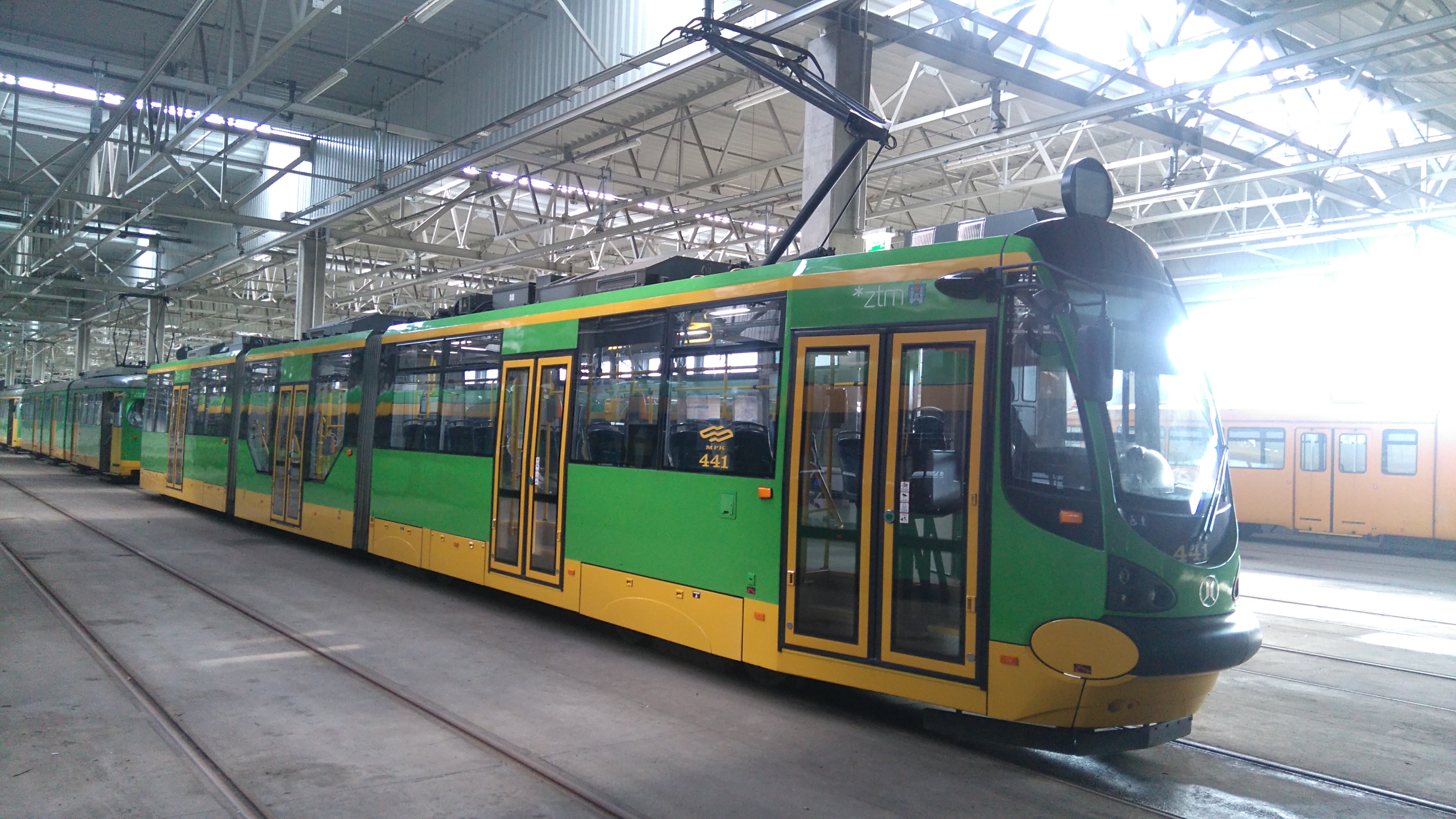
Beta MF 20 AC for Poznań

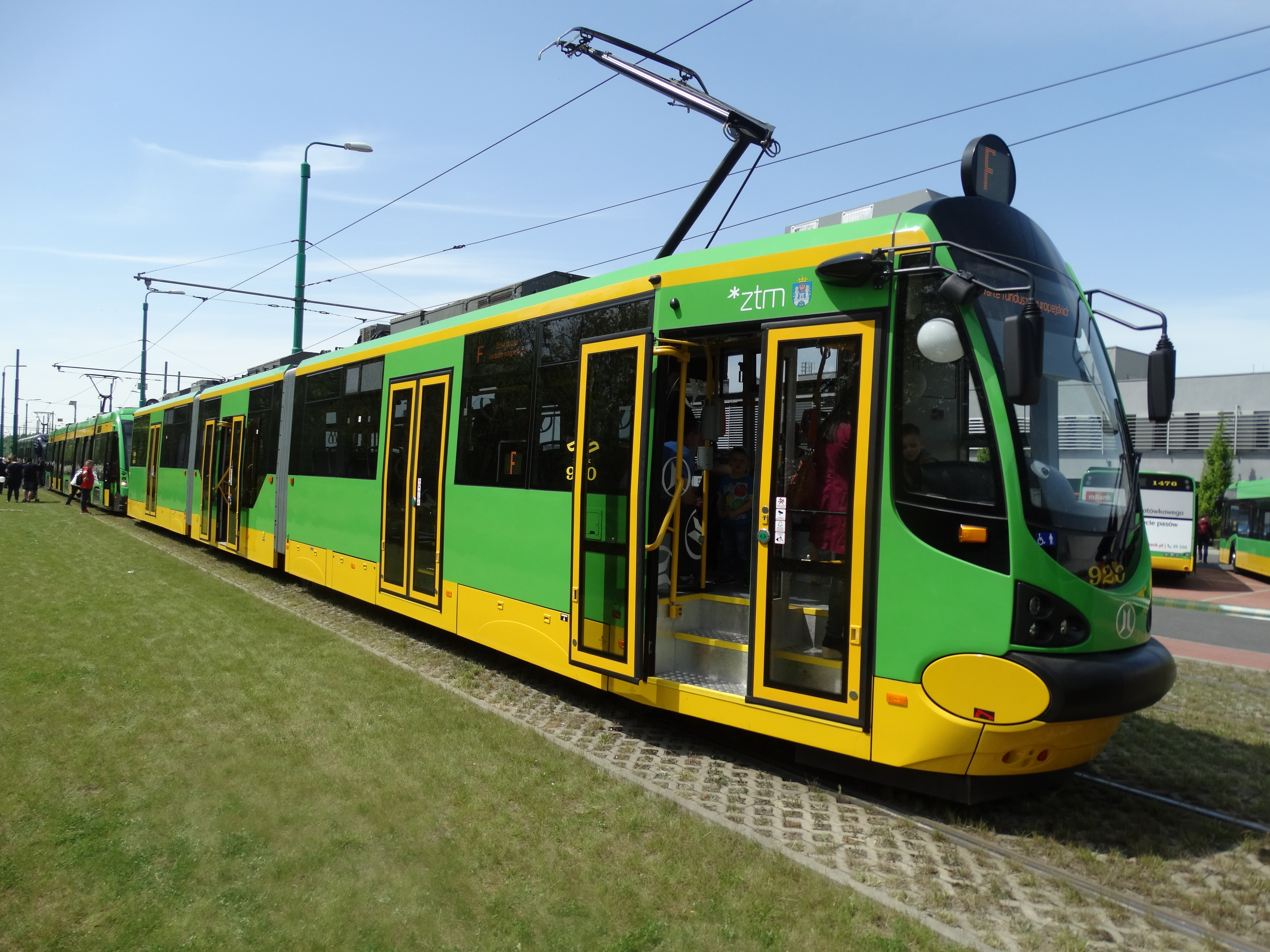
Beta MF 22 AC BD for Poznań

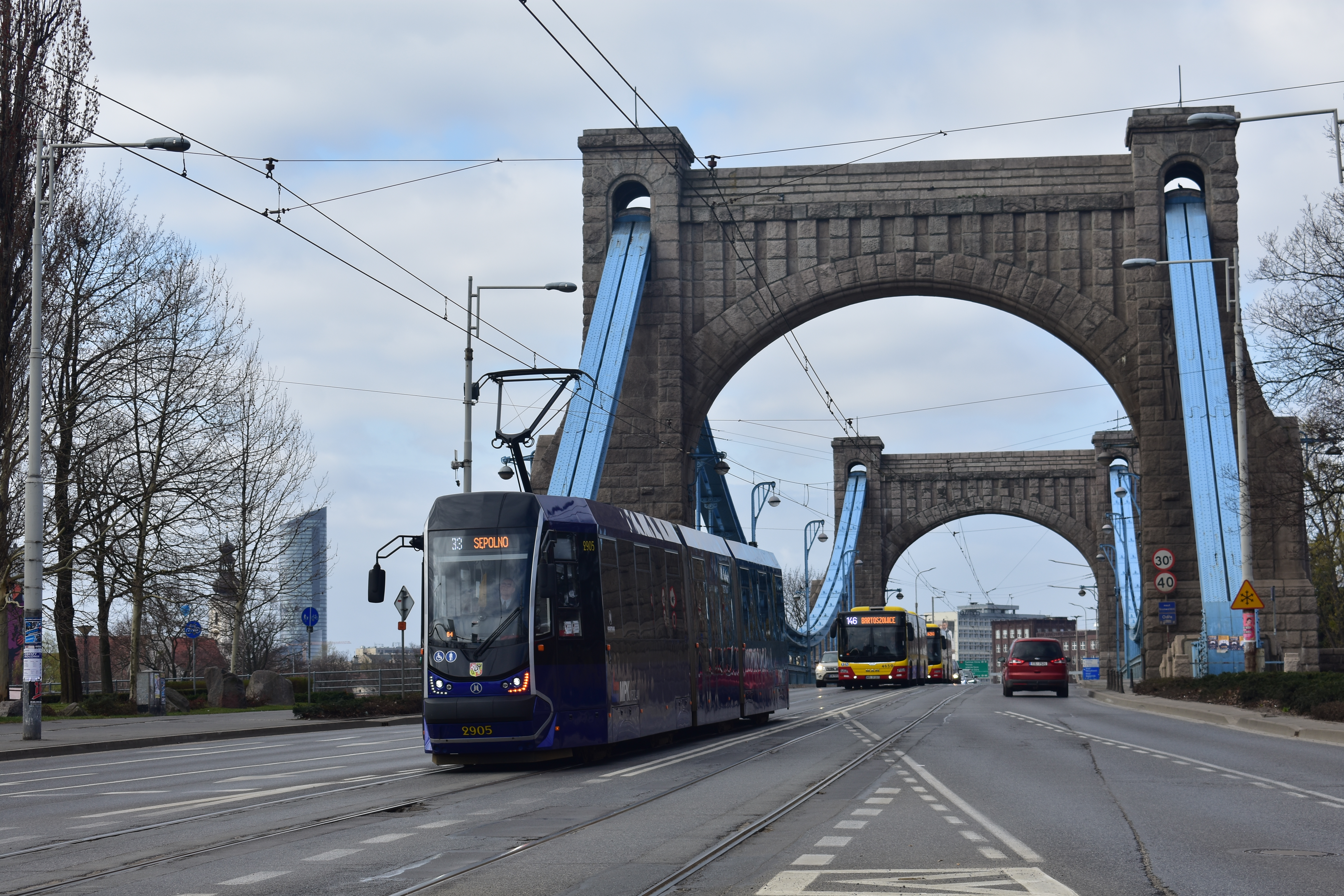
Beta MF 24 AC for Wrocław

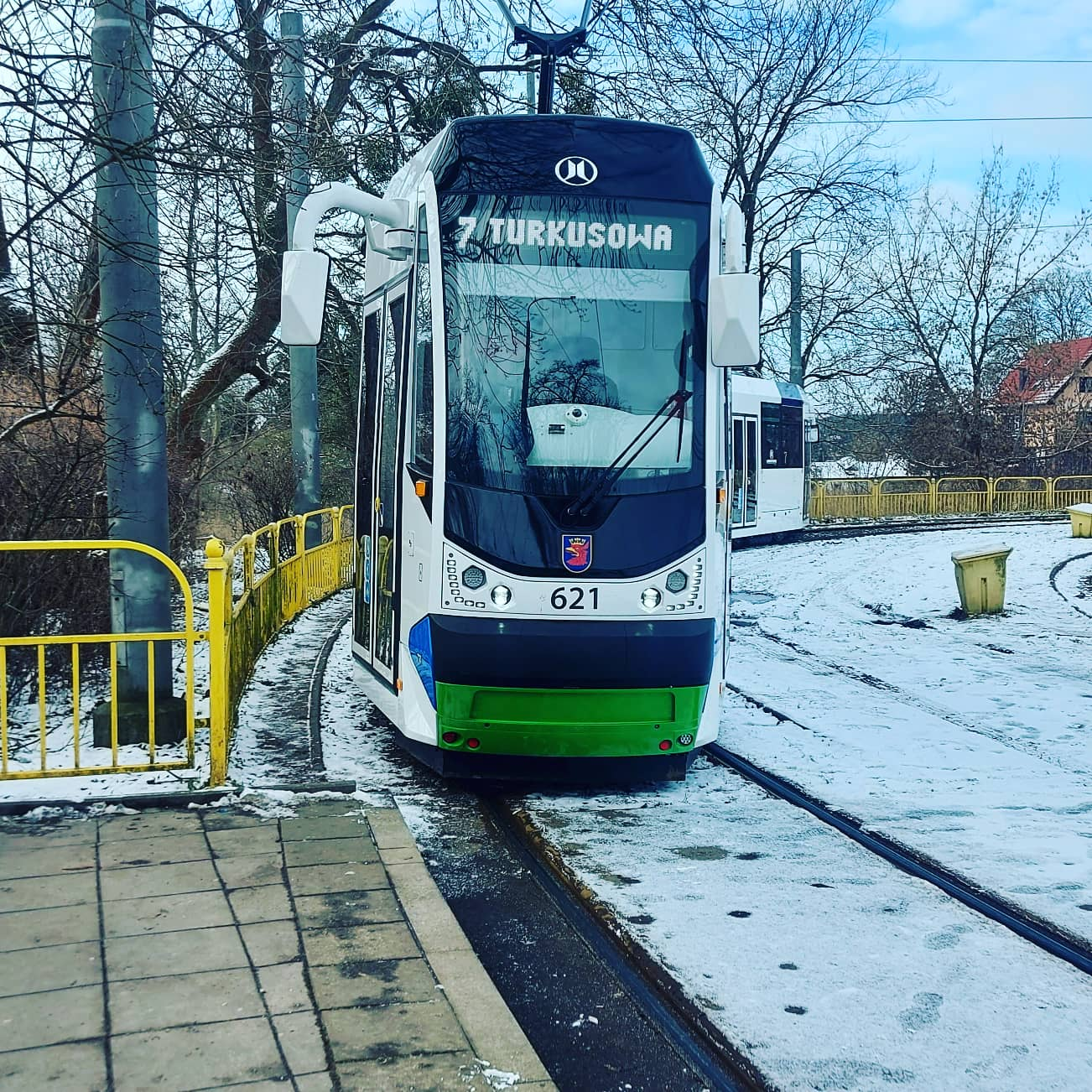
Beta MF 29 AC BD for Szczecin

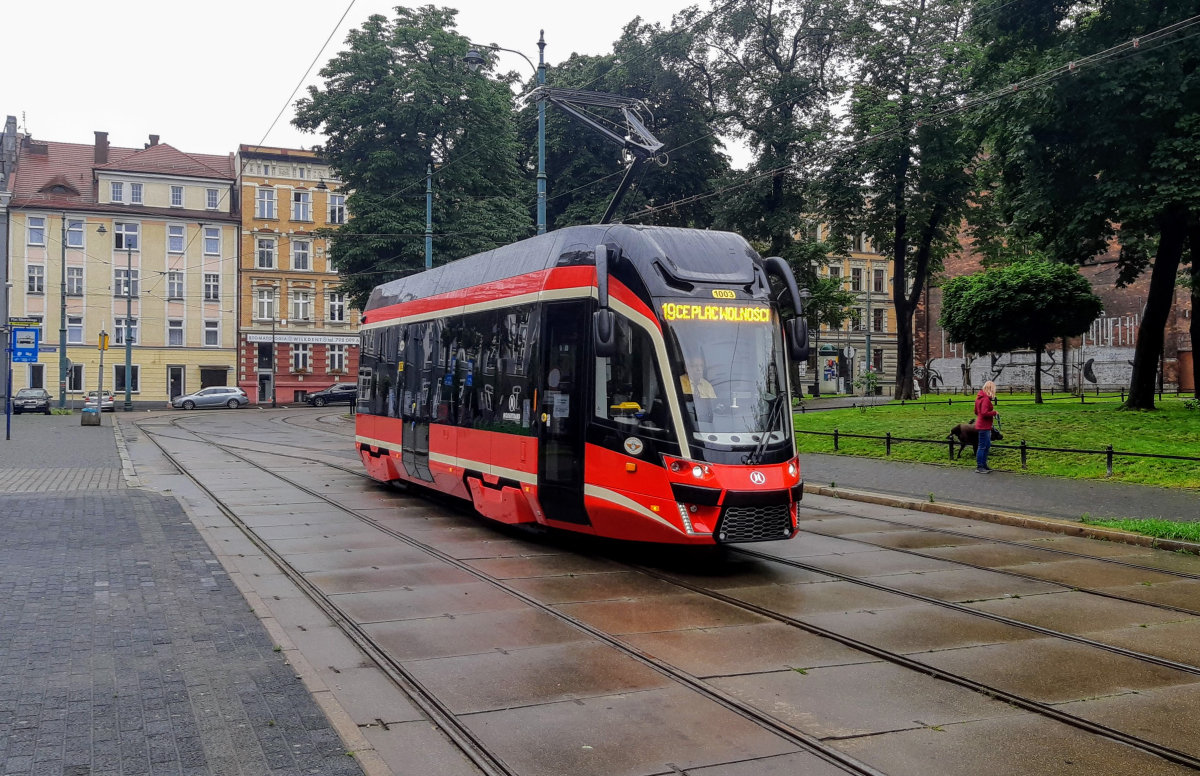
Beta MF 10 AC for Silesia

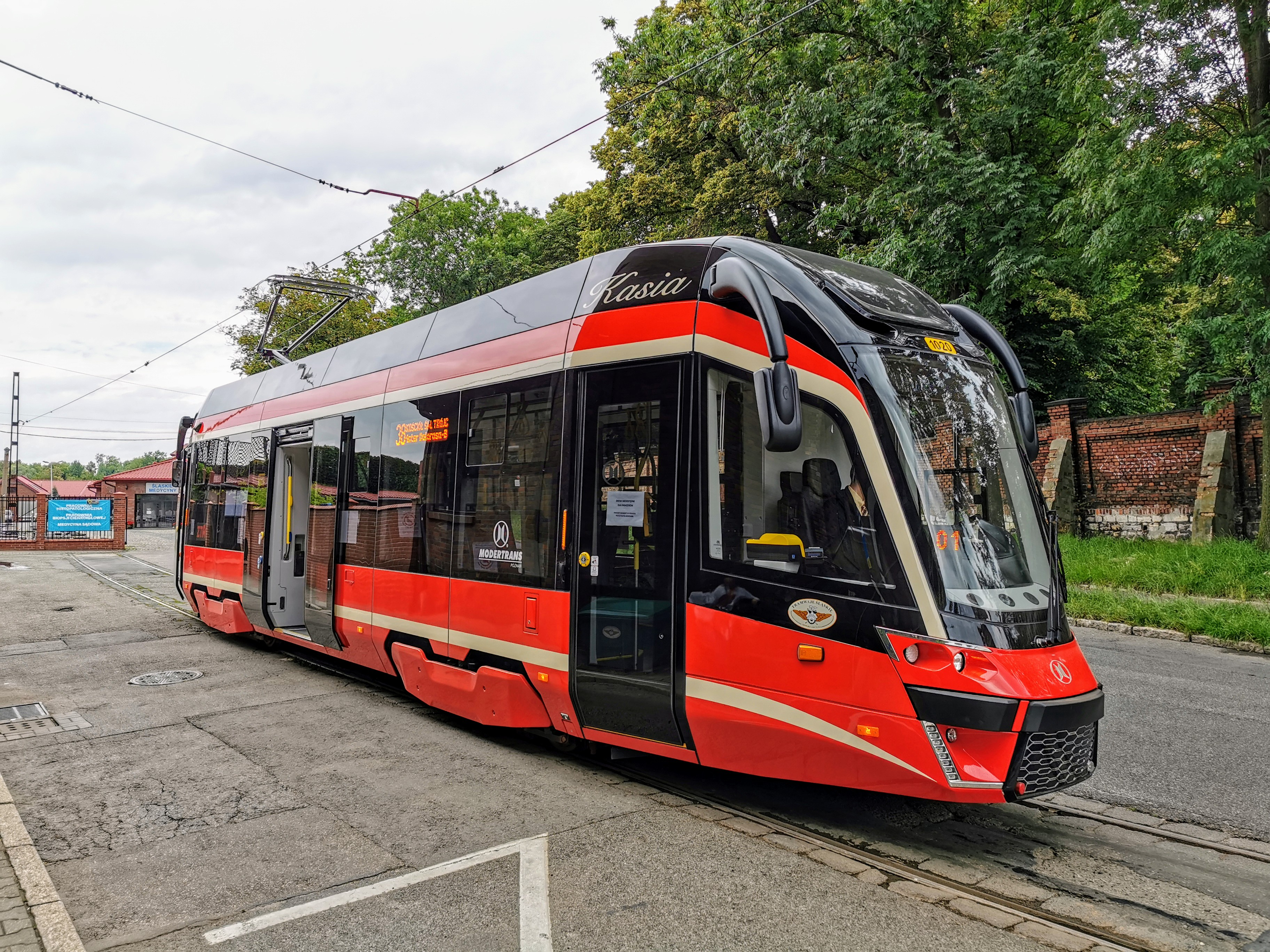
Beta MF 11 AC BD for Silesia

Beta MF30 AC BD for Silesia
Low-floor trams

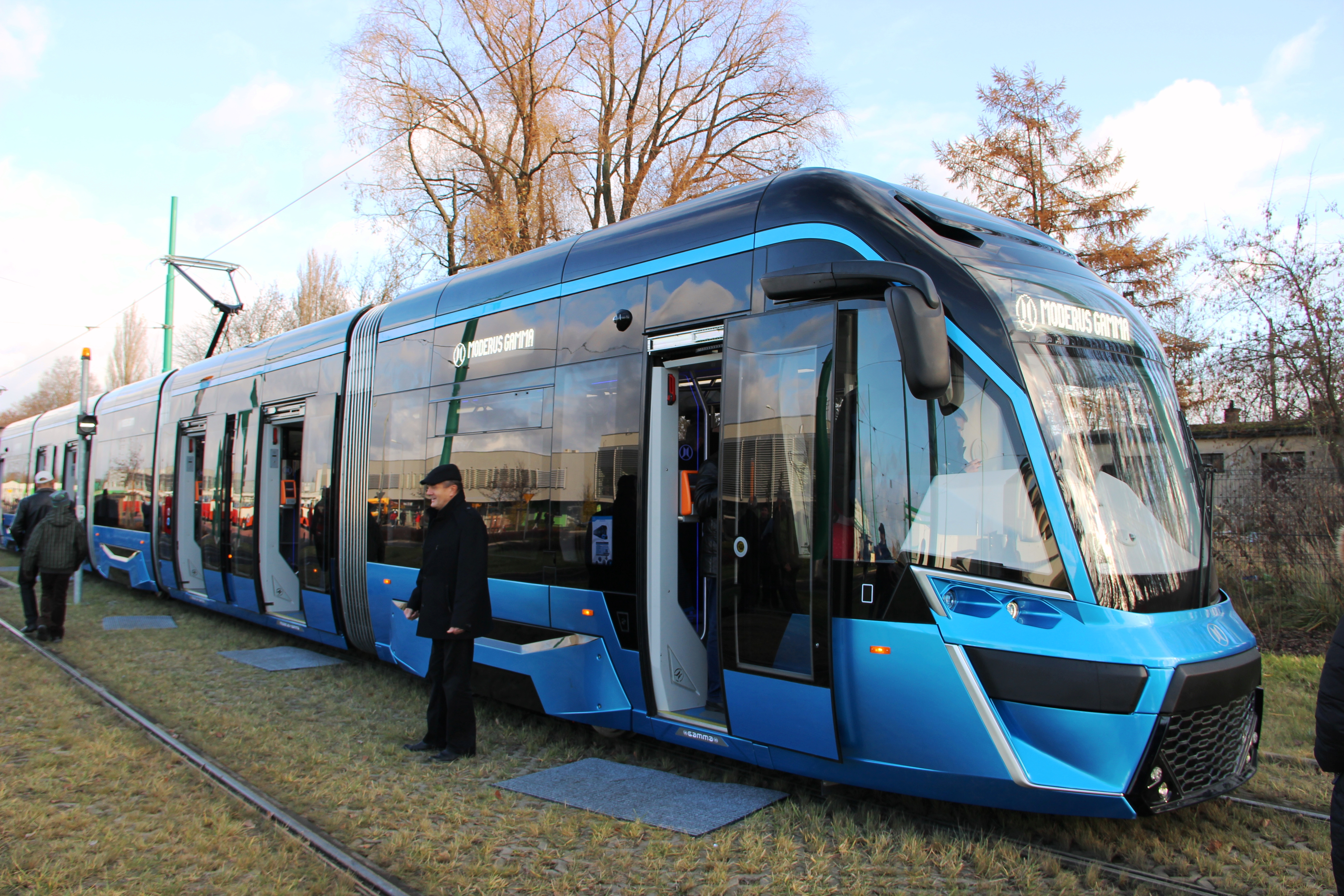
Gamma LF 01 AC

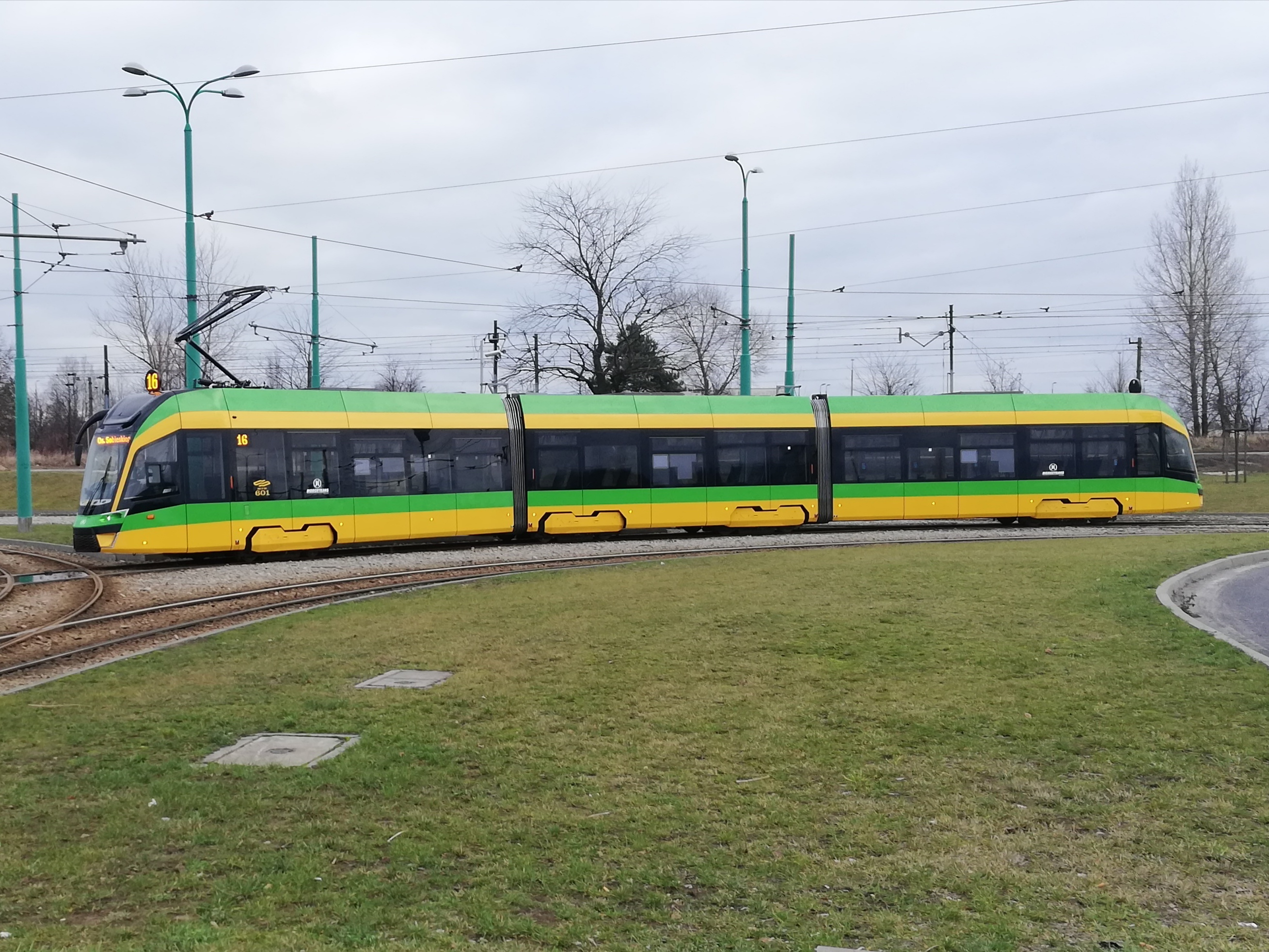
Gamma LF 02 AC for Poznań

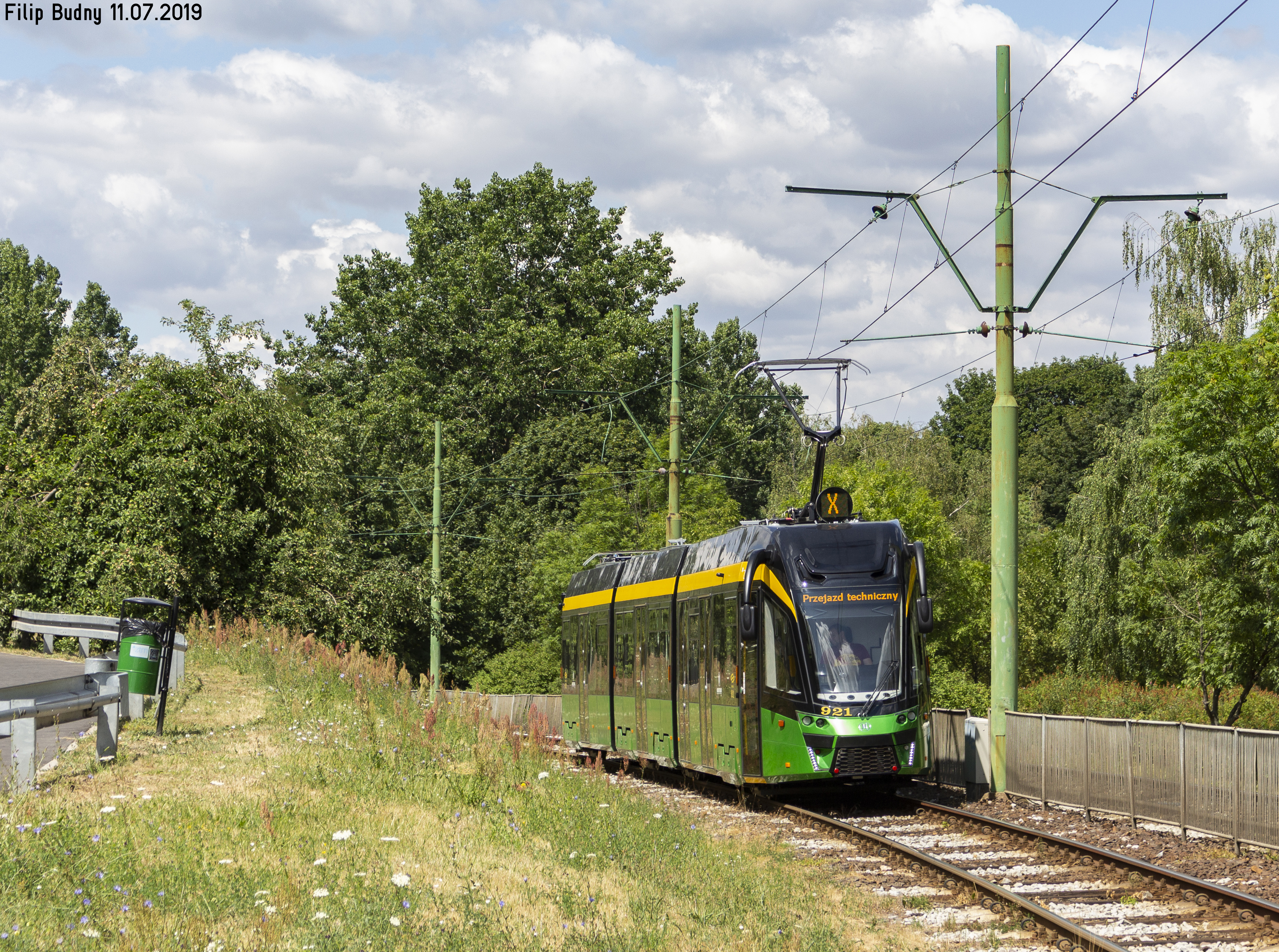
Gamma LF 03 AC BD for Poznań

Gamma LF 04 AC BD for Poznań

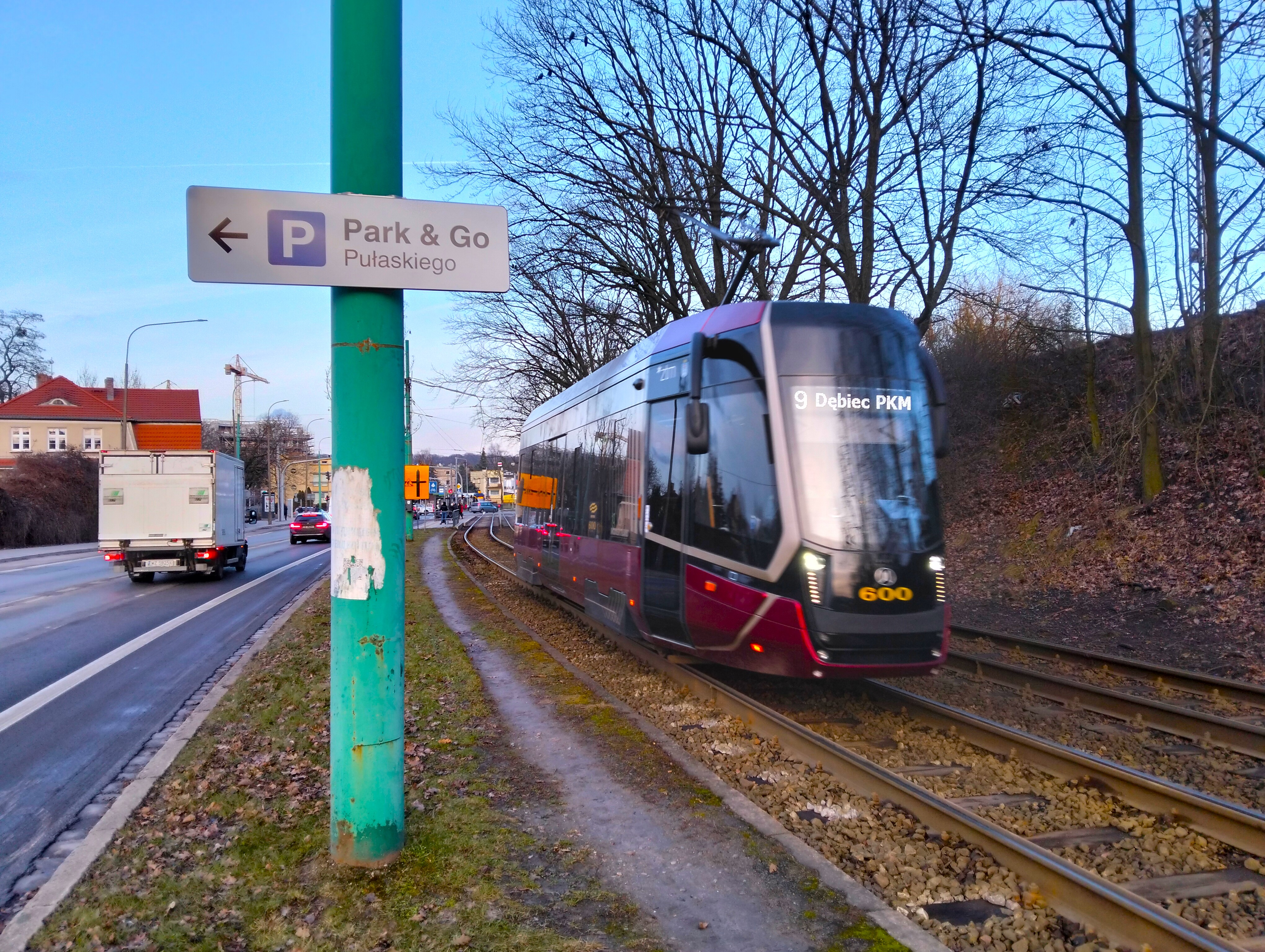
Gamma LF 05 AC for Poznań

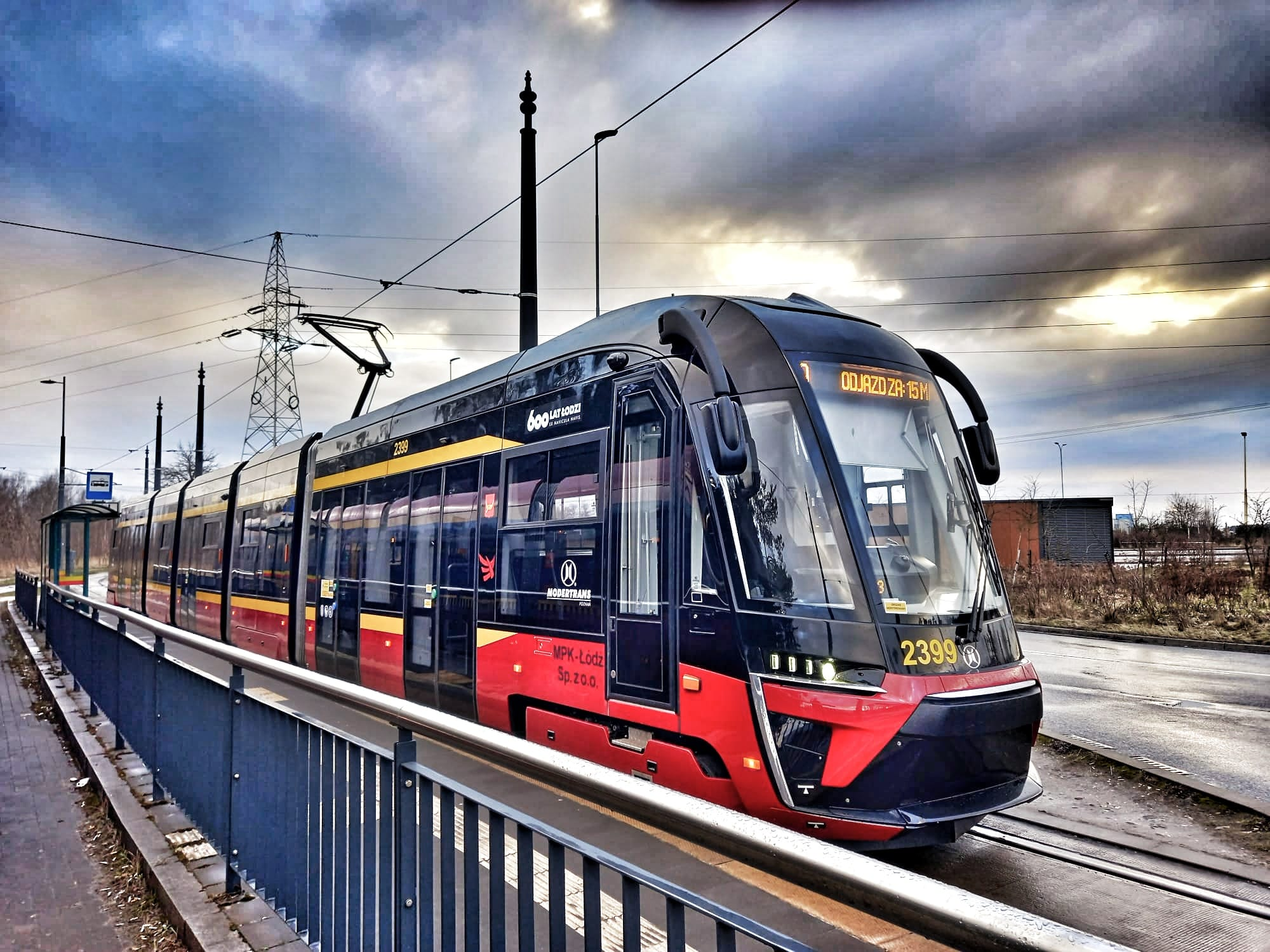
Gamma LF 06 AC for Łódź

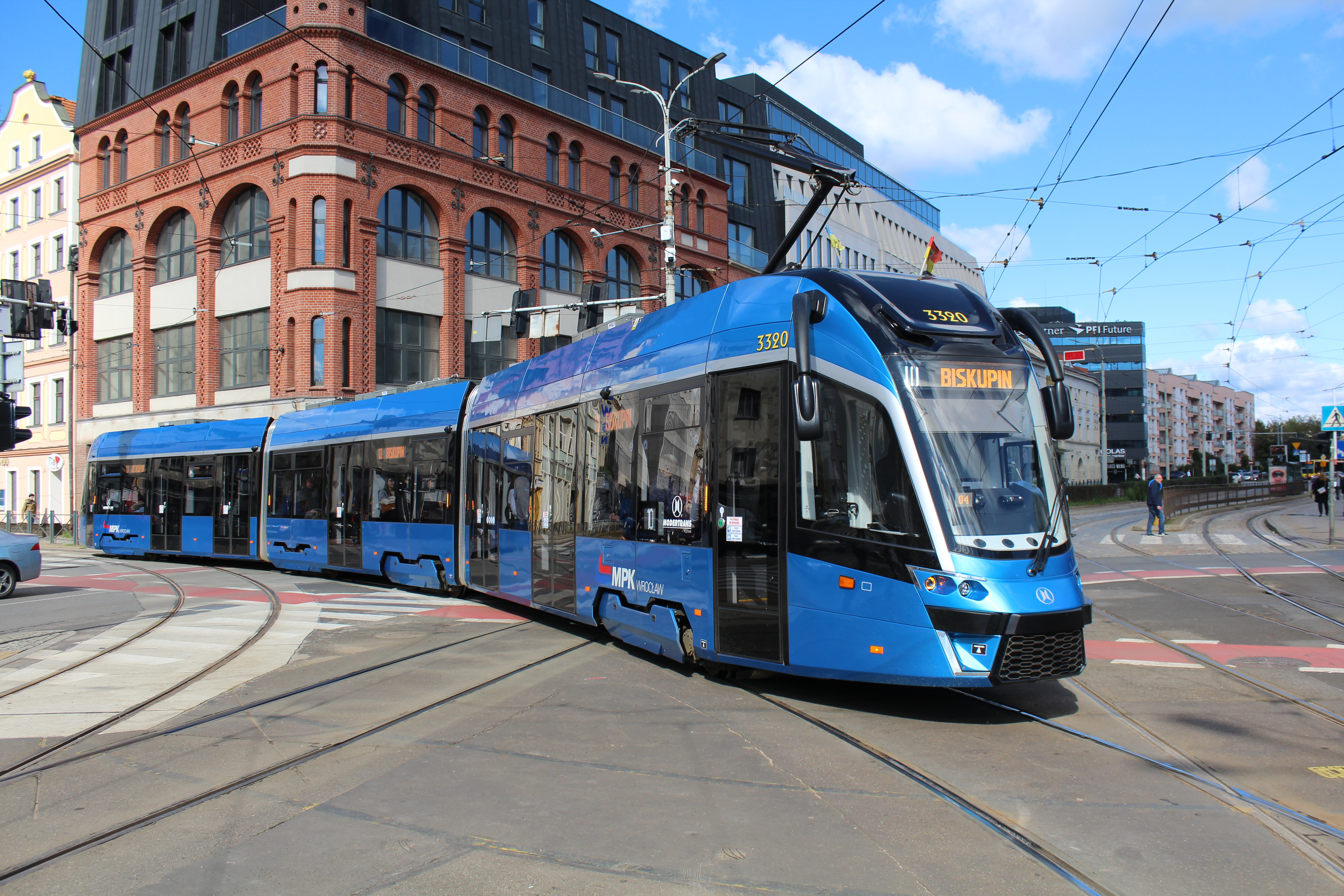
Gamma LF 07 AC for Wrocław

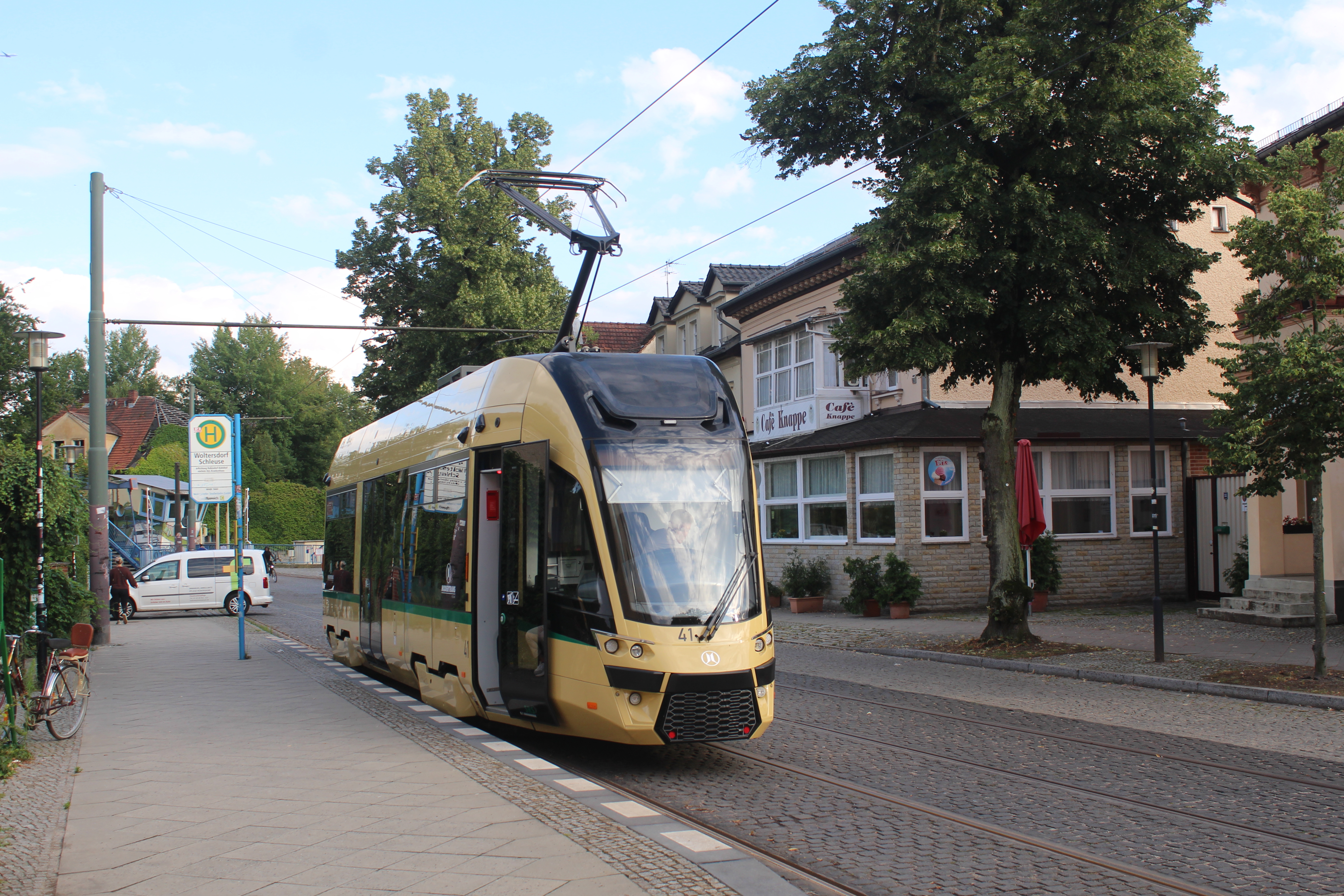
Gamma LF 10 AC BD for Woltersdrof
Other vehicles

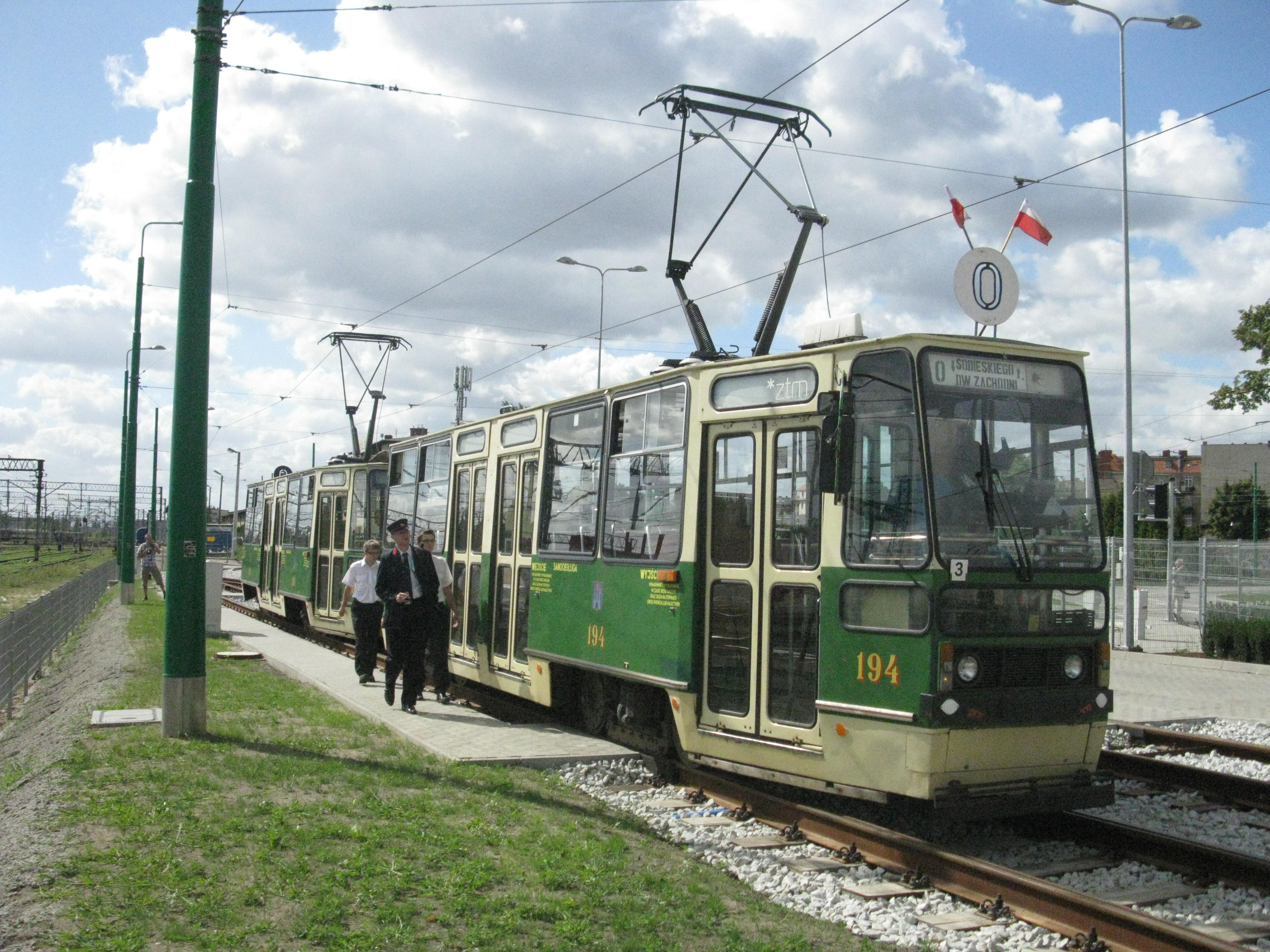
Historical 105N for Poznań

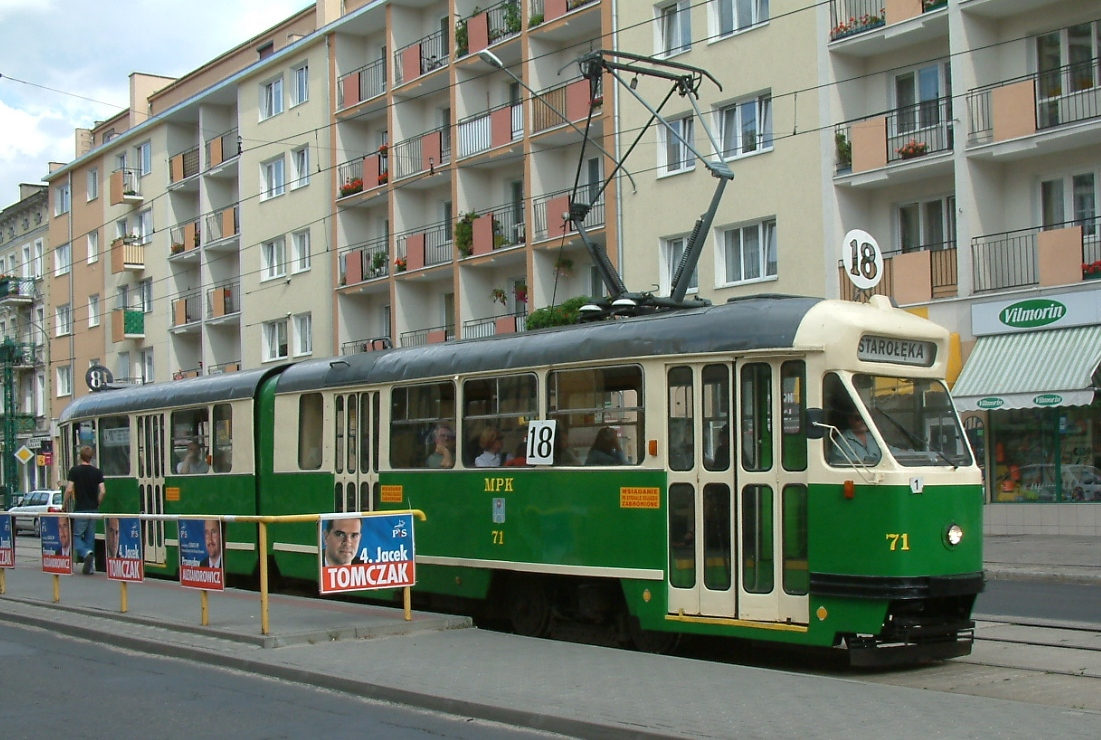
Historical 102Na for Poznań

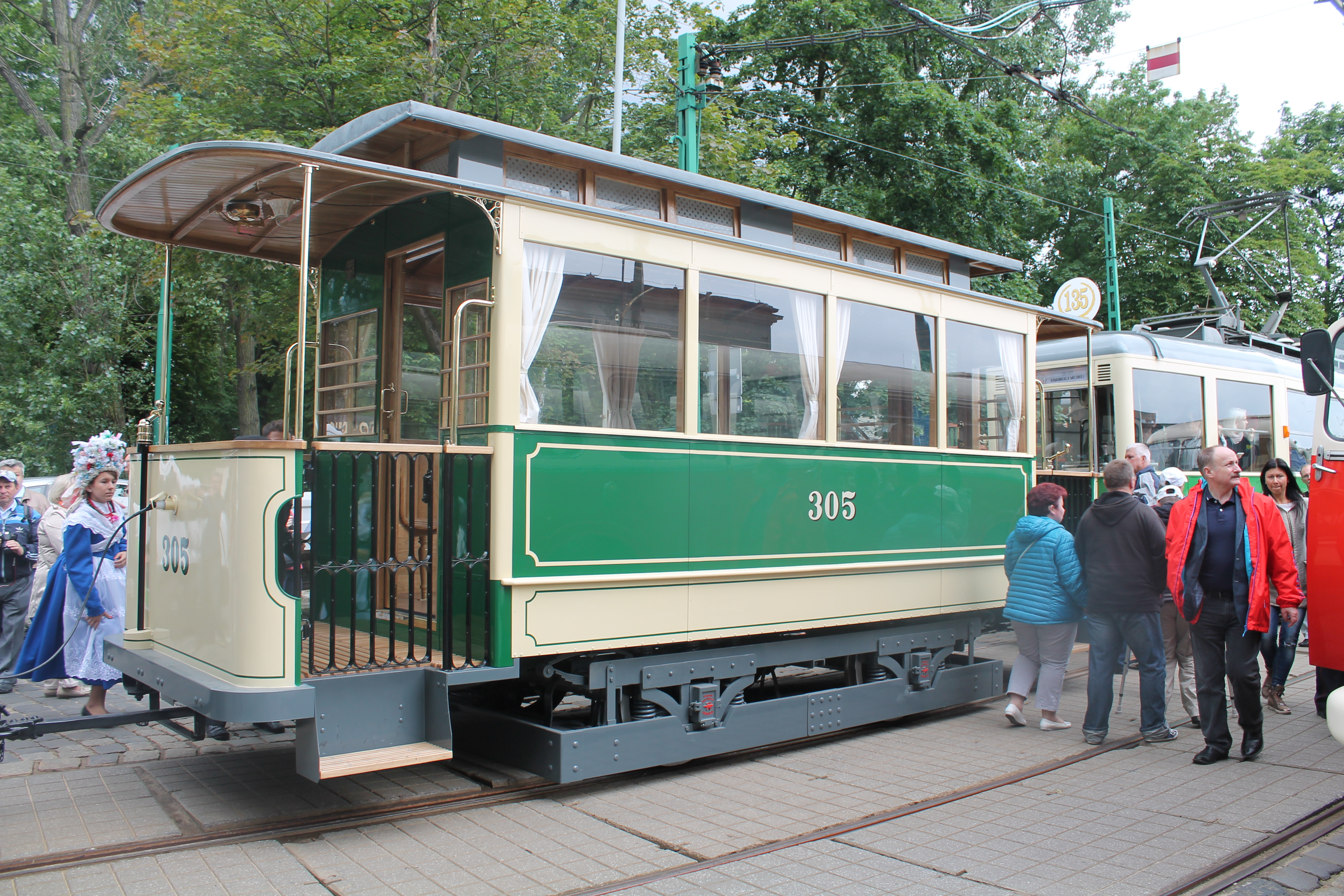
Reconstructed Carl Weyer for Poznań

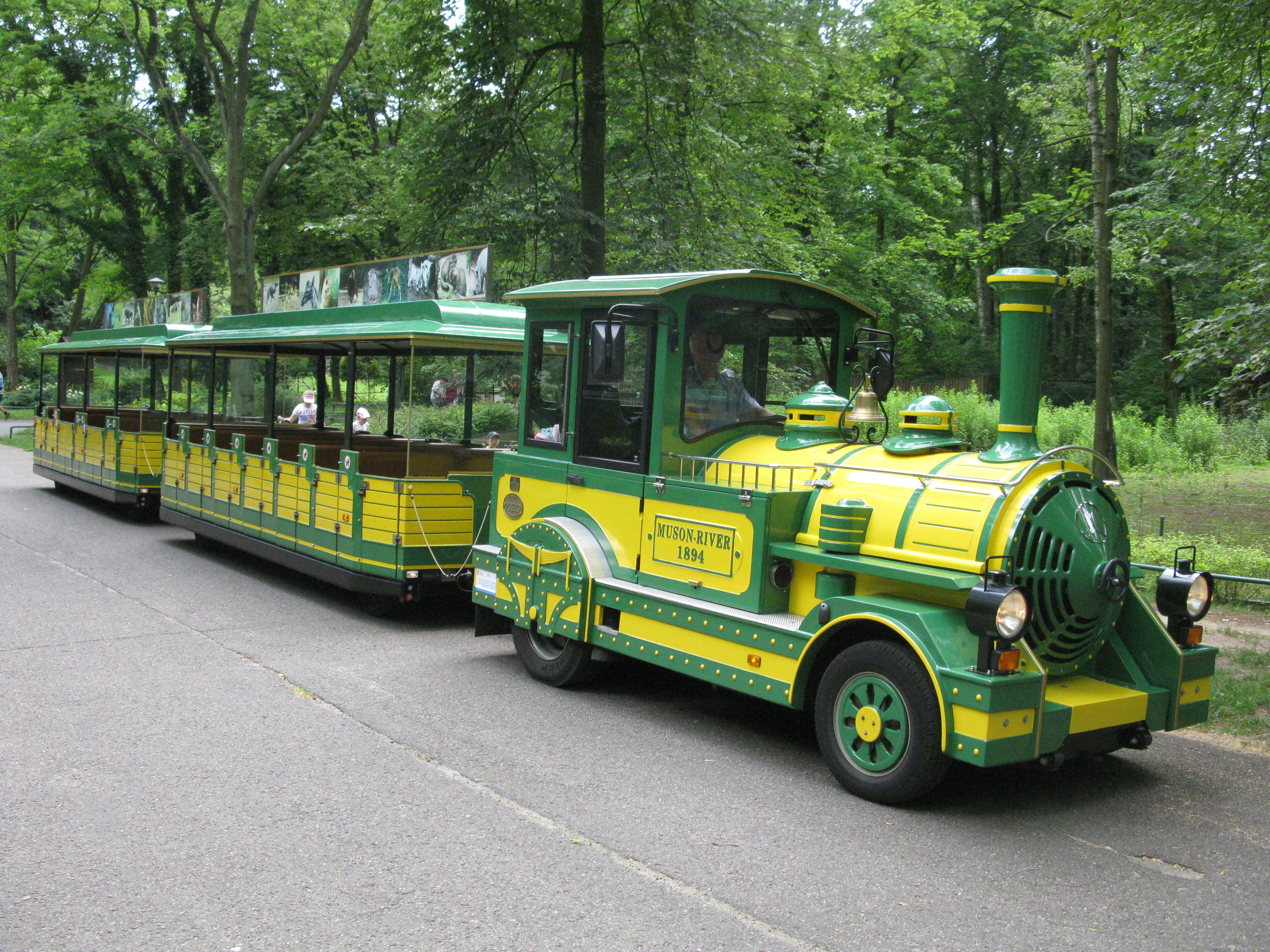
Moderino for Poznań Zoo

== Cooperation with education and science ==
Modertrans received funding for the following projects:

Project name	Project goal	Project cost	Funding	Implementation period	Sources
Innovative city tram	Gamma tram	14.115 million PLN	5.635 million PLN	1 November 2013 – 31 October 2016	
MFB – family of medium-floor tram bogies	Tram bogies	8.458 million PLN	4.106 million PLN	1 April 2014 – 31 March 2017	

== Financial results ==
In its first year of operation, Modertrans incurred a loss of over 1 million PLN. Between 2007 and 2009, the company recorded profits below 1 million PLN, but starting in 2010, these profits exceeded 1 million PLN and grew year by year. In 2015, they reached a record value of over 13 million PLN.

== Awards and recognitions ==
- 2007 – Ernest Malinowski Award for the most interesting product and technical innovation in railways for the MT-01H drive bogie at the Trako Fair.
- 2008 – 7th Place in the medium-sized companies category in the Ranking of the Most Innovative Companies in Poland, Kamerton Innowacyjności 2008.
- 2009 – distinction in the Competition for the title of Poznań Entrepreneurial Leader during the final gala at the Session Hall of the County Office in Poznań.
- 2011 – distinction for the initiative "Investments in the Economic Development of the Region and its Inhabitants" in the As Odpowiedzialnego Biznesu plebiscite.
- 2012 – distinction in the competition for the title of Poznań Entrepreneurial Leader in the medium-sized entrepreneur category during the final gala at the Poznań Stadium.
- 2013 – distinction in the Competition of the Chamber of Commerce for Urban Communication for the Professor Jan Podoski Award in the parts, components, and equipment category for the MT-08T 1435 technical bogie for Siemens Combino trams at the Trako Fair.
- 2016 – distinction in the Poznań Entrepreneurial Leader competition in the medium-sized entrepreneur category.
- 2017 – award in the Professor Jan Podoski Award competition in the rail rolling stock category for the Moderus Gamma LF 01 AC tram at the Trako Fair.
