= Silesian Interurbans =

Tram system in the Upper Silesian Conurbation in Poland

Silesian Trams

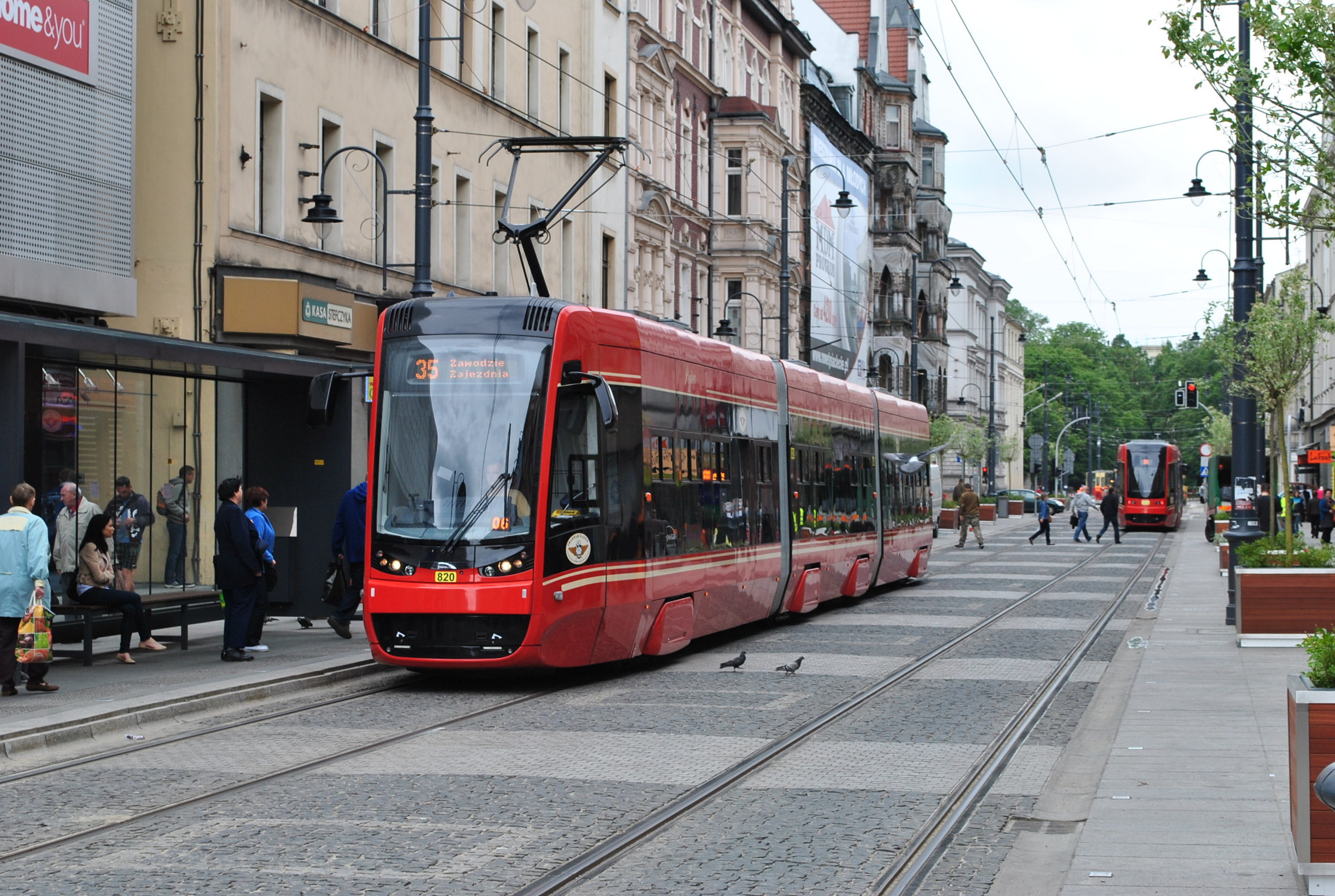
- Pesa Twist in Katowice

Operation
- Locale: Metropolis GZM, Poland

Statistics
Steam era: 1894–1898
- Status: Replaced by electric trams
- Owner: Oberschlesische Dampfstraßenbahnen
- Track gauge: 785 mm (2 ft 6 29/32 in)
- Propulsion system: Steam
- Depot: 2
- 1898: 3.6 million
Electric trams era: 1898–present
- Status: Operational
- Lines: 29 (2021)
- Owners: Metropolis GZM (13.35); Katowice City (47.05%); 9 more GZM constituent Gminas
- Operator: Tramwaje Śląskie
- Track gauge: 1,435 mm (4 ft 8 1/2 in)
- Propulsion system: Electricity
- Electrification: 660 V DC overhead line
- Depot: 5
- Track length (single): 58.7 km
- Track length (double): 119.65 km
- Track length (total): 299.7 km (186.2 mi)
- Route length: 178 km (111 mi)
- 2011: 99 million
- System map (2024)
- Website: https://www.metropoliaztm.pl/en/ metropoliaztm.pl

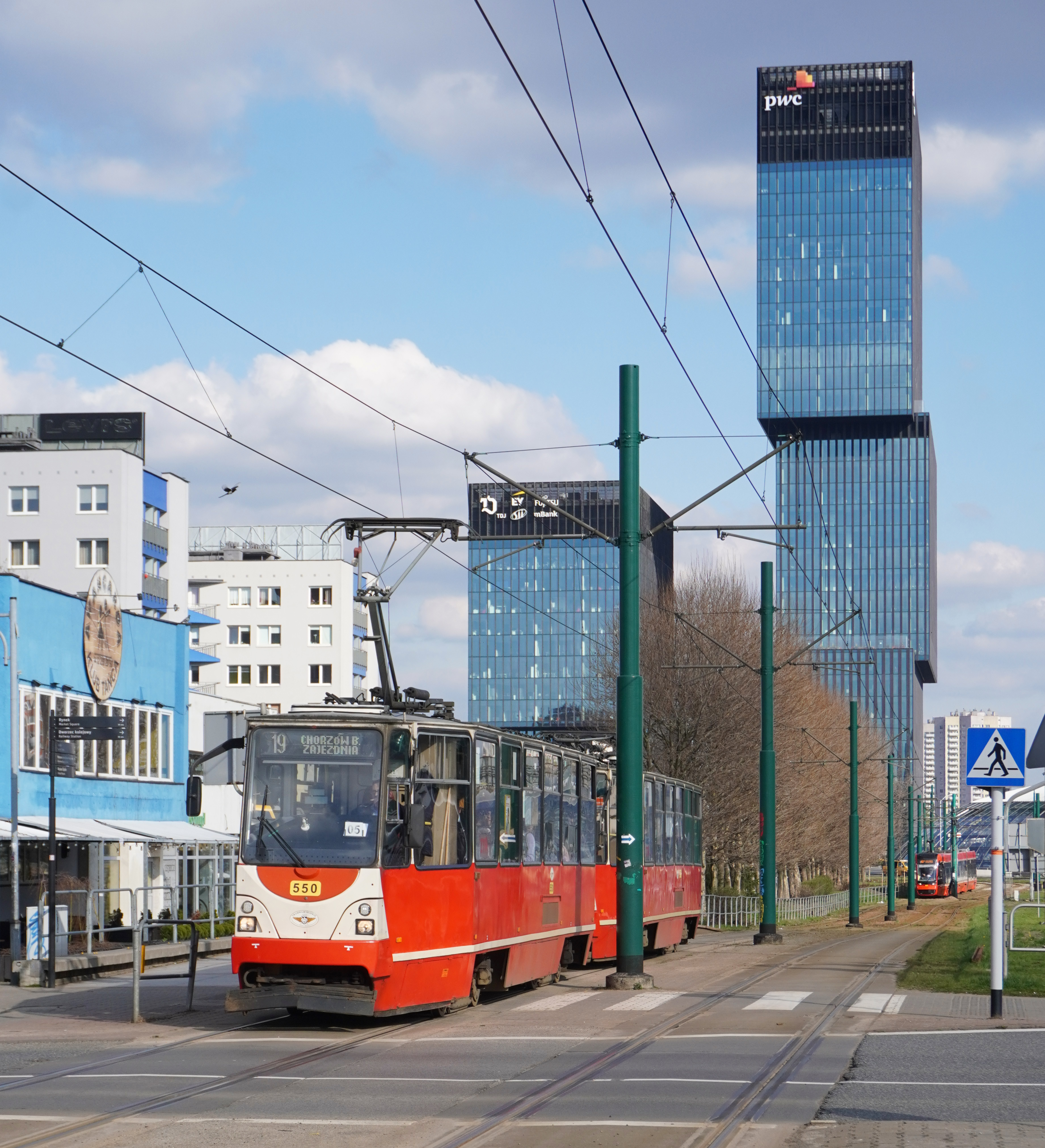
Katowice Sokolska.

Silesian Trams (Polish: Tramwaje Konurbacji Śląskiej) is one of the largest tram systems in the world and the largest and longest tram system in Poland, located entirely within the Silesian Voivodeship. Started as a part of the German Empire in 1894, the system currently has 677 stops across 29 lines and serves the region’s population inhabited by more than two million people. Silesian Trams is at the heart of a region known for its dense historical and current industrialisation (coal, coke, steel and other industries).

Due to the deindustrialization since the 1990s and subsequent lack of investment, several branches were decommissioned in waves. The system runs on a mixture of on-street track shared with other traffic and reserved track sections segregated from other traffic. The network is spread over more than 50 kilometres (east-west axis) and covers twelve cities and towns in the Metropolis GZM of southern Poland: Katowice, the capital city of the region, Bytom, Chorzów, Mysłowice, Ruda Śląska, Siemianowice Śląskie, Świętochłowice, and Zabrze in Upper Silesia, as well as Będzin, Czeladź, Dąbrowa Górnicza, and Sosnowiec in the Dąbrowa Basin. Until 2006, trams also frequented Piekary Śląskie and Wojkowice, and until 2009 trams ran through Gliwice (trams still run to the depot at the border of Gliwice and Zabrze where passengers can switch to buses).

The system is operated by Tramwaje Śląskie using a mixed fleet of modernized Konstal 105Na, Düwag and Lohner trams and brand new Pesa Twist trams. In recent years, the network benefited from investments from the European Union. Rolling stock was modernized to include low-floor cars and multiple track sections were upgraded. Recently, two major investments since cutbacks have been approved to extend the network length. A new section opened in December 2022 in Zagórze, Sosnowiec, and a connector track between Chorzowska and Gliwicka streets in downtown Katowice was opened in December 2023.

== History ==
=== Steam trains and early electrification ===
Initially planned as a metre-gauge, the system was established by German Empire in 1894 as a unique 785 mm (2 ft 6 29/32 in) narrow gauge steam interurban railway.

The first line was 36.5 km long and connected Gliwice with Piekary Śląskie through Zabrze, Chebzie, Chorzów and Bytom, another connected Katowice and Siemianowice. After four years, in 1898, Kramer & Co. was chosen to start electfication on Katowice Rynek (Kattowitz, Ring) - Zawodzie line, after which Schikora & Wolff completed electrification of four additional lines. In 1912, the first short 4 ft 8 1/2 in (1,435 mm) standard gauge line was built in Katowice. In 1913, a separate standard gauge system connecting Beuthen O.S. (Bytom) with suburbs and villages west of the city was launched.

=== Post World War I ===
After World War I and the Silesian Uprisings, in 1922 the region (and the tram network) was divided between newly independent Poland and Germany, and international services appeared (the last one ran until 1937). In 1928, further standard gauge systems were established in Sosnowiec, Będzin and Dąbrowa Górnicza (the so-called Dabrowa Coal Basin - a region adjoining the Upper Silesian Coal Basin).

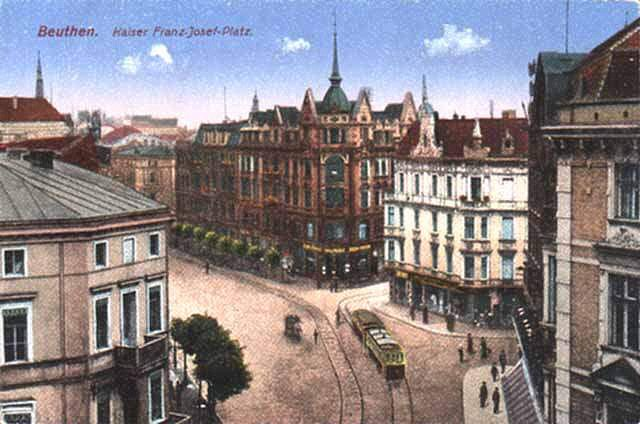
View of Bytom in 1915

Between 1928 and 1936, most of the original narrow gauge network was converted to standard, which allowed a connection with the new system in Sosnowiec. By 1931, 47,5% of the narrow-gauge network was reconstructed, with 20 km of new standard-gauge track built.

During World War II, the German authorities decided to merge all the systems and administrations and they have remained as one united network to the present day (though the old boundaries are still easily traceable).

In 1951, the tram system was taken over by a state-owned company WPK Katowice and until the 1970s it was widely extended and partly modernised reaching its maximum length at the end of the 1970s (ca. 235 km). The last and only remaining narrow gauge line was decommissioned in 1952 between Siemianowice Śląskie and Chorzów. Since the late 1960s, the classic rolling stock has been replaced by modern cars based on PCC streetcar technology.

In the 1980s some of the non-modernised, rural lines were abandoned (the longest one from Bytom to Wieszowa with a branch to Stolarzowice). Between 1976 and 1986, the first wave of tram line decommissioning began in Silesia. Six lines in total were decommissioned in a ten-year period. Aging tram cars and infrastructure as well as dwindling passenger numbers saw passengers switch to buses. In addition, the future of a seventh line was being contested. In 1979, line no. 38 was suspended in Bytom, however it returned to service on 10 February 1982 after citizens of Bytom petitioned for the line to reopen.

=== Post-communism decline ===
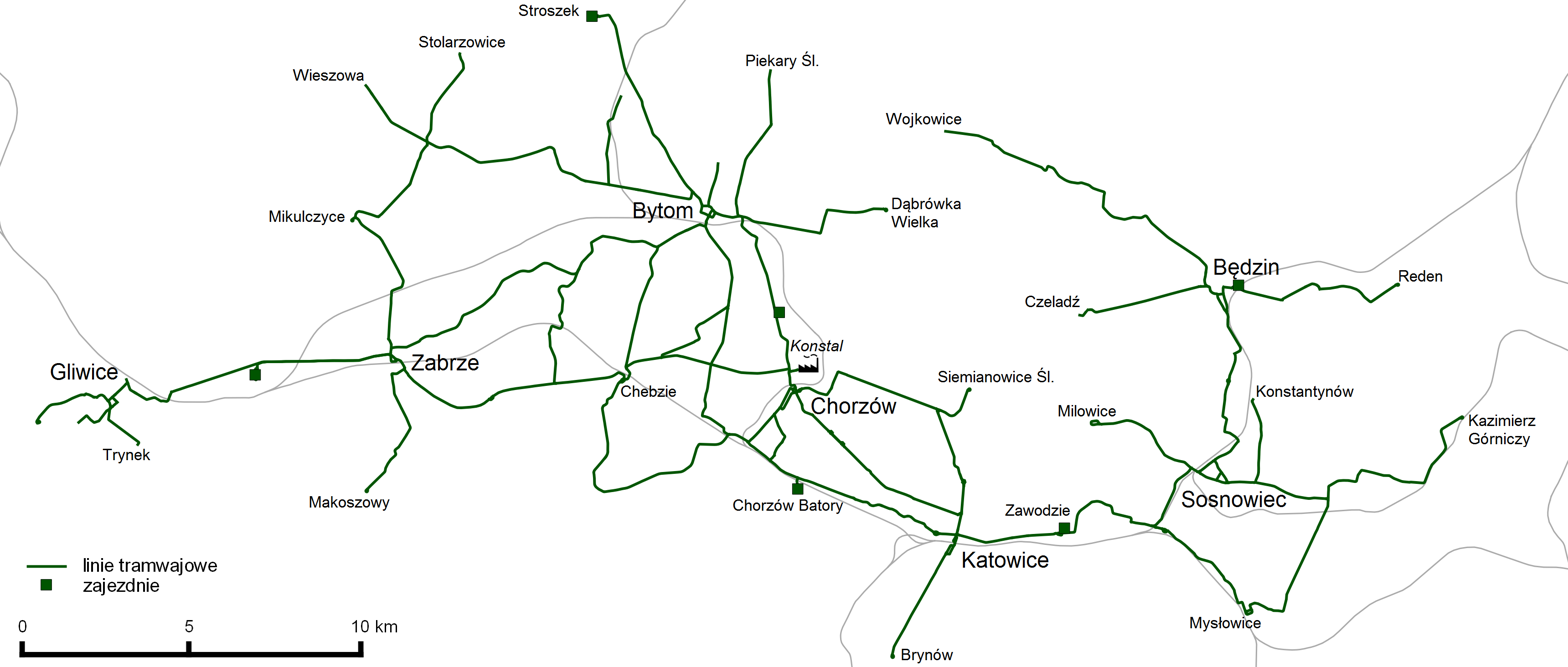
Upper Silesia conurbation tram network at the end of 1975

The end of the 1980s brought changes in Poland (the Round Table talks and the fall of communism). Unfortunately, that did not improve the tramway service in the region – on the contrary, the condition of the tram company had been steadily deteriorating since the middle of the 1990s. In September 1991, the state-owned WPK Katowice was liquidated. As a result, PKT was created. PKT started to operate on behalf of KZK GOP, a Silesian interurban transport body.

At the end of the 1990s the Bytom – Chorzów – Katowice line was to be upgraded to light-rail (LRT) standards. Due to a lack of funds, the investment was only partially carried out.

In February 1998, an agreement was signed with the French-British concern GEC Alsthom (currently Alstom) for the delivery of Citadis 100 streetcars. The new trams were built in Chorzów's Alstom plant (after Konstal was sold to Alstom in 1997). Further track modernization was also tendered. The new streetcars were to be delivered by the end of 1999 and the track renovation was to be completed by 18 October 2000.

However, there were obstacles to that schedule: On 1 January 1999, as part of an administrative reform the Silesian Voivodeship was established, which resulted in transferring the management of the investment to the Office of the Marshal of the Silesian Voivodeship and in limiting budget funds for the execution of the investment. First Citadis tram entered service on 3 May 2001 and deliveries of all trams were complete by 11 October 2001. These new trams gained the endearing nickname Karlik during a public vote in 2001.

On 5 December 2002, the Ministry of Treasury signed the notarial deed of commercialization of Przedsiębiorstwo Komunikacji Tramwajowej. A sole shareholder company of the State Treasury - Tramwaje Śląskie - was created and it started its operation on 1 January 2003. The changes included only formal matters such as the name or the graphic symbols; the rules of financing the streetcar transport were not changed.

Liquidation of the state-owned WPK Katowice back in 1991 caused an organizational mess: bus lines were financed by individual gminas across the region, the issue of subsidizing intercity connections was unclear and tram transport was limited by funds from the state budget. This led the tram system to the brink of bankruptcy. To alleviate these issues, the presidents of Upper Silesian cities signed an agreement in Gliwice on 9 December 2005 which aimed to centralize transport and establish the Upper Silesia conurbation as a metropolis.

=== Austerity measures for the network ===
At the beginning of the 21st century due to the unprofitability of the network and the move towards buses, a second wave of line decommissioning began on the Silesian Interurban network which saw closure of five lines:

- On 1 April 2006 the line between Bytom and the terminus in Dąbrówka Wielka (a district of Piekary Śląskie).
- On 1 January 2007 the line between Będzin and the Żychcice loop in Wojkowice.
- On 31 July 2008 the line between Bytom city centre and Łagiewniki district (the line was reactivated in 2014).
- On 1 January 2009 the line between Hutników Square in Chorzów and Alfreda Square in Wełnowiec district of Katowice.

On 1 September 2009 the line between the terminus in Wójtowa Wieś (a district of Gliwice) and the Gliwice depot was terminated. The closure of the tram line in Gliwice made trams disappear from Gliwice entirely. As a result, residents of Gliwice requested a referendum on the dismissal of its president. The referendum was held on 8 November 2009 and due to the low turnout, its results turned out to be non-binding.

=== Recent times ===
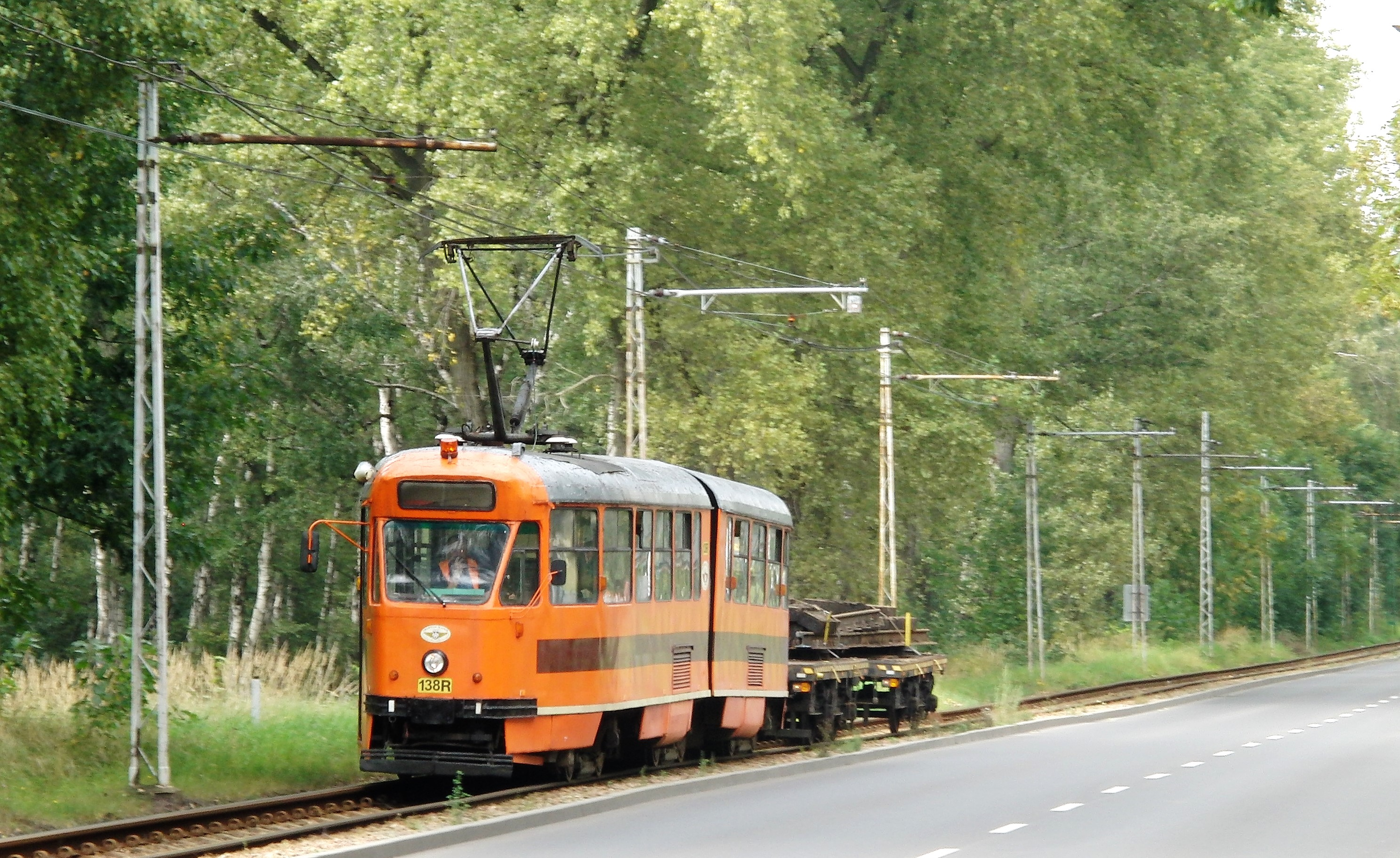
Works tram towing scrapped pointwork from Alfred to Katowice, 10 September 2011

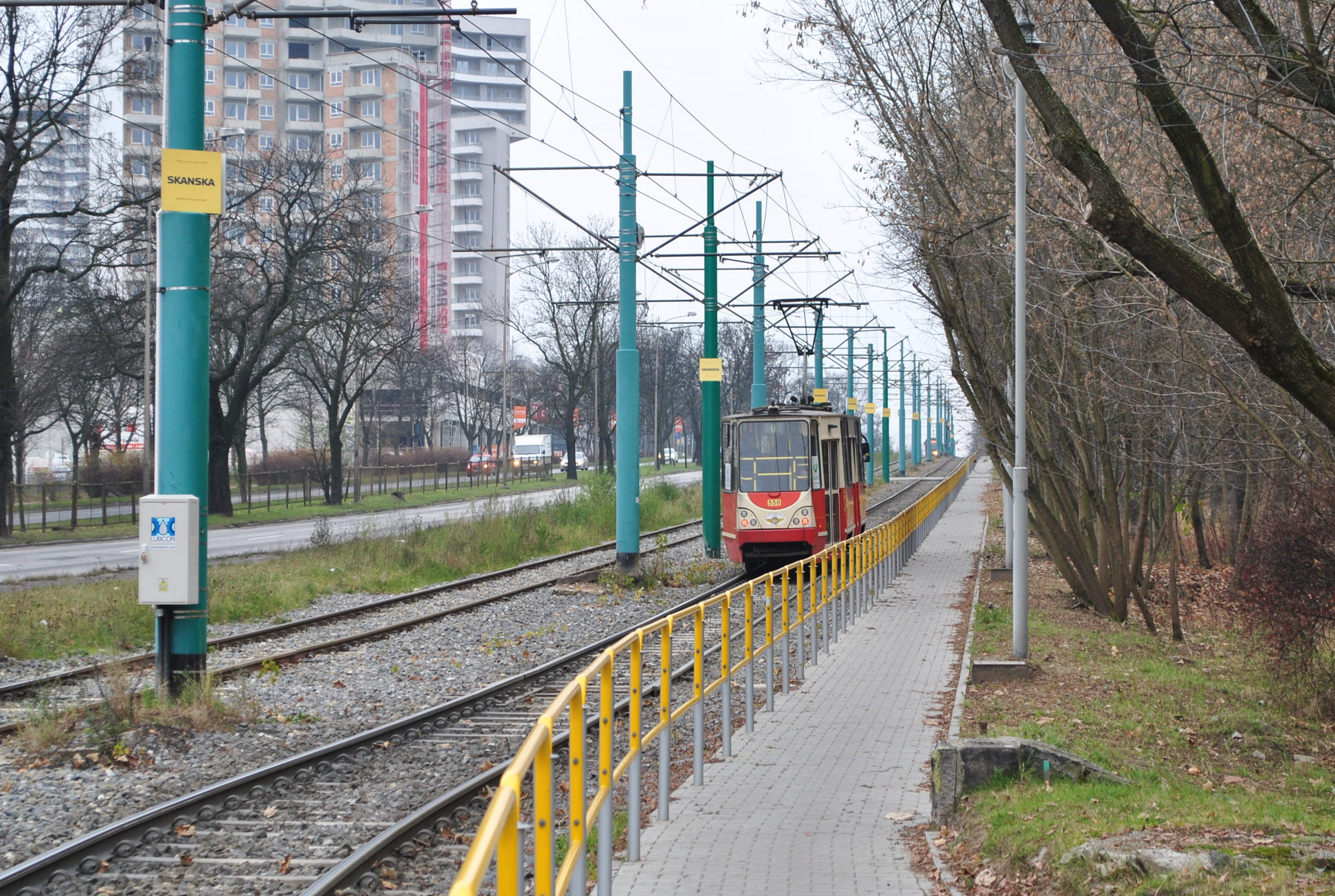
Upgraded reserved track on Chorzowska Street in Chorzów, near Silesian Park

In February 2011, city authorities of the Upper Silesian conurbation decided to launch the project "Modernization of Tram and Trolleybus Infrastructure in the Upper Silesian Agglomeration". The implementation of the project lasted from October 2012 to December 2015.

Within the first stage of the project, the following investments were made:

- 48km of tracks were modernized (including Bytom – Łagiewniki section) and the catenary network was reconstructed.
- 30 2012N Twist low-floor streetcars were purchased and delivered by Pesa under an agreement of 10 December 2012.
- 75 105Na streetcars were modernised. 45 streetcars were modernized by consortium of Modertrans and MPK-Łódź and remaining 30 streetcars were modernized by Zakład Usługowo-Remontowy Tramwajów Śląskich using parts delivered by consortium of Modertrans and MPK-Łódź.

The contract for modernization and parts supply was signed on 30 July 2012. The first modernized 105Na was presented on 17 December 2012, and on 22 November 2013 the first Twist was presented in Zabrze. On 14 May 2014 Twists started running with passengers and on 29 June line no. 7 Bytom - Łagiewniki was reactivated.

Thanks to the favourable outcome of tenders and the resulting savings, Silesian Trams were able to enter the second stage of the project in which 15km of tracks were modernised, the traction network was reconstructed and 12 partially low-floor, bi-directional MF 16 AC BD Beta streetcars were delivered by Modertrans under a contract dated 27 November 2014. The total investment cost was PLN 626.95 million, of which 490.49 million PLN was financed by the EU under the Infrastructure and Environment Programme. The investments were also supported by a loan from the European Investment Bank.

Despite significant investment from EU funds, line no. 18 Stroszek - Chebzie was decommissioned on 14 February 2015, making streetcars completely disappear from a 4 km long section in Ruda (a district of Ruda Śląska).

Within the EU financial perspective 2014-2020, Silesian Trams implemented the project "Integrated project of modernization and development of tramway infrastructure in Silesian-Zagłębiowska Agglomeration together with purchase of tramway rolling stock". The original plans included the acquisition of at least 45 new streetcars and renovations of over 100km tracks across Silesia. Further plans included an extension to line no. 15 in Zagórze, a southern Katowice line extension and building a connector between Chorzowska and Gliwicka streets in Katowice. It was also planned to extend line 6 to Miechowice; however, the authorities of Bytom withdrew from this idea.

On 20 March 2017, the implementation of first repair task from this project began, and on 11 December 2017 and 26 February 2018, agreements were signed to subsidize above investments with 491 million PLN under the OPI&E.

On 28 April 2020, Silesian Trams signed a contract with a consortium of Eurovia Polska, KZN Rail and Nowak Mosty for the extension of line 15 deep into the Zagórze estate.

On 16 March 2022, a contract was signed for the construction of a new reserved track section along Grundmann Street in Katowice connecting Chorzowska and Gliwicka streets in Katowice aimed to provide a relief for the main branch across Katowice.

On 19 December 2022, a new section of line 15 in Sosnowiec was put into operation from the Zagórze loop to the new Zagórze Rondo Jana Pawła II loop. The line is operated by low-floor rolling stock, with a frequency of 15 minutes.

In December 2023, the connector track between Chorzowska and Gliwicka streets in downtown Katowice was opened.

=== Future developments ===
On 23 October 2026, a new tender was announced for the tram line to south Katowice. A total of 14 bids were submitted during the tender process, with values ranging from 356 million to 522 million PLN. Ultimately, the tender committee selected the bid from Budimex S.A., valued at just over 356.8 million PLN.

Construction of a new tram line (approximately 4.6 km in length) will feature the Kostuchna transport hub, a bicycle path running along nearly the entire route, as well as Park&Ride and Bike&Ride facilities. Once the selection of the contractor has been finalized and the contract signed, the contractor will have 30 months to complete the project.

== Infrastructure ==
The tram network in the Upper Silesian conurbation consists of a total of 336.1 km of single track with a gauge of 1435 mm, of which 297.2 km are used in passenger traffic (including tracks in the depot and loop, as of 13 September 2023):

- 55.5 km of single-track sections,
- 120 km of double track sections (240 km of single track),
- 29 km of tracks in the depot,
- 11.6 km of tram loop tracks.

A total of 391 switches are installed in the track, and 271 in the depot (as of 29 May 2018).

=== Lines ===
As of 14 March 2022, 29 numbered lines operate with a regular schedule on Silesian tram network. The total track length is 299.7 km, with a total route length of 178 km. Between Monday to Friday, the network runs lines using ca. 200 vehicles. At 22.55 km, line no. 21 is the longest on the network, with line no. 38 being the shortest, measuring a total length of 1.35 km.

Line	Terminus		Length	Stops	Cities	Depot
1	Gliwice Zajezdnia	Chebzie Pętla	12.60 km	22	Gliwice, Zabrze, Ruda Śląska	Gliwice
2	Gliwice Zajezdnia	Bytom Plac Sikorskiego	16.50 km	25	Gliwice, Zabrze	Gliwice, Stroszek
3	Mikulczyce Pętla	Makoszowy Pętla	10.45 km	20	Zabrze	Gliwice
4	Gliwice Zajezdnia	Zaborze Pętla	7.85 km	16	Gliwice, Zabrze	Gliwice
5	Bytom Plac Sikorskiego	Zaborze Pętla	16.30 km	24	Zabrze, Bytom	Gliwice, Stroszek
6	Bytom Szkoła Medyczna	Brynów Centrum Przesiadkowe	20.45 km	45	Bytom, Chorzów, Katowice	Stroszek, Zawodzie
7	Bytom Plac Sikorskiego	Zawodzie Centrum Przesiadkowe	18.55 km	37	Bytom, Świętochłowice, Chorzów, Katowice	Stroszek, Zawodzie
9	Chebzie Pętla	Chorzów Batory Zajezdnia	10.70 km	20	Ruda Śląska, Świętochłowice, Chorzów	Gliwice
11	Chorzów Metalowców	Katowice Plac Miarki	18.50 km	16	Chorzów, Katowice	Stroszek
13	Siemianowice Plac Skargi	Katowice Plac Wolności	6.45 km	12	Siemianowice Śląskie, Katowice	Zawodzie
14	Brynów Centrum Przesiadkowe	Mysłowice Dworzec PKP	15.15 km	33	Katowice, Mysłowice	Zawodzie
15	Katowice Plac Wolności	Zagórze Pętla	14.75 km	28	Katowice, Sosnowiec	Zawodzie
16	Wełnowiec Plac Alfreda	Brynów Centrum Przesiadkowe	8.15 km	18	Katowice	Zawodzie
17	Lipiny Mijanka	Chorzów Batory Zajezdnia	9.40 km	17	Świętochłowice, Bytom, Chorzów	Gliwice, Stroszek
19	Stroszek Zajezdnia	Katowice Plac Wolności	21.75 km	43	Bytom, Chorzów, Katowice	Stroszek, Zawodzie
20	Chorzów Batory Zajezdnia	Szopienice Pętla	12.35 km	25	Chorzów, Katowice	Zawodzie
21	Milowice Pętla	Tworzeń Huta Katowice	22.55 km	42	Sosnowiec, Będzin, Dąbrowa Górnicza	Będzin
22	Czeladź Kombatantów	Tworzeń Huta Katowice	15.80 km	26	Czeladź, Będzin, Dąbrowa Górnicza	Będzin
23	Chorzów Stadion Śląski Pętla Zachodnia	Zawodzie Centrum Przesiadkowe	10.40 km	24	Chorzów, Katowice	Zawodzie
24	Sosnowiec Ostrogórska	Konstantynów Okrzei	3.35 km	8	Sosnowiec	Będzin
26	Mysłowice Dworzec PKP	Pogoń Akademiki	12.60 km	23	Mysłowice, Sosnowiec	Będzin
27	Kazimierz Górniczy Pętla	Osiedle Zamkowe Pętla	18.20 km	36	Sosnowiec, Będzin	Będzin
28	Osiedle Zamkowe Pętla	Tworzeń Huta Katowice	13.10 km	23	Będzin, Dąbrowa Górnicza	Będzin
35	Milowice Pętla	Zagórze Pętla	8.90 km	16	Sosnowiec	Będzin
36	Szopienice Pętla	Brynów Centrum Przesiadkowe	11.35 km	26	Katowice	Zawodzie
38	Bytom Powstańców Śląskich	Bytom Kościół św. Trójcy	1.35 km	5	Bytom	Stroszek
43	Chorzów Batory Zajezdnia	Koszutka Słoneczna Pętla	6.75 km	15	Chorzów, Katowice	Gliwice
46	Brynów Centrum Przesiadkowe	Koszutka Słoneczna Pętla	5.65 km	16	Katowice	Zawodzie
49	Stroszek Zajezdnia	Bytom Plac Sikorskiego	7.55 km	16	Bytom	Stroszek

=== Depots ===
Trams are positioned across four depots, each serving a respective area of the network: area 1 Będzin, area 2 Katowice-Zawodzie, area 3 Bytom-Stroszek and area 4 depot in between Gliwice and Zabrze.

The depot in Zawodzie opened in 1962, after a closure of the Katowice depot. In 1968, Bytom's depot at Piekarska street was decommissioned, and a new depot was built in Stroszek at the end of a new line. Subsequently, the depot in Rozbark (a district of Bytom) was closed from which all of the equipment was moved. Zabrze and Gliwice got their new depot in 1972, while Będzin benefited from a brand new depot in 1978.

In 2006, a decision was taken to stop using the Chorzów Batory depot for line traffic. Between 15 June and 12 August the service was gradually transferred to other depots, while the Chorzów Batory depot became a maintenance depot. Chorzów Batory depot was subsequently renamed to ZUR (Tram Repair Facility, Polish: Zakład Usługowo Remontowy).

== Corporate ==
=== Administration ===
Prior to January 2019, KZK GOP was the transport authority in Silesia. On 1 January 2019, a metropolitan transport authority was established also known as the ZTM, thus Tramwaje Śląskie became a carrier operating on behalf of ZTM.

=== Passenger numbers ===
In the steam era, the network recorded 3.6 million passengers in 1898. In 1900, the network recorded 7.6 million passengers.

After World War II, the passenger numbers gradually increased year on year, and in the 1950s, the numbers stabilised at 300 million passengers per year. In 1983, the network saw record passenger numbers – 353 million. Since 1983, passenger numbers have fallen each year, however detailed passenger numbers are not readily available for recent years.

== Rolling stock ==
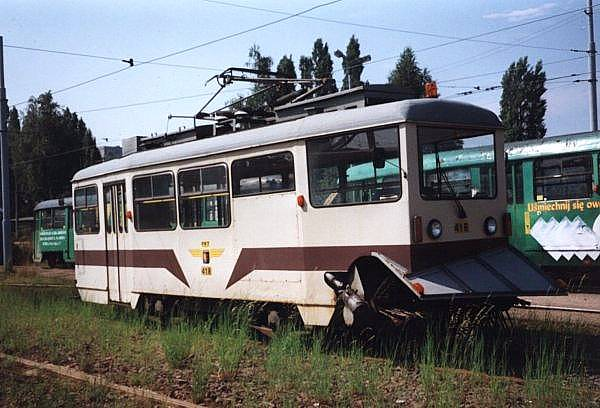
N-type-based snow plough

=== In service ===
Series	Units	Seats	Low floor	Manufacturer
N	2	16	0%	Konstal
105N	1	20	0%	Konstal
105Na	89	20	0%	Konstal
105N-2k	31	20	0%	Konstal
105N-2k	31	20	0%	Konstal
105N HF 11 AC	45	20	0%	Alstom Konstal
105NF S	31	20	0%	Alstom Konstal
111N	6	20	0%	Alstom Konstal
116Nd Citadis	17	46	73%	Alstom Konstal
2012N Twist	30	77	73%	Pesa
2012N-10 Twist	8	77	75%	Pesa
2017N Twist	32	59	65,6%	Pesa
E1	18	40	0%	SGP / Lohner
PtB	8	62	0%	Düwag
Ptm	7	57	23%	Düwag
MF 16 AC BD Beta	12	46	26%	Modertrans Poznań
MF 10 AC Beta	13	≥ 18	≥ 20%	Modertrans Poznań
MF 11 AC BD Beta	2	≥ 18	≥ 20%	Modertrans Poznań

=== Museum cars ===
Series	Nr	Year	Manufactuter
N	1100	1953	Konstal
4N	1167	1957	Konstal
4ND1	1263	1959	Konstal
13N	308	1967	Konstal
102N	8	1970	Konstal
102Na	183	1970	Konstal
105N	338	1975	Konstal
105N	546	1978	Konstal

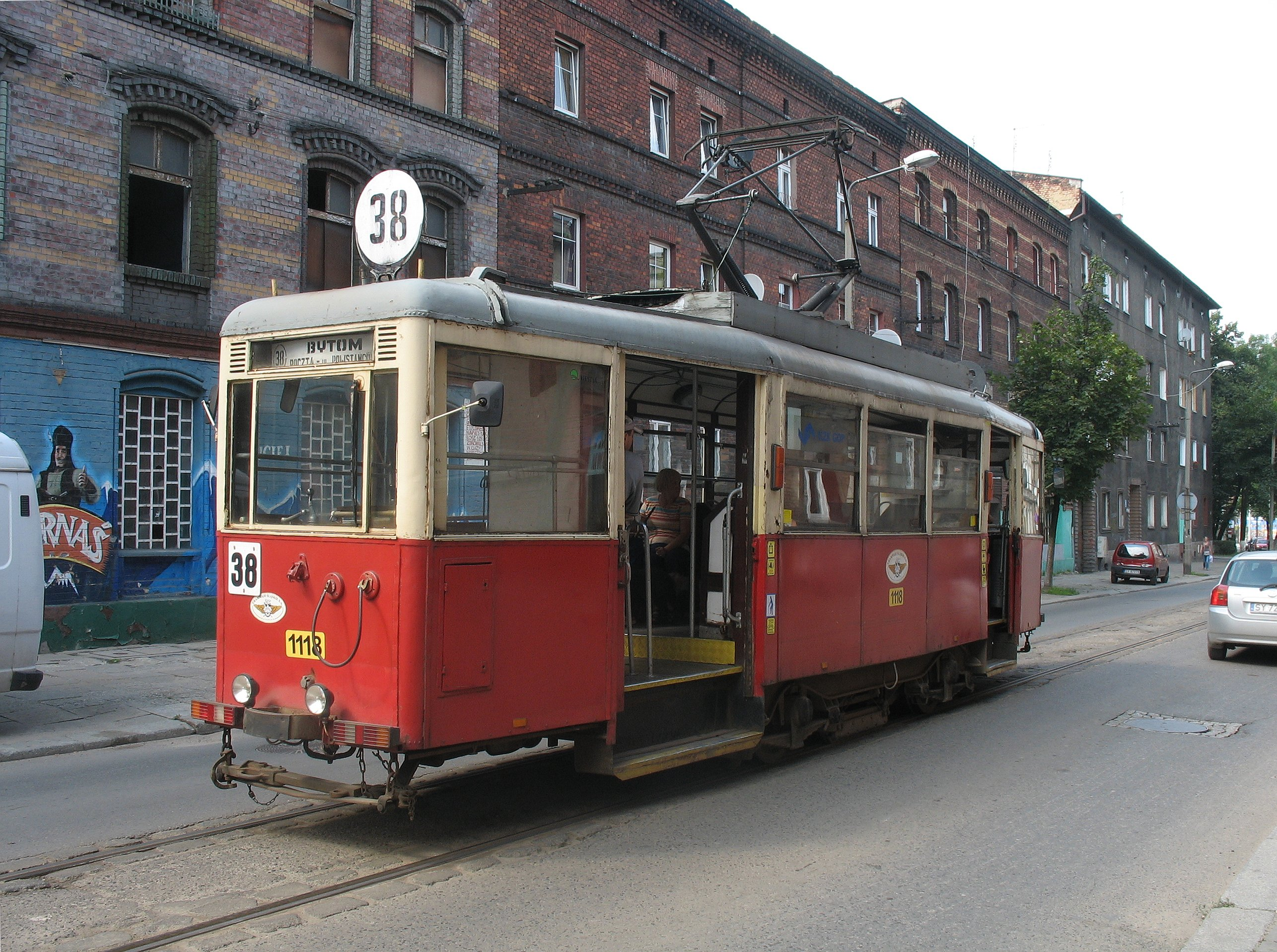
Konstal N

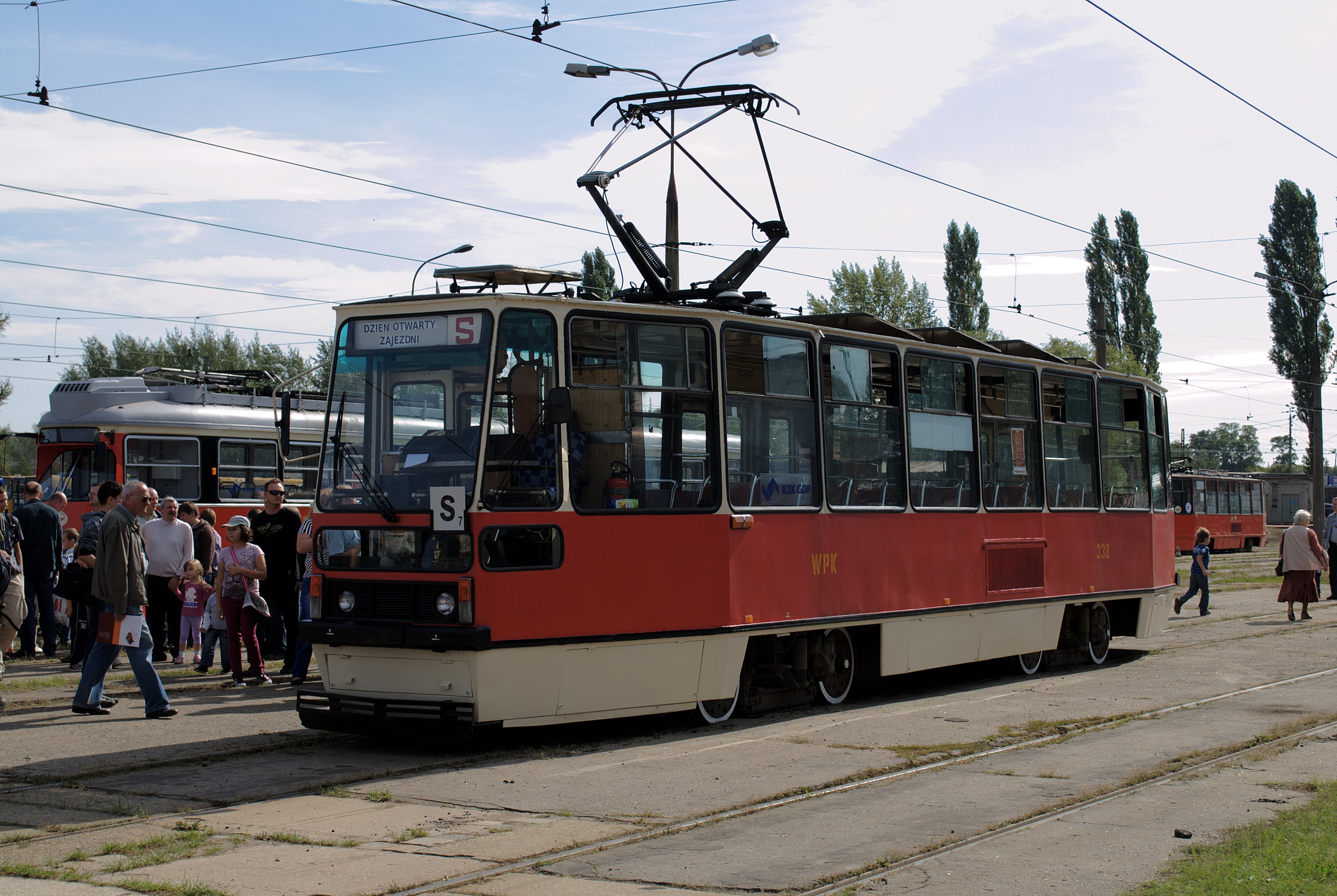
Konstal 105N

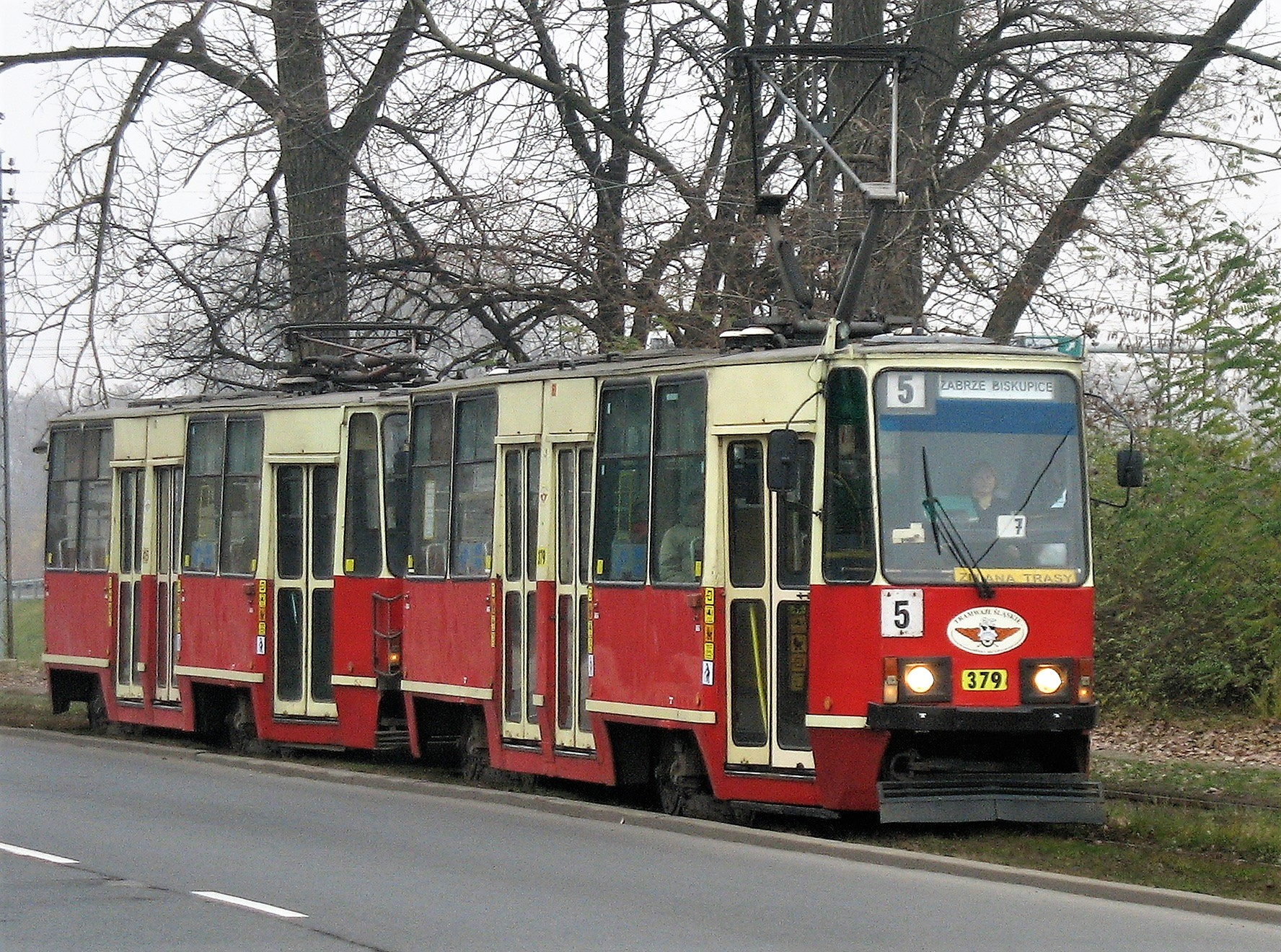
Konstal 105Na

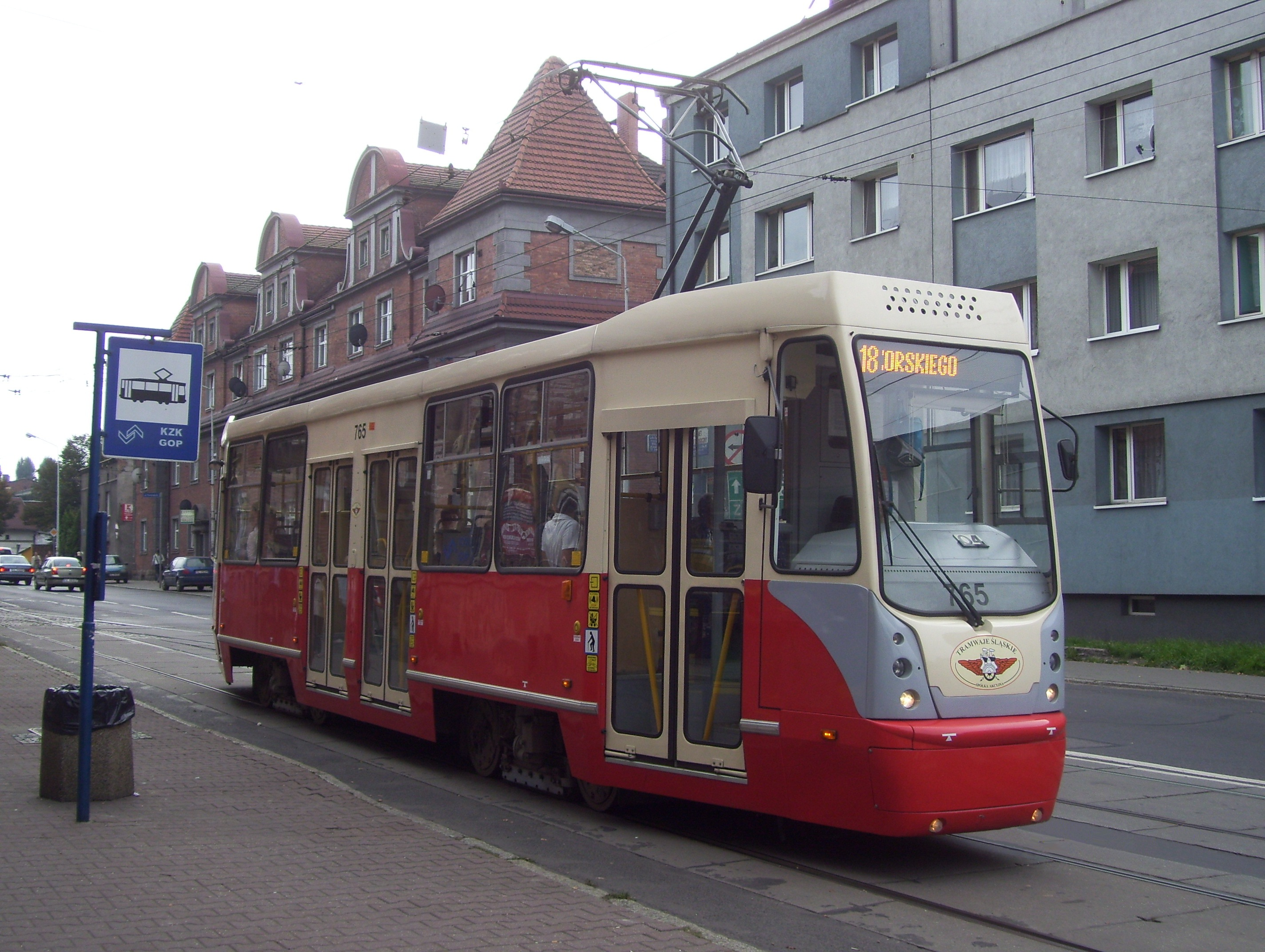
Konstal 105-2K

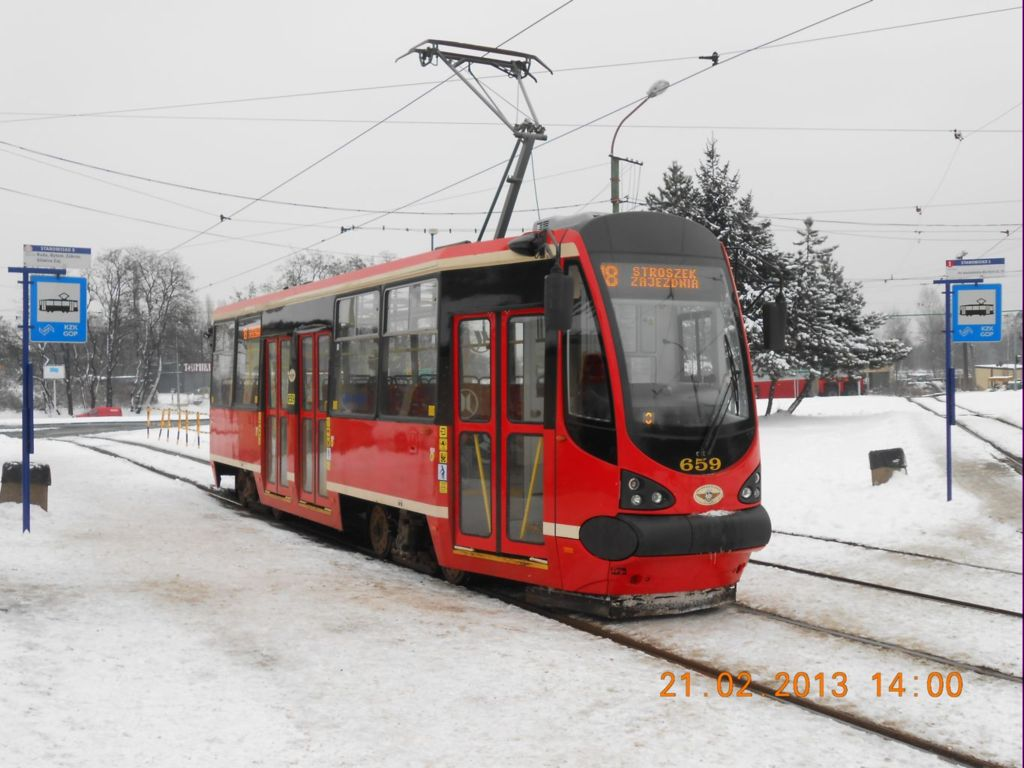
Konstal 105N HF 11 AC

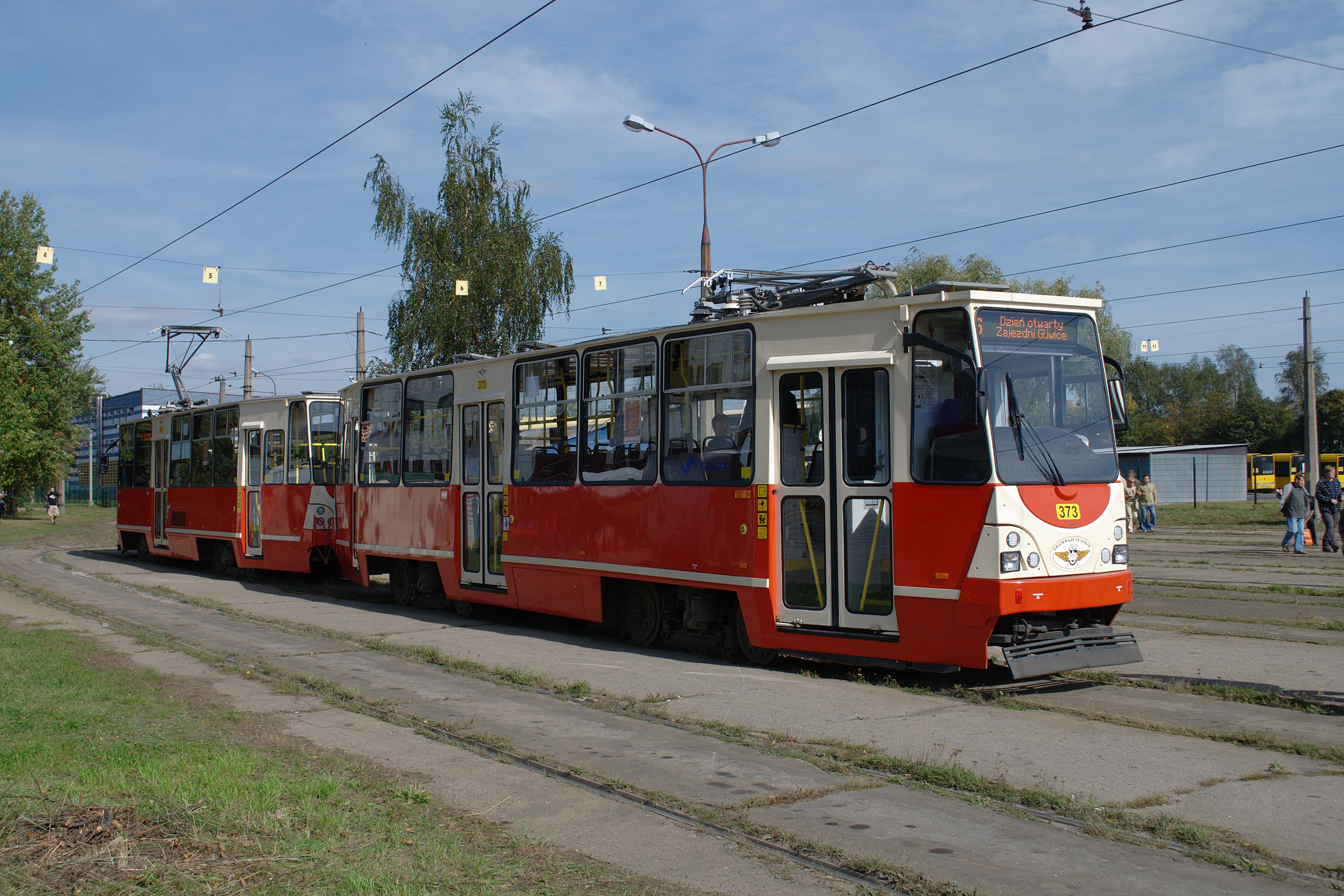
Konstal 111N

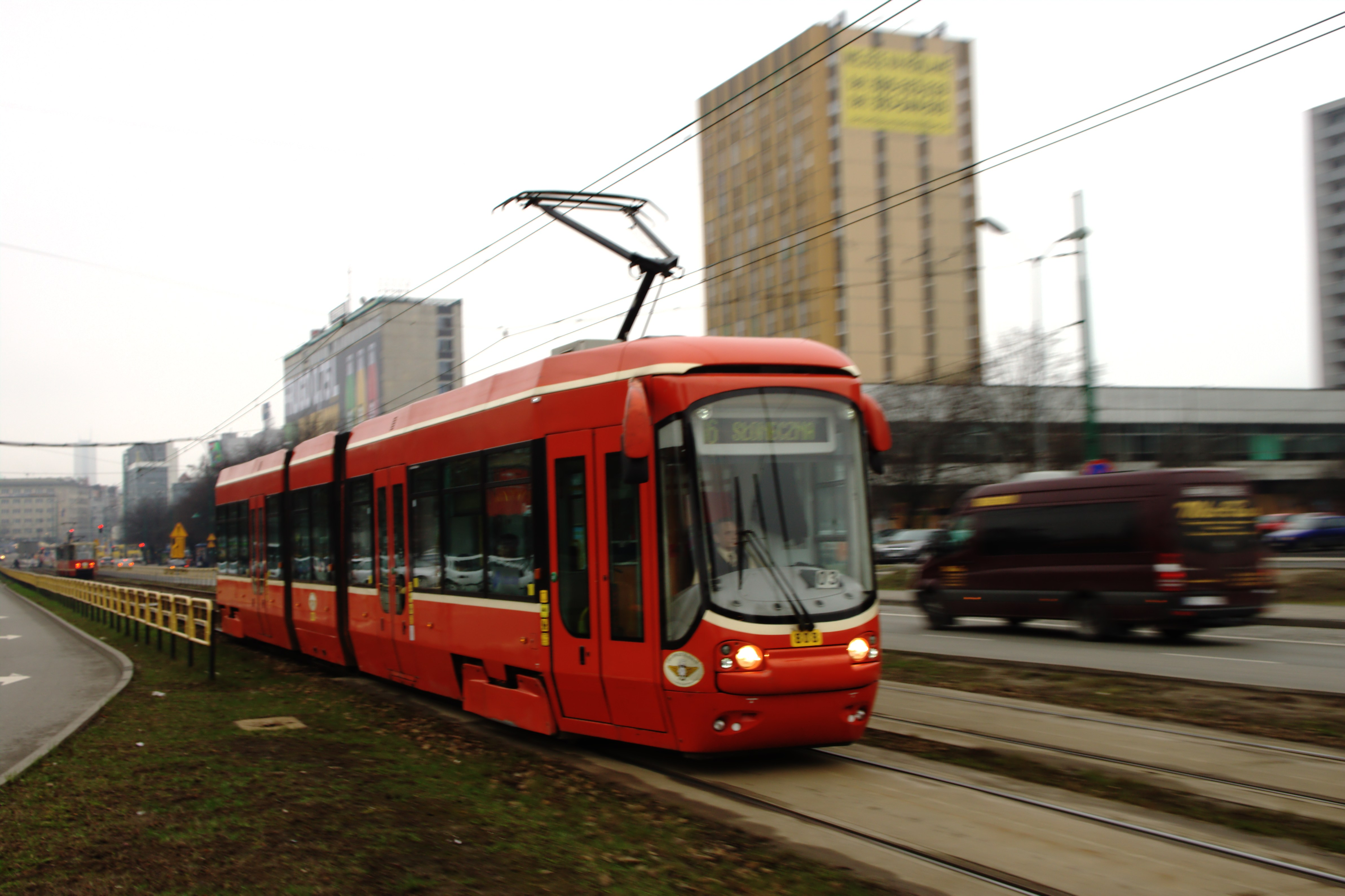
116Nd Citadis

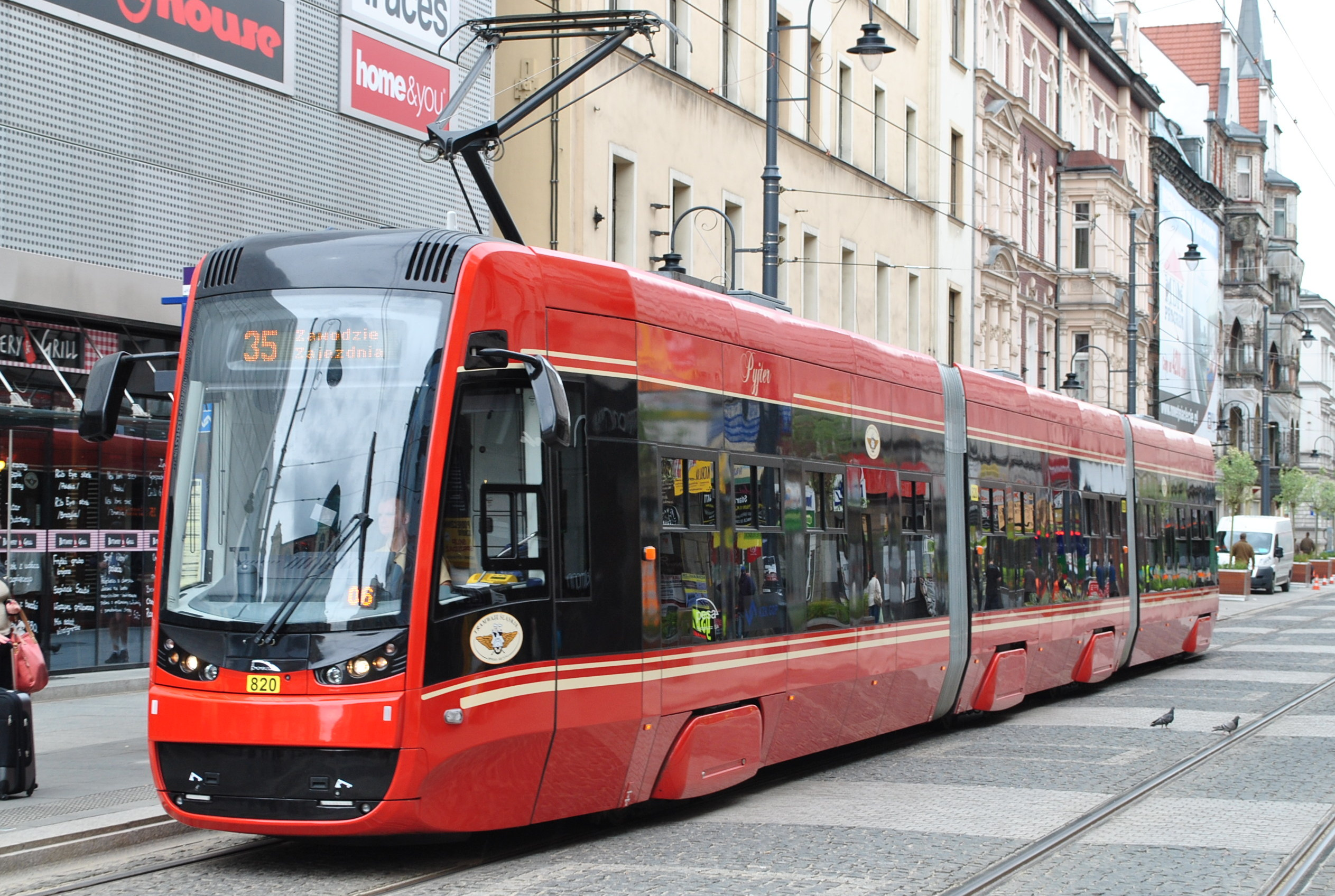
Pesa 2012N Twist

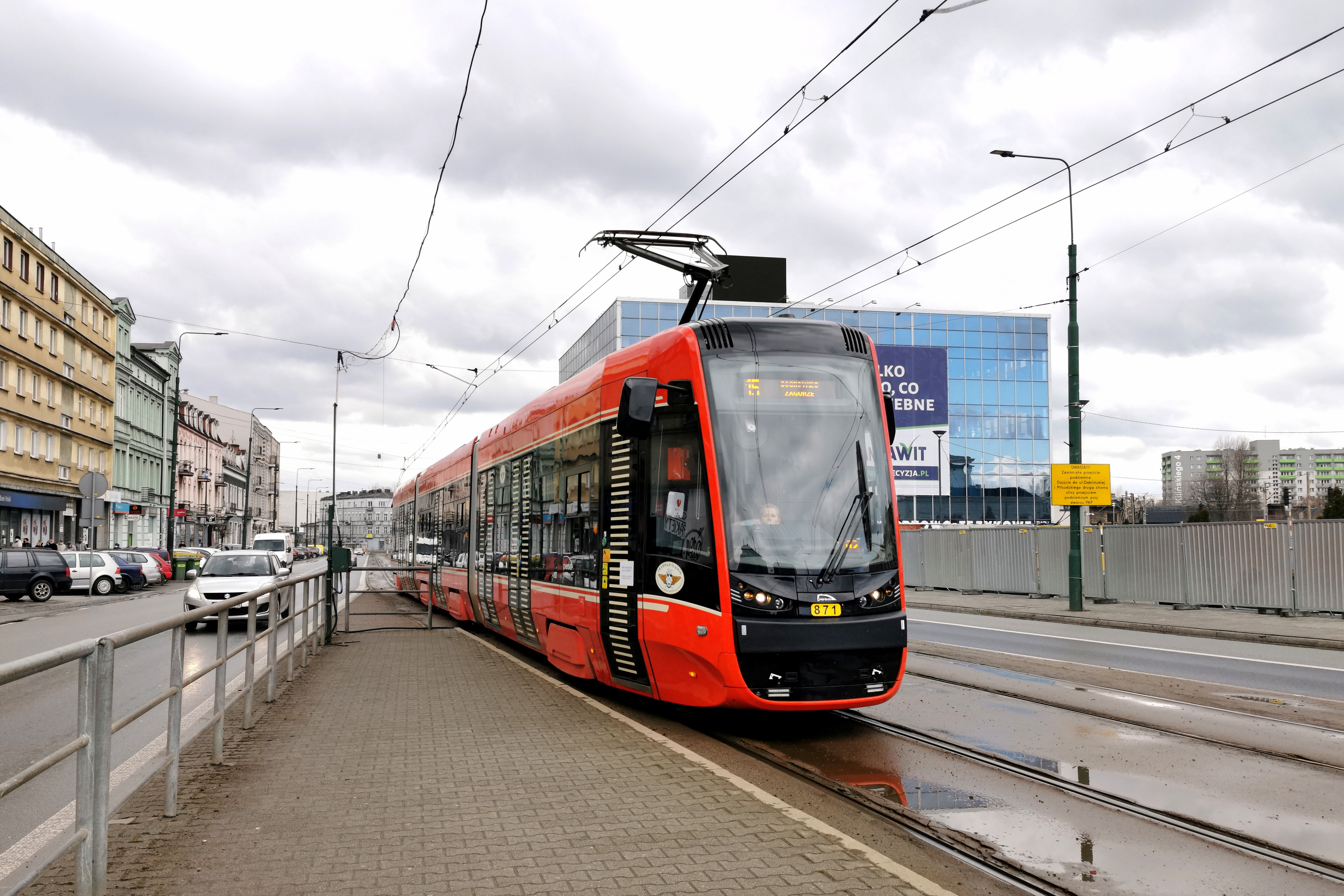
Pesa 2012N-10 Twist

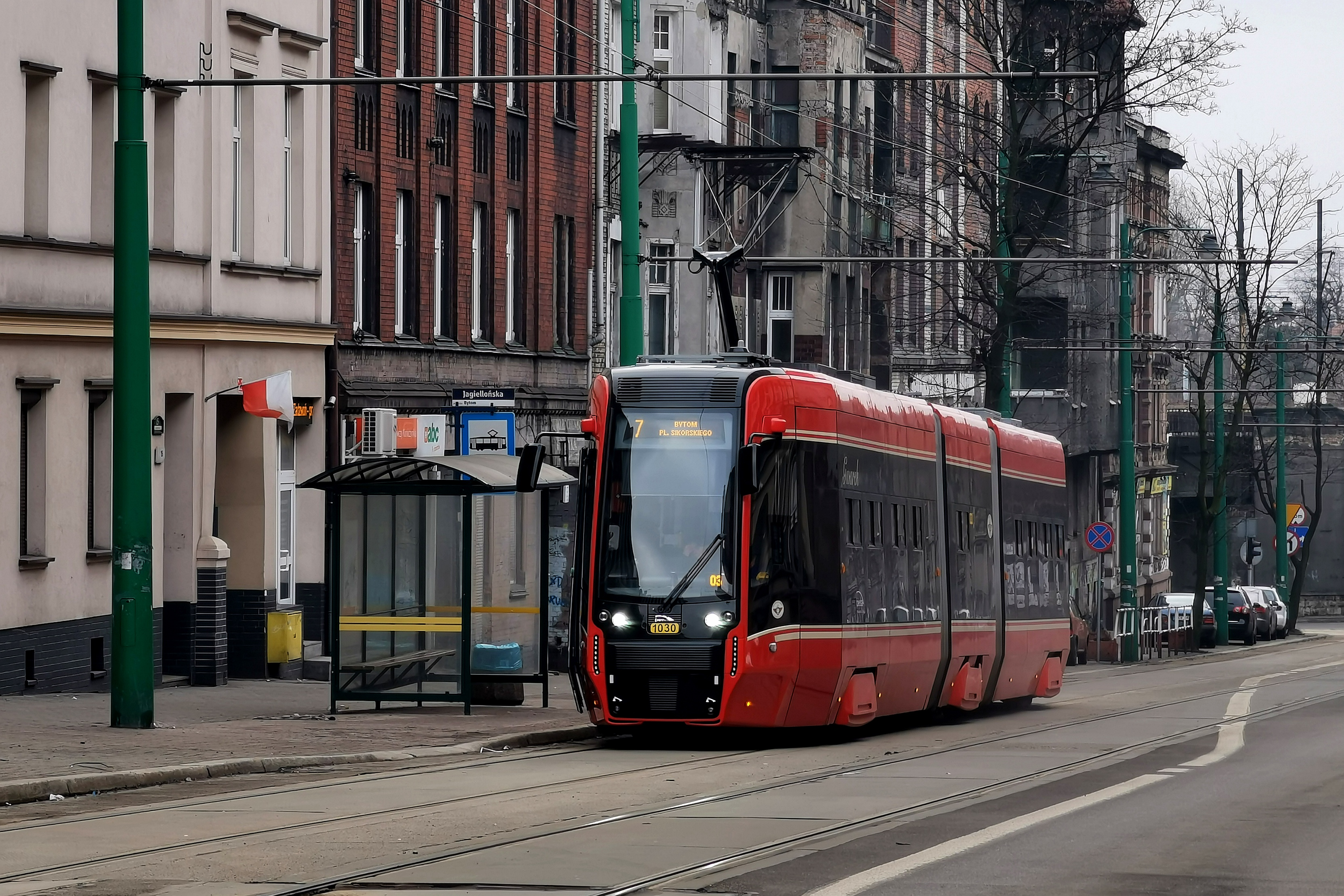
Pesa 2017N Twist

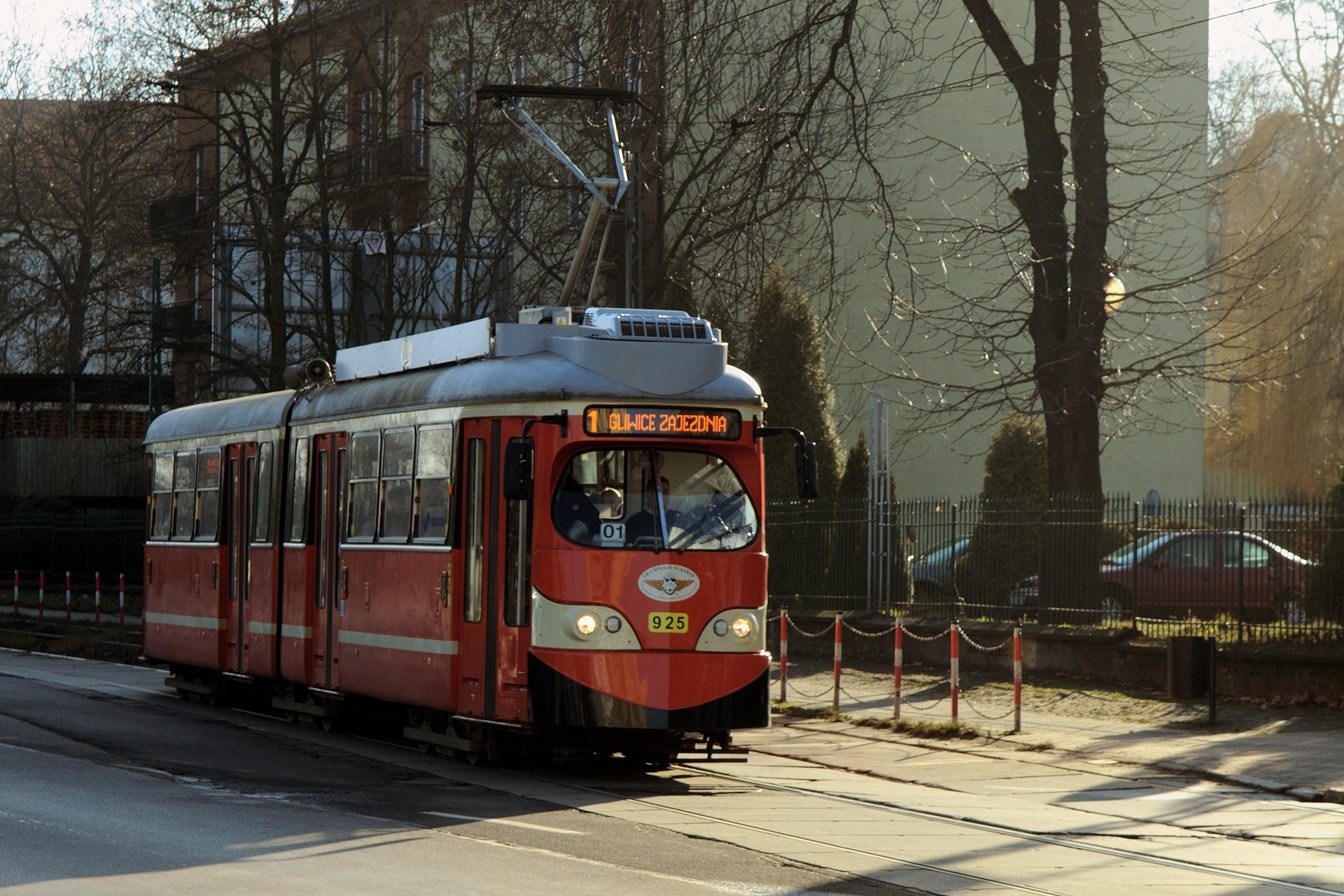
SGP/Lohner E1

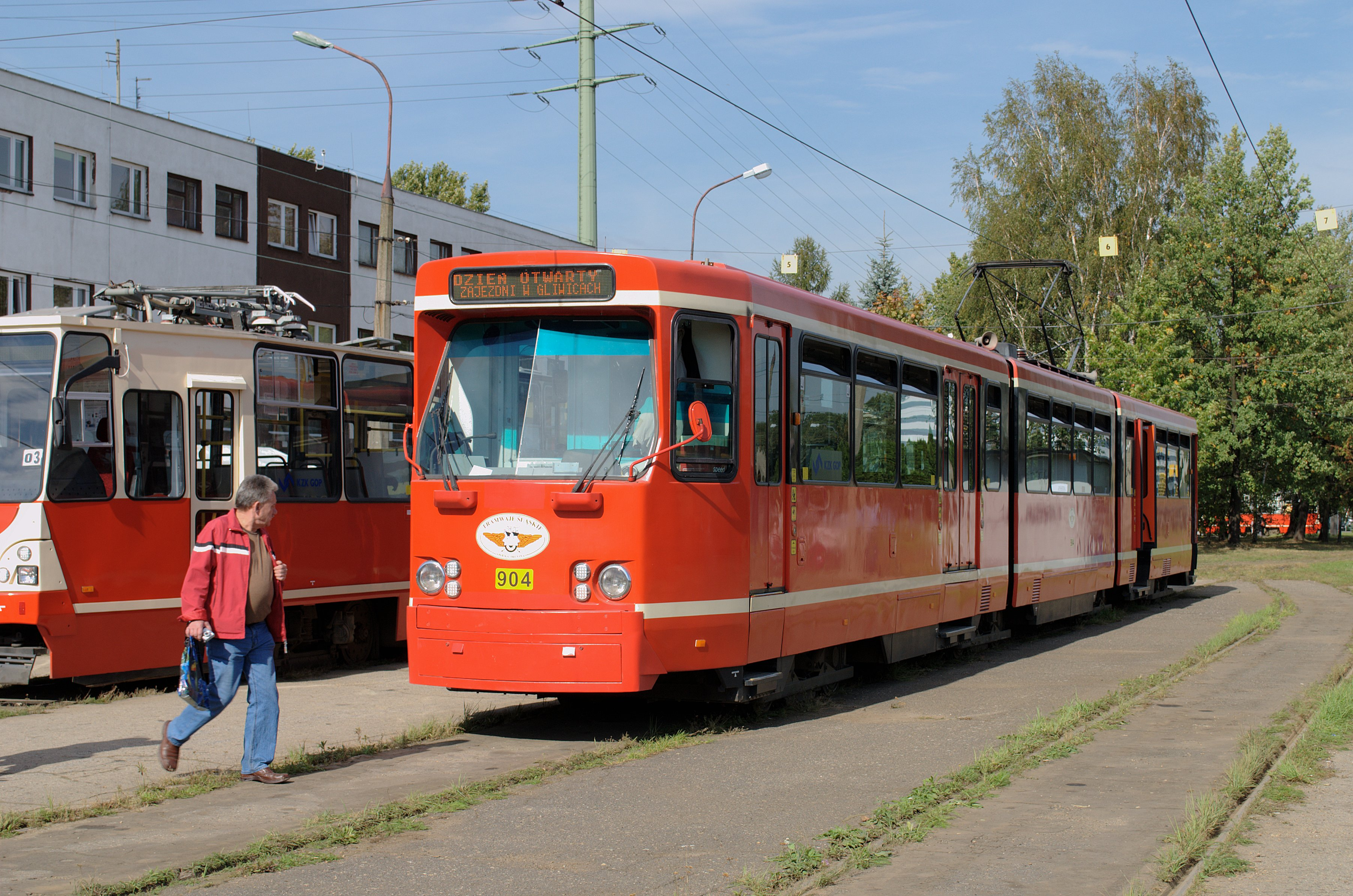
Düwag Pt8

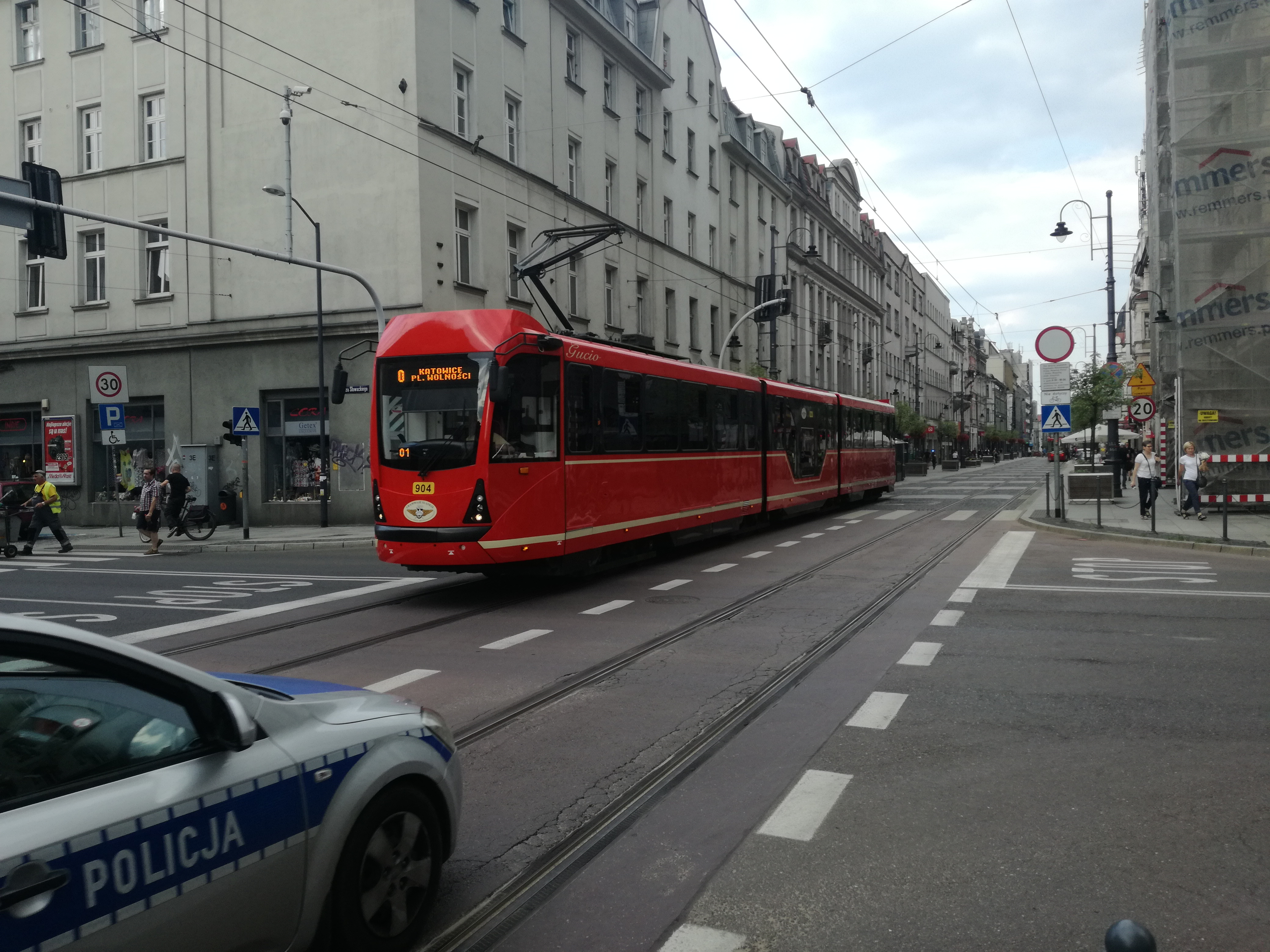
Düwag Ptm

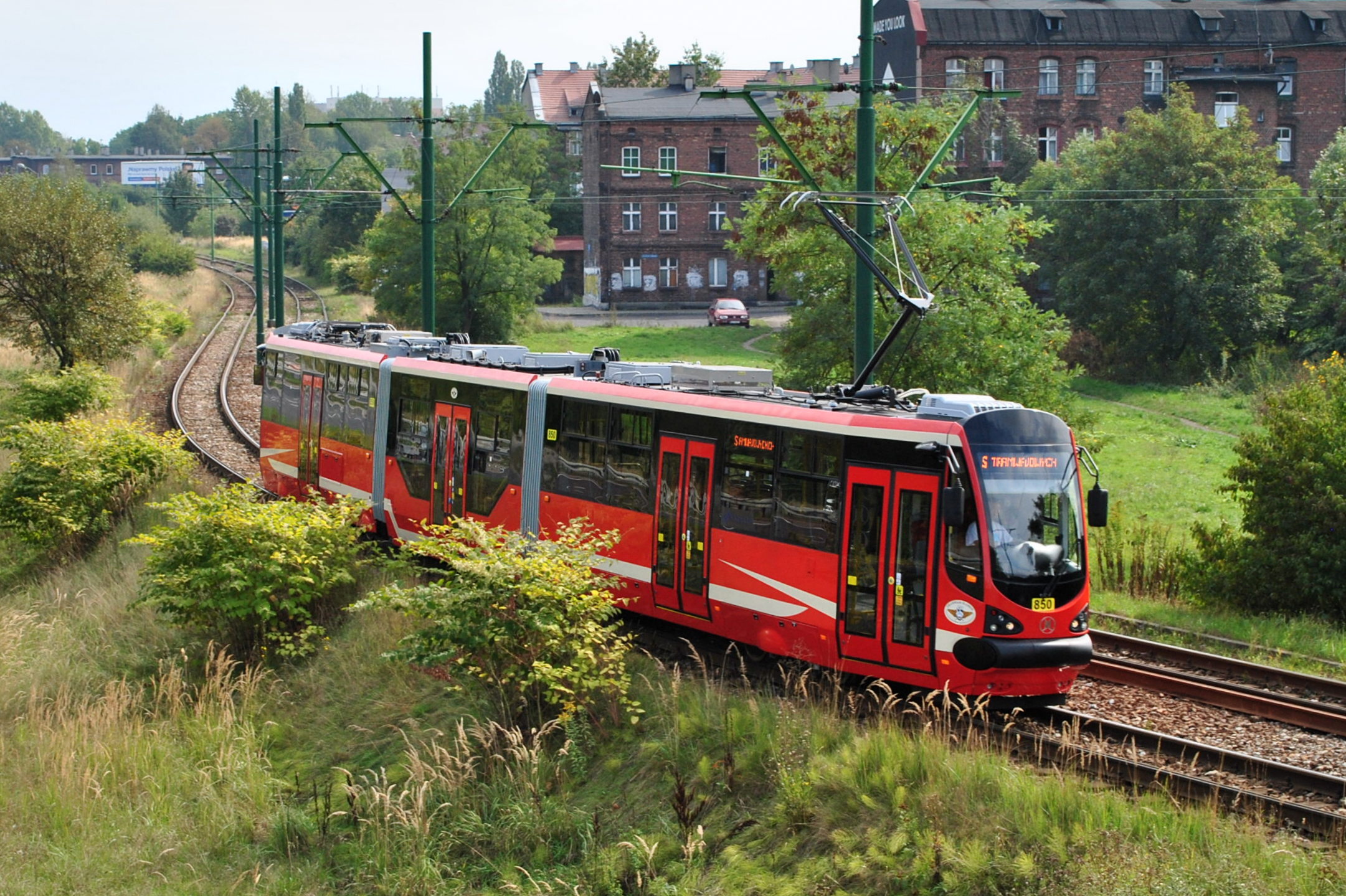
Moderus MF 16 AC BD Beta

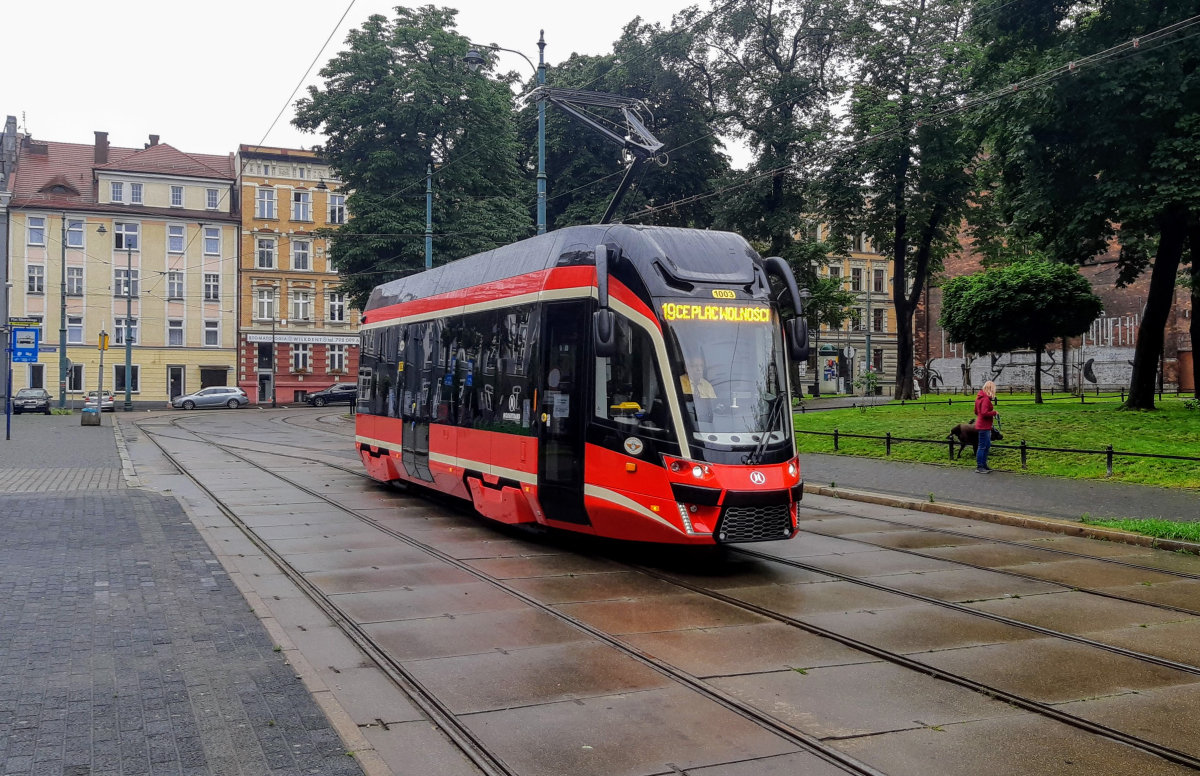
Moderus MF 10 AC Beta

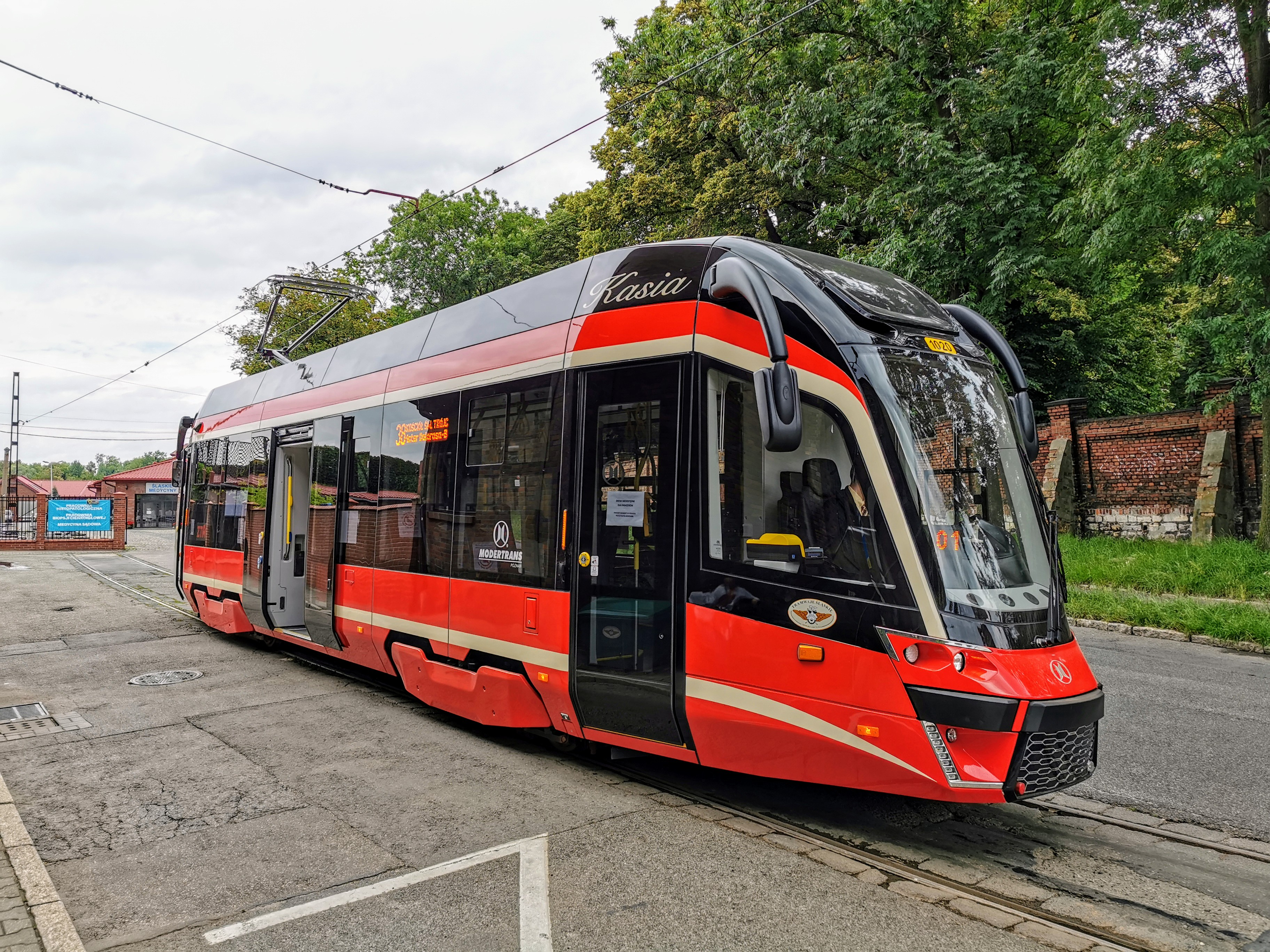
Moderus MF 11 AC BD Beta
