= Konstal N =

Polish tram

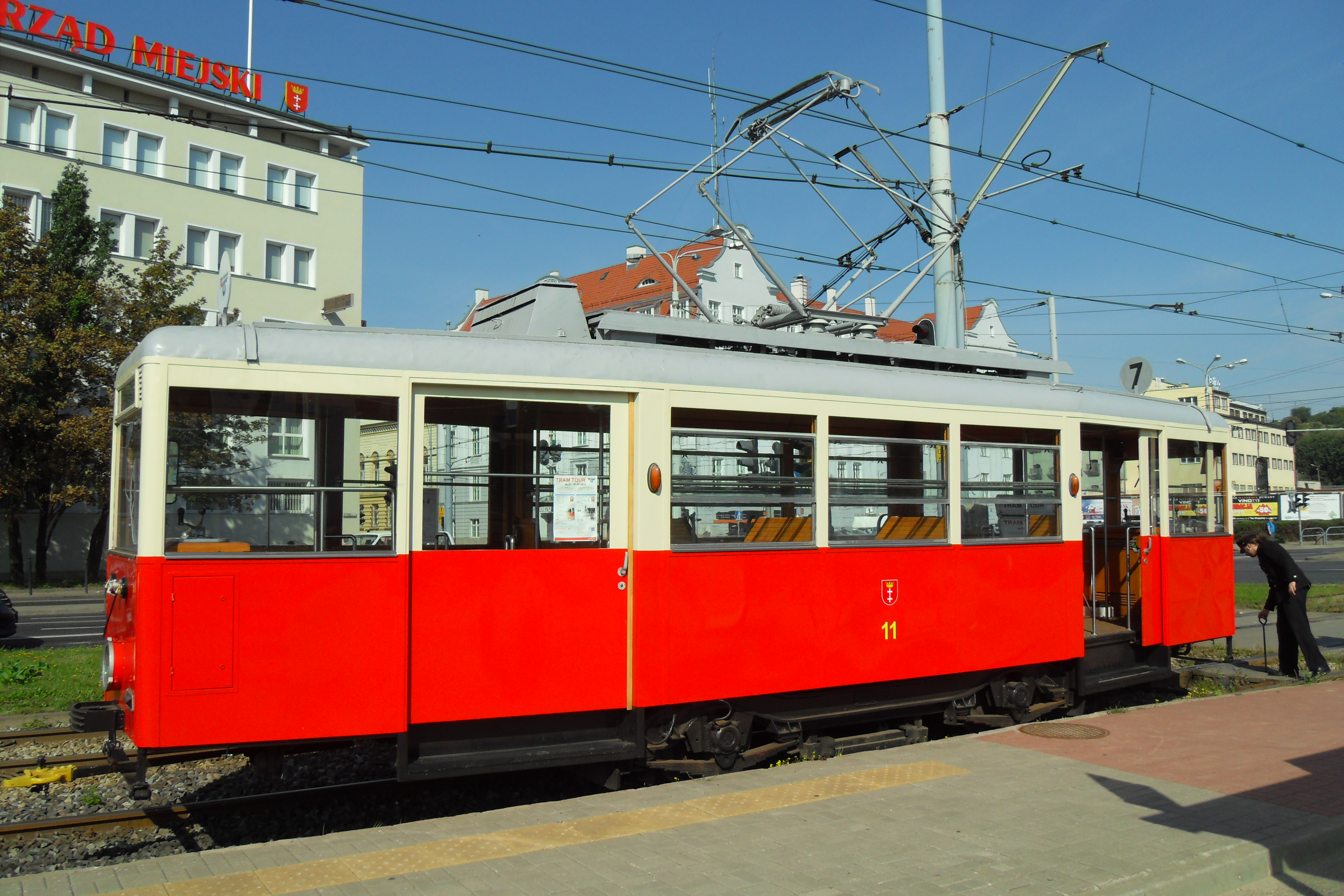
- Restored historic Konstal N tram in Gdańsk

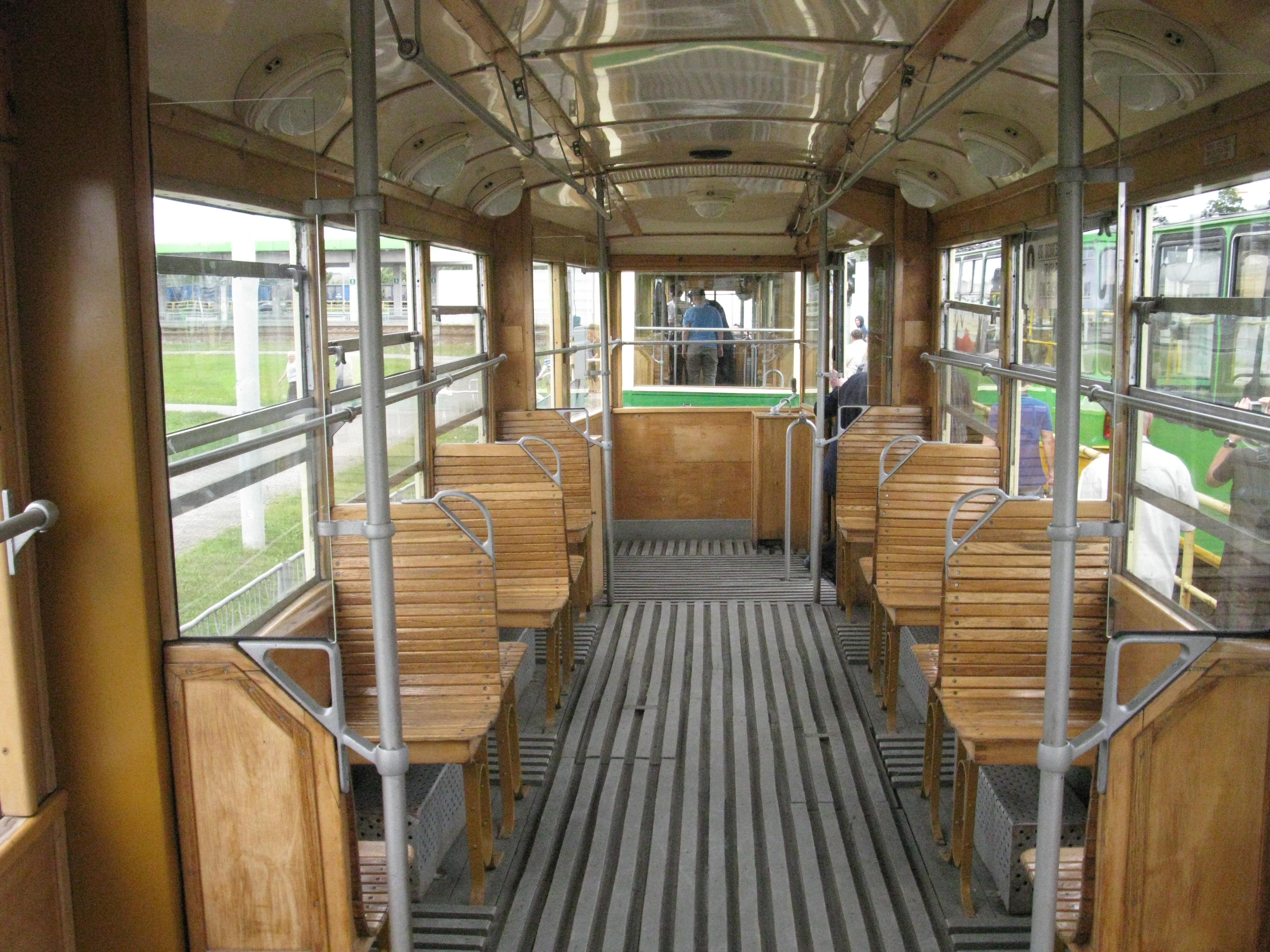
- Interior
- Manufacturer: Konstal; Stocznia Gdańska; Sanowag
- Assembly: (Poland) Gdańsk (Poland) Chorzów (Poland) Sanok
- Family name: Konstal
- Constructed: 1948 – 1956 (N); 1950 – 1956 (2N)
- Successor: Konstal 4N
- Capacity: 99

Specifications
- Car length: 10,400 mm (34 ft 1 in)
- Width: 2,160 mm (7 ft 1 in)
- Height: 3,300 mm (10 ft 10 in)
- Doors: 4
- Engine type: LT-31
- Traction motors: 2
- Power output: 2×60 kW
- Electric system(s): 600 V DC
- Current collector(s): pantograph
- Wheels driven: 1
- Coupling system: Albert
- Track gauge: 1,435 mm (4 ft 8 1/2 in), 1,000 mm (3 ft 3 3/8 in)

Konstal N was a tram model based on the German Kriegsstraßenbahnwagen concept, manufactured between 1948 and 1956 by the companies Konstal in Chorzów, Gdańsk Shipyard no. 3 and Sanok Railcar Factory "Sanowag". The narrow-gauge version (Konstal 2N) was built from 1950 to 1956. Trailers (tram units with no engine) were marked ND or 2ND. The N was the first tram manufactured in Poland after the Second World War.

== Specifications ==
The N was a bidirectional motor tramcar, equipped with four sliding doors.

In post-war Poland, many cities struggled with significant shortages of rolling stock, and therefore it was necessary to develop a tram with simple construction and easy assembly. It was decided to copy the construction of the German tram Kriegsstraßenbahnwagen (KSW), developed during the Second World War to satisfy the demand of local tram transport companies. Due to the lack of motors, initially the ND trailers for Upper Silesia were built.

The successor of Konstal N was Konstal 4N.

== Usage ==
The N standard-gauge trams were supplied to: Gdańsk, Gorzów Wielkopolski, Sopot, the Upper silesian conurbation, Kraków, Poznań, Szczecin, Warsaw, and Wrocław, while narrow-gauge versions were used, among others, in Bielsko-Biała, Bydgoszcz, Grudziądz, Elbląg, Inowrocław, Jelenia Góra, Legnica, Łódź, Olsztyn, Słupsk, Toruń and Wałbrzych.

To this day, two units are operated in Bytom, where they are used on a single-track tram line no. 38 during weekends, replacing one regular tram. These are trams no. 954 from 1949, and no. 1118 from 1951.

== Photo gallery ==
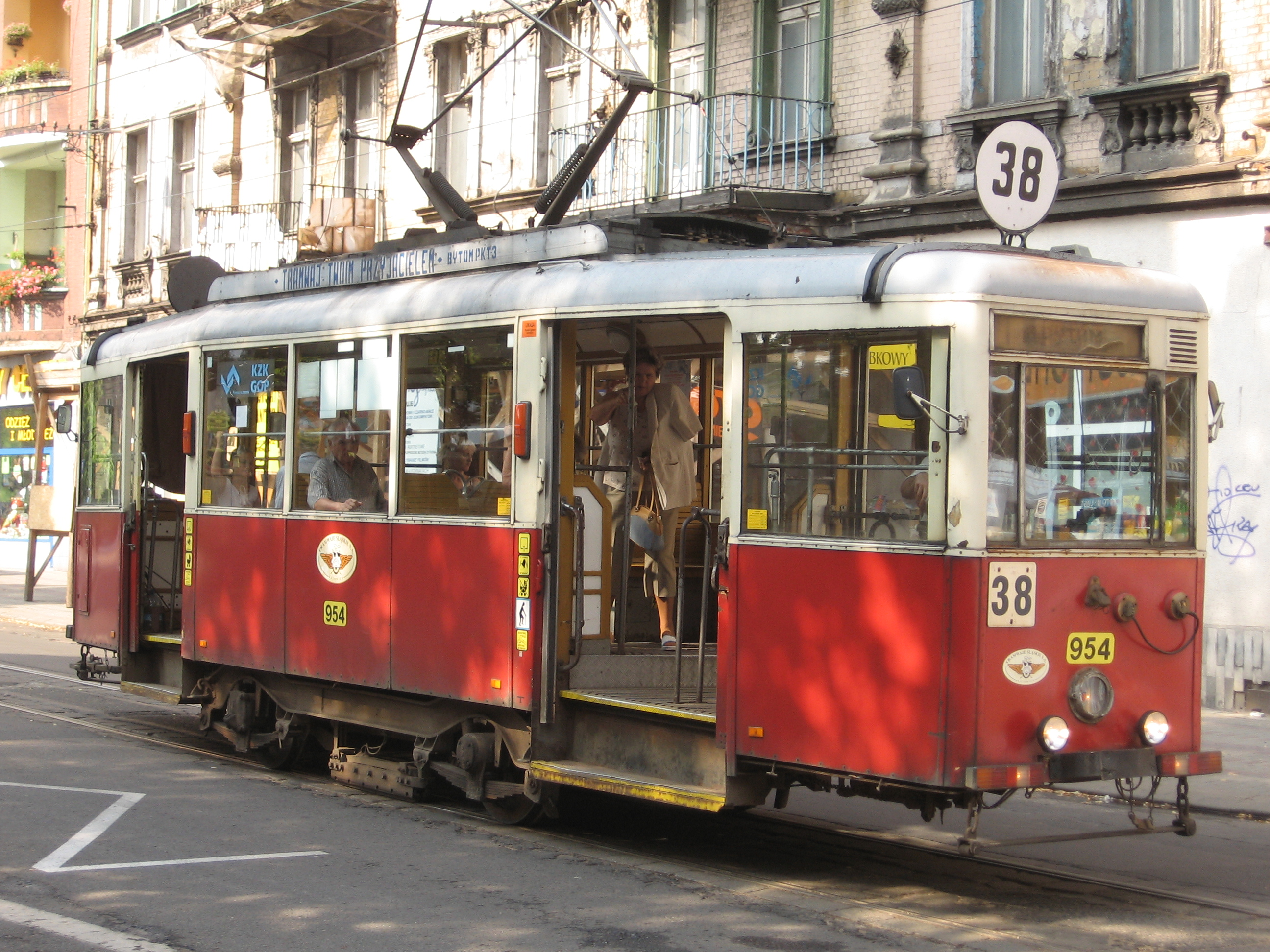
Konstal N in Bytom, still in service in 2006

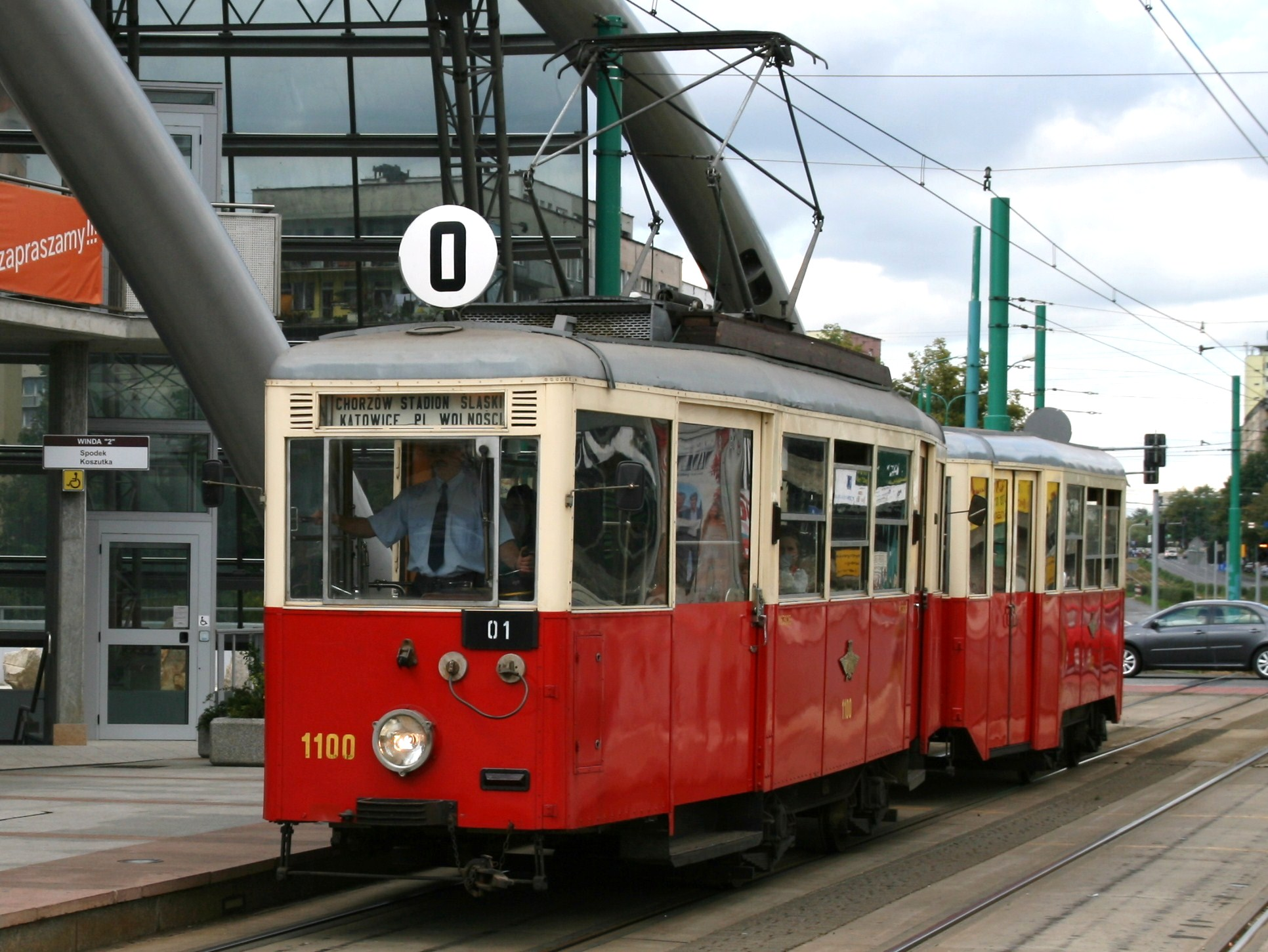
A historic N car with the 4ND1 trailer in tow in Katowice, 2008

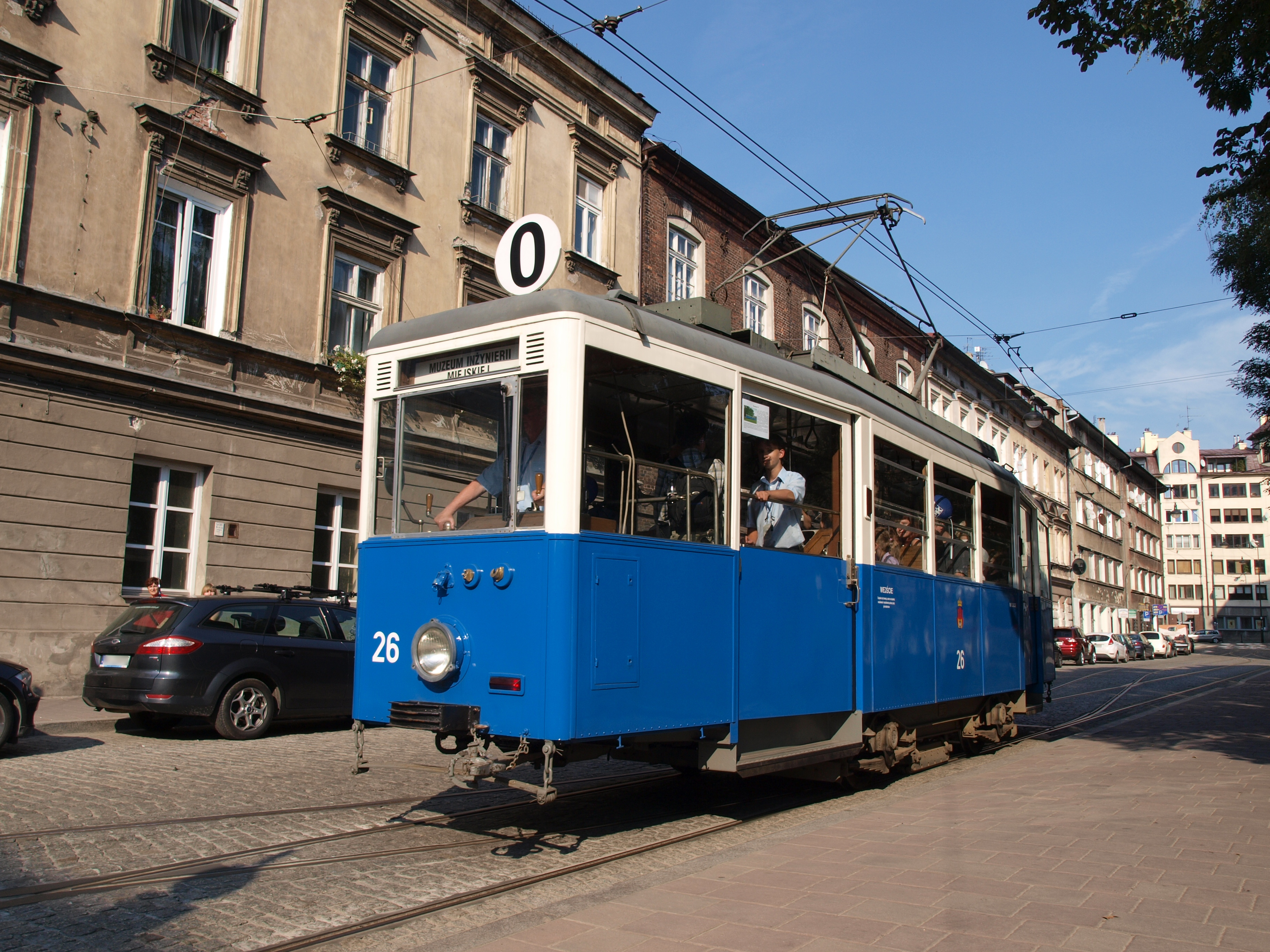
A historic N in Kraków, 2011

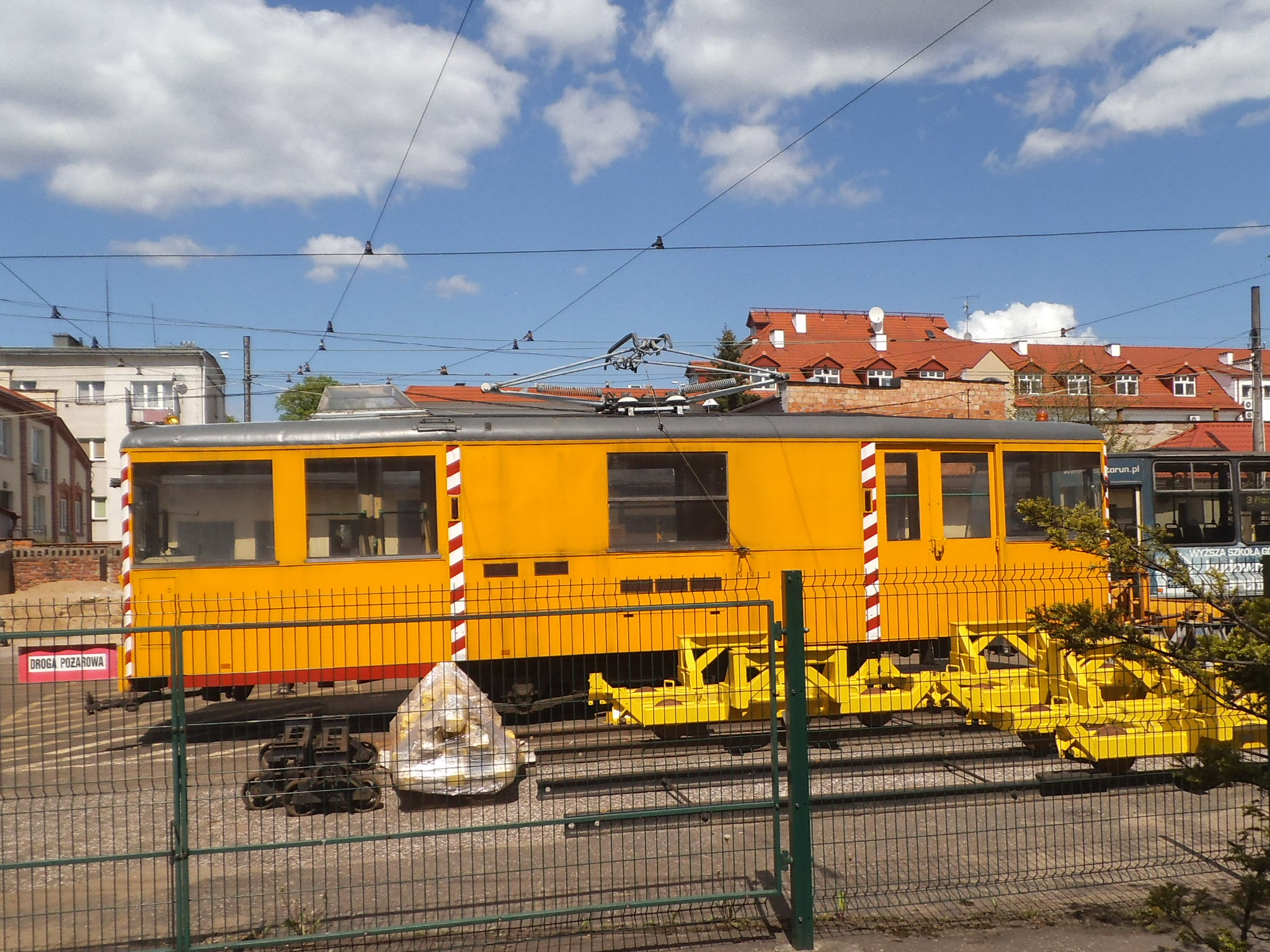
A type N car converted into a snowplow in Toruń

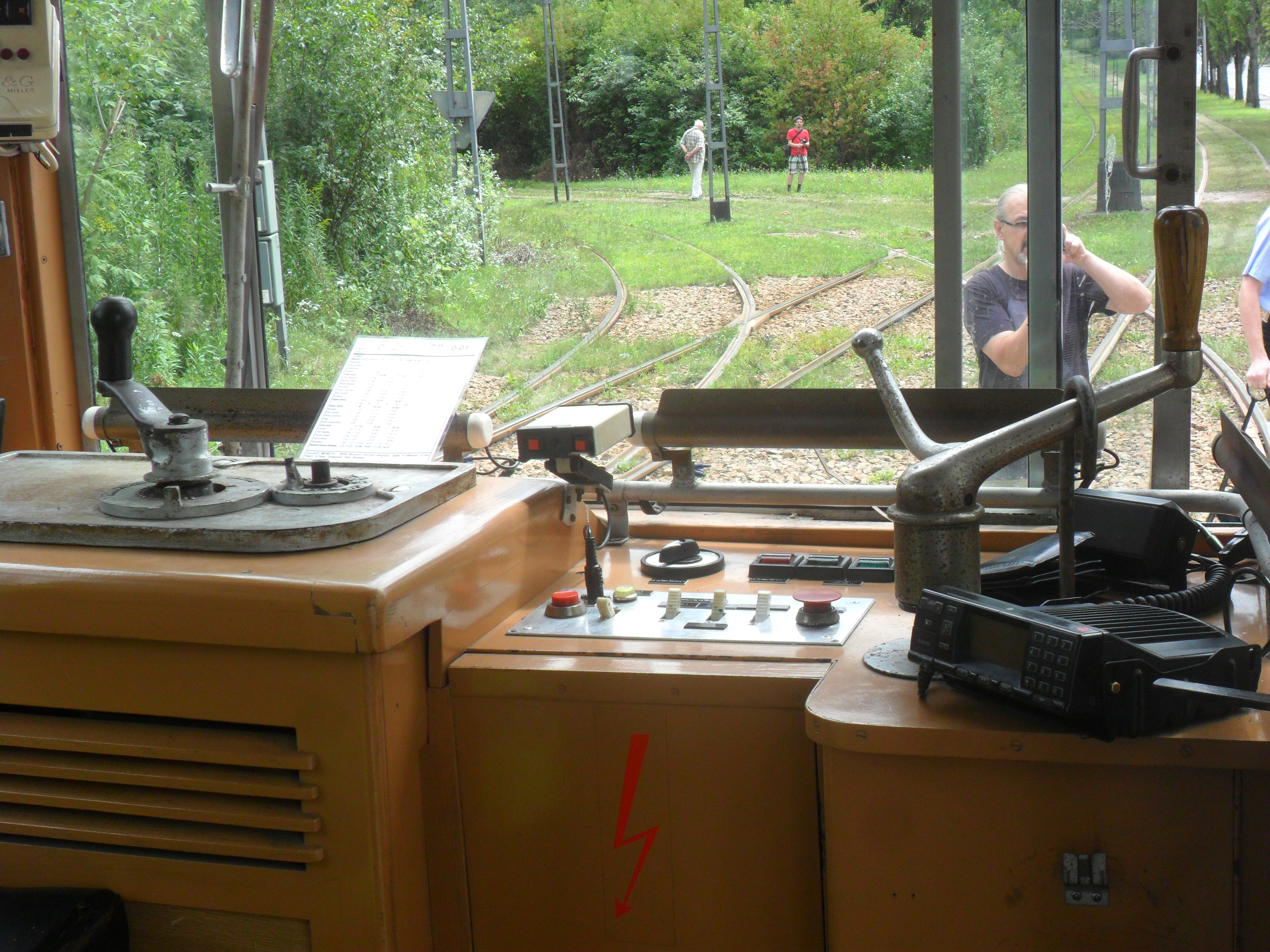
Dashboard
