= Trams in Gdańsk =

Tram system in Gdańsk, Poland

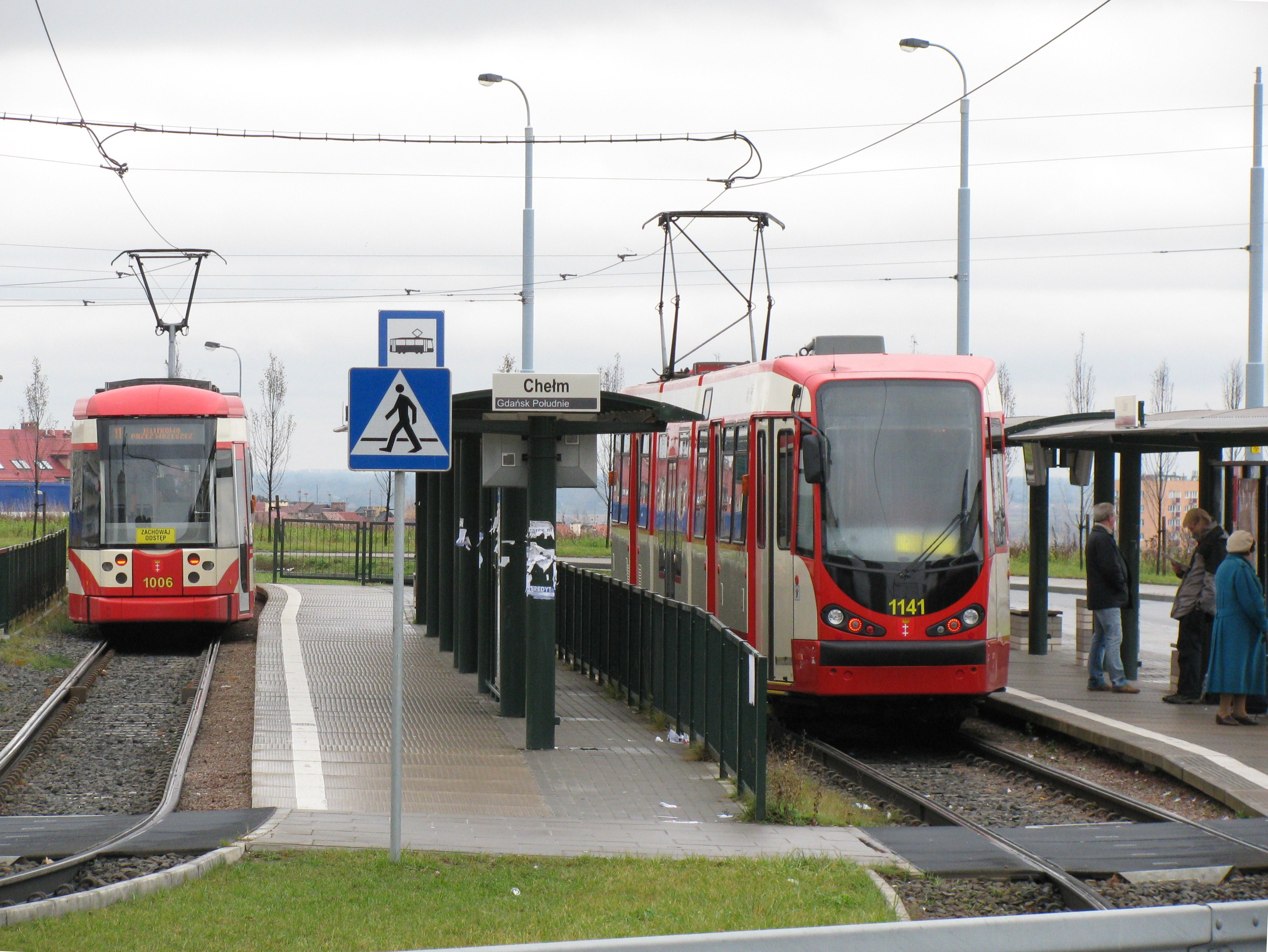

Operation
- Locale: Gdańsk, Poland
- Open: 1873
- Lines: 11
- Operator: Gdańskie Autobusy i Tramwaje

Infrastructure
- Track gauge: 1,435 mm (4 ft 8 1/2 in)
- Depots: Strzyża, Nowy Port
- Stock: 35x PESA Swing 120Na; 35x PESA Jazz DUO 128NG; 4x Alstom Citadis 100 NGd99; 3x Bombardier NGT6-2-Gd; 2x Konstal 114Na; 62x Düwag N8C; 1x Konstal 105N; 1x Konstal 102Na; 1x Tw269 Ring; 1x Konstal N 1x DWF Bergmann; 1x Grums horse car

Statistics
- Track length (total): 58.9 km (36.6 mi)
Overview
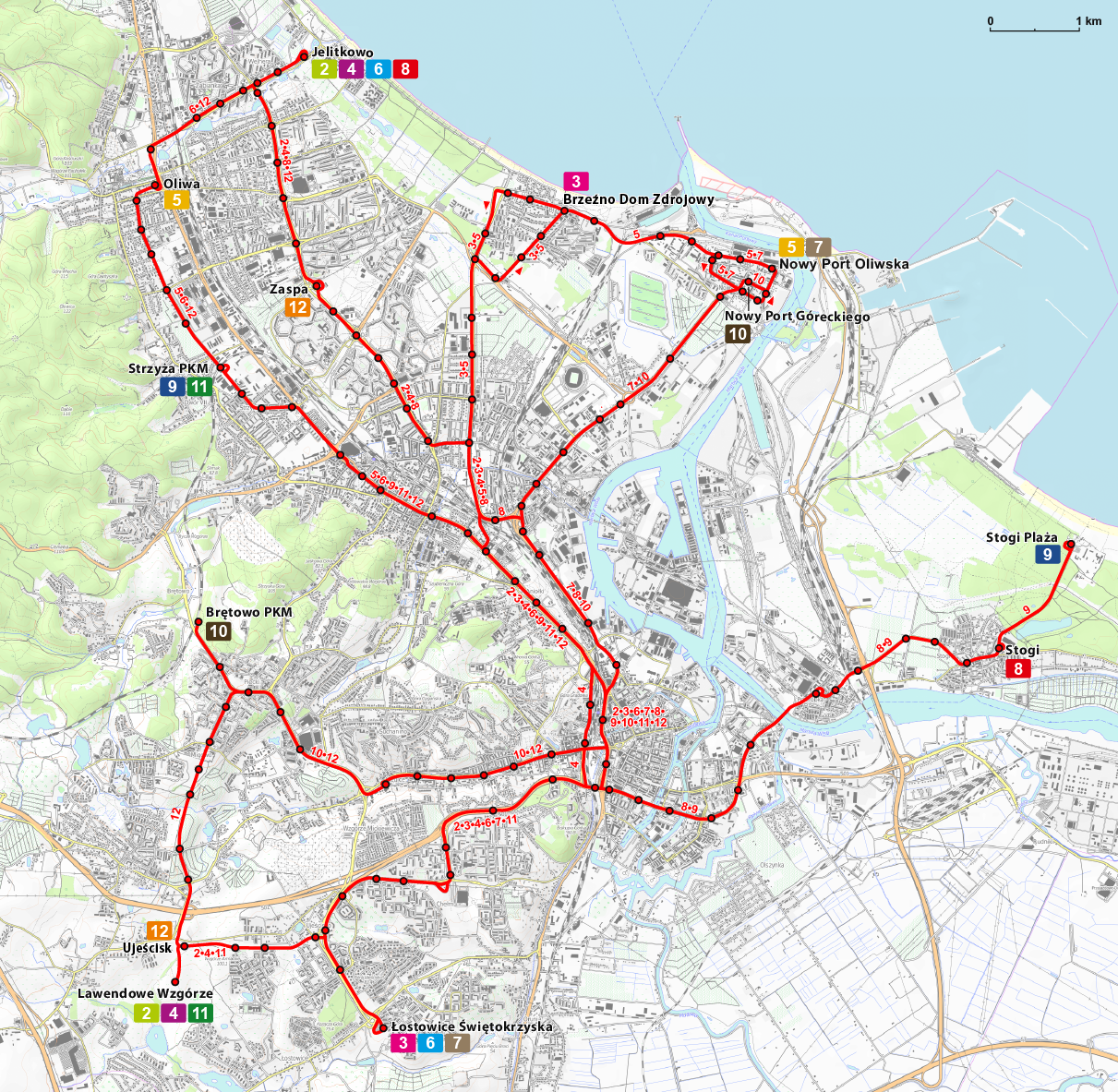
- Website: ztm.gda.pl ZTM Gdańsk

The Gdańsk tram system is a tram network in Gdańsk, Poland, that has been in operation since 1873. The tramway is operated by Gdańskie Autobusy i Tramwaje (GAiT), managed by Zarząd Transportu Miejskiego w Gdańsku (ZTM Gdańsk). There are 11 lines with a total route length of 58.9 kilometers (36.6 miles). The system operates on 1,435 mm (4 ft 8 1/2 in) standard gauge track. The trams are powered using direct current at 600 V.

== Network characteristics ==
The entire network is located within the administrative borders of the city of Gdańsk. The tracks are separated from road traffic along 85% of their length. Most of the network is double track. There are single track sections in the Brzeźno and Nowy Port districts, which function as balloon loops.

The tramway network primarily covers the Dolny Taras and Śródmieście areas and also links Wyspa Portowa and Siedlce. In 2007, the network was expanded to Chełm, and in 2012, it was expanded to Łostowice and Orunia Górna via Ujeścisko. In 2015, trams started running to Piecki-Migowo and Brętowo .

The majority of the lines are located on flat terrain; a notable exception is the line to Chełm which is the steepest tram line in Poland. Three tram loops (Jelitkowo, Brzeźno Plaża, and Stogi Plaża) and the Brzeźno terminus are located within a few hundred meters of Gdańsk Bay; consequently, these lines have a high level of tourist traffic.

The tracks run mainly through urbanized areas. An exception to this is the line to Stogi, which runs running through the Las Miejski (Polish for 'Urban woods'). The lines to Chełm have some characteristics of light rail.

The two depots for the trams are located on ulica Stwosza in Strzyży and by ulica Władysława IV in Nowy Port. The depots have a capacity equal to approximately 40% of all the trams.

== History ==
=== Horsecars ===
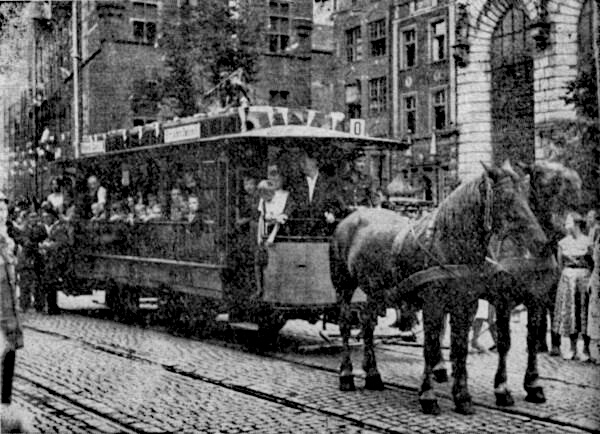
Danziger Pferdeeisenbahn

The first horsecar line was launched by the Berlin-founded company Deutsche Pferdeeisenbahn on 23 June 1873. It ran from Heumarkt (now Targ Sienny) through Langfuhr (now Wrzeszcz) to Oliva, where the first tram depot was built. After a year, the line between Langfuhr and Oliva was suspended due to competition from rail transport.

After acquiring the company Otto Braunschweig und Oskar Kupferschmidt in 1877, the tramway network was expanded:

- from Centrum to Ohra (now Orunia) in 1878;
- from Kohlenmarkt (now Targ Węglowy), through Langgasse (ulica Długa), Langer Markt (Długi Targ), and Langgarten (now Długie Ogrody) to Langgarter Tor (now Brama Żuławska) and Niederstadt (now Dolne Miasto) in 1883;
- from the train station Danzig Petershagen by present-day ulica Toruńska, through Rechtsstadt (now Główne Miasto) to Fischmarkt (now Targ Rybny) in 1886;
- from Centrum to Schidlitz (now Siedlce) in 1886.

During this time, the following tram depots were in operation:

- Langfuhr near Mirchauer Weg;
- Weidengasse in Niederstadt;
- Ohra and Schidlitz, which were wooden buildings.

=== Introduction of electric trams ===
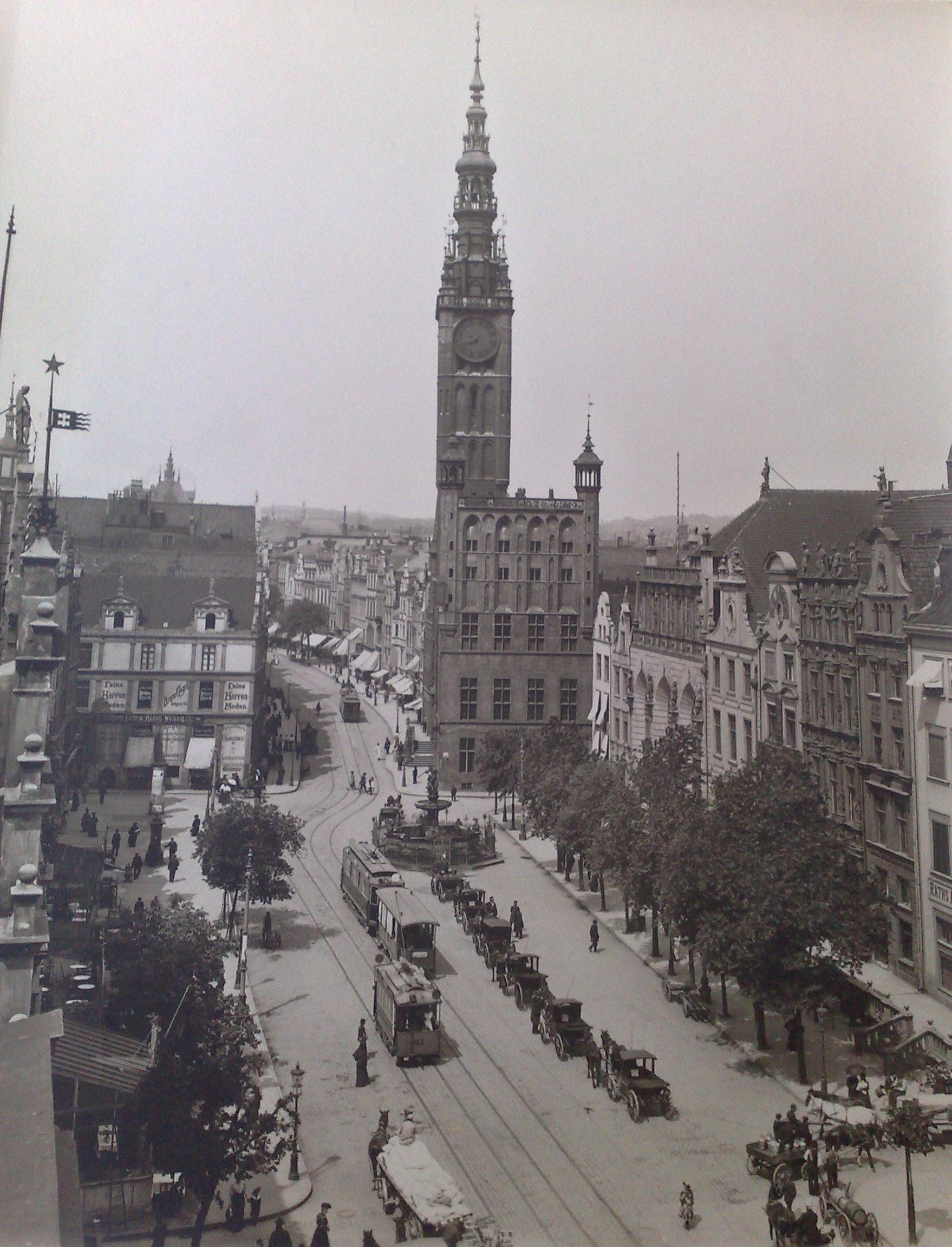
Trams on Danzig's Langer Markt (1906)

In 1894, the Berlin-founded company AEG acquired Danziger Strassen Eisenbahn. The company then decided to electrify the tramway network. The first regular electric trams were launched on 12 August 1896 on the lines to Orhra and Schidlitz. The first electric tram to Langfuhr was delayed until 28 August due to problems with infrastructure. All horsecar lines were electrified by the end of the year, and the network was expanded to link the new main station with Kohlenmarkt. Also at this time, the line from Fischmarkt was expanded to Stadtgraben (now Podwale Grodzkie). After all tracks were electrified, AEG transferred the tramway network administration to Allgemeine Strassen und Eisenbahn Gesellschaft.

In 1899 in Neufahrwasser (now Nowy Port), a new tramway company was created called Danziger Elektrische Strassenbahn. In 1900, it opened two lines from Langfuhr to Brösen (now Brzeźno) and from Brösen through Neufagrwasser to Schichau shipyard. The line towards the city center was later expanded to Kassubischer Markt, and subsequently through Pfefferstadt to ulica Szeroka up to the Żuraw. This company had a tram depot near Fischmeisterweg. In 1903, the two tramway companies merged to form Danziger Elektrische Strassenbahn A.G., headquartered in Langfuhr. In 1904, tracks were built on the Irrgartenbrücke (Błędnik viaduct), linking the tracks on Grosse Allee (Wielka Aleja) with the tracks on Stadtgraben (Podwale Grodzkie). On 18 July 1908, the line from Am Markt (Oliva, now Stary Rynek Oliwski) through ulica Pomorska to Glettkau (Jelitkowo) was opened.

=== Trams during World War I ===
On 1 May 1914, the lines were numbered, replacing the signs marking the terminuses. In February 1917, a lack of coal and spare parts began to cause failures and derailments. In January 1918, several lines were suspended.

=== Trams in the Free City of Danzig ===
Towards the end of 1919, the suspended lines began to be reinstated, and the numbering of some lines was changed. Lines from Promenade were redirected to Stadtgraben, after which the lines to Promenade were scrapped. In 1925, the construction of a line from Centrum to Heubude (now Stogi) began; it was opened on 4 July 1927. In 1926, tracks on the newly established Paul-Beneke-Weg were opened, scrapping the single rail along Harbour Quay. At the same time in Neufahrwasser, two balloon loops were constructed. There was a small loop for the line from Centrum and a larger loop for the line from Brösen.

In 1930, a new line from Grosse Allee across Aleja Hallera and ulica Mickiewicza opened to the loop at the intersection of aleja Legionów and ulica Kościuszki. On the line between Langfuhr and Oliva, the layout was changed, eliminating the line on ulica Szymanowskiego and replacing it with a line on aleja Wojska Polskiego. Construction also began for a new tram depot in Langfuhr. In 1934, pantographs were installed, except on the lines to Schidlitz and Ohra. Plans to extend the network to Bürgerwiesen (Rudnik) were scrapped. In 1935, a new tram depot by ulica Stworsza was built, and the tram depot near Mirchauer Weg was converted into a bus depot.

In 1942, the tram line from Centrum to Schidlitz was planned to be replaced with trolleybus lines. These plans were never realized. The tramway network functioned normally until 24 March 1945. As a result of shelling from the Soviet army, the power houses on Ołowianka were unable to supply adequate power, causing some trams to stop on the streets. During street battles, the tramcars were used as barricades.

=== Renovation after 1945 ===
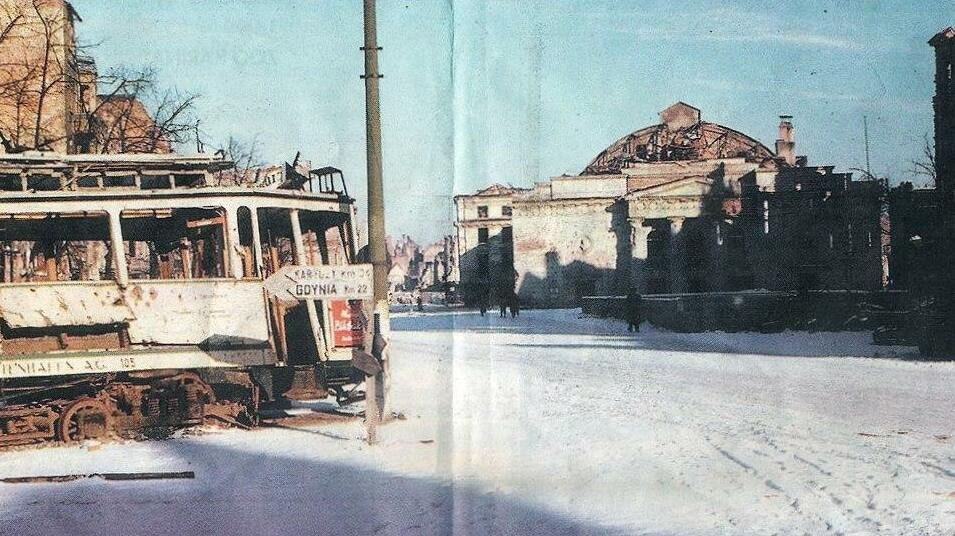
Remains of a tram (1946)

By the end of the Second World War, the tramway power systems were destroyed, the tracks were seriously damaged from artillery fire, and no tramcars remained usable. Immediately after the end of military activities in April 1945, efforts begain to rebuild the tramway infrastructure. The local management board formed the Miejski Zakład Komunikacyjny w Gdańsku. Teams of tramway workers from Poznań, Warsaw, and Łódź worked with the tramway workers from Gdańsk to secure and inventory the salvageable materials. Trams and their components were taken from the depot in Wrzeszcz, which had remained largely intact. By contrast, the tram depot by ulica Łąkowa had lost its roof from both halls as well as the workshop.

On 28 June 1945, rebuilding work for the tramway network recommenced. The repairs were completed in 1947. Almost all lines in existence before the war were rebuilt. The exceptions were tracks were on ulica Szeroka, ulica Kowalska, and ulica Korzenna, as well as a technical track on Stare Przedmieście, which were not restored. A new line to Sopot was launched in 1946.

=== 1947–1989 ===
After the war, tracks located in the densely built city center were eliminated in accordance with the ideology that trams should only run along major thoroughfares. As a result of the construction of National road 1, new wide streets with tram tracks were built.

In 1948 in Oliwa, a new loop was opened near the intersection of aleja Grunwaldzka and ulica Rybińskiego, replacing the need for the loop on Stary Rynek Oliwski. On 1 January 1951, a new company was founded named Wojewódzkie Przedsiębiorstwo Komunikacyjne Gdańsk-Gdynia (WPK G-G).

In 1955, a nightly tramway service was launched. In 1957, the line to Siedlce along ulica Świerczewskiego was made double track. The loop on ulica Bogusławskiego was eliminated, with trams from Orunia uisng the loop on Targ Węglowy instead. A new line was established from ulica Mickiewicza through aleja Marksa to the loop near ulica Kolonia Uroda.

In 1960, the track from Kolonia Uroda was extended to Brzeźno, simultaneously eliminating the tracks on ulica Chrobrego and Waryńskiego. The tram terminating on ulica Waryńskiego was directed to the loop near the airport. In 1961, the line to Sopot was eliminated due to competition from train operator Szybka Koleja Miejska. In the early 1960s, the loop by ulica Szymanowskiego was eliminated, replaced by a new loop by ulica Abrahama. In 1968, service recommenced along ulica 3 Maja after 42 years without service, and construction began of the Błędnik viaduct, which was opened for service on 22 July 1970.

In the early 1970s, the entire track to Siedlce was made double track. On 28 July 1971, the loop by ulica Doka was opened for service, removing the need for the loop on Targ Węglowy. The tracks on ulica Pomorska were doubled, and the line to Orunia was closed.

In 1974, WPK G-G was renamed to Wojewódzkie Przedsiębiorstwo Komunikacyjne w Gdańsku (WPK). In 1974, after the airport in Rębiechowo was opened, construction began for a new line from the loop by ulica Kościuszki to ulica Pomorska in Jelitkowo, during which a large loop was constructed in the Zaspa district. The line was opened on 31 December 1977. On 22 July 1980, new tracks along ulica Kliniczna were opened.

In 1980, a project was launched to expand the tramway network to new neighborhoods on Górski Taras. As part of this, it was necessary to build a line to Chełm. Despite only being 2,900 meters long, the line would cross particularly hilly terrain. For technical reasons, and later financial reasons, the project was put off multiple times, with the line not being built until 29 years later.

On 17 December 1981, operations began on the tracks linking aleja Armii Krajowej and ulica 3 Maja, as well as on a new viaduct over railway tracks. A loop on ulica Kliniczna was opened, which allowed the loop on ulica Doka to be eliminated.

=== 1989–2012 ===
In 1989, the company WPK was split. The company established for Gdańsk was Przedsiębiorstwo Komunikacji Miejskiej, which became Gdańsk's budget committee in 1991 under the name of Zakład Komunikacji Miejskiej w Gdańsku (Gdańsk ZKM). In the early 1990s, a new section on Podwale Przedmiejskie was opened between ulica Chmielna and ulica Łąkowa, in addition to a new bridge for road traffic. This allowed for the elimination of the temporary bridge over the Nowa Motława. This line was expanded in 1995 to ulica Siennicka, which allowed the elimination of the line along Długie Ogrody.

In 1997, the Gdańsk ZKM bought two prototype Konstal 114Na vehicles, which featured 15% lower floors. Also in 1997, the proposal to expand the tramway network to Chełm was revived and studied. The studies concluded that the trams of the time were inadequate for the terrain of the projected line. The most serious problem was that the electromagnetic brakes would be unable to keep the trams stationary in the event of an electrical emergency.

In 1999, the tram depot near ulica Łąkowa in Dolne Miasto was repurposed into a car park. Also in this year, the Gdańsk ZKM ordered four Alstom-Konstal Citadis 100 trams, which featured 70% lower floors. These trams were allocated to line 2 (Centrum-Opera-Zaspa-Jelitkowo).

In 2004, the Gdańsk ZKM was converted from a budget committee to a limited liability company. In the same year, ulica Łąkowa was cut off from the tramway network and a modernization project of the tramway network called Gdański Projekt Komunikacji Miejskiej was launched. As a result of the modernization project, construction of the line to Chełm began along aleja Armii Krajowej and aleja Sikorskiego. On 19 December 2007, the line was opened for service. Because the grade of this line was up to 5%, the Konstal 105Na and Konstal 114Na trams could not be used for this line. Three Bombardier NGT6 trams were ordered to serve the line. As the condition of the Konstal 105Na trams was worsening, the Gdańsk ZKM also purchased 46 used N8C trams from Dortmund.

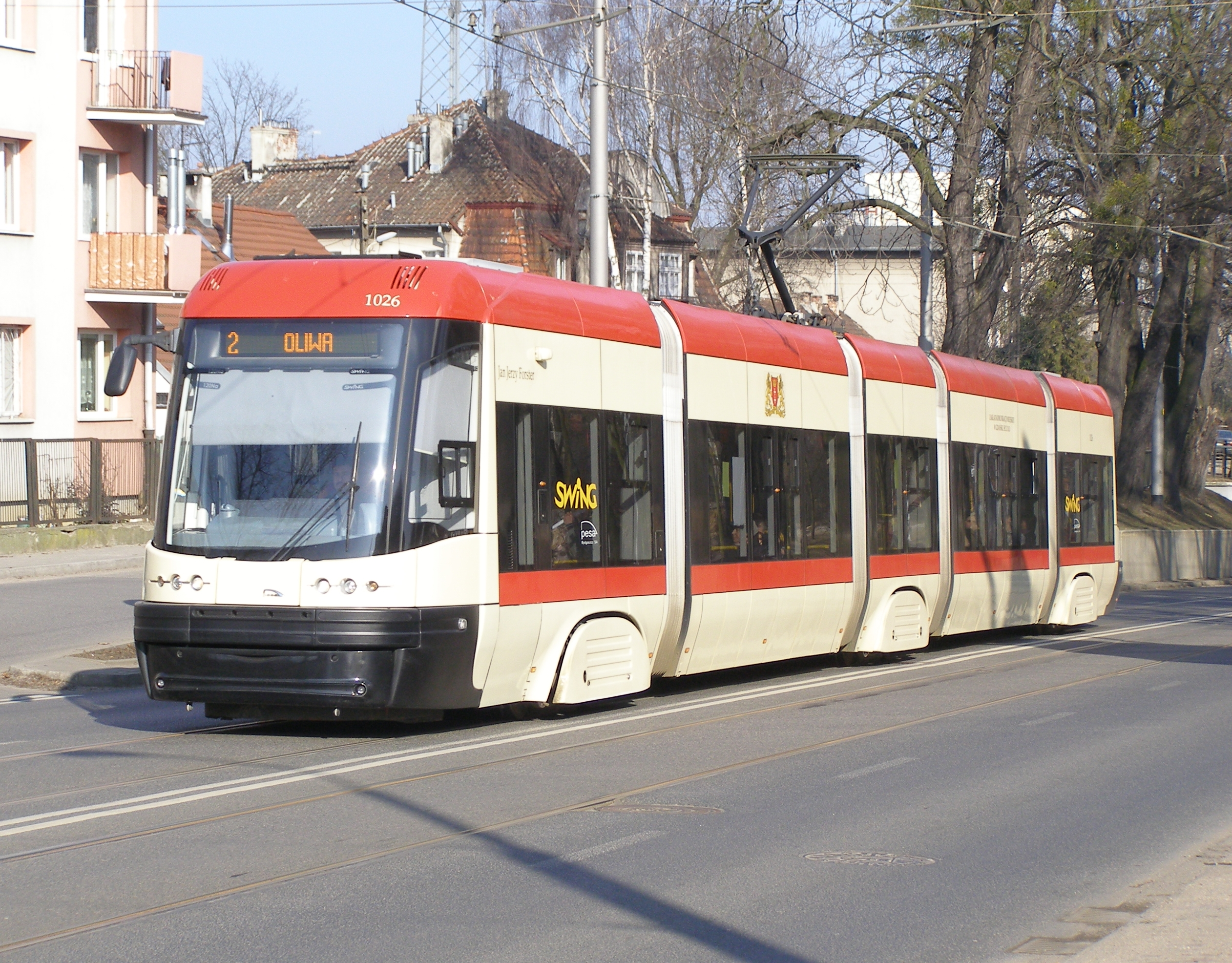
PESA Swing

In 2009, as a part of the tramway modernization project, a tender was issued for 35 one-directional, low-floored, multibody trams from 30 to 35 meters long with a capacity of at least 220 persons. Pesa Bydgoszcz won the contract and provided 35 Swing 120NaG trams by the end of 2011.

In May 2010, the renovation and modernization of the tram depot in Wrzeszcz commenced. Because modern trams contain their electrical apparatuses on their roofs, rather than below the floors, a system of lifts and platforms was established. A sub-track lathe was installed, allowing all the wheels on a tram to be profiled within two hours without necessitating their removal, and a professional cleaning facility was created. A specialized crane was also ordered for the purposes of moving trams across tracks. More tracks were built and the junctions were renovated. About 30 million zł was allocated for the project. On 30 October 2010, the loop near ulica Abrahama was renamed Stryża in order to match the name of its district.

In 2010, during the renovation of the tracks in Siedlce, Zaspa, and Przymorze, the tracks near tram stops were covered in plates or concrete to maintain their cleanliness. This smoother surface is easier to clean.

For New Year's Day 2009–2010, a nightly service was launched for the first time, servicing Chełm – Opera – Zaspa – Oliwa – Wrzeszcz – Opera – Chełm. The current counterpart (Łostowice Świętokrzyska – Chełm – Dworzec Główny – Opera – Zaspa – Oliwa, returning via Wrzeszcz) is operated for various festivities as well as for weekends in summertime.

In 2011, automatic ticket machines began to be installed, making it possible to sell one-time tickets and long-term tickets. The ticket machines were placed near the main stations, transfer points, and at most terminuses.

During construction work on the tracks on Nowy Port, a new junction was built on the route from ulica Wolności to Centrum, allowing Centrum-bound trams to turn about using the large loop, also allowing the creation of a new line from Brzeźno through Nowy Port to Marynarka Polski. A few years earlier, during a renovation of the tracks in Centrum, a new turn allowed trams to run from Hucisko to Dworzec PKS.

In accordance with construction work called Trasy Słowackiego (Polish for 'Słowacki's routes'), a section of the tracks in Brzeźno were modified. Trams from Hallera Avenue had previously turned at Gdańska Street, with the work providing a new link between Hallera Avenue and Gdańska street along Uczniowska street. This redirection allowed trams to run on a Nowy Port-Brzeźno Plaża-Gdańska-Nowy Port routing.

On 12 May 2012, the track to Chełm was expanded to Łostowice and Orunia Górna via Ujeścisko. A transfer terminal (Łostowice Świętokrzyska) was established between Łostowice and Orunia Górna, with space for 150 cars and a bike park.

=== After 2012 ===
On 6 September 2013, a tender was issued for the construction of a tram line to PKM Brętowo via Piecki-Migowo. The winning bid of 116.3 million zł was made by MTM (the contractor for the line to Chełm, Orunia Górna, and Łostowice) and Rajbud. The contract for the investment was signed on 12 November 2013, and the first tram on the line ran on 1 September 2015.

On 30 June 2020, the track to Piecki-Migowo was extended 2.8 km along Paweł Adamowicz Avenue to the Ujeścisko loop at the intersection of Warszawska and Jabłoniowa streets. After financial analysis, Gdańsk authorities decided to expand the new tram route along Lavender Hill street, ending it near the new Elementary School No. 6.

On 14 January 2025, the Siennicki bridge was closed, causing lines 8 and 9 to be shortened to the Głęboka stop located near the bridge. The bridge is scheduled to be reopened in mid-2027. A replacement bus line (T8) has been introduced until the bridge is reopened, operating via Trasa Sucharskiego. Additionally, a temporary ferry line (F8) was introduced to provide a quicker crossing for pedestrians. Bus line 911 was also introduced, going from the Siennicka bus stop (near the ferry dock) towards Górki Zachodnie. Rides on all the temporary lines are free.

=== Historical tram depots ===
The tram depot by aleja Grunwaldzka 527 in Oliwa was the oldest tram depot in Gdańsk. After closure, it was turned into a soap factory, then into a tram depot again. It later fell into ruin after being set on fire several times. The depot by ulica Partyzantów in Wrzeszcz was converted to a bus depot after closure, and replaced by a mall in the 1990s. The depot by Łąkowa street was closed in 1999, and is now a car park. The depot in Plac Drogowy was closed in 2004. The tracks in this depot were connected to railway tracks.

Other former depots include a depot in Siedlce and a depot by ulica Gościnna in Orunia.

== Future ==
In 2025, a new project to link the southern side of the tram network to Wrzeszcz was announced. Construction was to begin in the second quarter of 2025, with completion in 2028. The new line will run from Gdańsk Południe to Wrzeszcz, passing through the neighborhoods of Jasień and Piecki-Migowo. Part of the project involves building a 280 meter tunnel, needed due to changes in elevation on the planned route. The entire project is projected to cost 800 million złoty.

== Maps ==
Maps of trams in Gdańsk, Oliwa,
Krakowiec, Ulica Kartuska & Nowy Port

== Tram lines ==
Up to 11 tram lines can operate simultaneously in Gdańsk. Additional lines are activated when necessary.

Daily	all day	2, 3, 5, 6, 8, 9, 10, 12
Weekdays only	all day	4, 11
Weekdays only	peak hours only	7
Seasonal	weekends (numbered 6X)	63, 68
Nightly	seasonal on weekends or during local festivities	N0

Line	Scheme	Route	Length in km	Average time to circuit (minutes)	Number of stops	Handling	Trams
2		Lawendowe Wzgórze – (Strzyża PKM) – Jelitkowo via Dworzec Główny PKP, Baltic Opera and Zaspa	18	60–61	30-31	Wrzeszcz	NGT6, N8C-NF, 120NaG, 128NG
3		Brzeźno Dom Zdrojowy – Łostowice Świętokrzyska via Baltic Opera and Dworzec Główny PKP	11	36–40	24	Nowy Port, Wrzeszcz	N8C-NF, 120NaG, 128NG
4		Lawendowe Wzgórze – Jelitkowo via PKS Station, Baltic Opera, and Zaspa	14	45	35	Wrzeszcz	NGd99, NGT6, N8C-NF, 120NaG, 128NG
5		Oliwa – Nowy Port Oliwska via Przymorze, Oliwa, Wrzeszcz and Brzeźno	18	62–68	41–44	Wrzeszcz; Nowy Port	105Na, N8C-NF, 120NaG, NGd99, NGT6, 114Na, 128NG
6		Łostowice Świętokrzyska – Jelitkowo via Brama Wyżynna, Baltic Opera, Wrzeszcz and Oliwa	18	57–60	33–34	Wrzeszcz	NGd99, NGT6, N8C-NF, 120NaG
7		Łostowice Świętokrzyska – Nowy Port Oliwska via Brama Wyżynna, Jana z Kolna and Letnica	14	37–41	20–22	Nowy Port; Wrzeszcz	N8C-NF, 120NaG, 128NG
8		Jelitkowo – Głęboka – ~~Stogi~~ via Zaspa, Kliniczna and Jana z Kolna Line shortened to the Głęboka stop until 2027 due to the closure of the Siennicki Bridge	13,5	48–59	30-39	Nowy Port, Wrzeszcz	N8C-NF, 120NaG, 128NG
9		Strzyża PKM – Głęboka – ~~Stogi Plaża~~ via Balic Opera, Dworzec Główny PKP and ~~Przeróbka~~ Line shortened to the Głęboka stop until 2027 due to the closure of the Siennicki Bridge	9,5	33-34	22	Wrzeszcz	NGD99, N8C-NF, 120NaG 128NG
10		Brętowo PKM – Zajezdnia Nowy Port – (Nowy Port Góreckiego) via Siedlce and Letnica	13	30–31	25–26	Nowy Port; Wrzeszcz	N8C-NF, 128NG
11		Lawendowe Wzgórze – Strzyża PKM via Chełm and Dworzec Główny PKP	14	43–46	29–30	Wrzeszcz	N8C-NF, 128NG
12		Ujeścisko – Zaspa via Jasień, Siedlce, Baltic Opera and Wrzeszcz	22	73–75	45	Wrzeszcz	NGD99, NGT6, N8C-NF, 120NaG, 128NG
63		Łostowice Świętokrzyska – Brzeźno Plaża – Nowy Port Oliwska via Brama Wyżynna and Opera Bałtycka	13	41	27	Nowy Port; Wrzeszcz	N8C-NF
68		Łostowice Świętokrzyska - Stogi Plaża via Chełm and Przeróbka	13,5	39–40	25–26	Wrzeszcz	N8C-NF

== Rolling stock ==
As of April 2025, the current fleet consists of:

Photo	Type	Production	Number
	Konstal 114Na	1997 modernization: 2009, 2015–2017	2
	Konstal NGd99	1999–2000 modernization: 2016–2017	4
	Bombardier NGT6	2007	3
	Duewag N8C	production: 1978–1986 modernization: 2009, 2015, 2017	60
	PESA 120Na	2010–2011	35
	PESA 128NG	2014, 2019–2021	35
Number of vehicles			141

== See also ==
- Moderus Beta (modernized tram)
