= M8C =

M8C may refer to:

- The M8C spotting rifle, the spotting rifle affixed to the M40 recoilless rifle
- The M8C model of the McLaren M8A
- The M8C tram, manufactured in Germany as part of the Stadtbahnwagen M/N family
