= Citadis 100 =

Two series of low-floor trams from the Citadis family

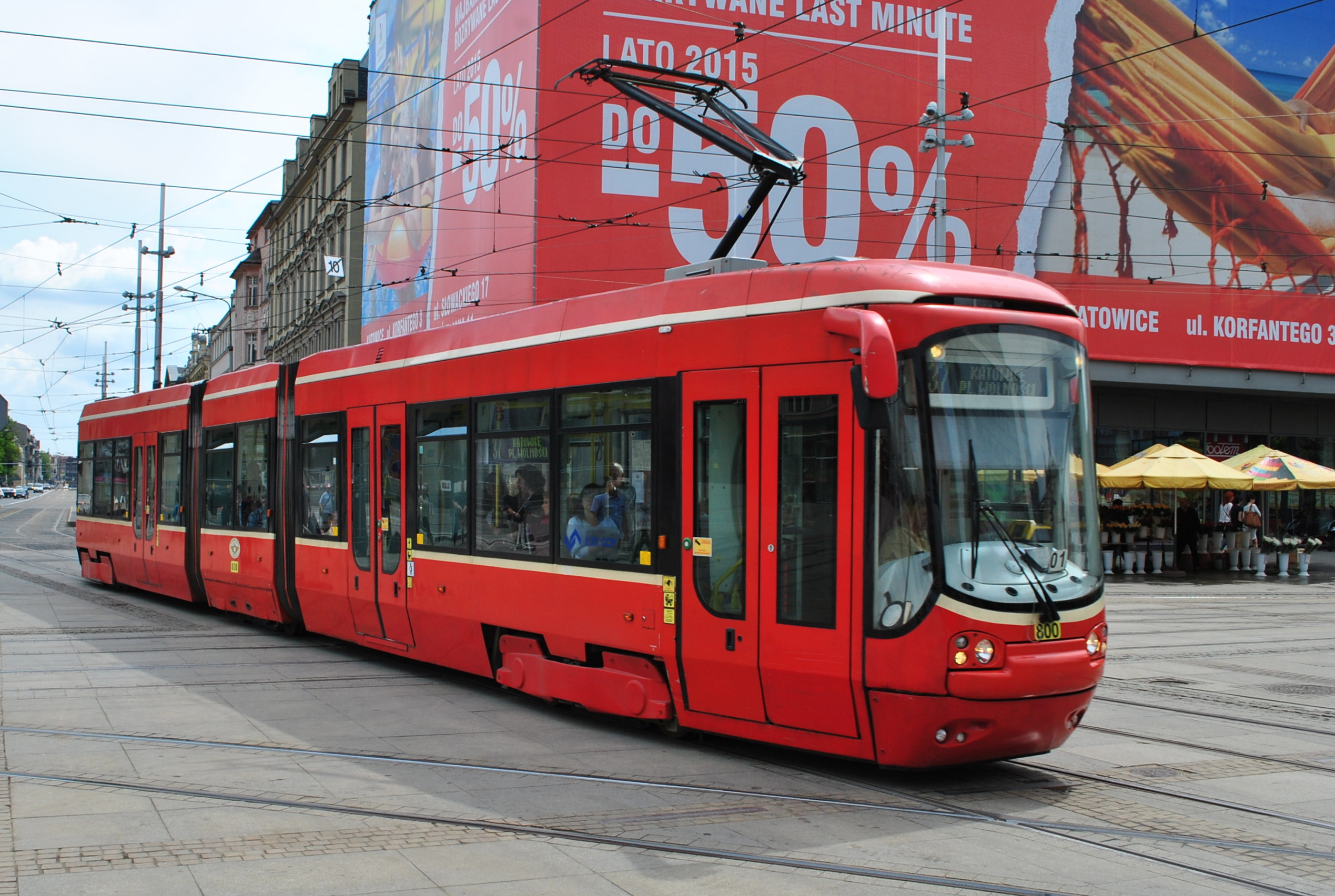
- Citadis 100 in Katowice
- Stock type: electric multiple unit
- Manufacturer: Konstal
- Assembly: Chorzów, Poland
- Constructed: 1999–2001
- Number built: 21
- Capacity: 34–49

Specifications
- Train length: 24,050–26,600 mm (78.90–87.27 ft)
- Floor height: 340–590 mm (1.12–1.94 ft)
- Low-floor: 70–73%
- Articulated sections: 3
- Maximum speed: 80 km/h (50 mph)
- Weight: 28,000–30,000 kg (62,000–66,000 lb)

The Citadis 100 are two series of low-floor trams from the Citadis family, produced at Konstal's plant in Chorzów from 1999 to 2001. A total of 21 units were built, currently operated in Gdańsk (4 units) and the Silesian Interurbans (17 units).

== History ==
In 1995, Konstal produced its first tram featuring a low-floor section (around 25%) – the two-section model 112N. A single unit was made and sold to Warsaw. In 1997, Konstal produced another partially low-floor tram model (around 15%) – the three-section 114Na, with two units sold to Gdańsk.

In 1998, Konstal, in cooperation with Warsaw Trams, developed further prototypes of low-floor trams – one unit of the 116N model and two units of the 116Na model. From 1998 to 2000, 26 serial units of the 116Na/1 model were produced. These trams consisted of three sections and had approximately 60% low-floor area.

Building on the experience from the production of these trams, particularly the 116Na type, Konstal developed a new tram family – the Citadis 100, specifically designed for the Polish market (in 1997, Konstal was acquired by the French Alstom corporation).

== Construction ==
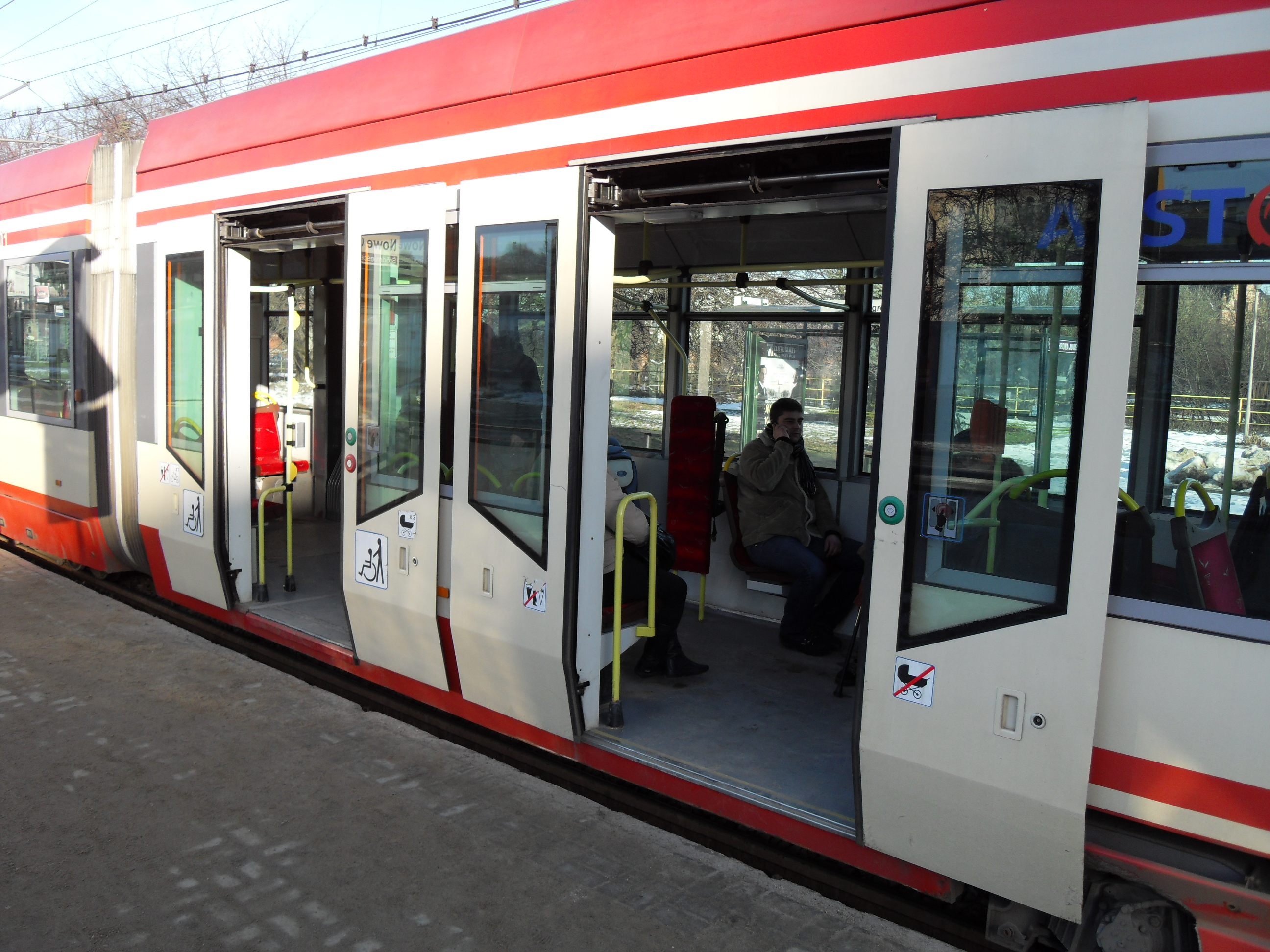
Entry to NGd99

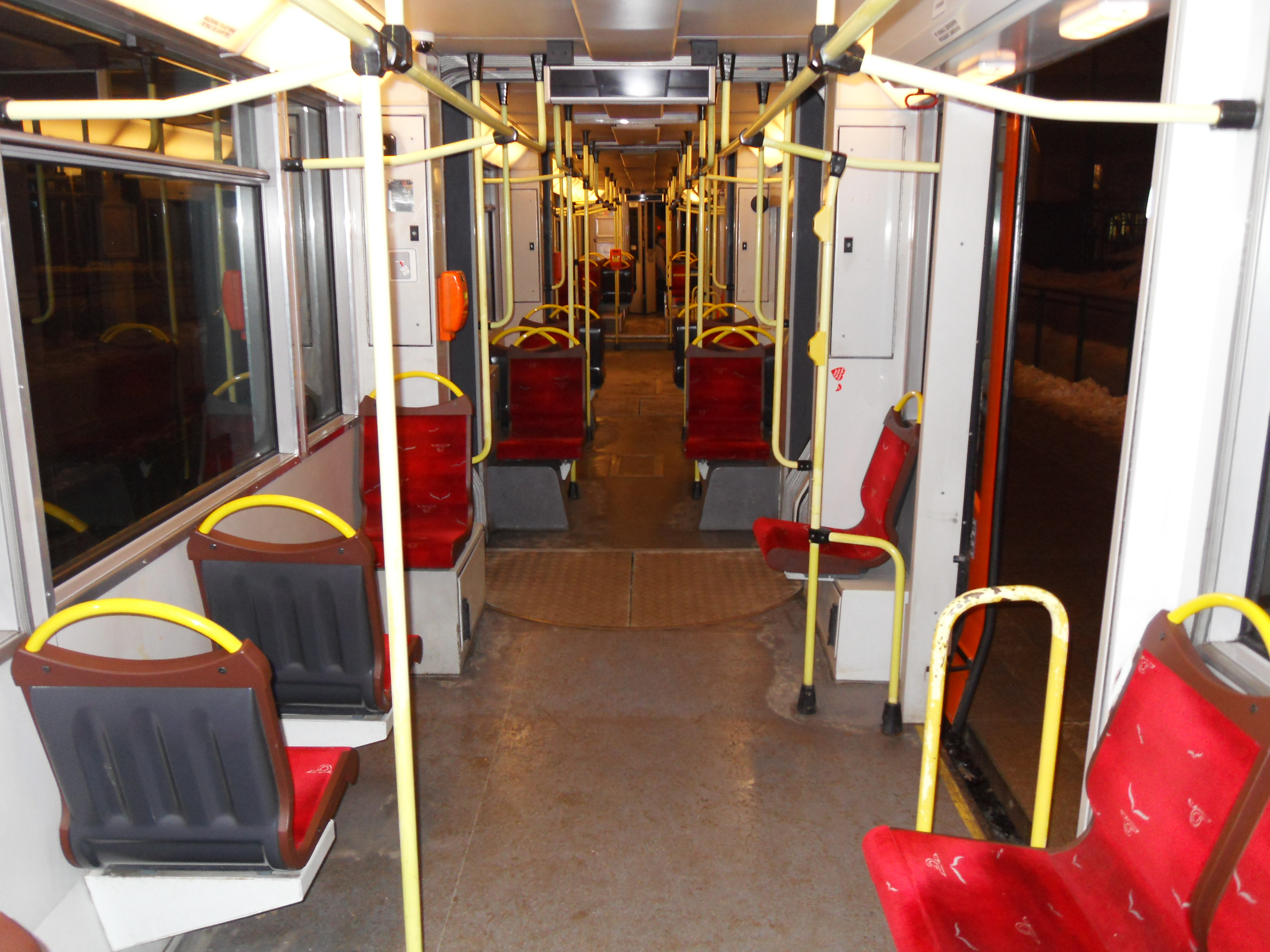
Interior of NGd99

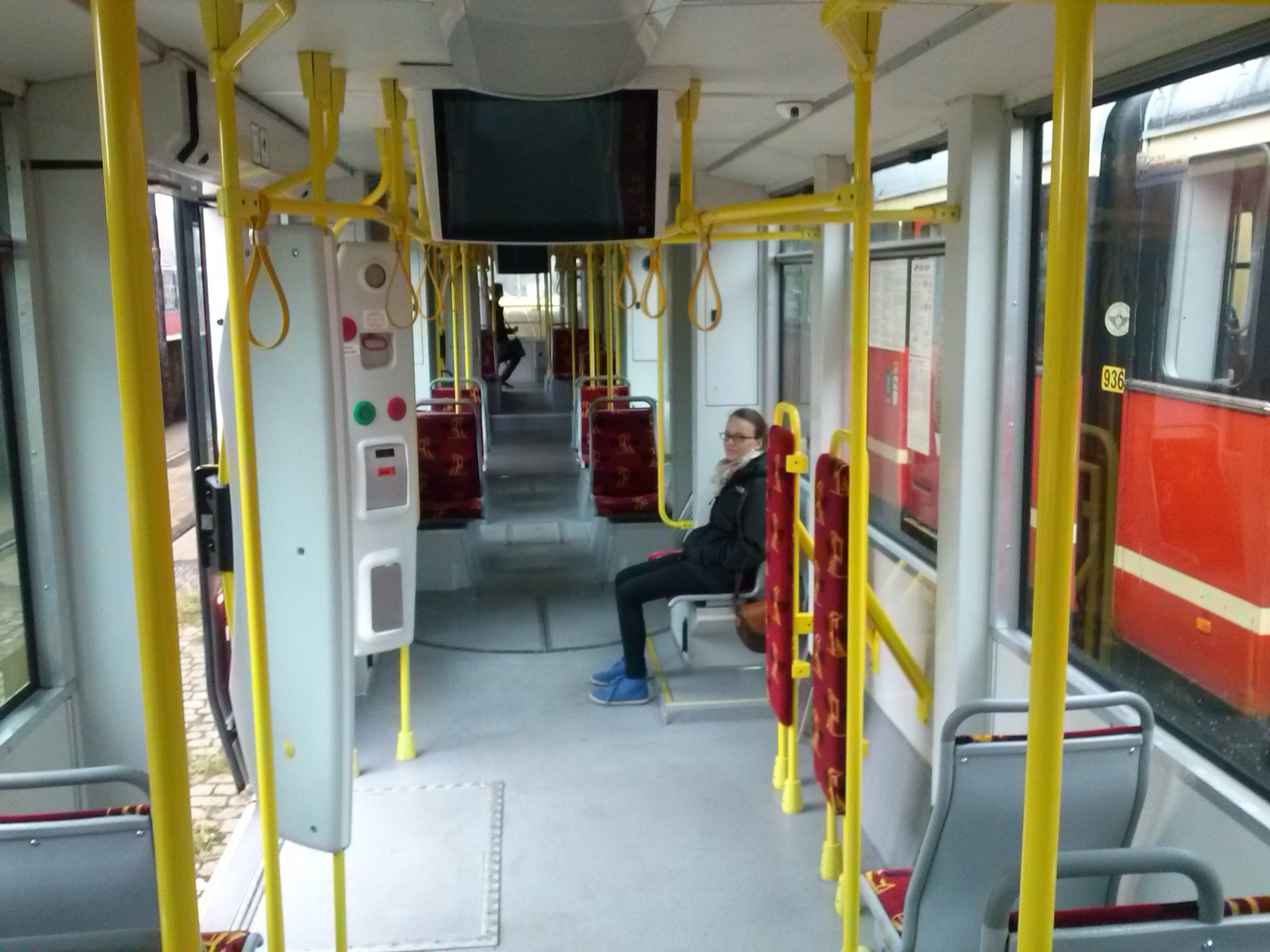
Interior of 116Nd

Citadis 100 trams are three-section, single-direction, partially low-floor trams.

Type	Length	Weight	Number and power of otors	Seating capacity	Door layout	Low-floor percentage	Sources
NGd99	26.6 m	30 t	4 × 140 kW	49	1-2-2-2-2-1	70%	
116Nd	24.05 m	28 t	4 × 120 kW	22	2-2-2-2	73%	

=== Bogies ===
The trams are built on two powered bogies under the outer sections and one trailing bogie under the middle section. The powered bogies for the Citadis 100 trams were manufactured by Linke-Hofmann-Busch in Salzgitter, and Konstal had previously installed the same bogies in Citadis 200 trams for Magdeburg. The trailing bogies were manufactured in Chorzów.

=== Body ===
The NGd99 model features two pairs of two-leaf, sliding doors with a 1,300 mm width in the low-floor sections of the 1st and 3rd segments. Additionally, there is a single-leaf door at the beginning of the 1st segment and at the end of the 3rd segment, with the first door serving as an entry for the driver. The 116Nd model also has two pairs of two-leaf, sliding doors with a 1,300 mm width in the 1st and 3rd segments, with the first leaf of the first door designated as the driver's entrance.

The lowered floor height in the high-floor area of the Citadis 100 allows the windows to be aligned along a single line, with some windows featuring a small upper section that can tilt open.

Both the NGd99 and 116Nd trams include a retractable platform near the second set of doors to facilitate access for passengers using wheelchairs, which can be controlled from the driver's console.

The Citadis 100 trams are equipped with external pixel displays that serve as destination boards.

=== Engines ===
The Citadis 100 trams are powered by four air-cooled induction motors, each with a power rating of 120 or 140 kW. The control system is based on IGBT semiconductor components and allows for energy recovery during regenerative braking. Conversion from direct to alternating current occurs in Onix 800 power inverters, manufactured by Konstal. All control equipment is mounted on the tram's roof.

=== Interior ===
The NGd99 passenger compartment includes 44 seats and a designated area for securing wheelchairs. The passenger section of the 116Nd provides 22 standard seats, 12 extra-wide seats (1½) measuring 70 cm, and two wheelchair attachment areas. Multi-functional columns located near the doors feature ticket validators, emergency brakes, door-opening buttons, passenger information speakers, and waste bins.

The driver's station in the Citadis 100 trams, in addition to standard equipment, is equipped with air conditioning and a technical computer that displays real-time information about essential components.

=== Modernizations ===
In March 2016, Gdańsk announced a tender for the modernization of all four trams. Modertrans won the contract as the sole bidder, proposing to refurbish each tram by July 2017 at a cost of 1.75 million PLN per vehicle. By the end of May, two refurbished trams were present in Gdańsk, one of which was in service.

From mid-2019 to February 2021, Tramwaje Śląskie's Service and Repair Department carried out a modernization of one of the 116Nd trams. The updates included installing a new interior, seats, replacing both internal and external lighting, replacing the glazing with tinted windows, installing air conditioning and USB outlets, and adding visual and auditory passenger information systems. Following the overhaul, the tram was re-designated as type 116Ndm.

== Operations ==
Country	Location	Operator	Type	Delivery Years	Number	Sources
Poland	Gdańsk	Gdańsk trams	NGd99	1999–2000	4	
Poland	Silesian Interurbans	Tramwaje Śląskie	116Nd	2000–2001	10 (17)	
Poland	Silesian Interurbans	Tramwaje Śląskie	116Ndm	from 2021	7	
Total					21	

=== Gdańsk ===
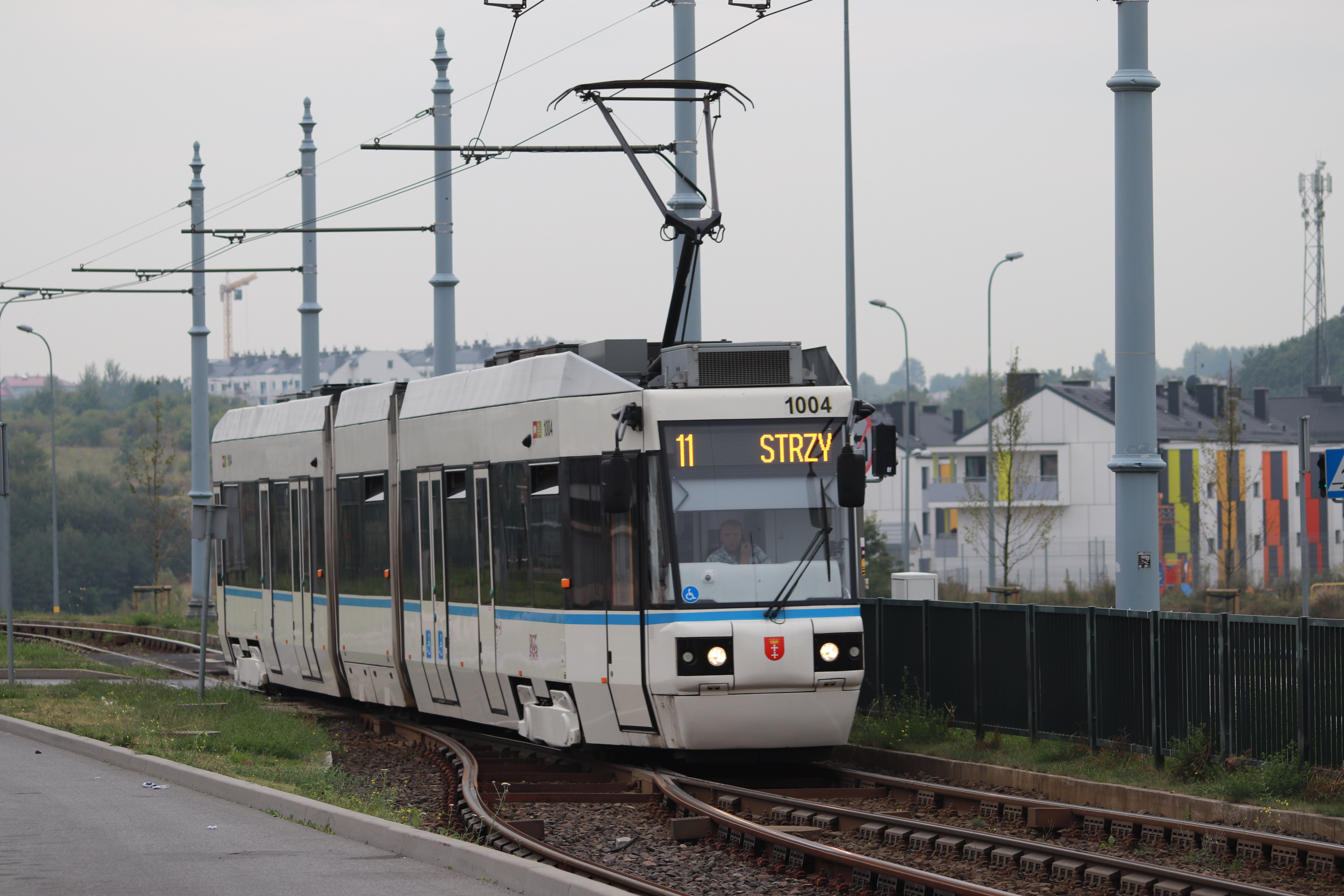
NGd99 in Gdańsk

On 21 December 1999, the first of four ordered Citadis trams arrived in Gdańsk. In the initial days following delivery, the tram was tested on the route between the Wrzeszcz tram depot and the Oliwa loop. The first official run took place on December 29 on line 2, connecting Jelitkowo with Śródmieście, for which these trams were specifically purchased. Scheduled service began with the first vehicle in January 2000, and all deliveries were completed by May.

Between 2009 and 2013, all four trams were repainted to match the new Flexity Classic trams in Gdańsk.

As part of their modernization, the trams received a cream-and-blue livery reminiscent of the pre-war Gdańsk tram colors. Each tram was also dedicated to a Gdańsk priest who was martyred by the Nazis: Franciszek Rogaczewski, Bronisław Komorowski, Marian Górecki, and Bruno Binnebesel.

=== Silesian Interurbans ===
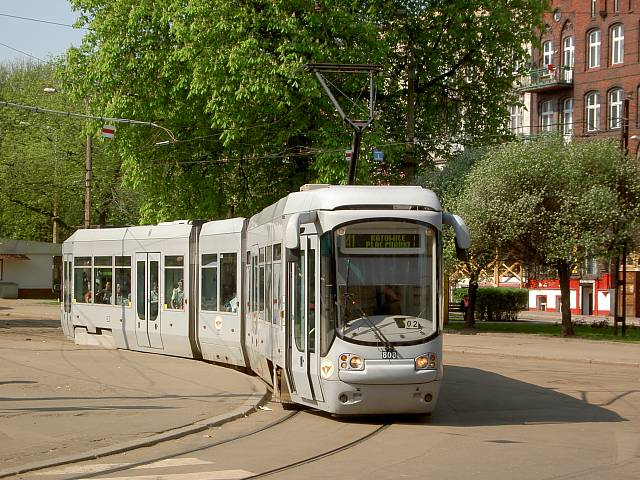
116Nd in Bytom

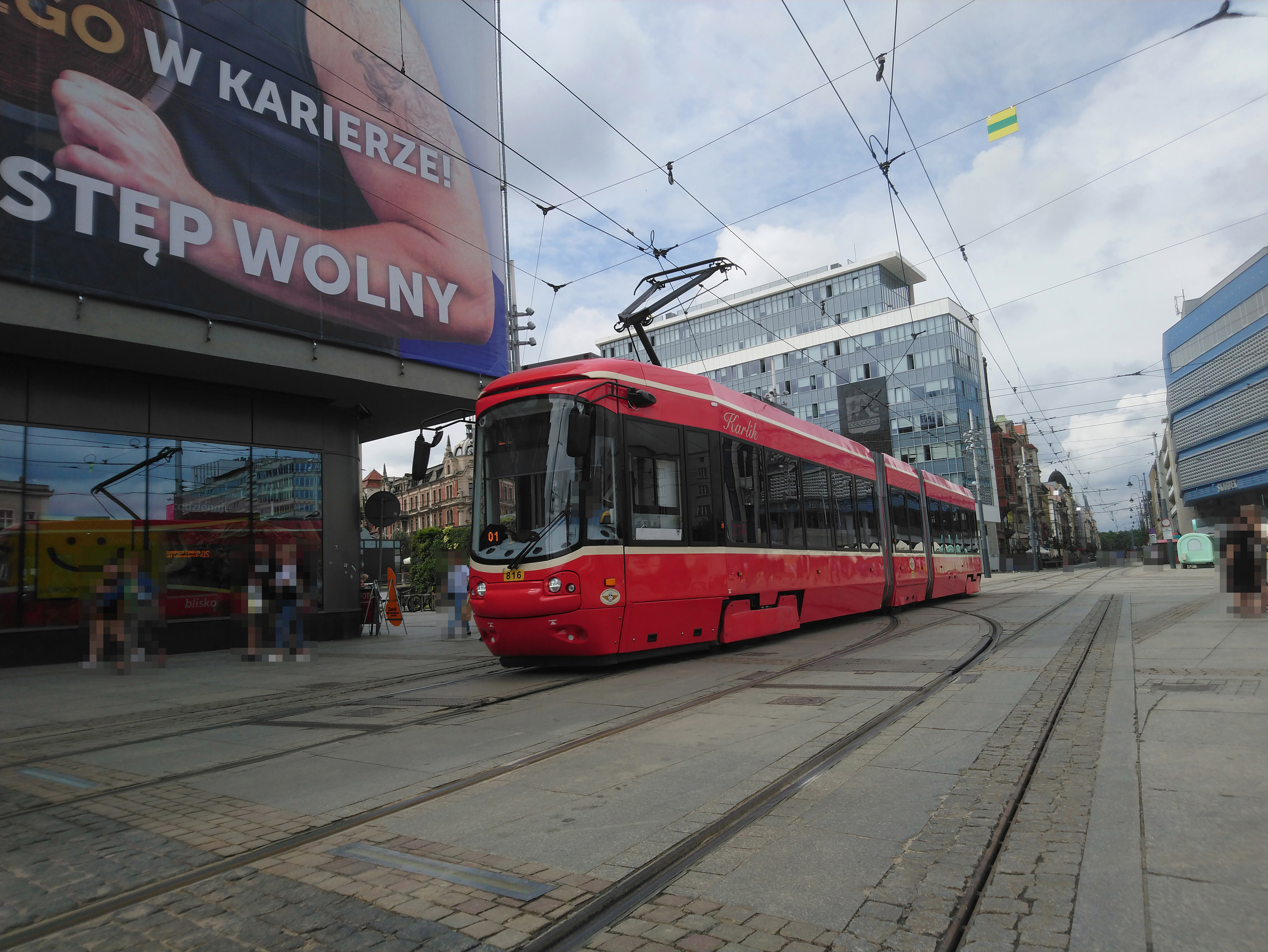
116Ndm in Katowice

In 1998, the Tram Transport Company in Katowice signed a contract with Konstal to purchase 17 Citadis trams and refurbish the Katowice–Chorzów–Bytom route (lines 6 and 41), for which these trams were intended.

On 30 June 2000, the first of the 17 ordered Citadis trams was unveiled at the Konstal plant in Chorzów, followed by a public presentation during Chorzów Days on July 17. Testing began on August 4. The official ceremony for introducing the trams into service took place on 17 September 2001 at the Zawodzie depot, along with presentations in Katowice, Chorzów, and Bytom. The delay in deployment was due to track refurbishments needed to accommodate the Citadis trams. In 2001, a public poll conducted by the local press selected Karlik as the name for these trams.

The trams are stationed at the Zawodzie and Gliwice depots. However, due to loading gauge incompatibility, the Silesian Citadis trams can only operate on specific routes.

Since their introduction in 2001, these Citadis trams were the only low-floor trams in the Upper Silesian urban area until 2014, when Pesa Twist trams began service. With the arrival of the Twists, Citadis trams were redirected to other routes beyond Katowice–Bytom; in 2016, four units served line 4 in Zabrze.

On 2 December 2016, a Citadis tram collided with a truck on Łagiewnicka Street in Bytom, resulting in one injury.

=== Szczecin ===
Due to delays in the delivery of 105N2k/2000 trams, Szczecin received the first low-floor 116Nd tram as compensation. The tram, numbered 783, served passengers on lines 7 and 8 between 21 March and 20 April 2001. After the test period, the tram returned to Katowice, where it was assigned its final fleet number, 800; its previous number was later given to the first delivered 105N2k/2000 tram.

== Bibliography ==
- Lubka, Arkadiusz; Stiasny, Marcin (2011). Atlas tramwajów [Tram Atlas] (in Polish). Poznań: Kolpress. ISBN 978-83-920784-6-3.
