= Moderus Beta (modernized tram) =

Polish trams (2009–2015)

Moderus Beta MF 01, MF 13, MF 14 AC BD, MF 18
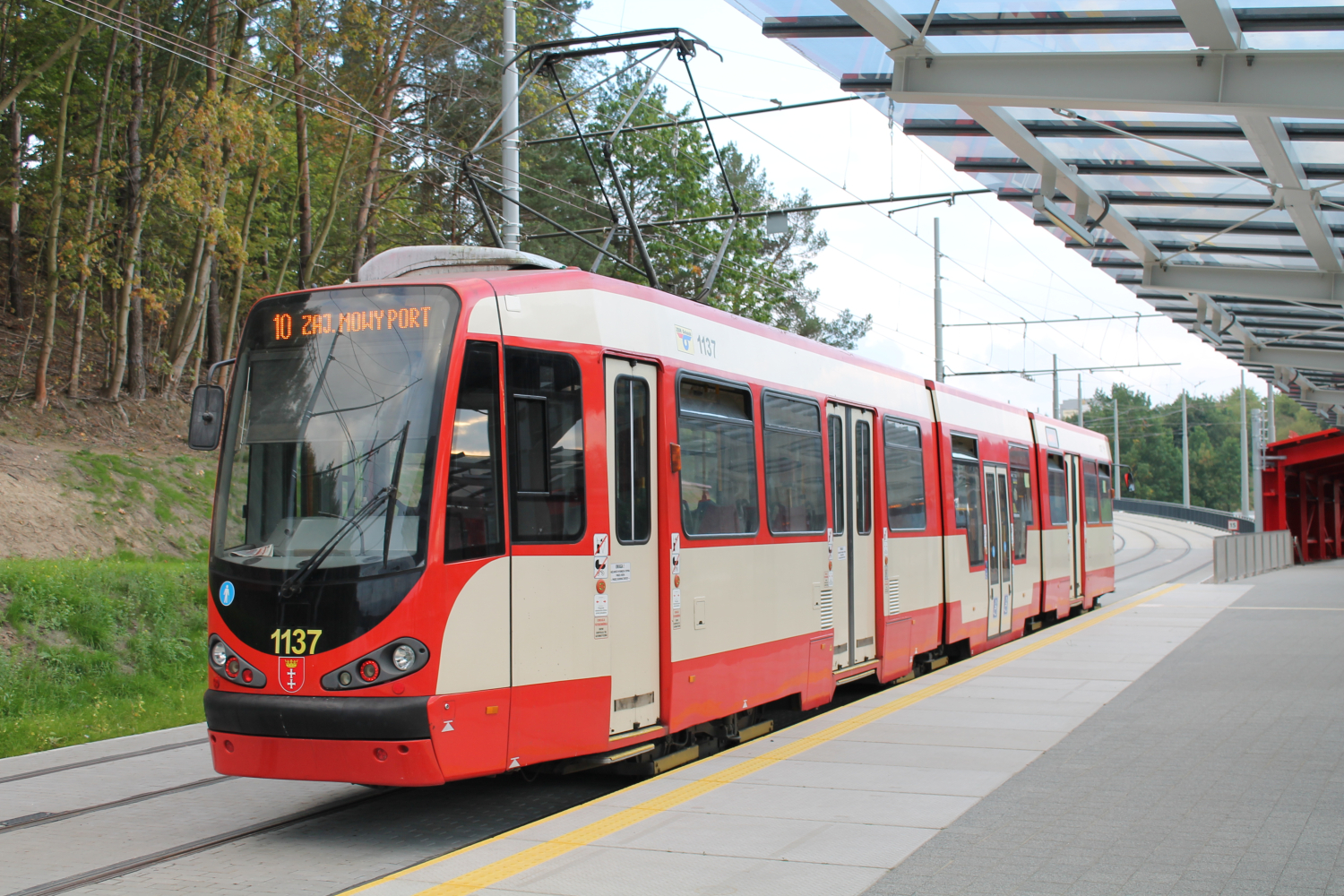
- Moderus Beta MF 01 at platform 2 of the Gdańsk Brętowo railway station
- Manufacturer: Duewag, Modertrans Poznań
- Assembly: Biskupice, Poland
- Constructed: 2009–2015
- Number built: 65
- Capacity: 226

Specifications
- Train length: 26,640 m (87,400 ft)
- Width: 2,330 mm (92 in)
- Height: 3,650 mm (144 in)
- Articulated sections: 3
- Maximum speed: 70 km/h (43 mph)
- Electric system(s): 2 × 150 kW

Moderus Beta are trams resulting from the modernization of German Stadtbahnwagen M/N cars, produced by the company Modertrans Poznań. Between 2009 and 2015, a total of 65 of these trams were modernized, and they operate in Gdańsk and Elbląg.

This was the first use of the name Moderus Beta to designate a tram model from Modertrans. The name was later reused, this time for a tram model built entirely from scratch, partially based on solutions from the previous model.

== Construction ==
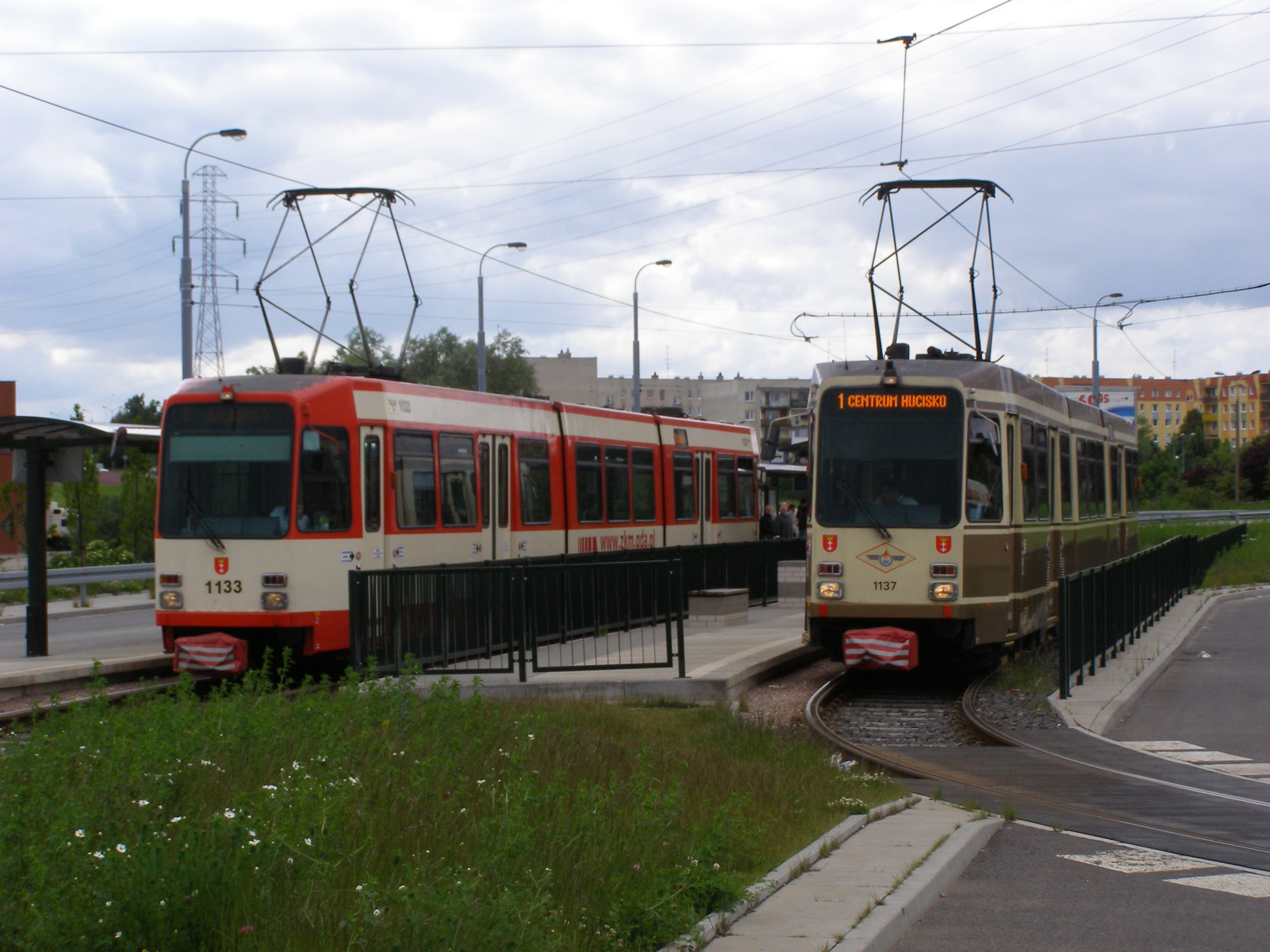
N8C in Gdańsk, before modernization

The vehicle was based on the three-section, bidirectional Stadtbahnwagen M/N tram, produced between 1978 and 1986. A total of 76 such trams were built, with 54 for Dortmund and 22 for Kassel.

The modernization of the tram involved adding a low-floor central section, of a new design, between the existing end sections. The new section is equipped with outward-opening doors, resulting in wide, unobstructed entrances without a central post, allowing for quick passenger exchange. This section was manufactured in Biskupice. Both ends of the tram were replaced with new, modern designs featuring curved, panoramic front windows. The new motorman's cabin includes a roll cage that protects the driver in case of a collision.

The Moderus Beta MF 01 (N8C) tram is mounted on four two-axle bogies. The bogies in the first and third sections are powered, while the Jacobs bogies under the articulations are non-powered. The Moderus Beta is equipped with two traction motors, each rated at 150 kW.

The tram can carry a total of 226 passengers.

During the first modernization for Gdańsk, the trams were equipped with traditional ticket validators, electronic displays, new plastic seats, monitoring systems, and air conditioning in the motorman's cabin. The trams for Gdańsk from the second series were additionally equipped with air conditioning for the passenger area. One tram from the second series for Gdańsk was painted in cream and blue colors, reminiscent of the pre-war Gdańsk tram color scheme.

In 2018, the second stage of the modernization of the N8C trams began in Gdańsk, which included replacing the motors, lighting, heating, and sandboxes, as well as installing ABS.

== Operation ==
Country	City	Type	Delivery years	Number	Sources
Poland	Gdańsk	N8C – MF 01	2009–2012	46	
Poland	Gdańsk	N8C – MF 18	2015	16	
Poland	Elbląg	M8C – MF 13	2013	2	
Poland	Elbląg	M8C – MF 14 AC BD	2015	1	
Total				65	

=== Gdańsk ===
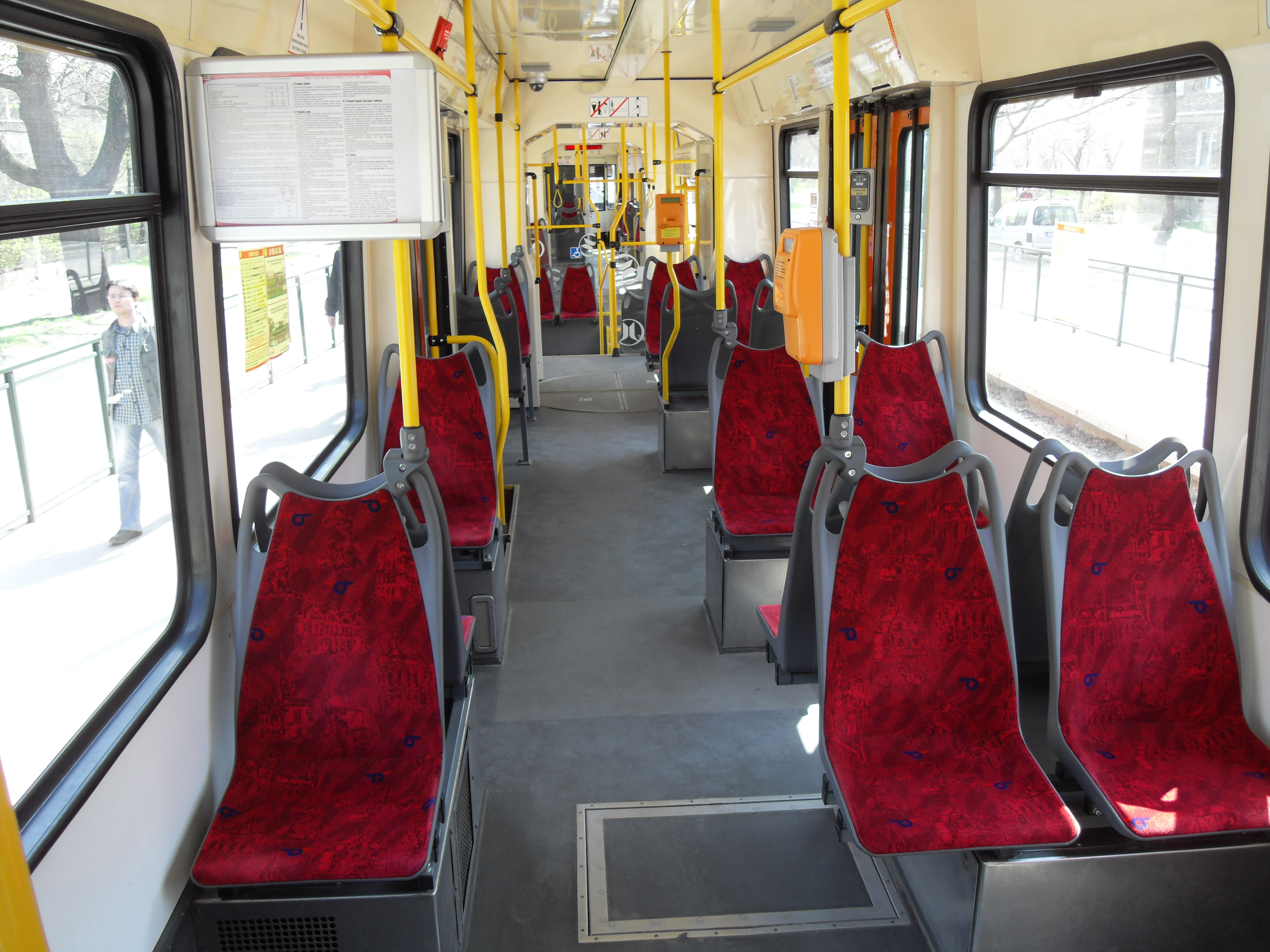
Interior

In 2007, the then ZKM Gdańsk (now Gdańsk Buses and Trams since 2017) purchased 46 Düwag N8C trams withdrawn from service in Dortmund. Initially, they were acquired to serve the planned line to Chełm, which the Konstal 105Na trams, dominant in the operator's fleet, could not accommodate. The first non-modernized tram was delivered to Gdańsk in February 2007. On 28 April 2007, these trams began operating on the temporary line 98 (from Jelitkowo to Zaspa).

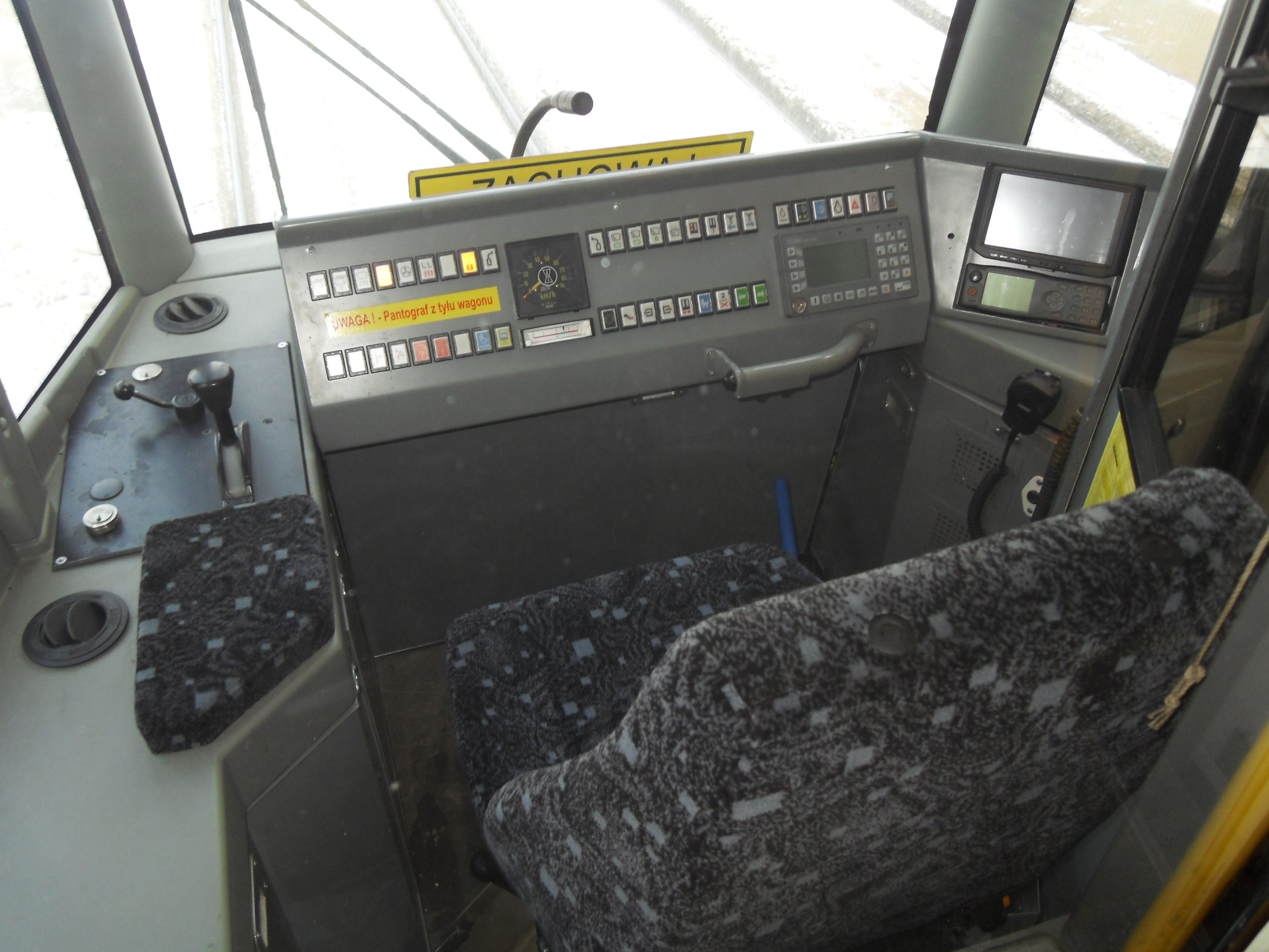
Motorman's cabin

In 2008, a tender was resolved, resulting in all the trams being sent for modernization at Modertrans Poznań. Modertrans initially faced problems with the modernization, causing significant delays. The first modernized N8C was delivered on 24 April 2009. This tram arrived inoperable and had to be towed to the Wrzeszcz depot, a fact criticized by the local press. The last tram arrived on 13 April 2012, nearly a year and a half overdue. The delays led to the unexpected arrival of non-modernized trains in Gdańsk. Initially, the trams were assigned to the Wrzeszcz depot, replacing Konstal 105Na trams, which were either transferred to Nowy Port or scrapped. From May 2011, due to deliveries of Pesa Swing trams, the Moderus Beta MF 01 trams were also assigned to the Nowy Port depot, replacing Konstal 105Na trams. A significant advantage of these trams is their bidirectionality, which is useful during track repairs. While the trams can be operated in multiple units, this is not utilized due to the short station stops.

In May 2014, Gdańsk purchased 14 more N8C trams, this time from Kassel. Modertrans was the only bidder in the tender for their modernization, but its offer was rejected due to exceeding the budget. In the next tender, Modertrans' offer was selected, and in November, a contract was signed for the modernization of 16 N8C trams (meanwhile, Gdańsk bought 2 additional trams from Kassel). The first tram from the second batch was delivered to Gdańsk overnight from March 1 to 2, 2015. By early May, the first two trams from this batch were in service. Deliveries of the modernized trams were completed by mid-August.

In mid-July 2016, two trams were flooded during a flood in Gdańsk.

In August 2017, Gdańsk Buses and Trams announced a tender for the repair of: 2 trams from Dortmund affected by the flood, 8 trams from Kassel requiring drivetrain replacement, and 1 tram from Kassel damaged in an accident. Modertrans was the only bidder for the repair of the 3 damaged trams, while drivetrain replacement was offered by 4iB. However, the tender was canceled – Modertrans exceeded the cost estimate, and 4iB did not submit a bid bond. Ultimately, in late May and early June 2018, Gdańsk Buses and Trams signed a contract with Modertrans for the repair of 2 flooded trams, and on June 15 with 4iB for the modernization of drivetrain and control systems in 13 N8C-MF18 trams and 8 N8C-MF01 trams. By mid-September 2018, two trams were ready.

Between July and August 2017, one tram received a gold wrap as part of an external campaign dedicated to Hans Memling's The Last Judgment, commissioned by the National Museum in Gdańsk.

On 13 December 2021, during a fire at the Nowy Port depot, 2 N8C trams were destroyed, and 1 was damaged.

=== Elbląg ===
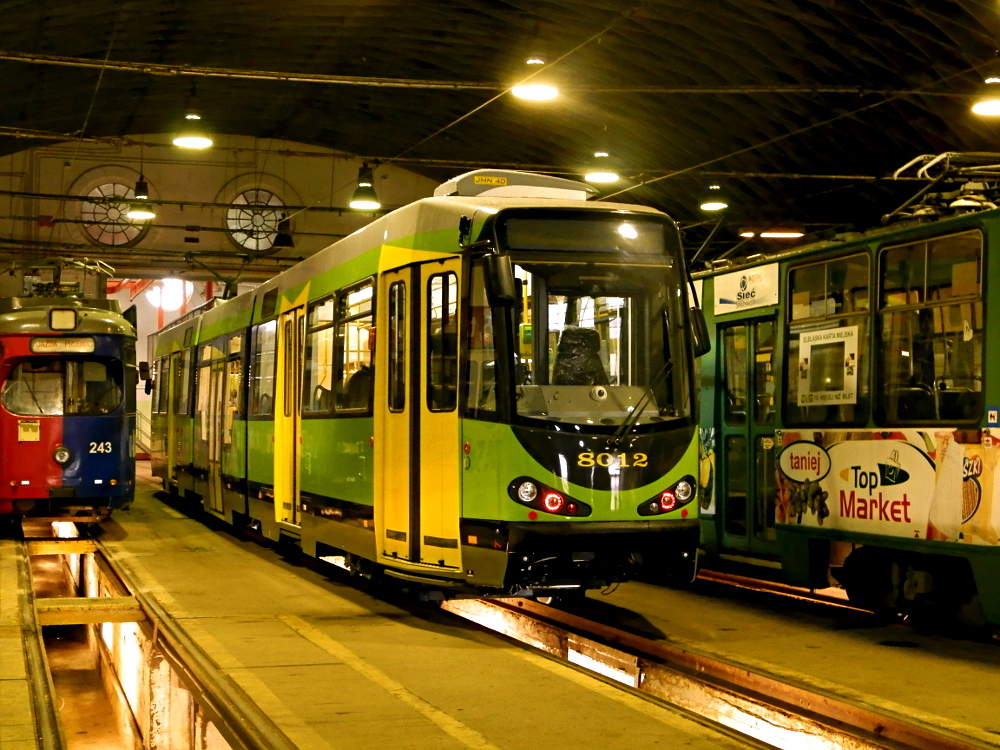
Düwag M8C in Elbląg

Trams in Elbląg acquired two M8C trams (a narrow-gauge version of the N8C) from Augsburg, which were modernized in the same way as the Gdańsk trams. According to the tender conditions, only bids from companies with experience in modernizing at least 3 such trams and certified for operation in Poland were accepted. On May 7, the decision was made to award the contract to Modertrans.

On 18 October 2013, the first of the two modernized trams was delivered to Elbląg, and it was presented on 10 January 2014.

At the beginning of 2014, Elbląg purchased another M8C tram from Augsburg, intending to modernize it. On August 18, the company signed a contract with Modertrans for its modernization, and in July 2015, the modernized tram returned to Elbląg.

At the beginning of 2016, Elbląg purchased an additional 3 M8C trams, this time from Mülheim an der Ruhr. However, the operator did not intend to modernize these trams.
