= Konstal 114Na =

Tram by Konstal in Poland

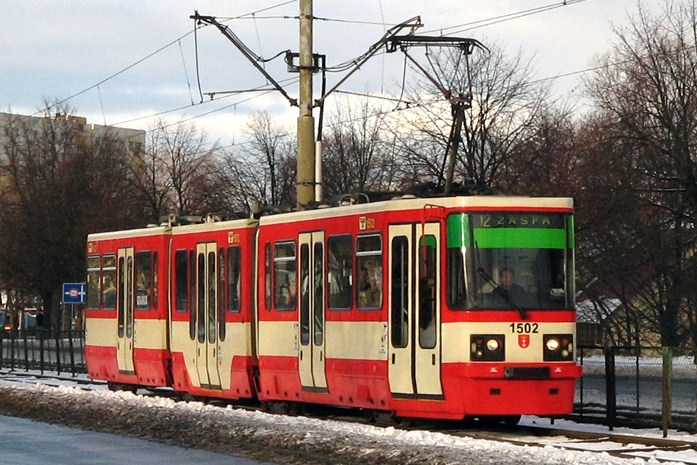
- Konstal 114Na on Chłopska Street in Gdańsk, 2006
- Stock type: Low-floor tram
- Manufacturer: Konstal
- Assembly: Chorzów, Poland
- Constructed: 1997
- Entered service: 1997

Specifications
- Train length: 26,000 millimetres (85 ft)
- Low-floor: 13%
- Articulated sections: 3
- Maximum speed: 70 kilometres per hour (43 mph)
- Weight: 34,000 kilograms (75,000 lb)
- Power output: 8 × 41,5 kW
- Seating: 32 + 4 fold-out

Konstal 114Na (after modernization 114Na – MF 12) is an articulated low-floor tram, manufactured in 1997 by Konstal works in Chorzów, in a quantity of 2 units for the Gdańsk Municipal Transport Company. It is the second low-floor tram type produced in Poland after the 112N. A significant part of the solutions was taken from the previously produced single unit of the 112N type.

== History ==
=== Origins ===
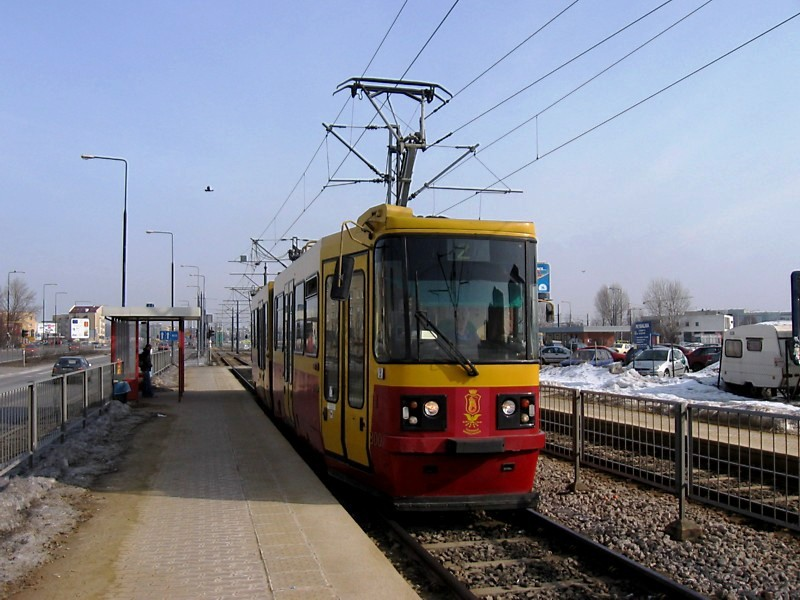
Konstal 112N

In the late 1960s, the production of the first Polish modern trams, Konstal 13N, was completed, and work was underway on further tram models. Among many projects, only Konstal 102N and its modified version, Konstal 102Na, were successfully implemented. However, the production of these trams did not meet the current needs, so in 1973, the prototype of the Konstal 105N tram was developed. The model was put into production in 1974 and was well received by transportation authorities due to its modern design. Despite this, significant changes were introduced to the design after just 5 years, resulting in the most popular model in the Konstal 105Na family. Vehicles of this generation were still being produced in the 1990s, although they were considered outdated and underwent various modernizations.

In September 1992, a GT6N tram from Bremen was tested in Warsaw; however, the city authorities did not purchase any new low-floor trams. In 1995, Konstal produced its first tram with a low-floor section, the two-section model 112N, which was sold to Warsaw.

During this time, trams in Gdańsk were in poor condition, both in terms of rolling stock and infrastructure. The Gdańsk authorities began to modernize their public transportation fleet. The new tram utilized many elements from its predecessor, including the entire front section and the end section of the rear part, effectively being a three-section version of the 112N.

=== Production ===
In 1997, two trams of a new type were produced, which were structurally developed from the 112N tram. The 114Na tram is distinguished primarily from its predecessor by the additional middle section, which houses a low floor. The prototype entered the tracks in Gdańsk on 20 March 1997, while the second one on 18 April 1997. Thanks to this design, Gdańsk became the second city in Poland to have a partially low-floor tram and the first to have more than one such type.

Production ceased after the introduction of the low-floor trams Konstal 116N and Konstal NGd99 into the market.

== Construction ==
=== Body ===
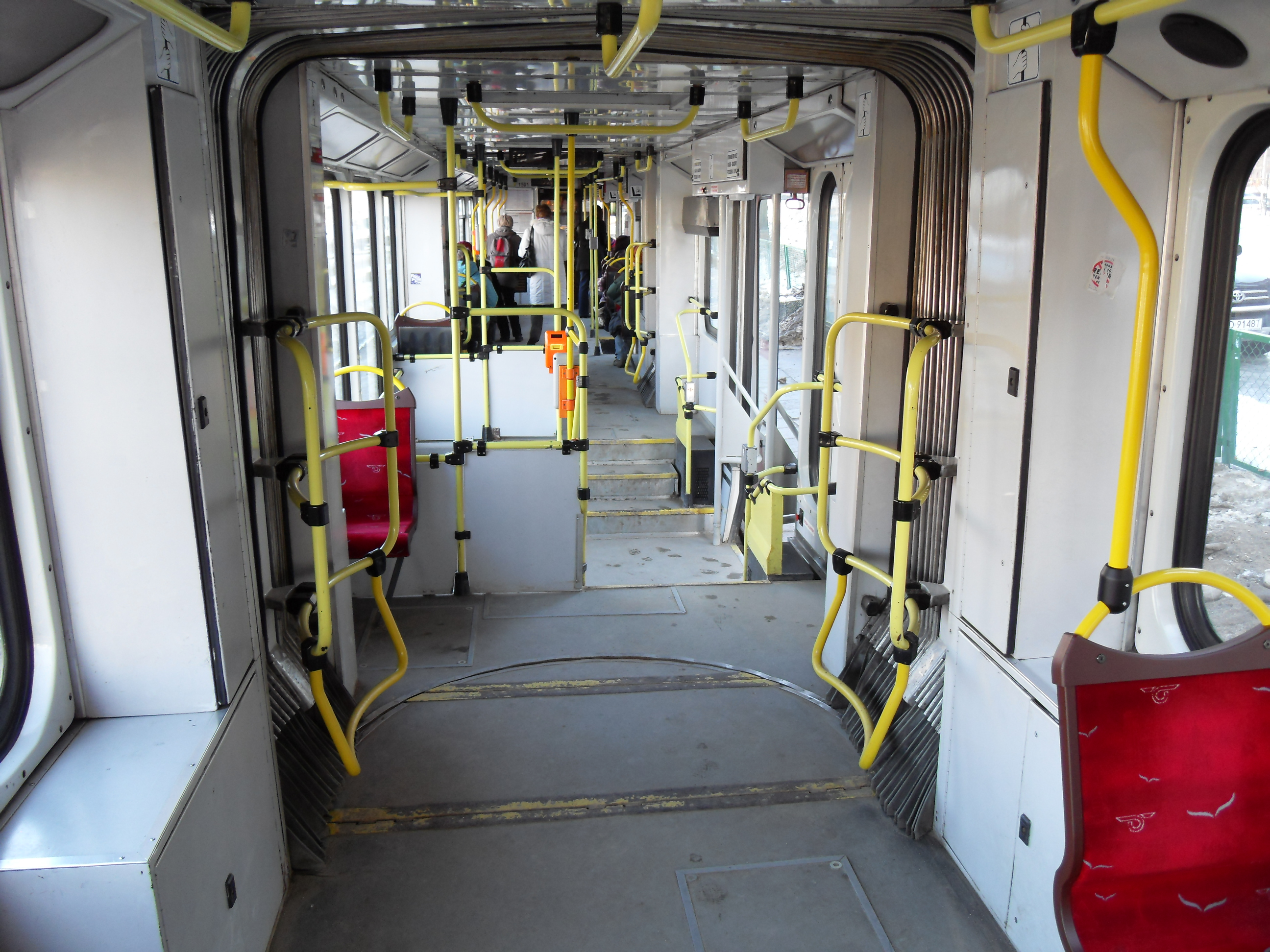
Interior before modernization

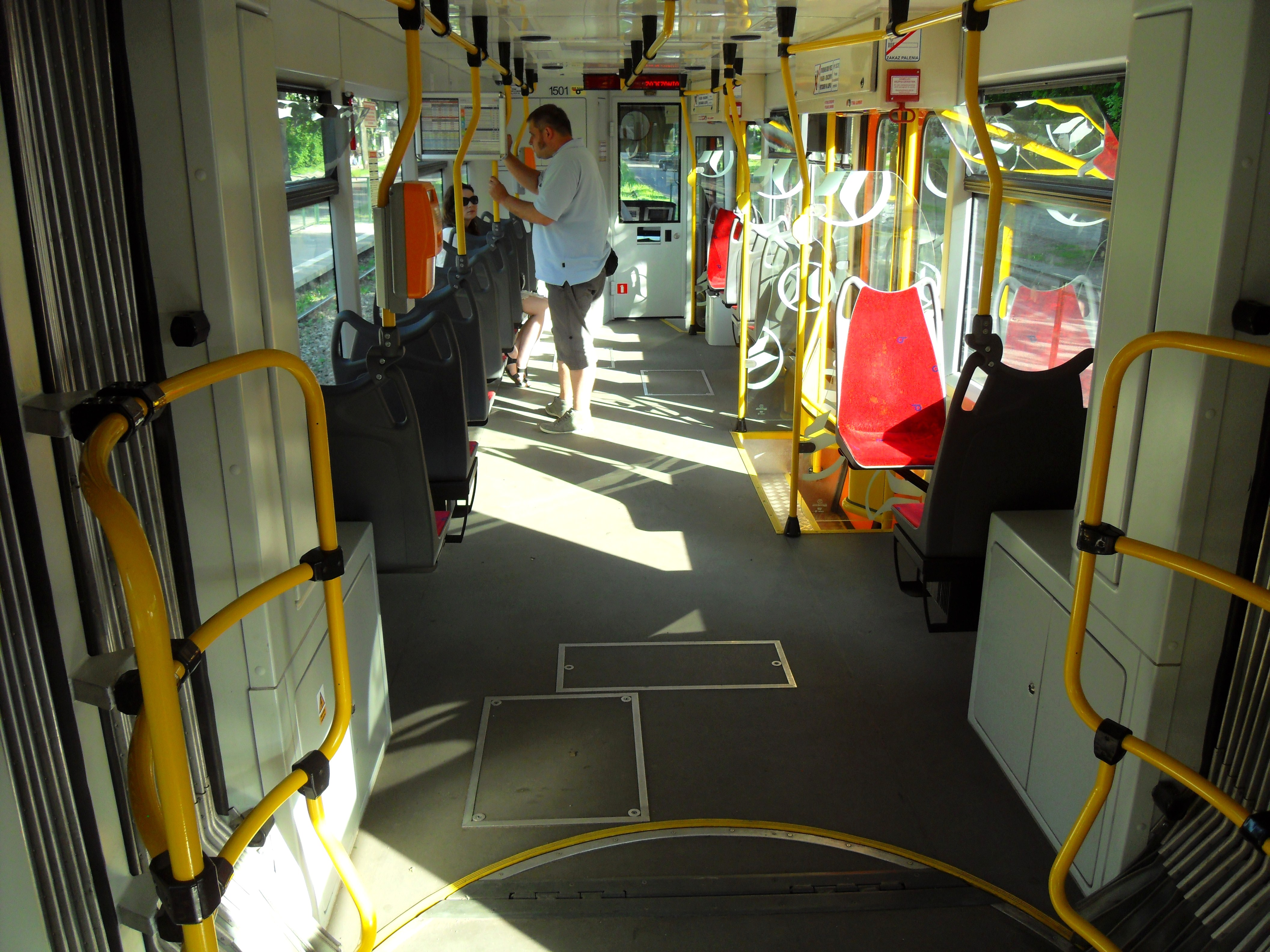
Interior after modernization

The 114Na is a three-section, unidirectional, single-sided tram with 13% low floor accessibility. Compared to its predecessor, an additional section was added, and the low-floor section was placed in the middle compartment. This allows wheelchair users (with the assistance of another person) and strollers to enter. Despite similarities, the body structure was made using a different technology than the Konstal 105Na model. The body is made of closed profiles and represents a structural development of the Konstal 112N tram. The connection between the sections is made using double articulation, previously unused in Poland, allowing for quick uncoupling and coupling of the mechanical and electrical parts.

The floor is made of plywood-rubber panels and covered with anti-slip flooring. The flooring is smooth and folded onto the walls to facilitate interior cleaning. The tram is equipped with five doors, each 1,300 mm wide, folding outwards, secured with a triple system to prevent passengers from being caught (sensitive edges, phototube, overload switch). The doors can be opened centrally by the driver and by passengers using buttons.

=== Interior ===
The tram features exclusively single seats, mostly facing forward. The seats were specially designed for this vehicle and were among the most modern seats used worldwide at the time of production. They are vandal-resistant yet covered with elegant fabric. One of the tram's advantages is its large capacity, able to accommodate a total of 285 passengers. This is more than two times the capacity of the 105Na and slightly less than three times the capacity of the 105Na.

The tram is equipped with forced air heating. There are no ventilation or air conditioning devices inside the carriage; only natural ventilation is possible through tilting windows and roof hatches.

The 114Na is equipped with fluorescent lights illuminating the interior of the body as well as additional lights illuminating the doors.

=== Propulsion system ===
A thyristor-based traction control system is employed, capable of energy recuperation during braking. The entire system is mounted on four traction bogies.

The tram is equipped with a control panel allowing for maneuvering at a speed of 10 km/h.

== Passenger service ==
| Country | City | Year of delivery | Number | Rolling stock number |
|---|---|---|---|---|
| Poland | Gdańsk | 1997 | 2 | 1501-1502 |
| Total number: | | | 2 | |

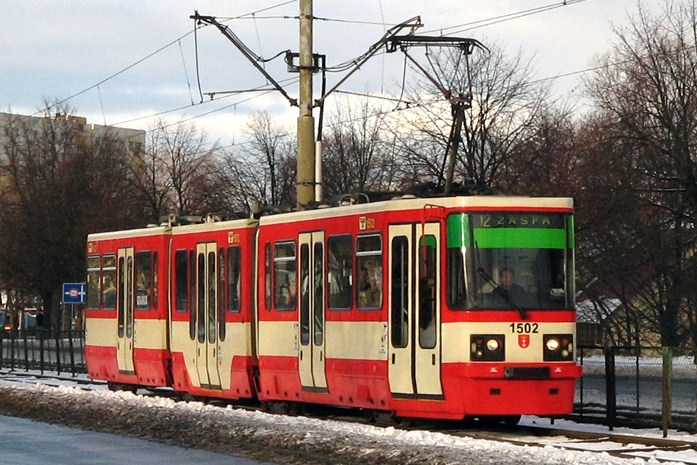
Konstal 114Na before modernization on Siedlce line

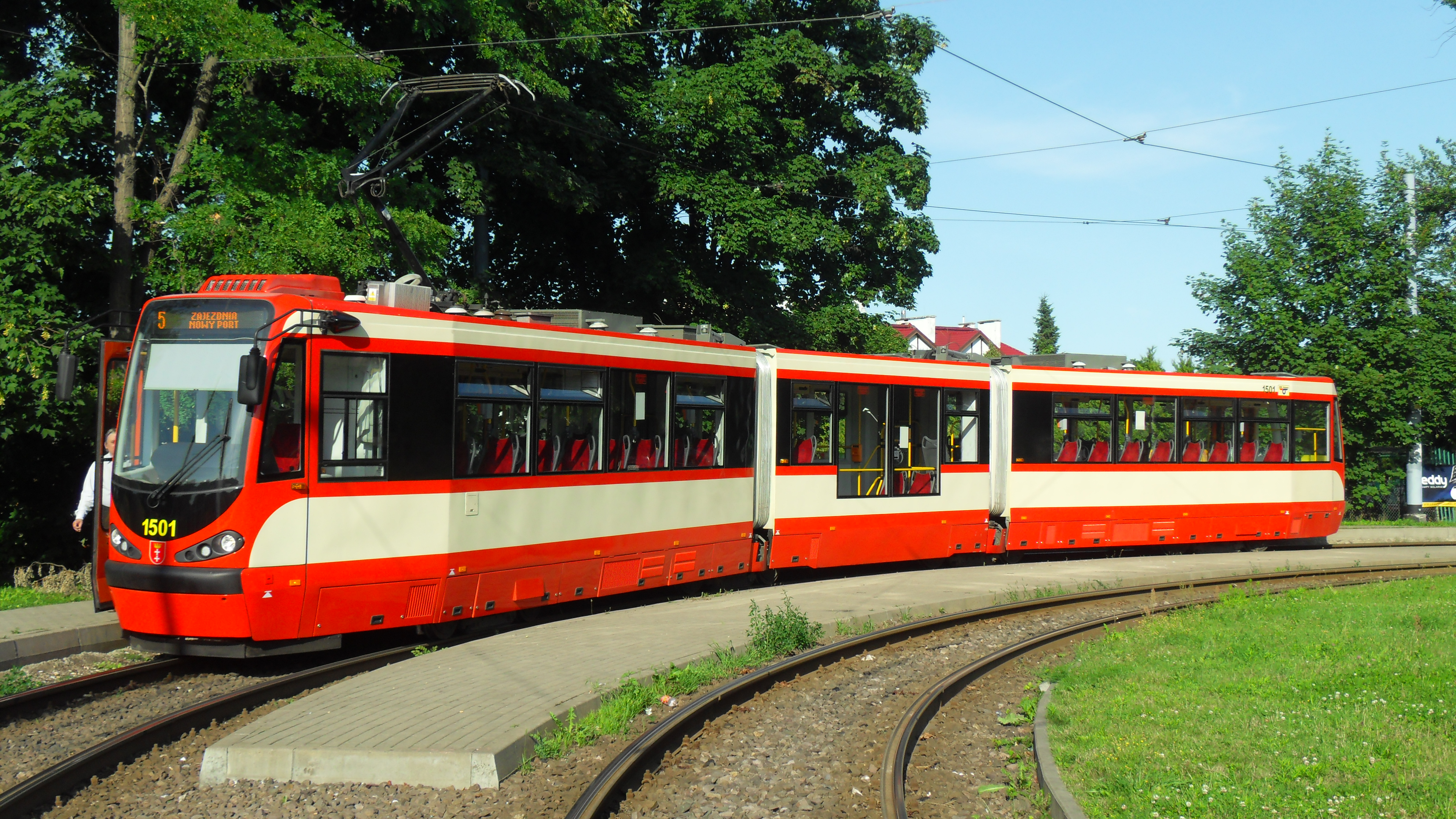
Konstal 114Na after modernization on Strzyża line

21/22 March 1997 marked the delivery of the first tram to Gdańsk, followed by the second in April. They were assigned serial numbers 1501 and 1502, respectively, and were directed to the Wrzeszcz depot to serve on line no. 12. Initially, due to numerous breakdowns, the trams spent more time in the depot than on the tracks. Thanks to the arrival of these vehicles, plans to build the line to Chełm were resumed. However, an expert analysis conducted at the Gdańsk University of Technology revealed that the 114Na trams, like all others in service at the time, were not suitable for operating on such a line profile. In 1999, Gdańsk purchased additional trams tailored to the needs of disabled people – the Konstal NGd99, which could safely operate on this line.

During the initial period of operation, these trams were characterized by a high incidence of electrical system failures, which prompted a modernization by the Municipal Transport Company in Łódź in 2000. It was decided to replace the IGBT transistors with GTO thyristors, which had proven successful in the 105N2k and 116N models. In the following years, the incidence of failures decreased, although it was not eliminated. During this overhaul, the trams were repainted in colors different from the standard Gdańsk livery.

On 10 January 2002, tram no. 1501 was involved in a minor collision. The tram stopped at Błędnik Street, then rolled into an NGd99 tram. As a result of the collision, the bumper of the 114Na was slightly damaged.

In 2008, tram no. 1502 was taken out of service for repairs. The downtime lasted 4 years and was accompanied by a minor modernization. Seats were replaced, and the livery was changed to something more akin to the colors used on Gdańsk buses. A similar scope of repairs was carried out on the second tram at the Wrzeszcz depot.

Due to an extensive overhaul at their own facilities, tram 1501 was sent for major repairs to Modertrans in February 2012. During this repair, the tram received front panels similar to those used in the Moderus Beta MF 01, sandboxes were built, seats were replaced, and LED displays were installed. Despite these upgrades, the vehicle cannot operate on the Chełm line due to insufficient power. After the modernization, the tram was designated as 114Na – MF 12. In March 2016, Gdańsk Municipal Transport Company announced a tender for the modernization of the second tram, similar in scope to the one carried out in 2012 by Modertrans. In early July, Modertrans won the tender as the sole bidder. The refurbished tram returned to Gdańsk in late July and early August. During the overhaul, the focus was on the interior and electronics, aiming to preserve as much of the original appearance as possible, as the carrier plans for the tram to become a historic vehicle in the future.

In December 2015, tram no. 1501 was named after the Polish writer Stanisława Przybyszewska.
