= Stadtbahnwagen M/N =

Mateo wisniewski

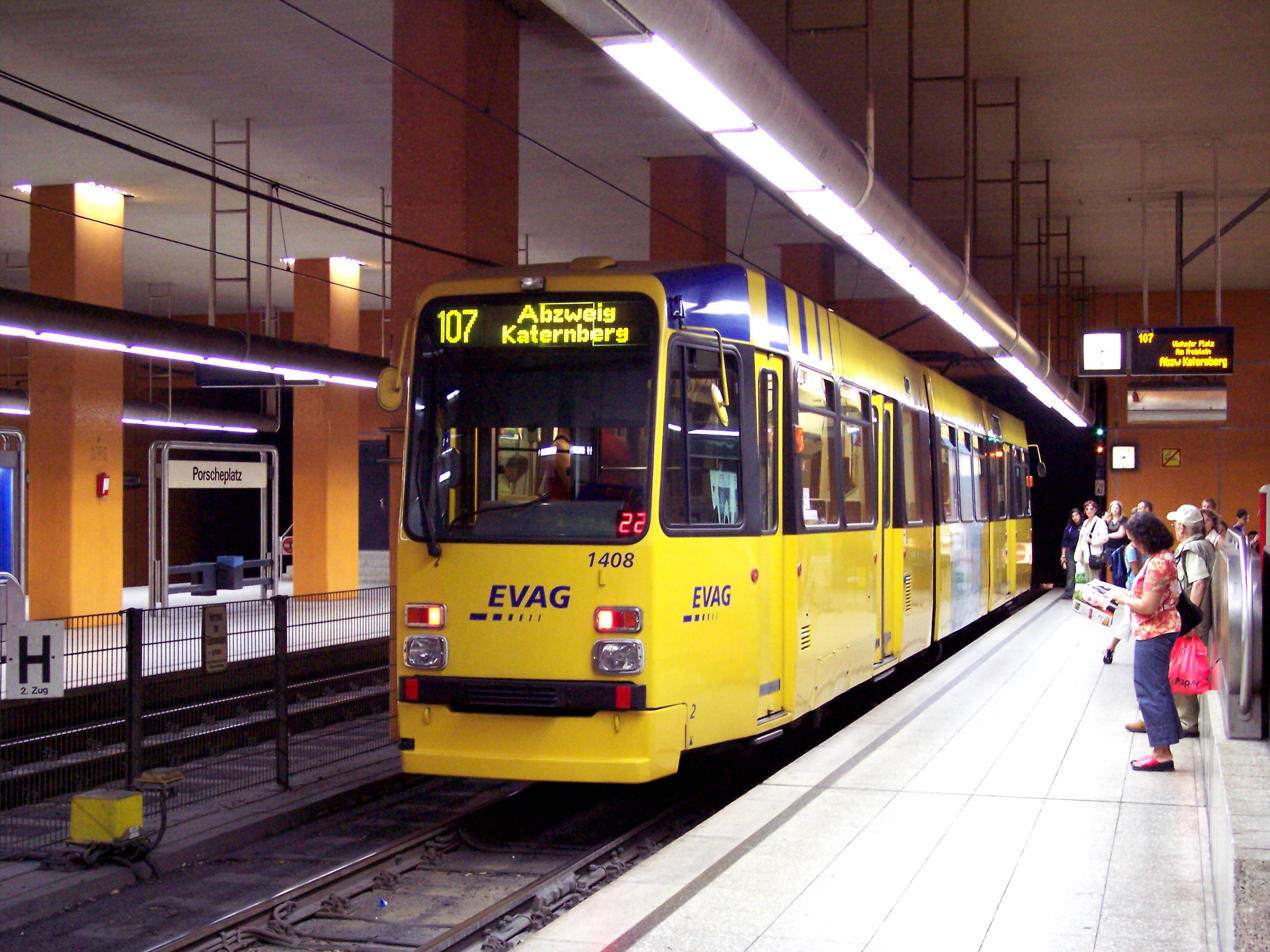
- M8C 1408 from Essen
- Stock type: Light Rail Vehicle/Tramcar
- Manufacturer: Duewag, MAN
- Constructed: 1975–1999
- Number built: 326

Specifications
- Train length: 20.4 m (66 ft 11 1/8 in) (M/N6); 26.6 m (87 ft 3 1/4 in) (M/N8)
- Width: 2.30 m (7 ft 6 1/2 in)
- Articulated sections: 2 (M/N6), 3 (M/N8)
- Power supply: 600V

The Stadtbahnwagen Typ M/N (translation Type "M/N" Light Rail Vehicle) is a light rail vehicle used by several Stadtbahn and tram networks in Germany and Austria plus second hand in Poland, Romania and Turkey. It was mainly developed by Düsseldorf-based Duewag, who also built most of the vehicles. As the type evolved over two decades of production, some vehicles have little more in common than their outer dimensions and the basic configuration of a two or thee-part vehicle on three or four bogies with both outer ones powered.

== History ==
Development started when the transport authorities from Bochum, Essen and Mülheim asked Duewag to develop a standardised vehicle for their meter gauge tram networks, the initiative was soon followed by Bielefeld and Krefeld. Initially the tramcar was designated Stadtbahnwagen R (R = Ruhr), but the definitive name became Stadtbahn M (M = Meterspur, meaning "meter gauge"). In 1976, the Stadtbahnwagen N (N = Normalspur, meaning "standard gauge") was introduced in Nuremberg, followed by a chopper-controlled version for Dortmund in 1978.

== Subtypes ==
Different variants are usually referred to by a combination of their gauge, number of axles and a letter denoting the motor type.

M/N 6/8 S	SIMATIC-Schaltwerksteuerung (SIMATIC-regulated camshaft control)
M/N 6/8 C	Chopper control
M/N 6/8 D	Drehstromantrieb (three-phase motors)

== See also ==
- Moderus Beta (modernized tram)
