= Pesa 611M =

Diesel railcar manufactured by Pesa for Russian Railways

611M
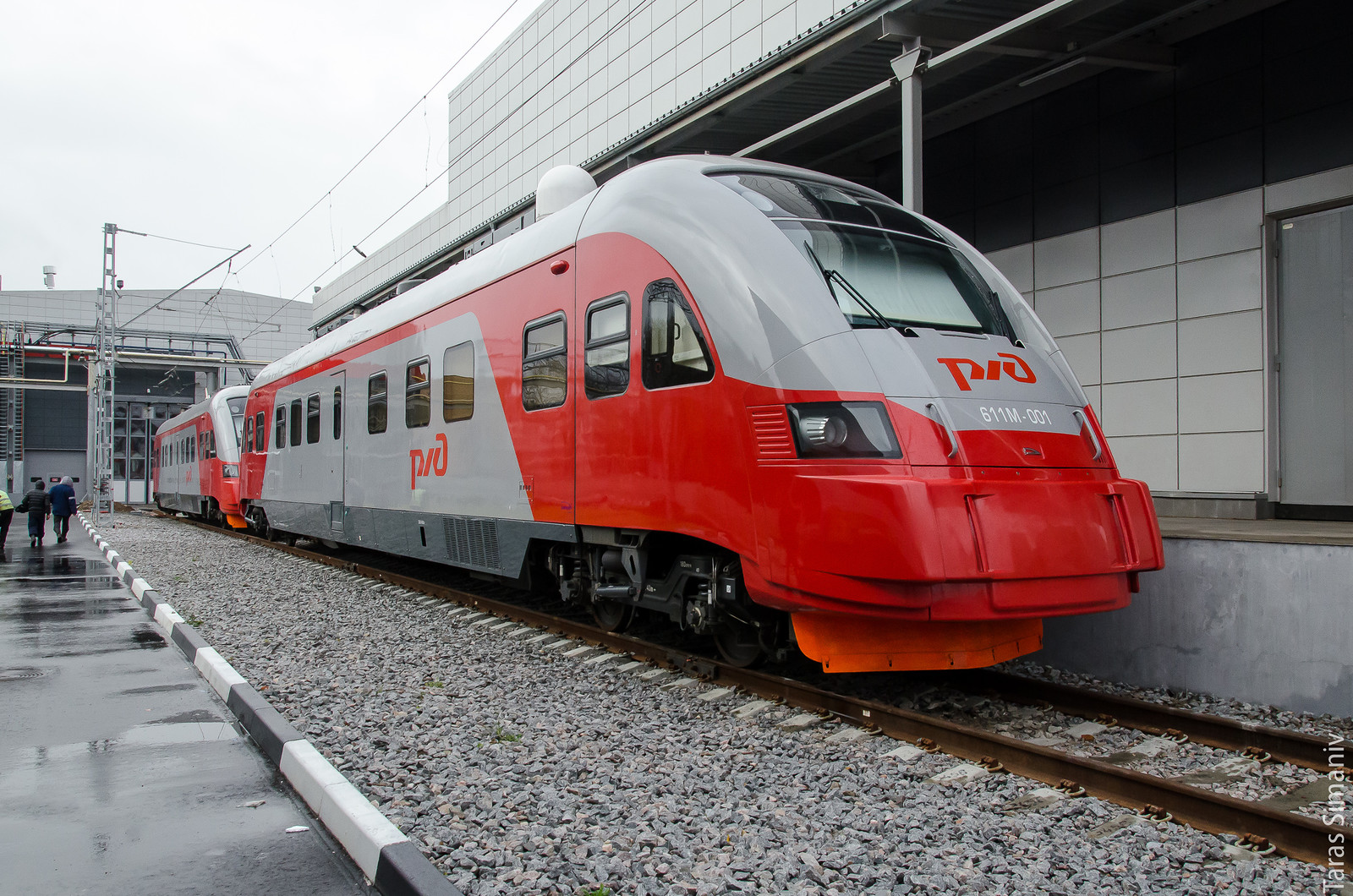
- Two 611M railcars at one of Moscow's stations
- Stock type: diesel multiple unit
- Manufacturer: Pesa
- Assembly: Bydgoszcz, Poland
- Constructed: 2013
- Number built: 2
- Capacity: 20

Specifications
- Train length: 27,350 mm (1,077 in)
- Width: 3,000 mm (120 in)
- Height: 4,860 mm (191 in)
- Maximum speed: 180 km/h (112 mph)
- Weight: 66 t (146,000 lb)
- Engine type: MTU 6H 1800 R83 (diesel)

Pesa 611M is a broad-gauge diesel railcar manufactured by Pesa in Bydgoszcz. Two units were produced for Russian Railways and delivered in 2013.

On 15 October 2013, one of the vehicles reached a speed of 201 km/h on the Moscow–Saint Petersburg route, making it the fastest diesel rail vehicle of Polish production.

== History ==
=== Origins ===
In 2001, Pesa began producing brand-new rail vehicles. The first was the 214M, a standard-gauge diesel railcar intended for the Polish market. In 2004, Pesa started fulfilling orders for broad-gauge rail vehicles. The initial orders were for Ukrainian Railways, including the 610M inspection railcar designed for the General Director of Ukrainian Railways and the 620M units intended for regular passenger service.

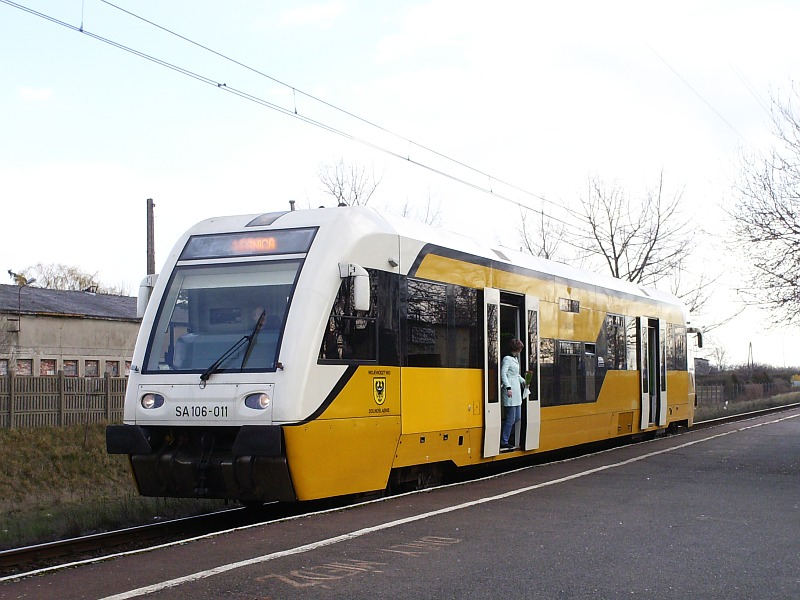
214M

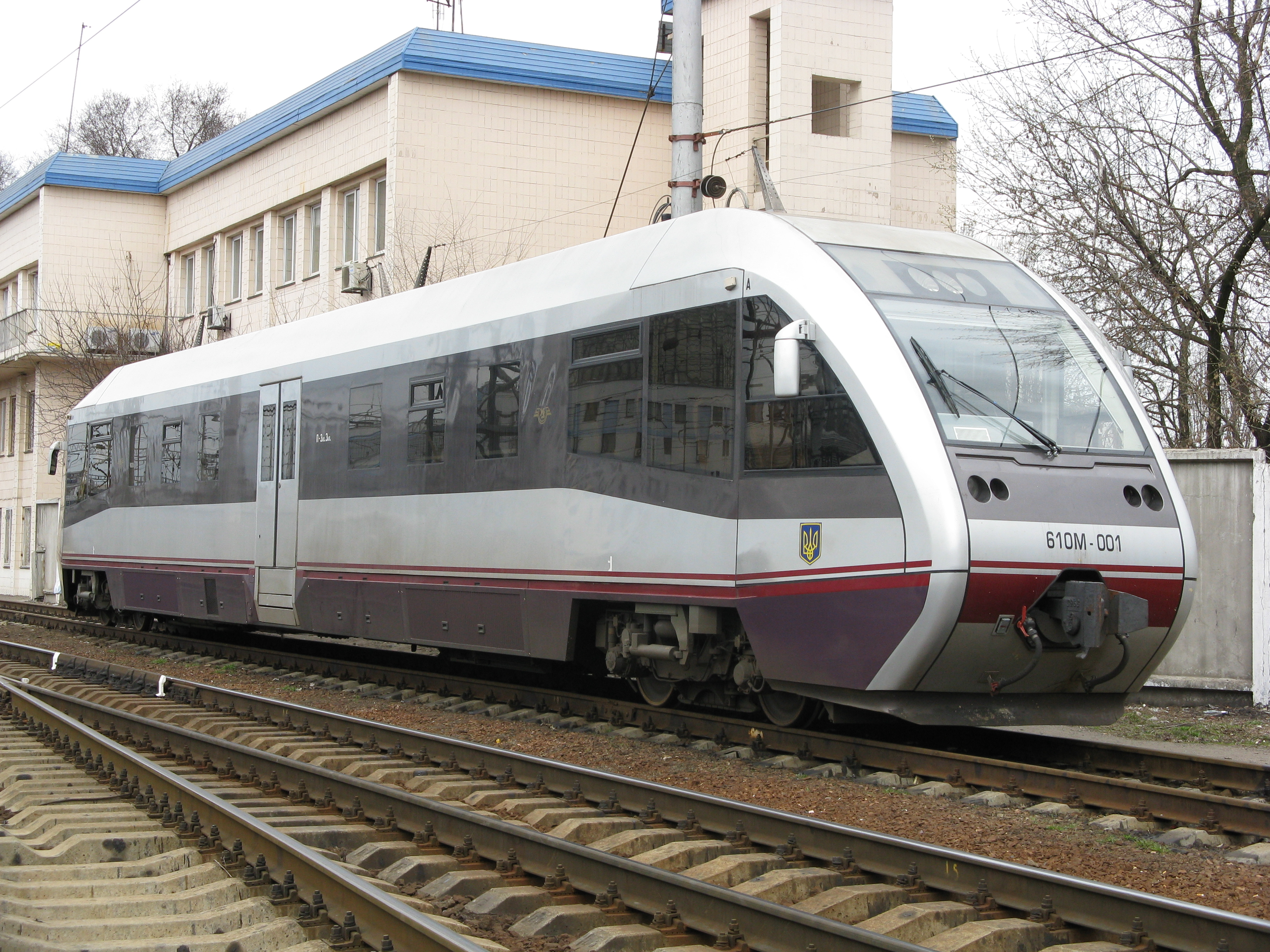
610M

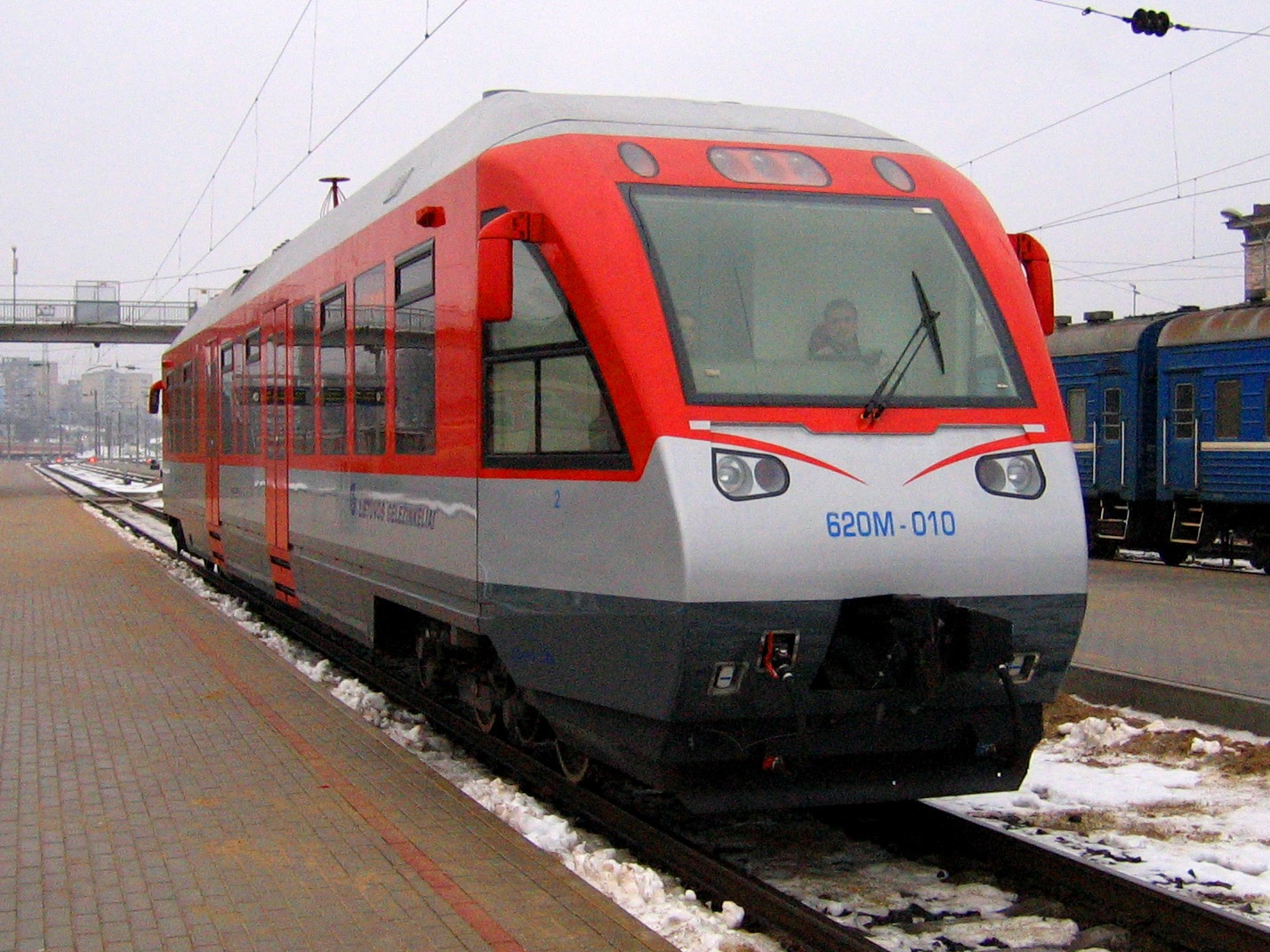
620M

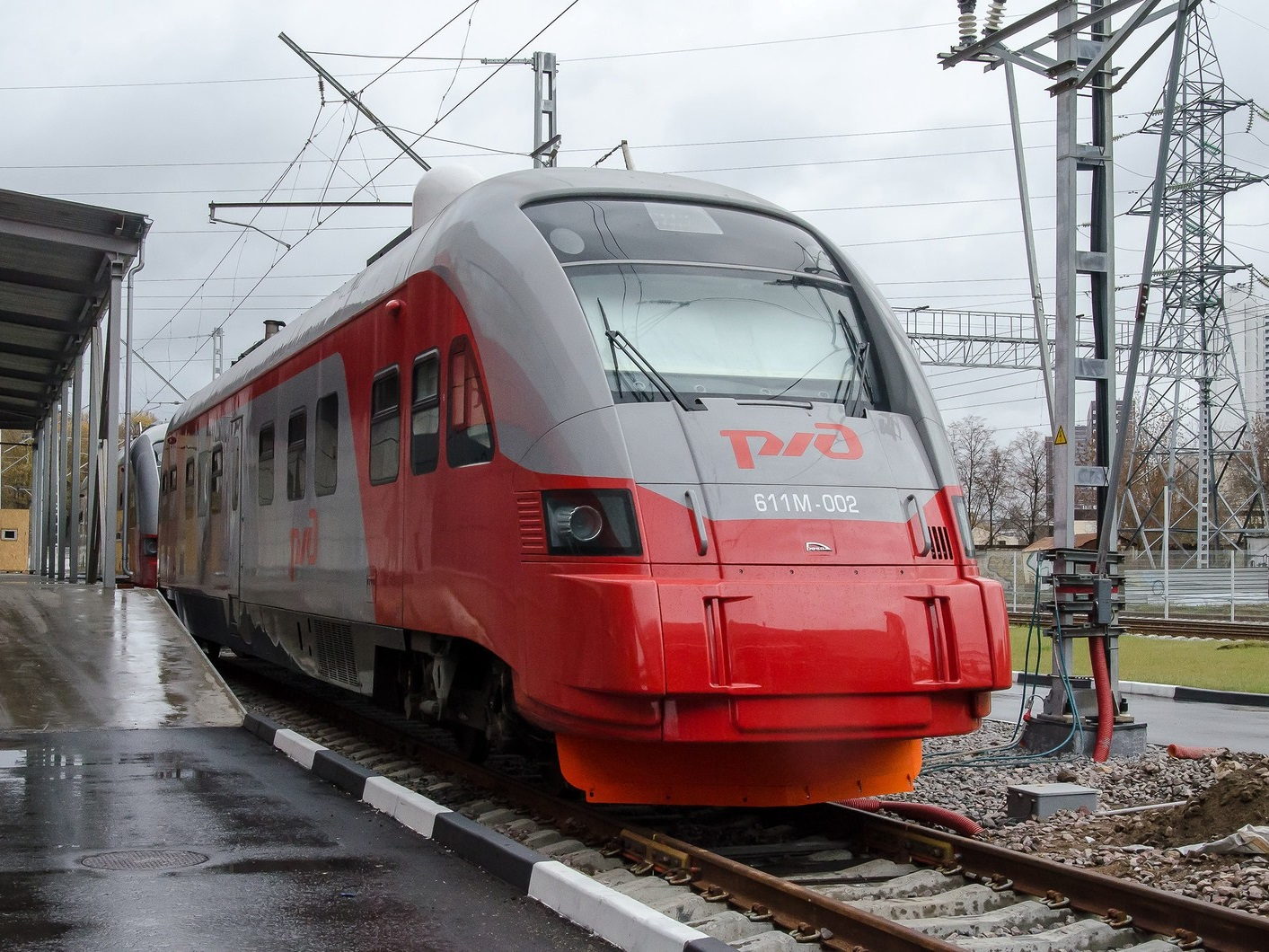
611M

=== Order fulfillment ===
On 12 October 2011, during the 9th Trako trade fair in Gdańsk, representatives from Pesa and Russian Railways signed an agreement for the production and delivery of two inspection vehicles, with an option for additional orders. The agreement stipulated that the trains would enter service before the 2014 Winter Olympics in Sochi.

By the end of June 2013, the first inspection railcar, 611M-001, was completed and began test runs on the Bydgoszcz–Inowrocław route in early July. In the second half of July, the vehicle was transported to Russia, where testing commenced on 29 July 2013 at the Research and Development Institute of Railway Transport's test track in Shcherbinka.

By early August 2013, the second railcar, 611M-002, was completed. On 15 October 2013, it reached a speed of 201 km/h on the Moscow–Saint Petersburg route, setting a record for the fastest diesel rail vehicle of Polish production.

== Construction ==
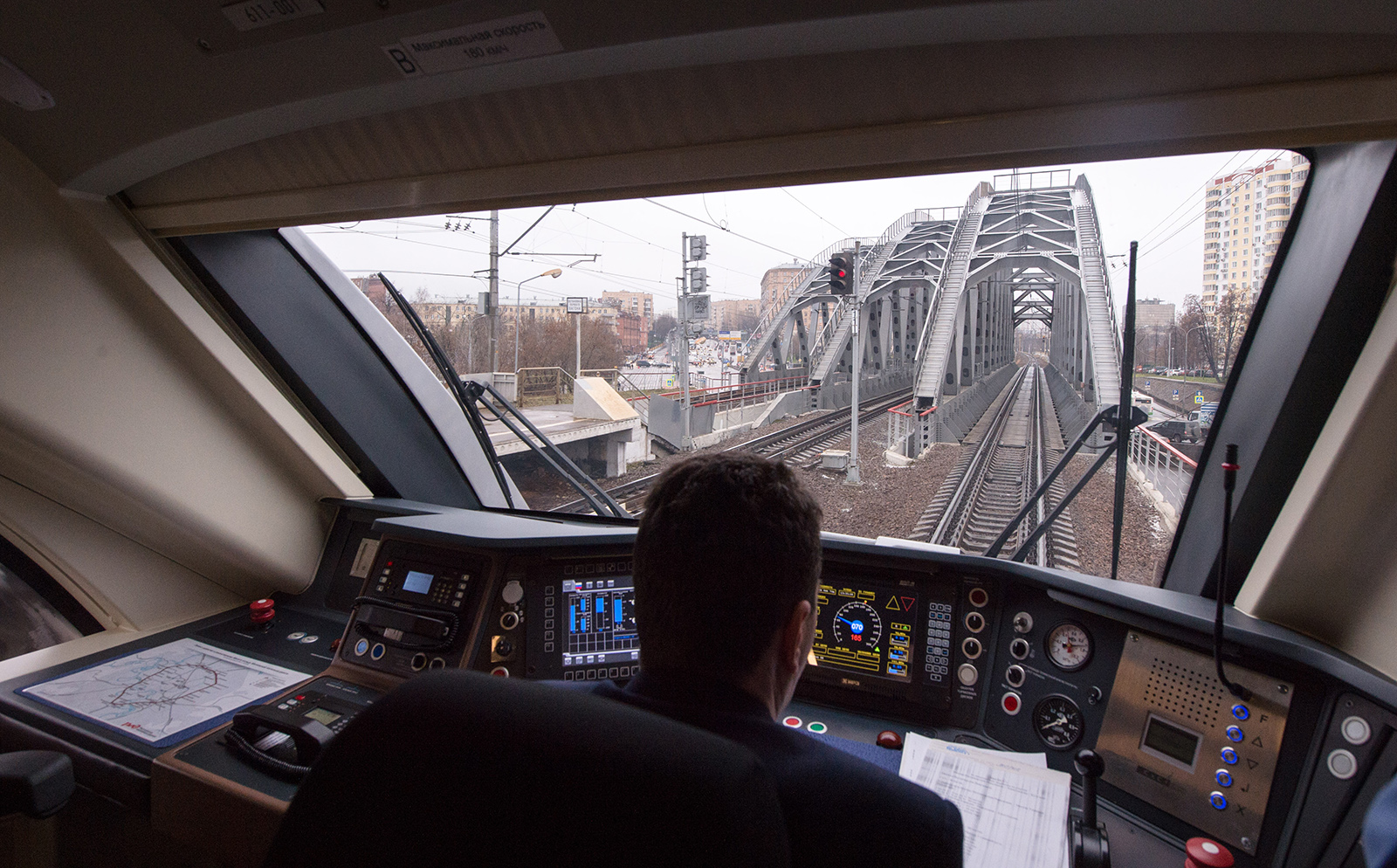
Driver's cabin

The 611M railcar is an inspection vehicle designed for railways with a track gauge of 1,520 mm, building upon the 610M railcar model used by Ukrainian Railways.

This railcar features two powered bogies and driver's cabins at both ends, designed for single-operator control with additional seating for an assistant driver and an inspector.

On both sides of the vehicle, there are electrically operated single-leaf sliding doors. Automatically extending steps allow for boarding and alighting from platforms of varying heights. The vehicle is air-conditioned and equipped with double-glazed windows that provide high thermal and acoustic insulation, allowing for operation in temperatures ranging from -40°C to +40°C.

The interior of the vehicle is divided into several sections: a conference room with multimedia equipment, a work area, a sleeping section, and a fully equipped kitchen for meal preparation. The railcar also includes a shower cabin and a closed-system toilet.

The vehicle is equipped with communication systems that support various standards, including satellite communication, railway telephone (VHF 160 MHz, medium wave 2 MHz, GSM-R, TETRA), and mobile telephony (GSM/GPRS/EDGE/UMTS/LTE). Additionally, the vehicle is equipped with digital and industrial television systems.
