= Pesa 630M =

Diesel multiple unit produced by Pesa

630M
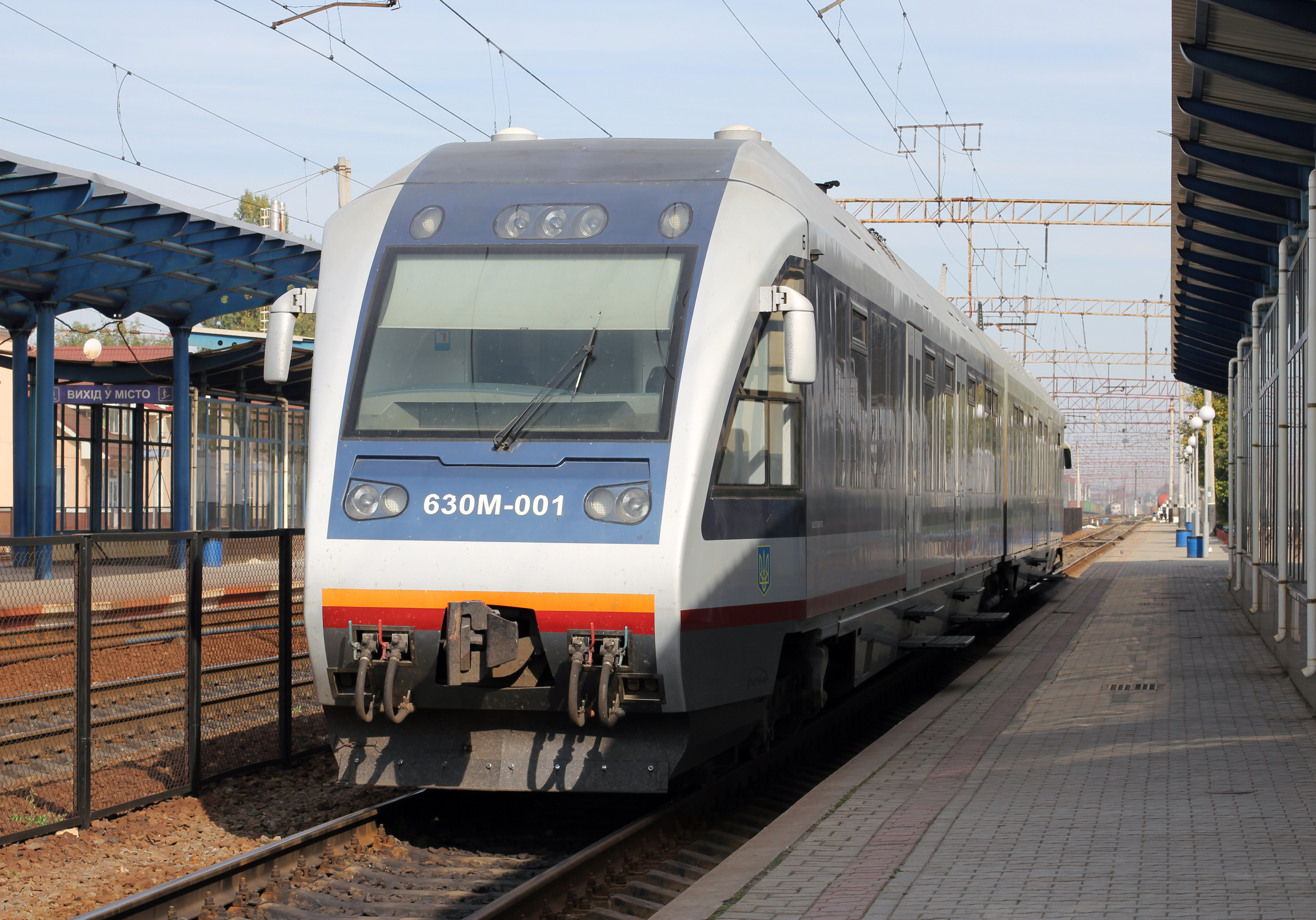
- 630M-001
- Stock type: diesel multiple unit
- Manufacturer: Pesa
- Assembly: Bydgoszcz, Poland
- Constructed: 2011–2013
- Number built: 6

Specifications
- Train length: 51,600 mm (2,030 in)
- Width: 3,000 mm (120 in)
- Maximum speed: 140 km/h (87 mph)
- AAR wheel arrangement: B'2'+2'B'

Pesa 630M is a two-car, broad-gauge diesel multiple unit produced by Pesa. Six units are currently in service, operated by Ukrainian Railways (2 units), Kazakhstan Temir Joly (1 unit), and Lithuanian Railways (3 units).

== History ==
After several years of operating Pesa-built diesel railcars of types 610M and 620M, Ukrainian Railways decided to purchase two-car units from the same manufacturer. The prototype appeared on the tracks in 2011 and was tested in Żmigród from 23 to 27 May. The vehicles traveled under their own power to the Polish-Ukrainian border (Dorohusk-Jagodzin rail border crossing), where their bogie axles were replaced with broad-gauge ones.

Additional units were ordered by Kazakhstan (1 unit) and Lithuania (3 units). Lithuanian Railways, like Ukrainian Railways, had already been operating smaller 620M railcars.

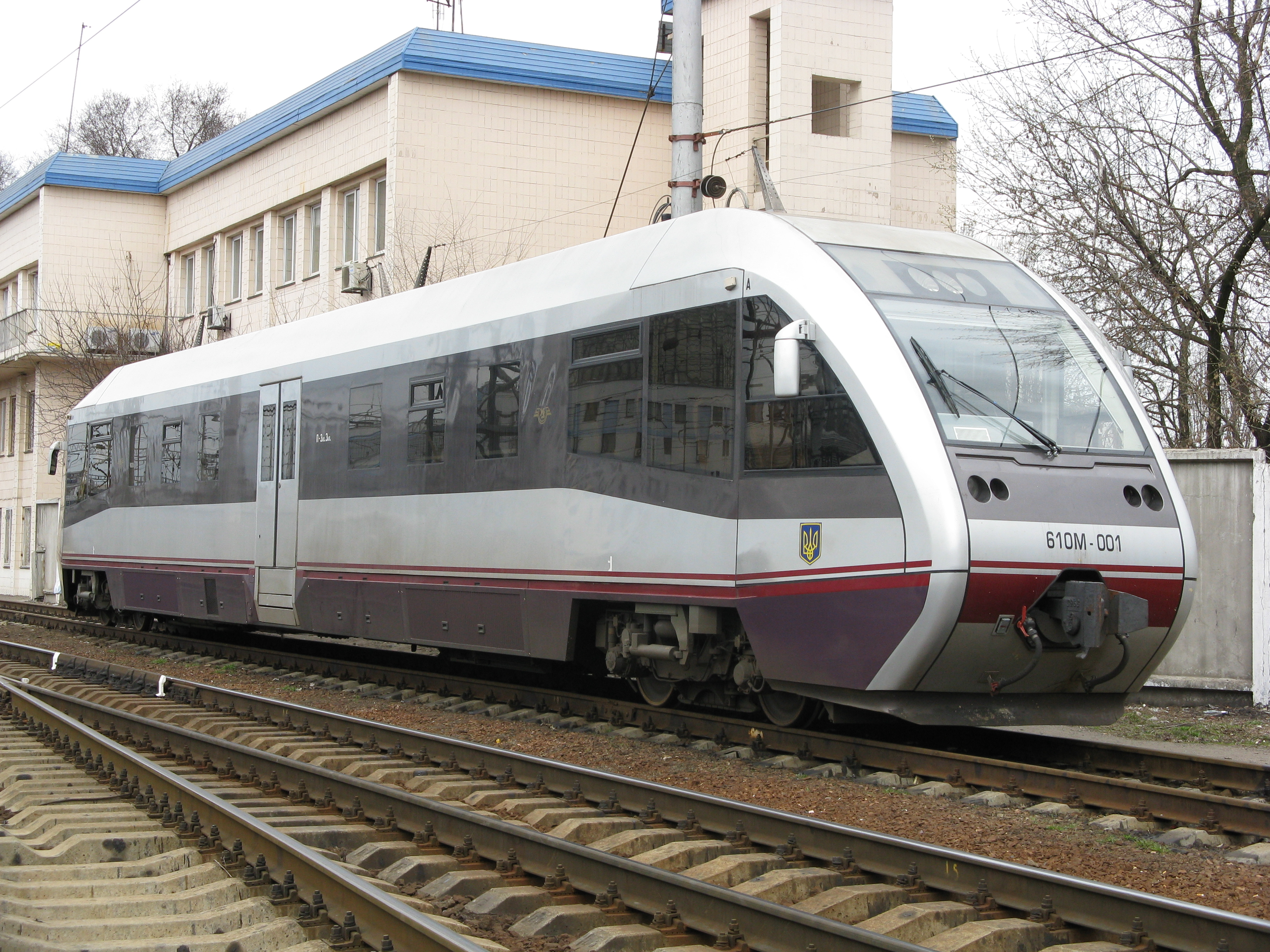
610M

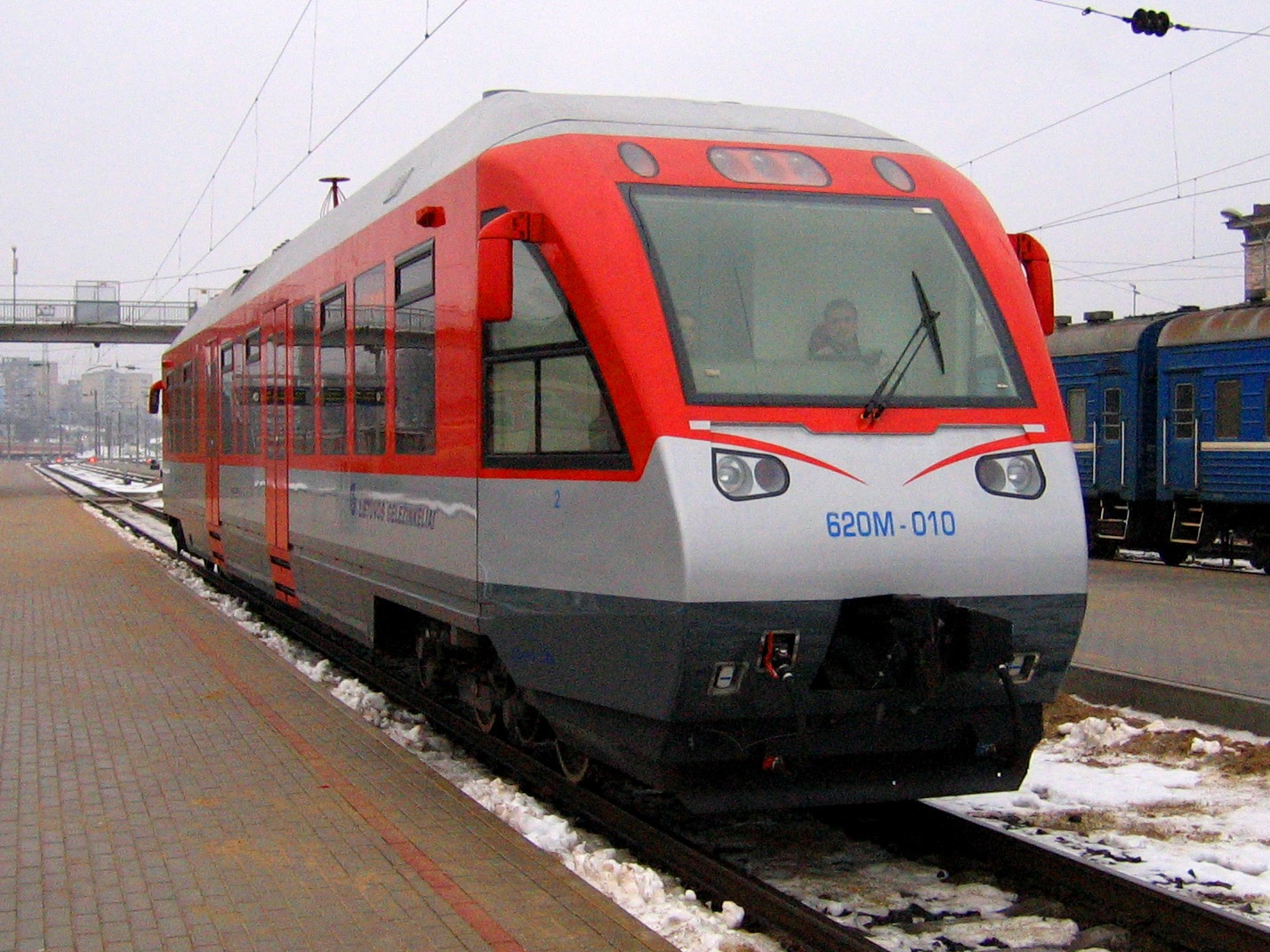
620M

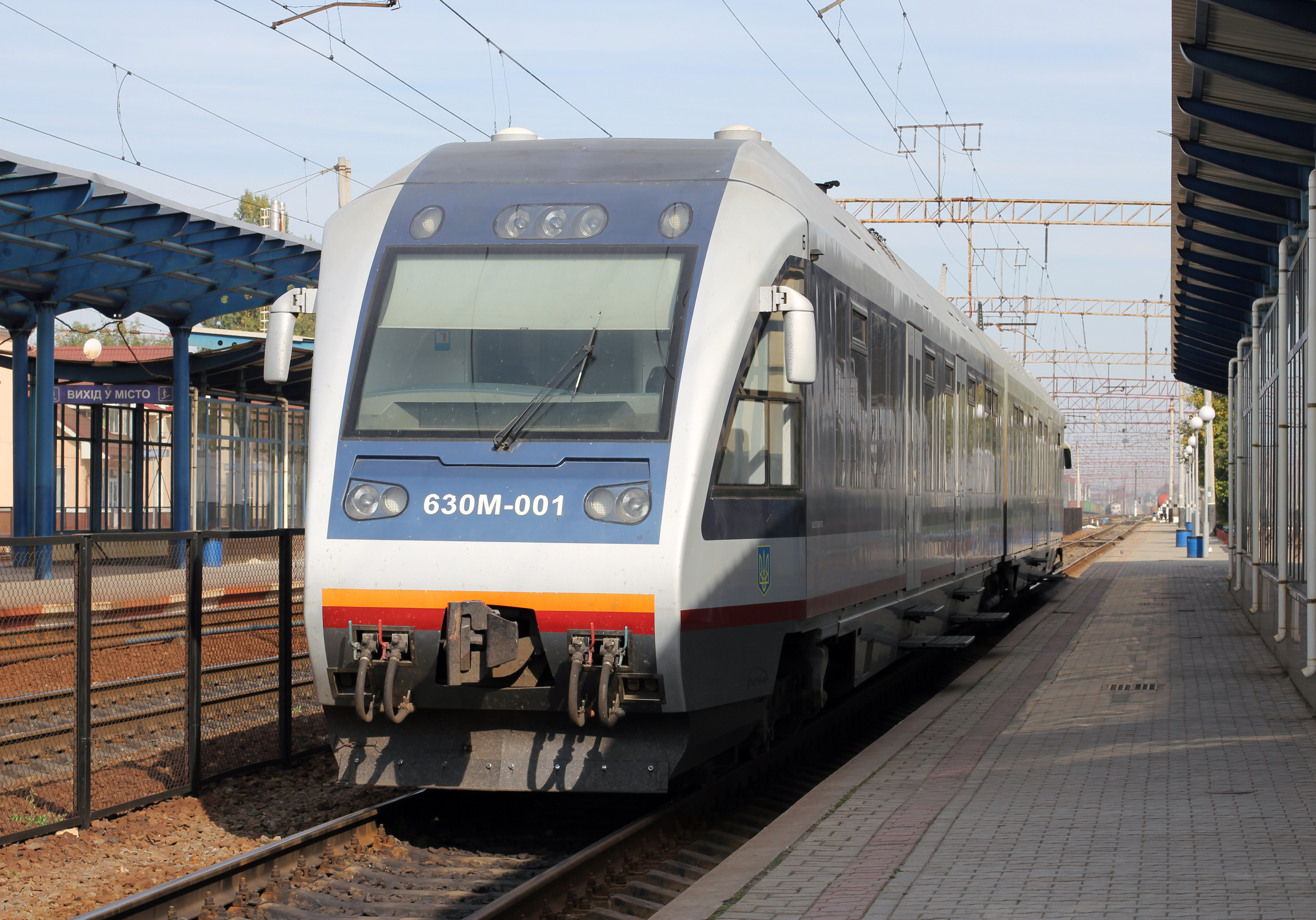
630M

== Construction ==
The 630M cars are directly derived from the Pesa 620M diesel railcars, with modifications such as replacing one driver’s cabin with additional passenger space and adding an inter-car passageway. The design allows for possible expansion to a three- or four-car diesel multiple unit.

These vehicles are intended for suburban transport and are equipped with air conditioning and CCTV. The version for Kazakhstan is adapted for passengers with reduced mobility. A notable difference from the Ukrainian Railways models is the updated front design, along with enhanced accessibility features – two lifts and a specially equipped toilet. The units ordered by Lithuanian Railways also include a higher maximum speed and a distinct front design compared to previous models.

Unit number	Height	Engine type	Number and power of engines	Transmission	Maximum operating speed	Number of seats	Sources
001–002	4,222 mm	MAN D2876LUE623	2×385 kW	Voith hydrodynamic Tr211re4	120 km/h	192	
003	4,500 mm	MAN	2×380 kW	Voith hydraulic	120 km/h	175 / 192	
004–006	–	MAN D2876LUE623	2×385 kW	Voith hydrodynamic Tr211re4	140 km/h	140	

== Operation ==
Country	Operator	Number delivered	Designation	Version	Delivery years	Sources
Ukraine	Ukrainian Railways	2	630M-001 ÷ 002		2011	
Kazakhstan	Kazakhstan Temir Joly	1	630M-003	630McI	2012	
Lithuania	Lithuanian Railways	3	630M-004 ÷ 006		2013	

=== Ukraine ===
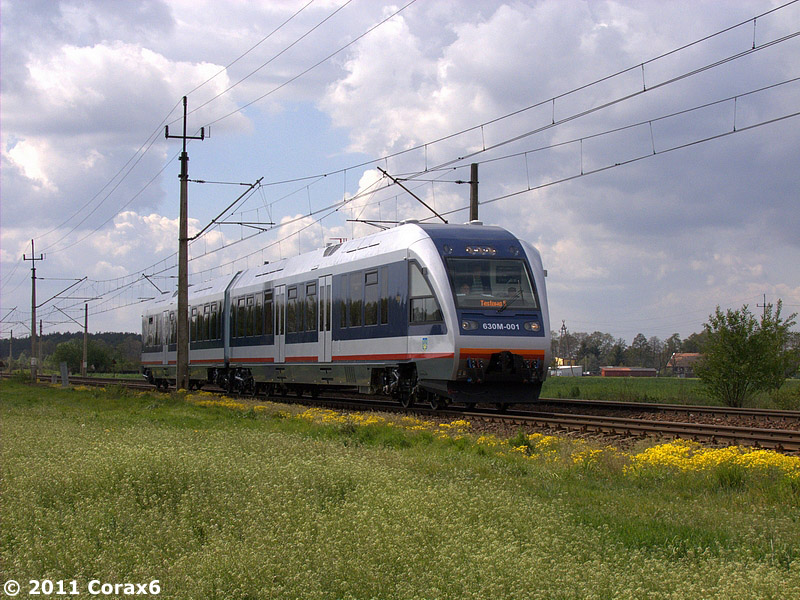
First 630M belonging to Ukrainian Railways

In Ukraine, the inauguration ceremony for 630M-001 took place on 24 June 2011 at the station in Vinnytsia, with the second unit delivered later. Both vehicles were intended for services connecting Hrechany with Vinnytsia and Shepetivka in the South-Western Railway Directorate. The units were stationed at the Hrechany depot. On 16 February 2017, one of the units was assigned to operate the route from Ivano-Frankivsk to Rakhiv. On June 12, one of the vehicles was also utilized for a new international service between Kovel and Chełm.

=== Kazakhstan ===
In January 2012, a contract was signed for the delivery of one 630M to Kazakhstan Temir Joly. The vehicle was delivered to Kazakhstan on July 1. It was handed over to the operator on July 4, with a ceremony held the following day. The 630M-003 was delivered to Kazakhstan for operation on the route between Turkistan and Shymkent. Regular services commenced on 6 July 2012. By the end of October 2012, the Kazakh unit was operating three times a week, completing 51 pairs of trips and covering a total distance of 22,184 kilometers.

=== Lithuania ===
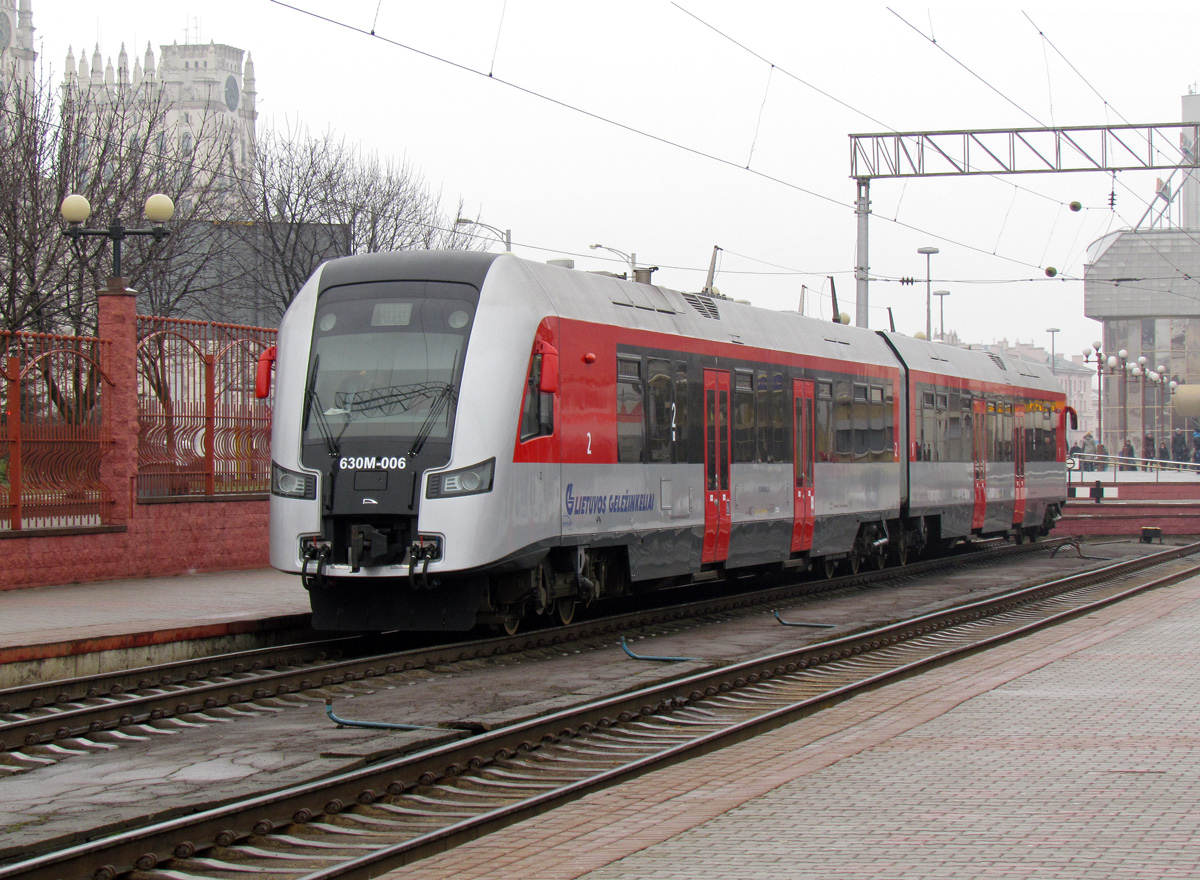
Lithuanian 630M

On 18 September 2012, Pesa signed a contract with Lithuanian Railways for the delivery of three 630M units. The first vehicle arrived in Lithuania on 23 April 2013, with deliveries expected to conclude in December 2013. Two vehicles were purchased for services on the route from Vilnius to Minsk, while the third was intended for domestic services. A new connection between the capitals of Lithuania and Belarus, operated by the 630M, was launched on 26 May 2013. The trains cover the route faster than before, partly due to streamlined customs procedures. By mid-November, the last – third – unit was delivered. On 3 January 2014, one of the 630M units began operating the route from Vilnius to Šiauliai.
