= Pesa (company) =

Polish railway vehicle manufacturer

Coordinates: 53°08′00″N 17°59′47″E

PESA Bydgoszcz S.A.
- Type: Joint-stock company
- Industry: Rail vehicle manufacturing
- Predecessor: The Repair Workshop of the Prussian Eastern Railway (until 1920), ZNTK Bydgoszcz (Bydgoszcz Rolling Stock Repair Shops) (until 2001)
- Founded: 1851
- Headquarters: Bydgoszcz, Poland
- Key people: Krzysztof Zdziarski (President of the Management Board)
- Products: Locomotives; Intercity and commuter trains Trams
- Owner: Polish Development Fund (PFR)
- Number of employees: ~4,000 (2025)
- Subsidiaries: Pesa Mińsk Mazowiecki
- Website: pesa.pl/en/

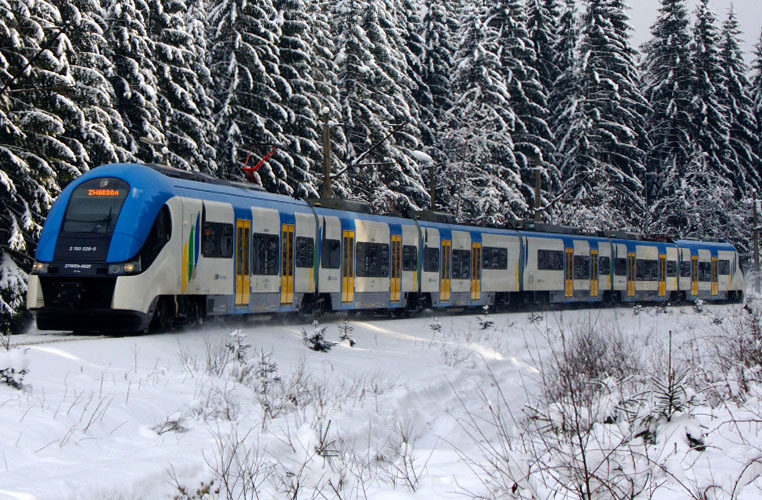
Pesa Elf of Silesian Railways

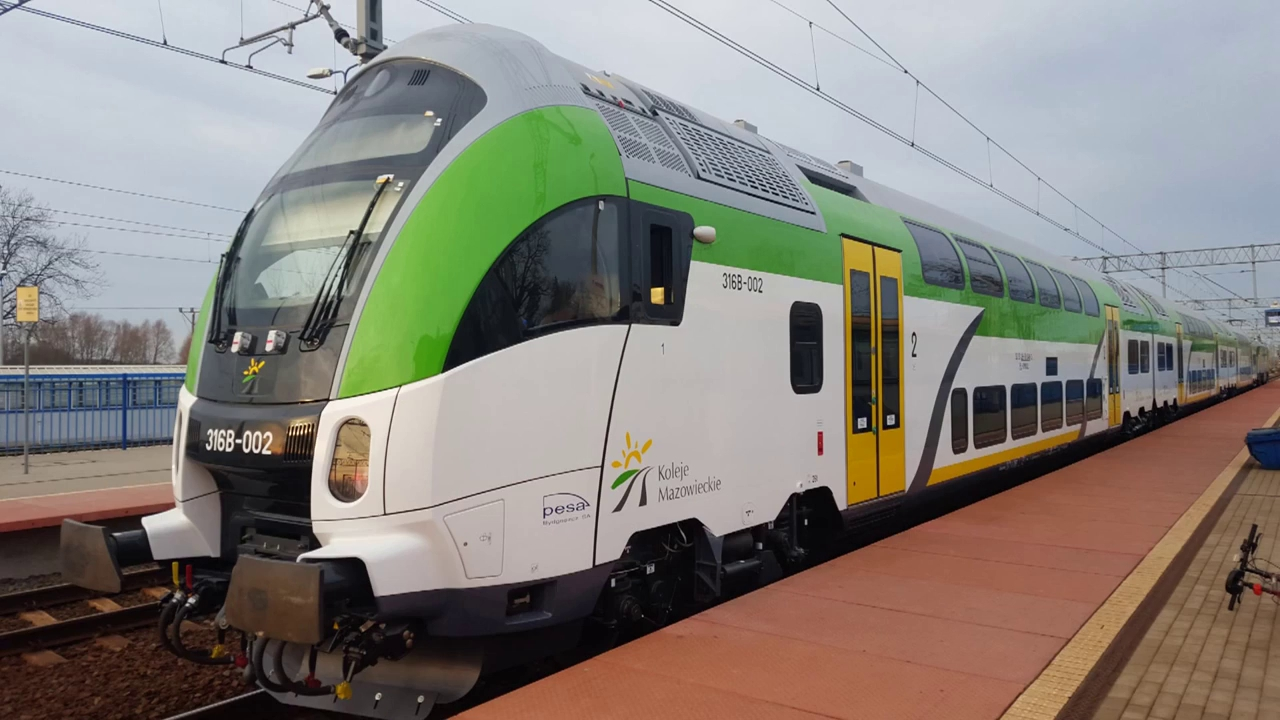
Pesa Sundeck of Masovian Railways

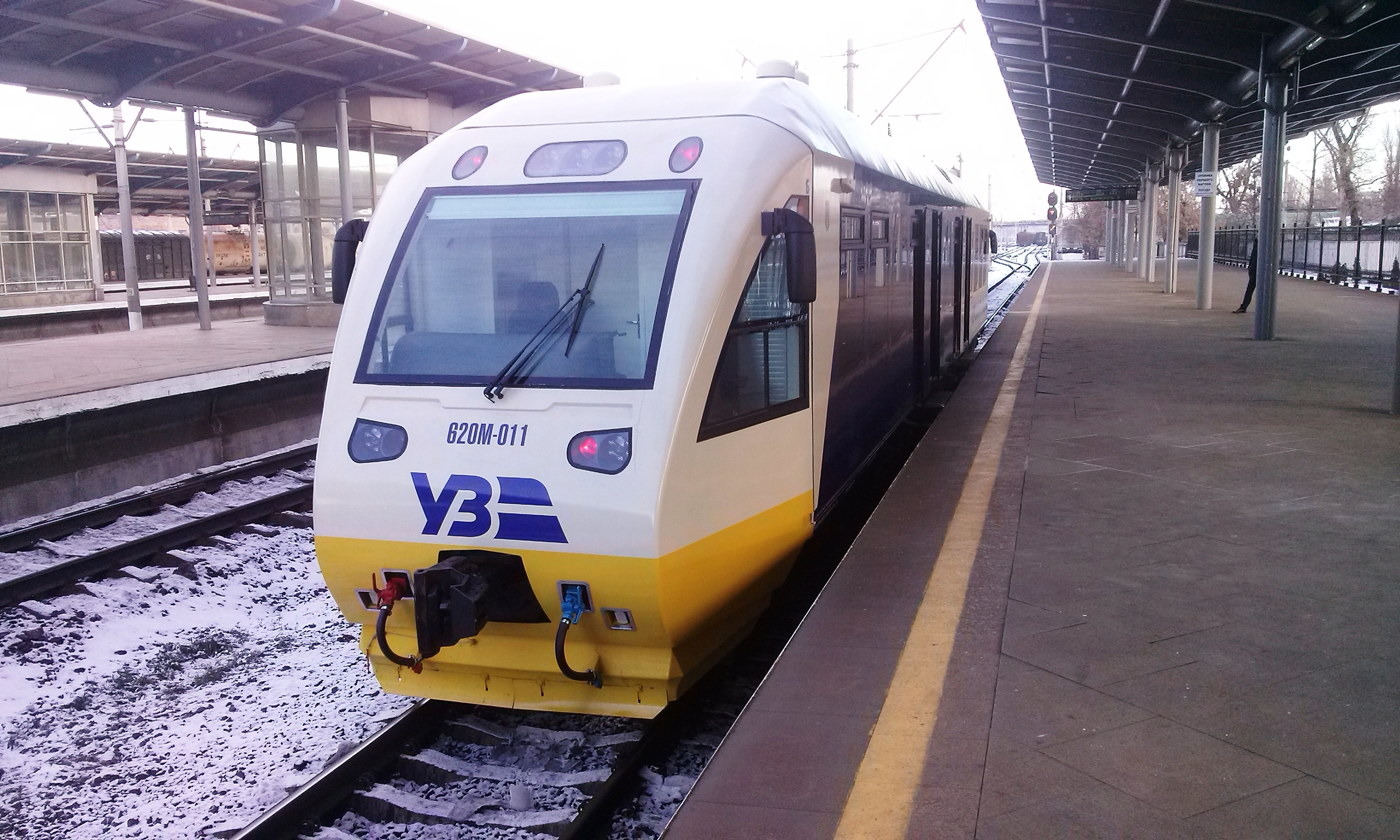
Pesa 620M used on Kyiv Boryspil Express

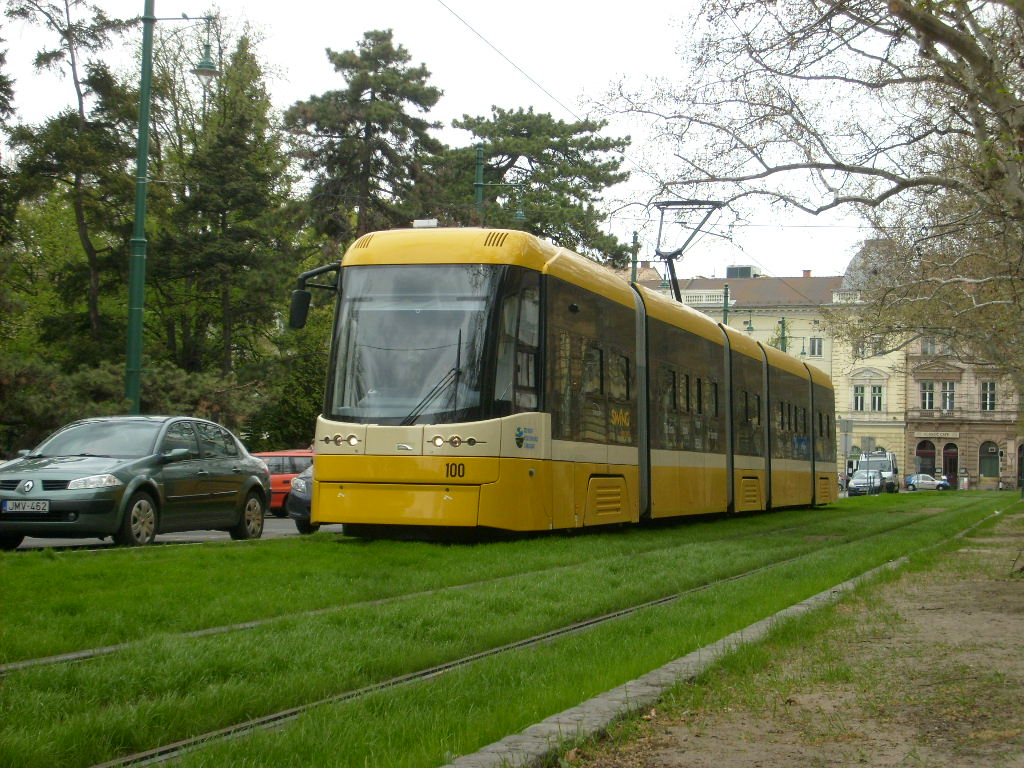
Pesa Swing in Szeged, Hungary

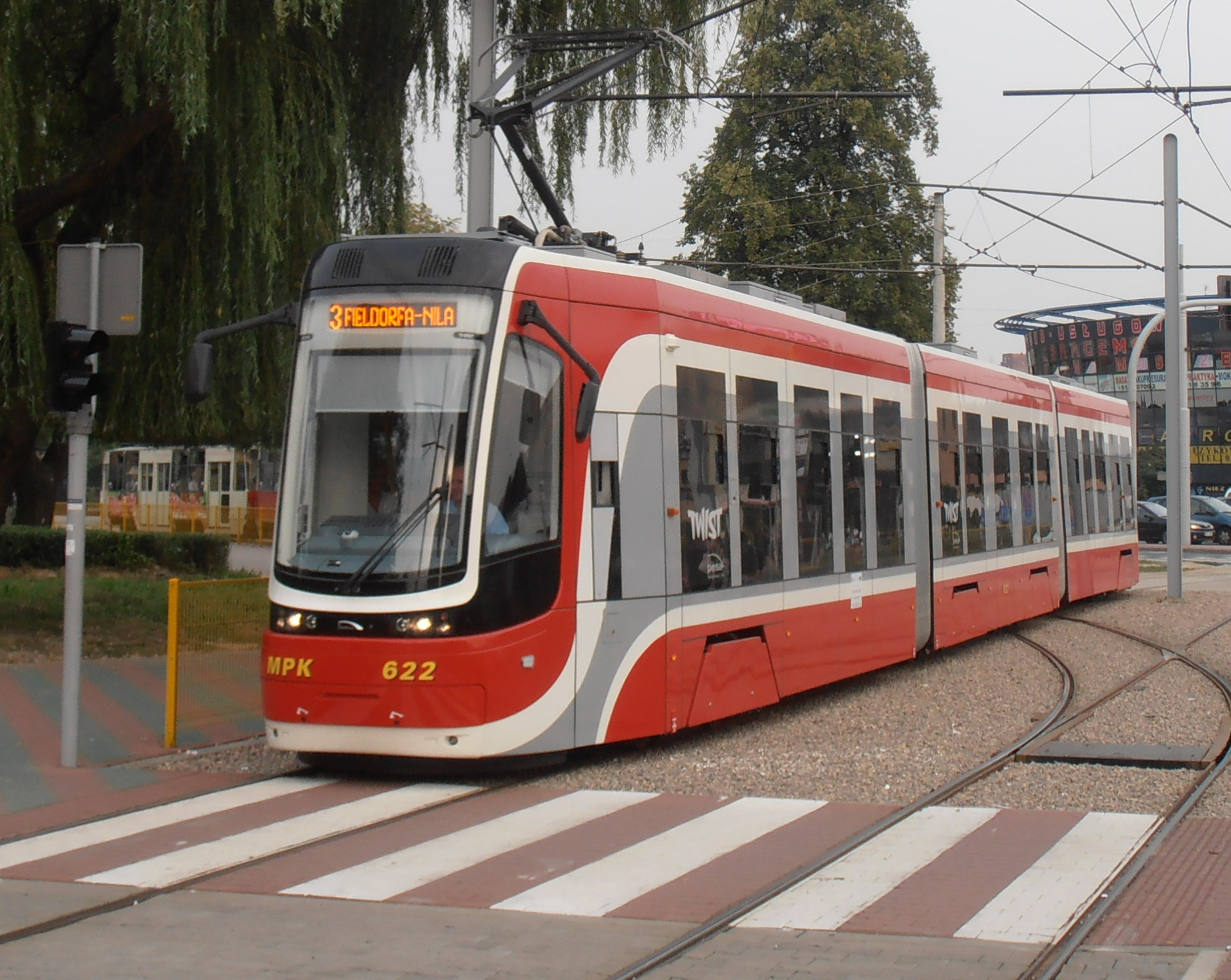
Pesa Twist in Częstochowa, Poland

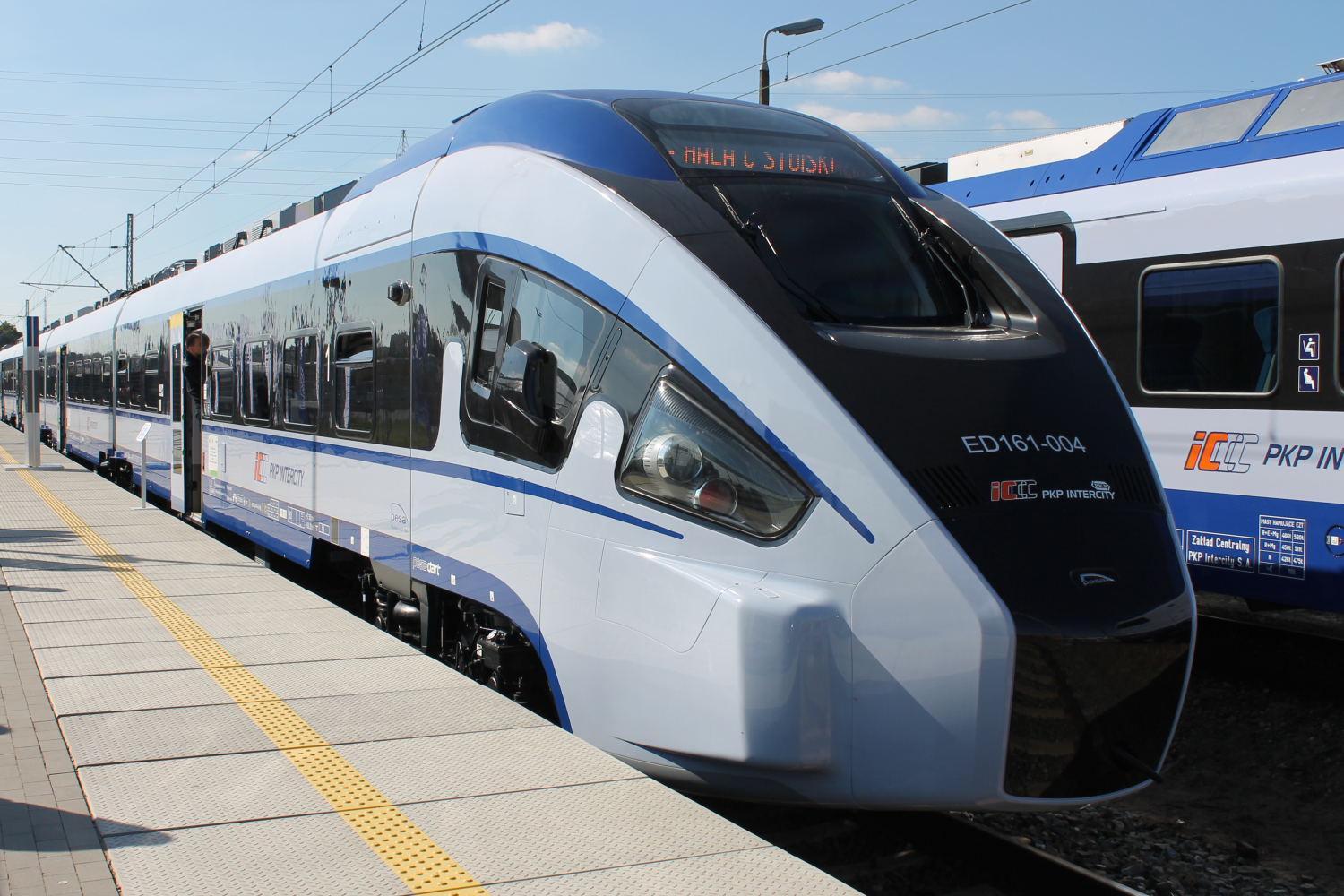
Pesa Dart for PKP Intercity

Pesa Bydgoszcz SA, (Polish: Pojazdy Szynowe Pesa Bydgoszcz) trading as Pesa is a Polish rolling stock manufacturer based in Bydgoszcz, Poland. The name 'Pesa' derives from the initials PS which stand for Pojazdy Szynowe, 'railway vehicles' in Polish. Pesa is a successor to the Bydgoszcz repair shops of PKP Polskie Koleje Państwowe, Polish State Railways. From the 1950s until 1998 the repair shops operated under the name ZNTK Bydgoszcz, Zakłady Naprawcze Taboru Kolejowego, 'Repair Shop for Railway Rolling Stock' in Bydgoszcz.

For most of its history the Bydgoszcz shop overhauled and repaired steam locomotives and freight cars. After the collapse in 1989 of the Communist regime in Poland the ZNTK Bydgoszcz repair shop was spun off in 1991 as an independent company. This led to a re-thinking of the firm's activities, and in 2001 the company was renamed Pojazdy Szynowe Pesa Spółka Akcyjna Holding (its present name) and its activities were re-oriented away from repair to the construction of new railway rolling stock.

This transformation of Pesa's activities has been very successful. Since 2001 Pesa has secured contracts to supply new Light rail vehicles (LRVs, trams) to Warsaw, Gdańsk and other cities in Poland, Hungary, Germany and Kazakhstan; and both electric and diesel multiple unit trains (EMUs and DMUs) to operators in Poland, Italy, Kazakhstan and Germany. Pesa's most noteworthy contracts are: (1) a May 29, 2009, contract worth 1.5bn złoty ($460 million) for 186 trams for Warsaw, Poland to replace 40 percent of that city's fleet, and (2) on September 19, 2012, Pesa signed two framework agreements with Deutsche Bahn (DB) to supply up to 470 Diesel multiple unit (DMU) trains for regional and local services, with a total value of up to €1.2bn ($1.5 billion).

== History ==
=== 19th century: the Prussian era ===
Before the re-establishment of Poland as a sovereign state in 1918, the city of Bydgoszcz, whose German name is Bromberg, was part of Prussia.

The Bydgoszcz workshop was founded in 1851 as the 'Repair Workshop of the Prussian Eastern Railway' (Reparaturbetrieb der östlichen Eisenbahn). It was located near the Bydgoszcz Główna railway station, opposite the original station which was built in that same year. Originally it comprised a locomotive depot and a smithy. By 1855 an administration building was added, and in 1856 a locomotive repair shed. Further enlargement and rebuilding of the repair shop of the Prussian Eastern Railway took place in the 1860s, 1870s and 1880s. During this period a new smithy was built, a new locomotive repair shed with 44 bays, a railcar repair shed, facilities for sheet metal repair, a paint shop, a metalwork shop as well as facilities for repair of tenders and construction of switches. In 1867 a tunnel leading from the present Zygmunt August Street to the repair shops, and running under the railway tracks, was put into service.

As the workshop developed, it occupied an increasing area. Originally, the area was only 1 hectare. At the beginning of the 20th century, the site had expanded to 17 hectares.

The position of the Bydgoszcz shop within the organization of the Prussian Eastern Railway underwent several changes. Originally, it fell under the Directorate of the Eastern Railway in Bydgoszcz and returned to this place in the organization after 1874.

=== The interwar period 1918–1939 ===
Before 1918, for more than a century the territory of Poland had been divided between the Austrian partition, the Prussian partition and the Russian partition. After World War I (1914–18) Poland was re-constituted in 1918 as a sovereign independent state.

After 1920 the 'Railway Rolling-Stock Repair Shop' in Bydgoszcz was renamed the 'PKP Class 1 Principal Workshop' under the Regional Directorate of the State Railways PKP in Gdańsk, and after October 1, 1933, under the Regional Directorate in Toruń. During the interwar period, the Bydgoszcz facility was one of 13 principal railway workshops in Poland, six of which belonged to Class I and seven belonged to Class II. In terms of the size of the workforce and the size of the budget, the Bydgoszcz workshop was the second-largest in Poland, after ZNTK Poznań.

In the 1920s the workshop was affected negatively by the departure of workers of German nationality (1500 employees) who were replaced by Poles, among them, emigrants returning from Westphalia and the Rhineland.

The first head of the Bydgoszcz shop was F. Hoffman, who was a member of the Polish commission taking over the workshop from German management on January 20, 1920. His successors were inż. Osiński (1923–26), inż. R. Szmidt (1926–37) and mgr inż. Jan Rupiński (1937–39).

=== German occupation 1939–1945 ===
Military activity in the German invasion of Poland of September 1939 did not do significant damage to the Bydgoszcz railway workshop. After being taken over by the German administration, it was named the 'Bydgoszcz State Railway Repair Shop' (Reichsbahnausbesserungswerk Bromberg). All managerial positions were taken by Germans, and the majority of foremen and section chiefs were Volksdeutsche, or ethnic Germans, who were a privileged class during the 1939–45 Nazi German occupation of Poland. Polish workers were forced to work double shifts, where each shift lasted about 10 hours. The nature of the workshop's activities was unchanged during this period. The workshop overhauled locomotives and freight cars.

The workshop did not suffer major physical damage from military action during the liberation. Polish workers used sabotage to prevent German looting of plant machinery and production equipment which had been dismantled and prepared for shipment to Germany. Polish workers also saved the railway bridges and the Queen Jadwiga Bridge in Bydgoszcz from being blown up by the Germans.

=== Postwar period 1945–1989 ===
After the liberation of Bydgoszcz the workshop reverted to its former name 'PKP Class 1 Principal Workshop,' and Engineering Manager Jan Rupiński returned as head of the organization.

After 1950 the adoption of centralized economic planning in Poland led to important changes in the structure and organization of the workshop. It was renamed 'Repair Shop for Steam Locomotives and Freight Cars No. 13 in Bydgoszcz.' Further changes led to the name 'State Enterprise Workshop for Rolling-Stock Repair in Bydgoszcz.'

In the 1940s and 1950s facilities were rebuilt and new ones were added. Among others, a boiler shop, welding shop, a model shop and store of models, housing for the fire brigade, storerooms and a workers' hotel were added. In 1961–73 a new waterworks, a medical clinic, a cultural center and a dining hall were built, and the headquarters building was enlarged. On December 10, 1975, the first pouring of cast iron took place in a foundry that remains in operation today. By 1970 a total of 14,701 steam locomotives and 272,494 freight cars had been overhauled. The last overhauled steam locomotive left the workshop on October 18, 1985. A total of 20,297 steam locomotives were overhauled in the postwar period. The first diesel locomotive to be repaired was received in 1977. Repairs of electric rolling stock began in 1990.

Under the People's Republic of Poland (1952–89) as in previous times, the workshop was one of the largest employers in Bydgoszcz. On November 28, 1981, the flag of the Factory Committee of Solidarity was raised at the plant. Solidarity played a major role in the region. The Bydgoszcz workshop was one of seventeen 'key factories' in Solidarity's structure, and Solidarity had several thousand members at the workshop, including the management. The Committee took part in all nationwide actions organized by 'Solidarity.' Solidarity leader Lech Wałęsa visited the plant in 1981. After Jaruzelski's government imposed Martial law in Poland on December 13, 1981, the members of the Regional Board were arrested by the state Militia and imprisoned, and the property of the Factory Committee was confiscated. The representative of the Factory Committee on the Regional Board was forced to emigrate from Poland.

In 1982 the Bydgoszcz workshop, together with other ZNTK's, Zaklady Naprawcze Taboru Kolejowego, 'Repair Shops for Railway Rolling Stock' was incorporated in the structure of PKP with the objective of establishing military control. In 1984 the name was changed to 'Defenders of Bydgoszcz, PKP Workshops for Railway Rolling-Stock Repair.'

=== After 1990 ===
The change of government in 1989, namely the end of Communism in Poland, compelled the Bydgoszcz workshop to take steps to find itself a place under the new economic conditions in Poland. On July 24, 1991, ZNTK Bydgoszcz was spun off from the Polish State Railways PKP and became an independent enterprise, its first activities being the repair of passenger rail cars for PKP and also for Warszawska Kolej Dojazdowa, the Warsaw suburban system. It also entered into cooperative agreements with foreign partners, with partners in Lithuania (1994), Belarus (1996), Germany (1999), Ukraine and Russia (2000).

On November 2, 1995, the enterprise was transformed into a Joint-stock company under the State Treasury, and in 1996 its stock was placed in the National Investment Funds.

=== After 2001: production of modern rolling stock ===
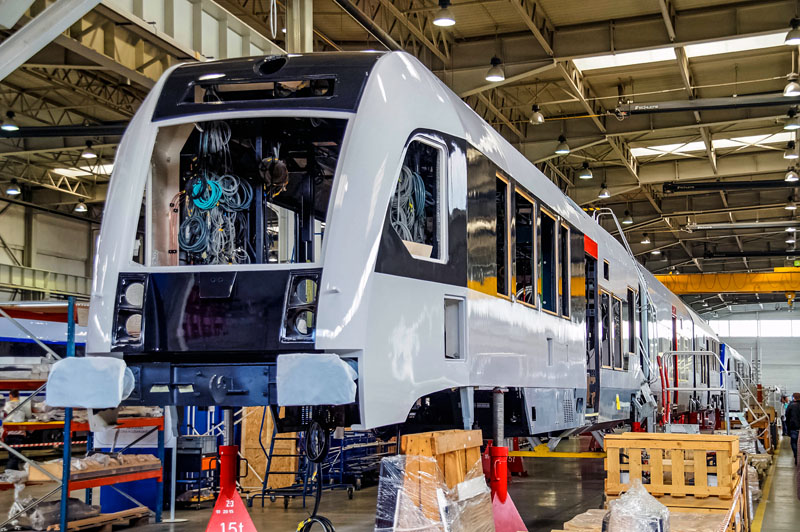
Atribo production line, 2015

On August 17, 2001, a meeting of shareholders authorized the company to adopt the new name Pojazdy Szynowe Pesa Bydgoszcz Spółka Akcyjna Holding. The reason was a change in the firm's principal activities. The most important activity in the future would be building new rolling stock. Repairs and modernization would be secondary activities.

In 2001 the company was active in its cooperation with the General Directorate of Ukrainian Railways and with Lithuanian Railways. A firm was established in Vilnius, with the Bydgoszcz firm as majority owner, for the purpose of carrying out overhauls of locomotives for the Lithuanian Railways.

In 2001 the Pesa was the first constructor in Poland to begin production of railbuses for regional and local transportation. These railbuses won a prize at the International Railways Fair. In 2004–05 Pesa built an order of railbuses for Ukraine.

In 2003 Pesa won a prize at the Trako Railway Fair in Gdansk for a sleeping car meeting EuroNight standards.

From 2004 onwards Pesa delivered both diesel multiple unit (DMU) and electric multiple unit (EMU) trainsets to PKP and to Polish regional operators.

From 2005 onwards the company's product line was enlarged to include vehicles of modular construction for urban transport, including low-floor trams for Elbląg in Poland. In 2006 Pesa signed a contract for 15 trams for Warsaw, followed by orders for Łódź, Gdańsk, Bydgoszcz, Szczecin and Częstochowa.

In 2006 Pesa won its first export order to western Europe, an order from Ferrovie del Sud Est in Italy for 13 diesel multiple units (DMUs). Ferrovie del Sud Est subsequently exercised an option for 10 additional DMUs, increasing the total order to 23 trains.

On May 29, 2009, Pesa signed its 'contract of the century' to deliver 186 type 120Na low-floor trams to the city of Warsaw, to replace 40 percent of Warsaw's fleet, at a cost of 1.5bn złoty, equal to approximately $460 million.

On March 16, 2010, Pesa signed a contract to supply 13 electric multiple unit (EMU) trainsets for Warsaw suburban services. On March 26, 2010, Pesa signed a second contract to supply 14 EMUs for Warsaw suburban services.

On April 11, 2011, Pesa signed a KC 1.99bn order to supply the Czech Railways with 31 two-car diesel multiple unit trains for regional services.

In 2012 Pesa announced its intention to build a tram assembly plant in Pavlodar (Kazakhstan) in conjunction with the city's plans to buy up to 100 new trams from the manufacturer to shore up its ageing public transport infrastructure.

On September 19, 2012, Deutsche Bahn (DB, German Railways) signed two framework contracts with Pesa to build up to 470 diesel multiple unit trains (DMUs) for regional and local services. The first contract is for 120 DMUs with 50 to 100 seats and a maximum speed of 120 km/h. The second contract is for up to 350 DMUs with 50 to 200 seats and a maximum speed of 140 km/h. The trains would include many components made in Germany, including diesel motor power packs from MTU Friedrichshafen and brakes from Knorr-Bremse. No firm contracts were signed at the time, since any orders would depend on operating contracts that DB expects to win in the future. The two contracts could eventually be worth up to €1.2bn, equal to approximately $1.5 billion. The contract between Pesa and DB was the largest deal executed at the 2012 InnoTrans international rail fair.

On September 20, 2013, Pesa presented a project of their first high-speed train. A prototype was planned to be shown during the InnoTrans 2014.

On January 15, 2014, Pesa signed a 167.9m złoty ($US 54.8m) contract with Warsaw Tramways for the delivery of 30 type 134N Jazz low-floor LRVs, to be used on lower-density routes in Warsaw.

On October 30, 2013, Pesa announced a new design of high-speed electric EMU train called the Pesa Dart for PKP Intercity service. The first version of the Pesa Dart will have a top speed of 160 km/h (100 mph), but the train is designed to be capable of 200 km/h (125 mph) and Pesa states that its speed may eventually be raised to 250 km/h (155 mph). in February 2014, Pesa won a contract to supply 20 Pesa Dart trainsets to PKP Intercity for a price of 1.3 billion złoty including 15 years of servicing, to be delivered by October 2015. The Pesa Dart trainsets will be 150 meters long, with 352 seats including 60 in first class, will have ERTMS equipment, and will have a top speed of 160 km/h (100 mph).

In June 2018, Pesa was nationalized by the Polish government after a dearth of new orders and struggles to deliver equipment led to financial stress.

On March 3, 2019, Pesa signed a contract with Czech private operator RegioJet to supply 7 two-car electric multiple units for regional services.

In December 2023, the company signed a contract with the private Czech carrier RegioJet for the delivery of up to 60 electric multiple units. The trains will be able to move at the speed of 200 km/h (125 mph) and will be intended to run on the Prague-Brno route. In the future, the trains will connect cities in the Czech Republic, Poland and Hungary.

In April 2024, Ghana received the first of two diesel multiple units ordered from Pesa. They are to be operated on the Tema-Mpakadan Railway Line.

== Corporate ownership ==
Prior to its 2018 nationalization, Pesa was a joint-stock company. 92% of Pesa shares were owned by eight private investors, including members of the firm's management, among them being Pesa Chairman Tomasz Zaboklicki. Pesa SA is a dominant owner of several industrial companies, making it a rolling stock manufacturing consortium, including: All shares were transferred to the Polish Development Fund when the government took control of the company.

- In August 2008 Pesa acquired a 60 percent stake in ZNTK Mińsk Mazowiecki, Zakłady Naprawcze Taboru Kolejowego, (Rolling Stock Repair Shop) in Mińsk Mazowiecki located some 40 km east of Warsaw. This organization with some 800 employees performs overhauls and modernizations of rail passenger cars, metro cars, trams, railbuses and locomotives. The location near Warsaw enables ZNTK Mińsk Mazowiecki to provide servicing for trams that Pesa is delivering to Warsaw. In 2022 the company was renamed Pesa Mińsk Mazowiecki
- Zakład Mechaniczny SKRAW-MECH Spółka z o.o (SKRAW-MECH Mechanical Plant Ltd.) in Bydgoszcz, a manufacturer of laser cut steel and machine components for agriculture, ironworks, mining and the automobile industry,
- Zakład Produkcyjno - Remontowy "REM-SUW" Sp. z o.o. ("REM-SUW" Production and Repair Ltd.) in Bydgoszcz - producing train elevators and stainless steel components for rail vehicles,
- Zakład Produkcyjno-Usługowy EKO-PARTNER Sp. z o.o. (EKO-PARTNER Production and Servises Ltd.) - provides smithery and casting services.

== Employment ==
From its founding in 1851 the workshop was one of the largest enterprises in Bydgoszcz. In the 1880s the total number of employees in all other factories in Bydgoszcz equalled only one-half of the number of employees in the Principal Workshop of the Prussian Eastern Railway. This was the largest industry in the Bydgoszcz governmental region. From 1890 onwards the workshop outranked the shops in Berlin and Königsberg, and its workers comprised one-quarter of positions involved in the repair of steam locomotives, 1/3 of those repairing tenders, and 1/5 of those repairing freight cars. At that time, the workshop employed more than 1500 workers and repaired 80 locomotives daily.

Employment by year:

Year	Number of employees	
Year	Pesa	ZNTK MM
1875	544	not in the group
1889	1000	not in the group
1906	1500	not in the group
1934	1420	not in the group
1938	1520	not in the group
1945	3175	not in the group
1955	5229	not in the group
1970	4845	not in the group
1985	3227	not in the group
2001	1540	not in the group
2006	1659	not in the group
2007	2113	not in the group
2008	2600	800
2012	3700	

== Railway vehicles produced by the Pesa group ==
After August 2008 the group also includes ZNTK "Mińsk Mazowiecki"

Own production
Self-propelled diesel passenger vehicles
214M; Partner	218M	219M; Atribo	223M; Link	610M	611M	620M	630M	730M		Total
48+	61+	63	4+	1	0+	25+	3+	14+		205+
Self-propelled electric passenger vehicles
308B	13WE; Mazovia	15WE; Acatus	16WEk; Bydgostia	21WE; Elf	22WE; Elf	27WE; Elf	32WE; Acatus II	33WE	34WE; Elf	Total
8	1	1	14	0+	25+	13+	5	14	4	85+
Locomotives
111E; Gama										Total
43										
Trailer cars
401M	other passenger			for freight*:		443V	443Va	430S	430Sa	Total
5	>350			for freight*:		525	370	526	140	>1916
Trams
120N; Tramicus	121N; Tramicus	122N; Tramicus	120Na; Swing	120Nb; Swing	122Na; Swing	129Nb; Twist	2012N; Twist-Step	134N; Jazz		Total
15	6	12	173+	9	0+	5+	30	85		280+
Modernizations
805Nm	EN57	EN71	ED72	SM42	ST44	ST45	ST46	passenger cars		Total
2	?+	5	2+	4+	?	13+	1+	>400		
+ – additional vehicles of this type are being produced / additional modernizations of this type are being performed, > – data not precise, "other passenger” includes only cars for Ukrainian operators * – for the period 1998–2009 ? – data lacking

=== Reliability ===
Pesa trains operated by Lithuanian Railways including models Pesa 620M, 630M, 730M have experienced frequent breakdowns and a variety of quality and reliability issues.

== See also ==
- Economy of Poland
- List of Polish companies
- Solaris Bus & Coach
