= Pesa 610M =

Diesel inspection railcar produced by Pesa

610M
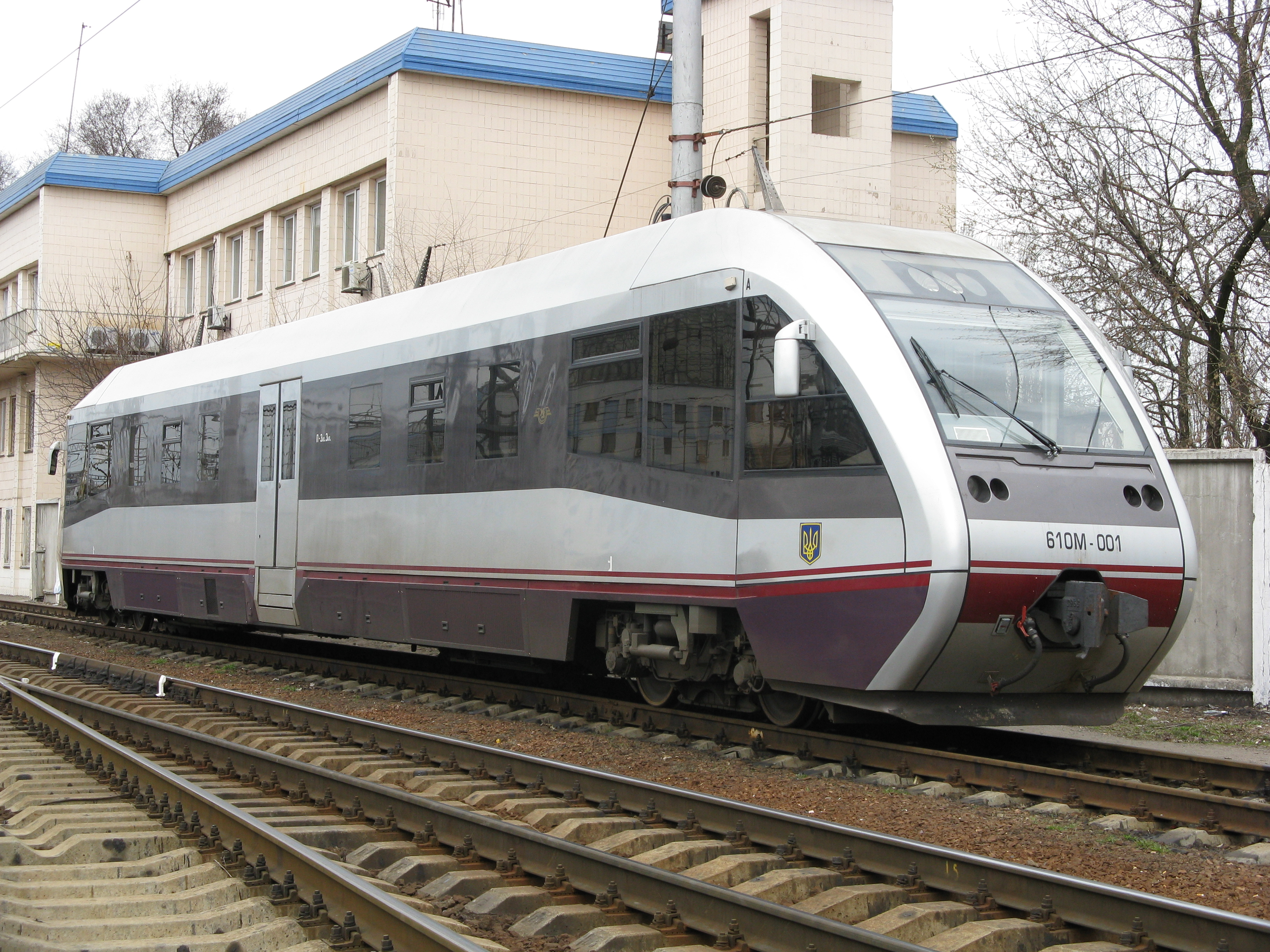
- 610M-001
- Stock type: diesel multiple unit
- Manufacturer: Pesa
- Assembly: Bydgoszcz, Poland
- Constructed: 2004
- Number built: 1
- Capacity: 15

Specifications
- Train length: 27,350 mm (1,077 in)
- Width: 3,000 mm (120 in)
- Height: 4,222 mm (166.2 in)
- Floor height: 1,345 mm (53.0 in)
- Wheel diameter: 840 mm (33 in)
- Maximum speed: 160 km/h (100 mph)
- Weight: 58 t (128,000 lb)
- Engine type: MTU 6R183TD13H
- Transmission: Voith Tr211re3
- AAR wheel arrangement: B'B'

Pesa 610M is a broad-gauge diesel inspection railcar produced by Pesa for Ukrainian Railways. It is a developmental version of the single-unit diesel rail vehicle Partner (type 214M). Only one unit was built, delivered in 2004.

== History ==
In 2001, Pesa began producing brand-new rail vehicles, starting with the standard-gauge diesel motorized railcar type 214M intended for the Polish market. In 2004, Pesa expanded production to fulfill orders for broad-gauge vehicles, with the first order being for five railcars for Ukrainian Railways. One of these is the 610M inspection railcar, designed for the general director of Ukrainian Railways, while the remaining four are 620M railcars intended for regular passenger service. The exterior and interior design of the 610M inspection railcar was developed by an unofficial design group named D7, including Marek Adamczewski and Marek and Bogumiła Jóźwicki.

In 2011, Russian Railways ordered a new model of inspection vehicle from Pesa – the 611M.

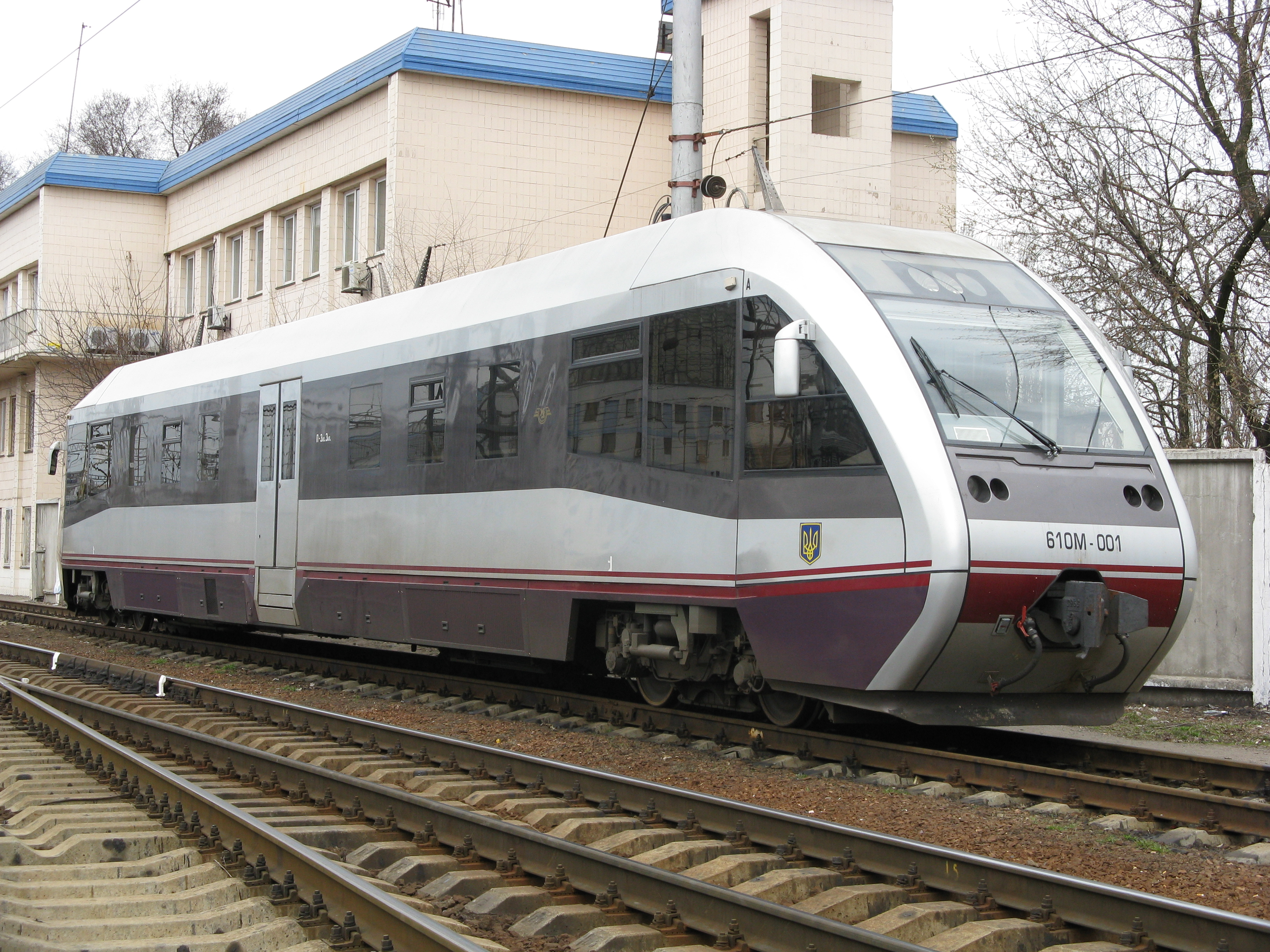
610M

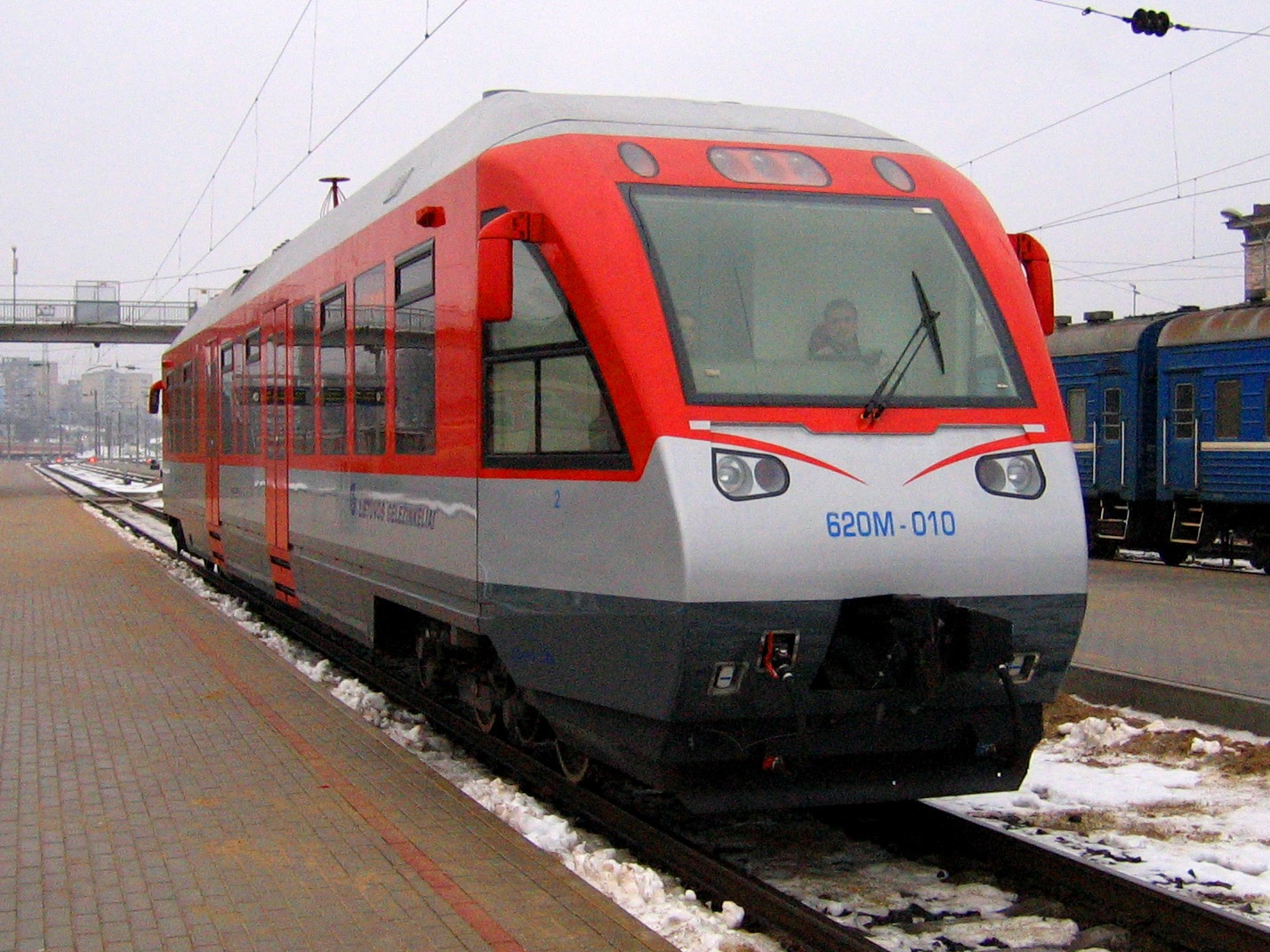
620M

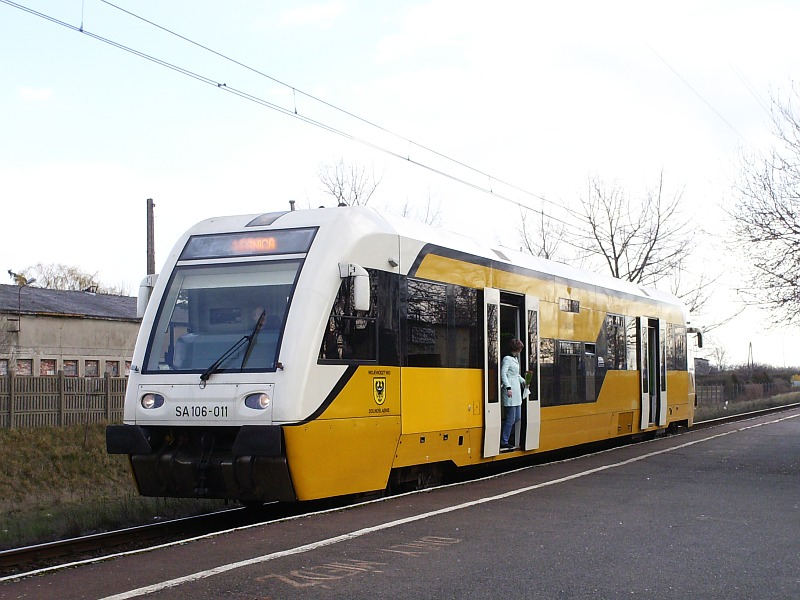
214M

== Construction ==
=== Body ===
The 610M is a motorized railcar adapted to broad-gauge loading gauges (wider compared to Polish counterparts) and equipped with SA3 couplers. The structural integrity of the body is rated as P II according to the PN EN 12663 standard. Stainless steel sheeting has been used.

=== Drive and suspension ===
The railcar runs on two drive bogies of type 3MSa. The suspension has two degrees of springing, with the second being pneumatic springs. The drive units consist of two MTU engines connected to Voith gearboxes. Multiple traction of up to three vehicles is possible.

The vehicle is equipped with a control and diagnostics system.

=== Passenger space ===
The interior of the vehicle has been adapted for work and travel. At both ends of the vehicle, there are viewing rooms connected to the driver's cabin, allowing observation of the currently traversed railway line. The railcar also includes a conference room equipped with audiovisual equipment, as well as an office-sleeping compartment with a bathroom (closed toilet system) and a kitchenette. Wooden elements have been used for the vehicle's interior finishing, and the seats are covered with leather upholstery. The interior is fully air-conditioned and monitored.

=== Entrance ===
On each side of the vehicle, there is one pair of doors with a width of 1,300 mm. The connection of two lowered steps inside and one extending outward allows for access to both high platforms and directly to the track bed. The floor is located at a height of 1,345 mm above the rail head level.

== Operation ==
Country	User	Quantity	Numbers	Delivery years	Sources
Ukraine	Ukrainian Railways (Southwestern Railways)	1	001	2004	

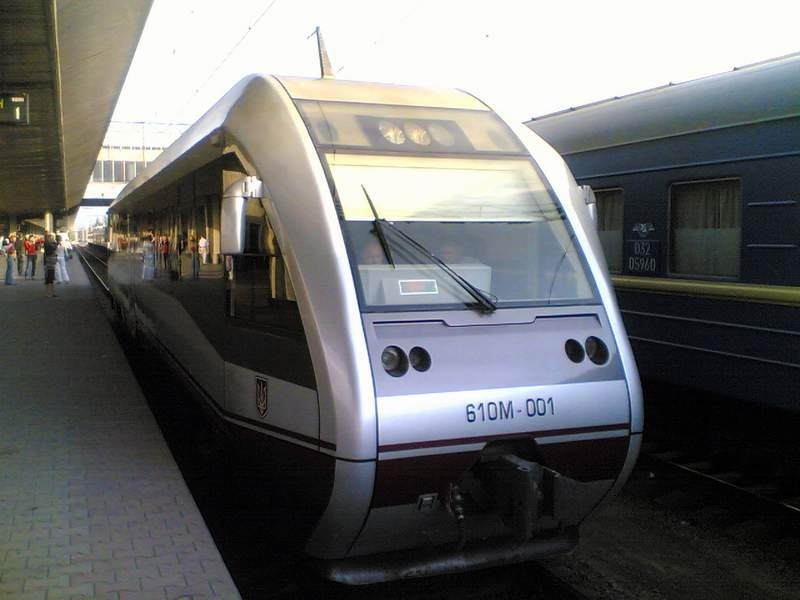
610M at the Kyiv-Pasazhyrskyi railway station

610M-001 has been in service since 2004 for inspection runs for the Ukrainian Railways. By December 2012, when it underwent a fourth-level technical inspection at the manufacturer in Bydgoszcz, it had traveled 700,000 km.

During the Russian invasion in 2022, the vehicle was repurposed as a mobile command center for managing Ukrainian Railways. Starlink installations were mounted on board.
