= Pesa 620M =

Diesel railcar produced since 2004 by Pesa

620M
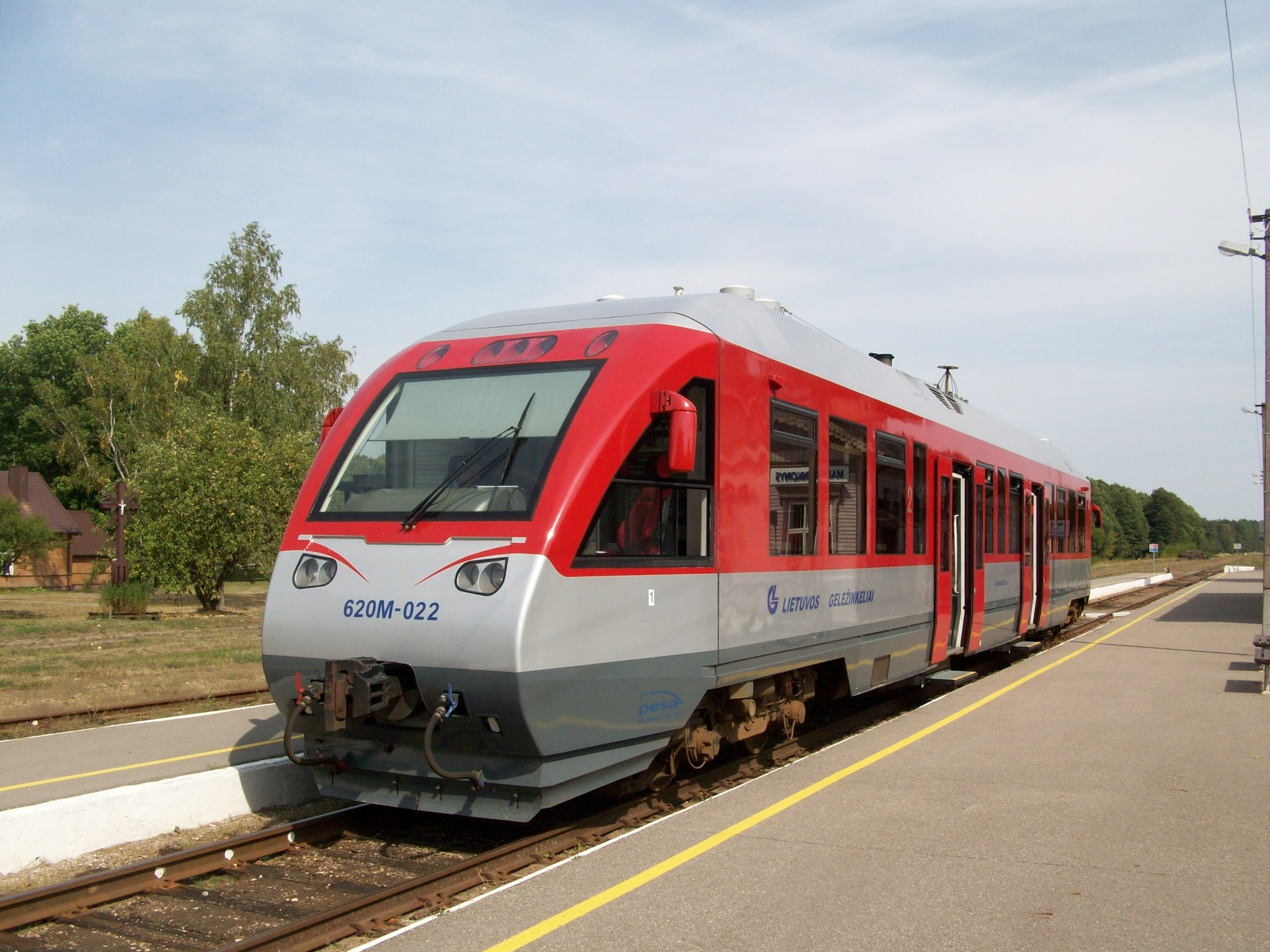
- Lithuanian 620M at the Marcinkonys railway station
- Stock type: diesel multiple unit
- Manufacturers: Pesa; Belkommunmash
- Assembly: Bydgoszcz, Poland; Minsk Belarus
- Constructed: 2004–2013
- Number built: 29
- Capacity: 171

Specifications
- Train length: 26,400–27,350 mm (86.61–89.73 ft)
- Width: 3,000 mm (9.8 ft)
- Height: 4,222–4,435 mm (13.852–14.551 ft)
- Platform height: 1,345 mm (4.413 ft)
- Wheel diameter: 840 mm (33 in)
- Maximum speed: 120 km/h (75 mph)
- Weight: 50–56.7 t (110,000–125,000 lb)
- Engine type: diesel MAN or MTU

Pesa 620M is a broad-gauge diesel railcar produced since 2004 by Pesa for the Lithuanian Railways (12 units) and Ukrainian Railways (11 units), and since 2011, in cooperation with Belkommunmash, also for the Belarusian Railway (6 units). A total of 29 units were produced.

== History ==
After introducing the 214M Partner diesel railcars to the Polish market in 2001, Pesa decided to produce similar vehicles for broad-gauge railways. The first units were purchased by Ukrainian Railways. In 2004, the 620M-001 was showcased at the InnoTrans trade fair in Berlin, and deliveries to the customer began. In addition to the 620M vehicles, a related motorized inspection car, the 610M, was also delivered to Ukraine. Subsequent orders for the 620M came from Lithuania and Belarus. The Belarusian vehicles were produced in collaboration with Belkommunmash in Minsk, which was responsible for tasks such as interior outfitting.

Following the experience with the 620M, railways in Ukraine and Lithuania decided to also order a more spacious, two-car version of these vehicles – the Pesa 630M.

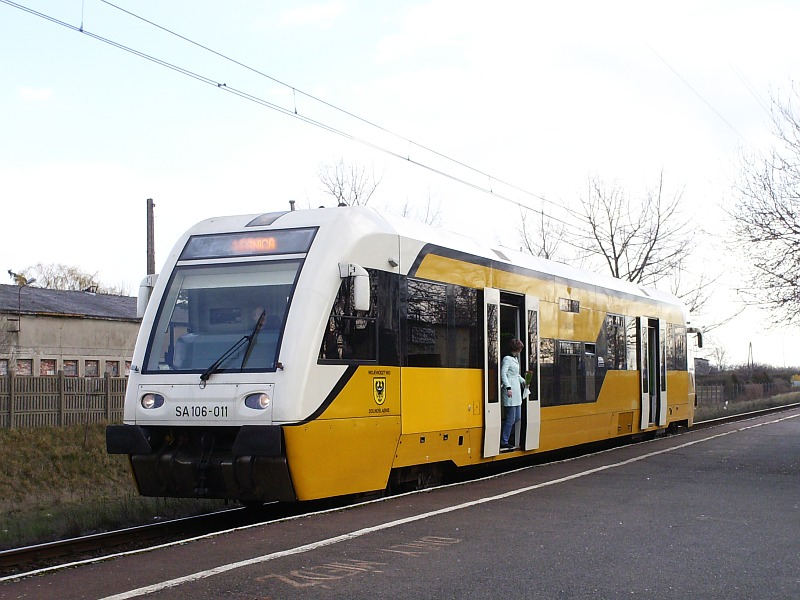
214M

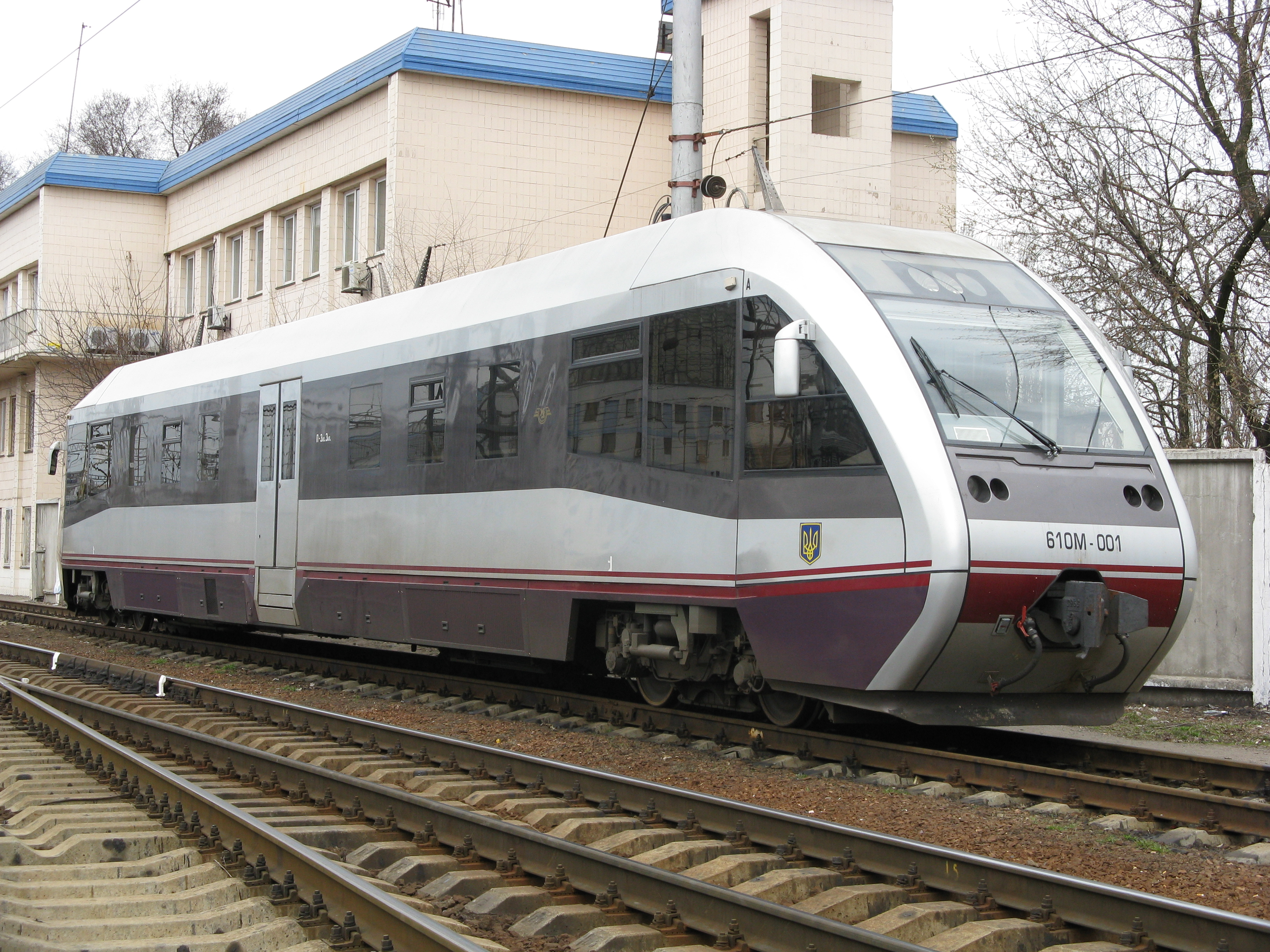
610M

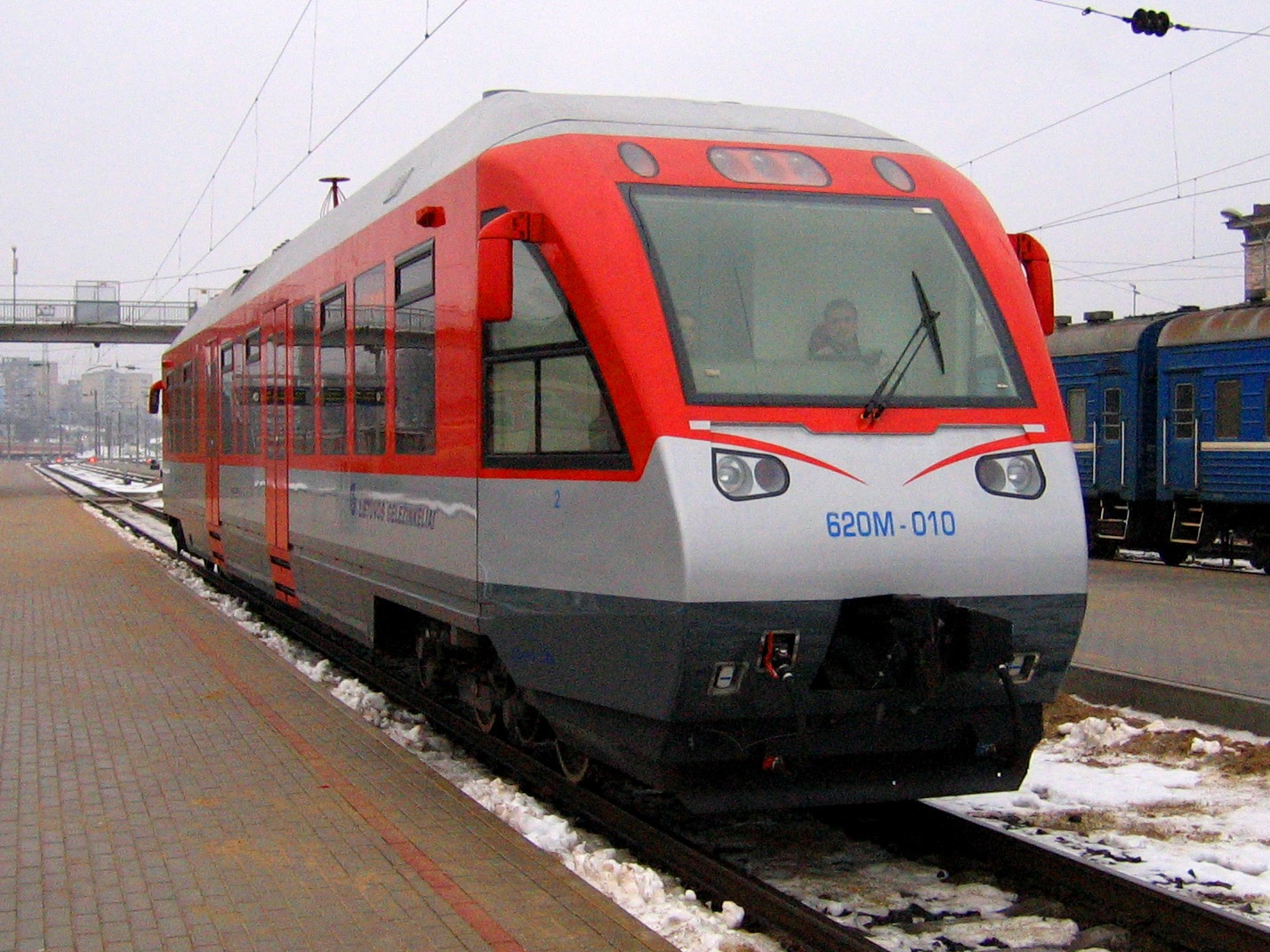
620M

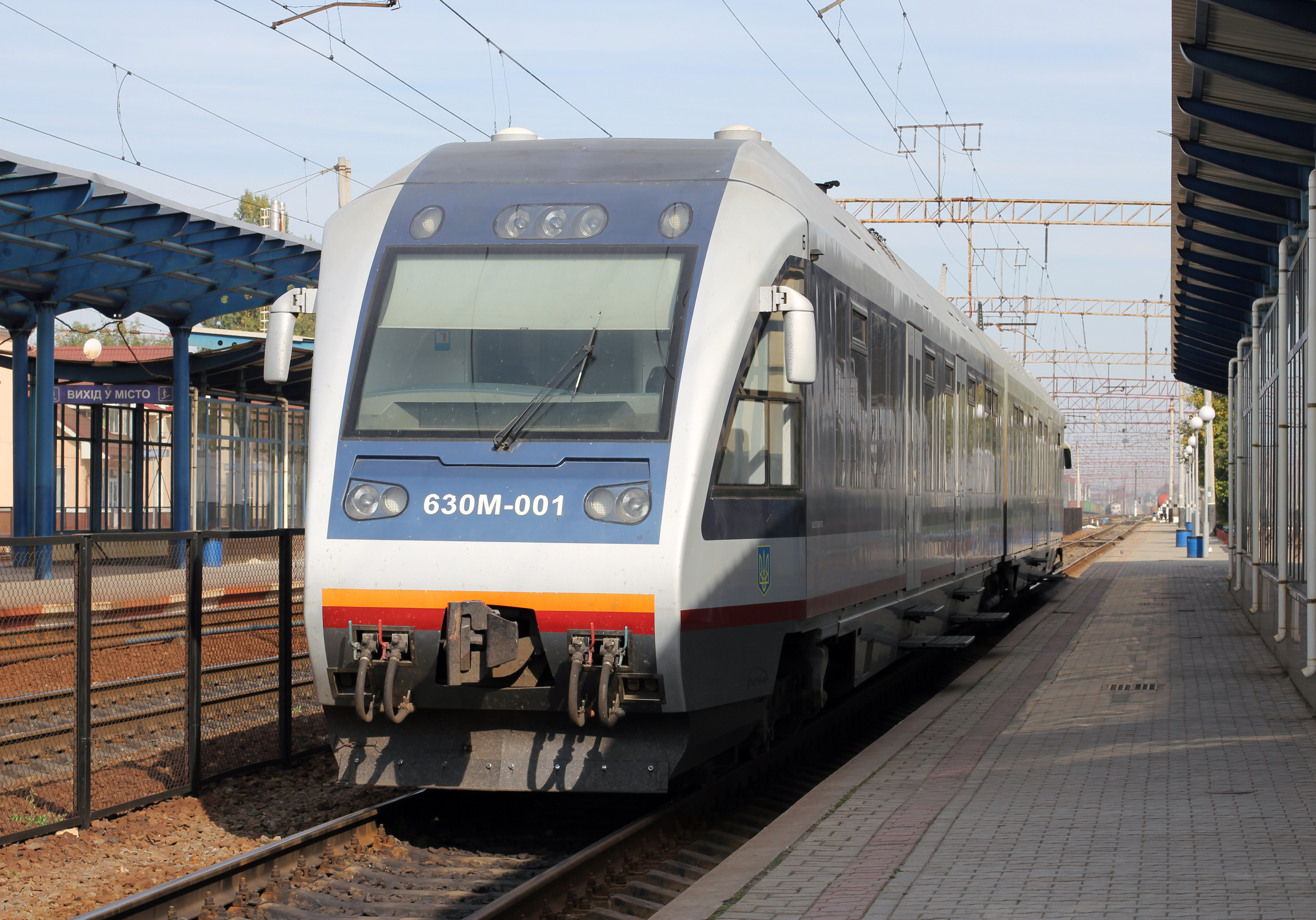
630M

== Design ==
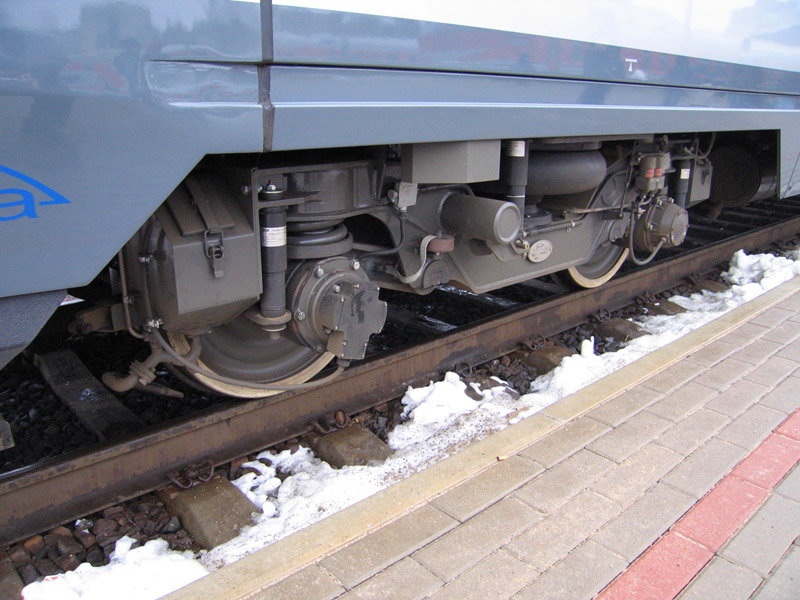
Bogie

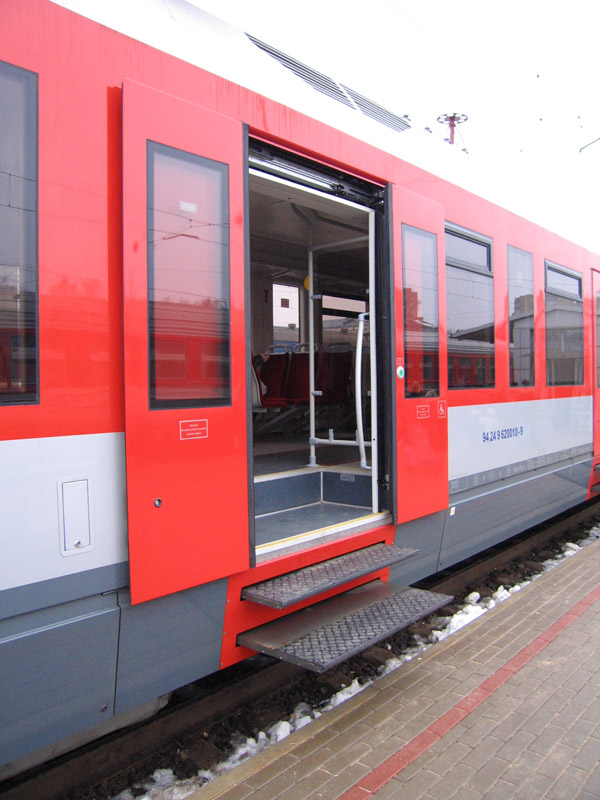
Entrance to the vehicle

The 620M is a developed version of the Partner diesel railcar (Pesa 214M). The primary differences between this model and its predecessor are its adaptation to a broader gauge (1,520 mm) and a wider loading gauge (T1 according to GOST 9238-83), which allows for a 2+3 seating arrangement in the passenger area. The vehicle's range is 1,000 km.

The structural strength of the 620M meets the PN-EN 12663 (category PII) standard. The vehicles use Pesa's own 8AS type running bogies and 3MSb powered bogies. The suspension system features two levels of springing, comprising coil springs and air cushions. The bogies can accommodate wheelsets for both 1,520 mm and 1,435 mm track gauges, allowing the 620M to travel independently across Polish territory. The railcars can operate in multiple unit configurations (up to three vehicles).

The interior of the vehicles is fully air-conditioned and equipped with monitoring systems. A multifunctional space is located near one of the entrances.

Serial number	Operator	Axle configuration	Engine type	Number and power of engines	Transmission	Service weight	Sources
001 ÷ 004	Ukrainian Railways	B'2'	MTU 6R183TD13H	1 × 315 kW	Hydrodynamic Voith Tr211re3	50 t	
005 ÷ 008, 011 ÷ 012	Ukrainian Railways	B'2'	MAN D2876LUE623	1 × 385 kW	Hydrodynamic Voith Tr211re4	50 t	
	Lithuanian Railways	B'2'	MAN D2876LUE623	1 × 382 kW or 1 × 385 kW (various sources)	Hydrodynamic Voith Tr211re4	50 t	
ДП1 001 ÷ 003	Belarusian Railway	B'2'	MAN	1 × 382 kW or 1 × 412 kW (various sources)	Voith	56.7 t	

== Operations ==
Country	Operator	Number of units	Unit numbers	Version	Delivery years	Sources
Ukraine	Ukrainian Railways	11	001 ÷ 008, 011 ÷ 012		2004–2008	
Ukraine	Ukrainian Railways	1	025	620McU	2012	
Lithuania	Lithuanian Railways	12	009, 010, 013 ÷ 022		2008–2011	
Belarus	Belarusian Railway	6	ДП1-001 ÷ 006	620McB	2012–2013	

=== Ukraine ===
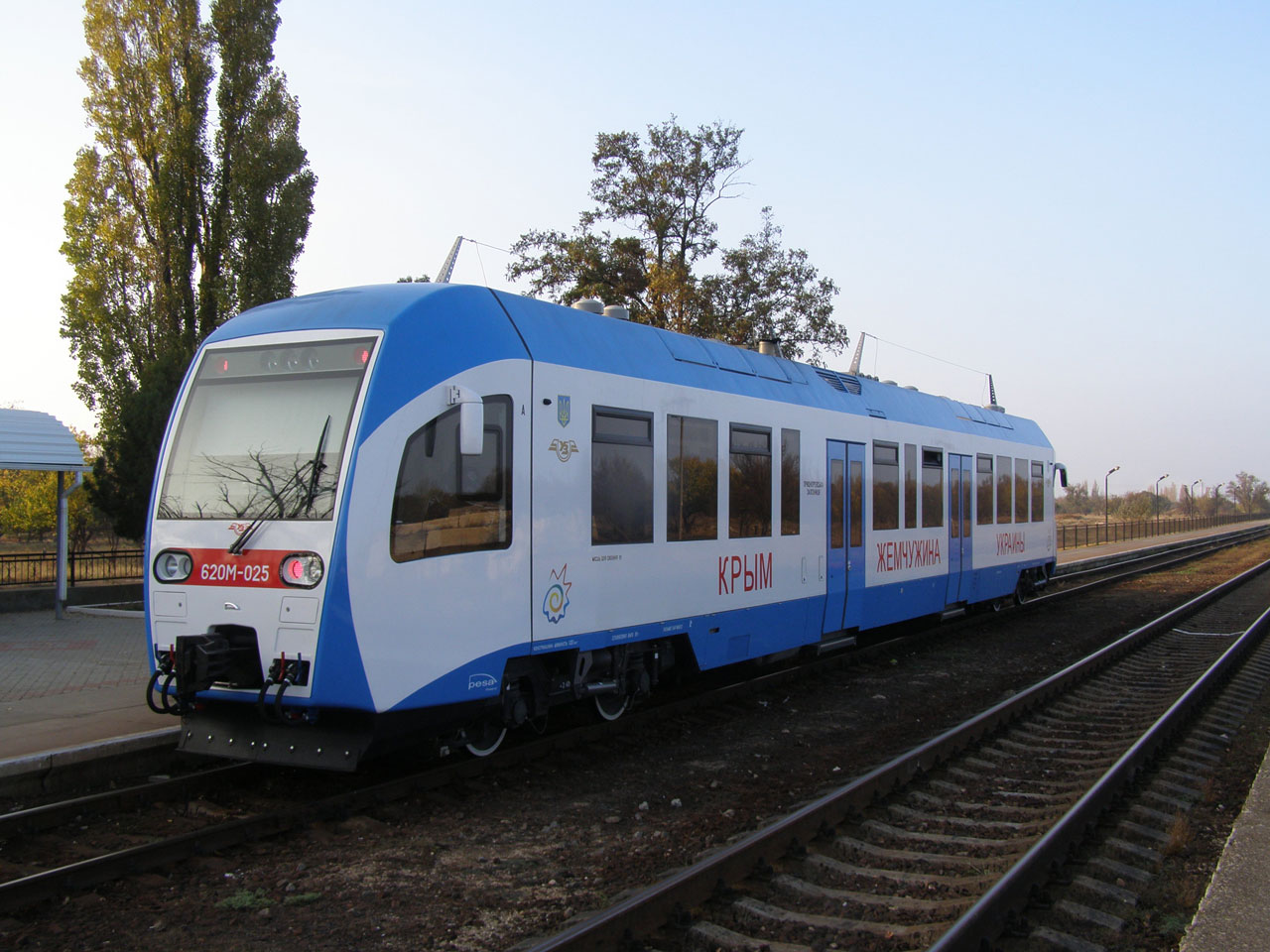
Crimean 620M-025

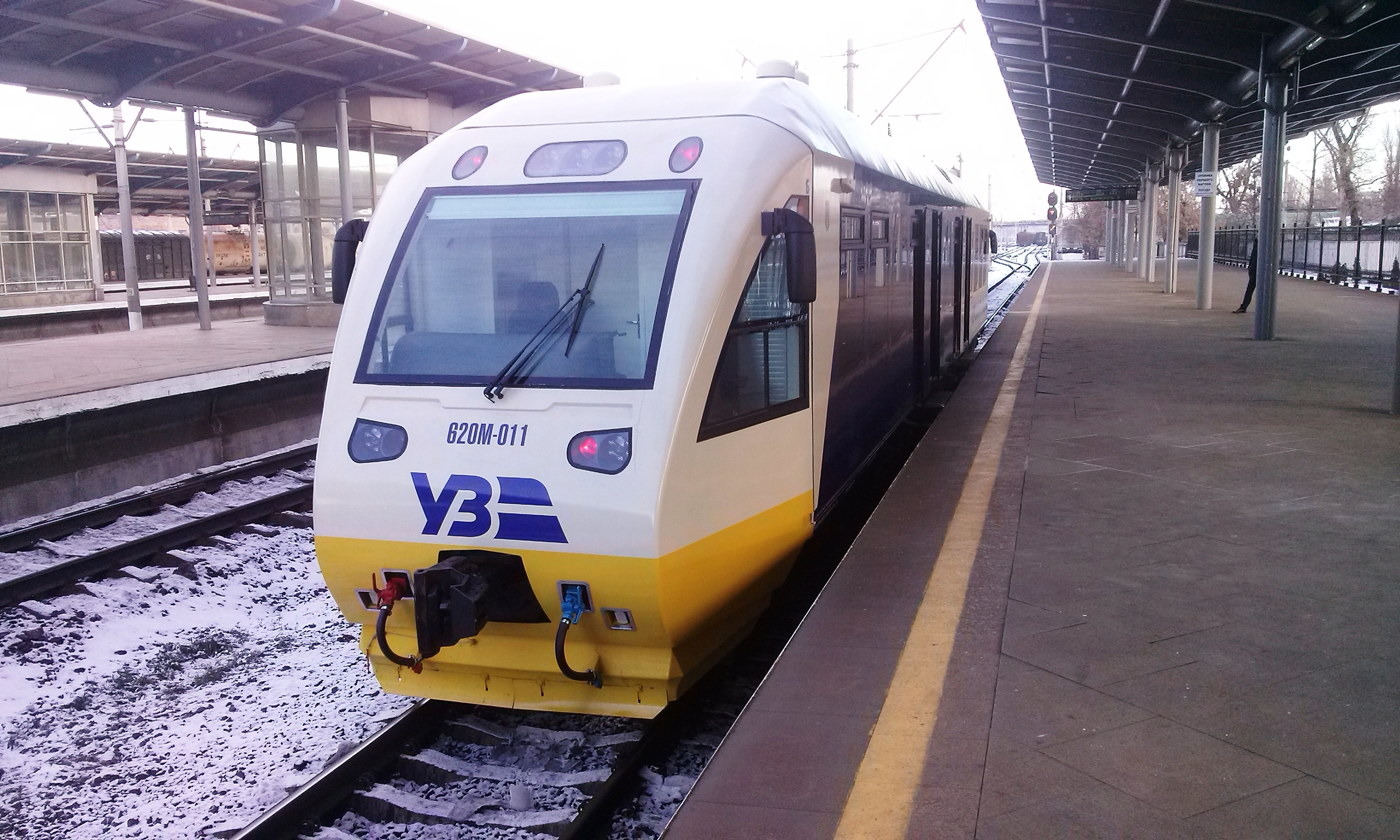
620M-011 servicing the airport

The diesel vehicles used in passenger service on Ukrainian railways, produced by Ganz-MÁVAG (D and D1 series) and RVR in Riga (DR1 series), were significantly worn out. Ukrainian Railways initially planned to order diesel railcars from the Czech company Vagonka Studénka. However, due to financial difficulties, they decided to place an order with Pesa in Bydgoszcz.

Deliveries began in 2004, with the first vehicles being an inspection railcar (610M) for the Ukrainian Railways' management and the first 620M railcars for regular passenger services.

Originally, the order consisted of four diesel railcars intended for use on lightly trafficked routes. Positive experiences with these vehicles led Ukrainian Railways to order additional units, which were allocated to the Southern and Lviv Railways. In total, ten 620M railcars were delivered to Ukraine between 2004 and 2009.

In October 2012, a new unit (620M-025) was delivered to Crimea. This vehicle, painted in colors reflecting the flag of the Autonomous Republic of Crimea, was officially launched on October 26 at the Simferopol railway station. The 620M-025 was purchased to service routes between Dzhankoi, Armiansk, and Feodosia.

On 30 November 2018, a new connection between Kyiv-Pasazhyrskyi railway station and Boryspil International Airport was launched, utilizing four modernized 620M railcars to handle 27 pairs of connections. During the first few weeks of operation, the average occupancy was 30 passengers. The modernization of the sixth railcar was completed in April 2019.

=== Lithuania ===
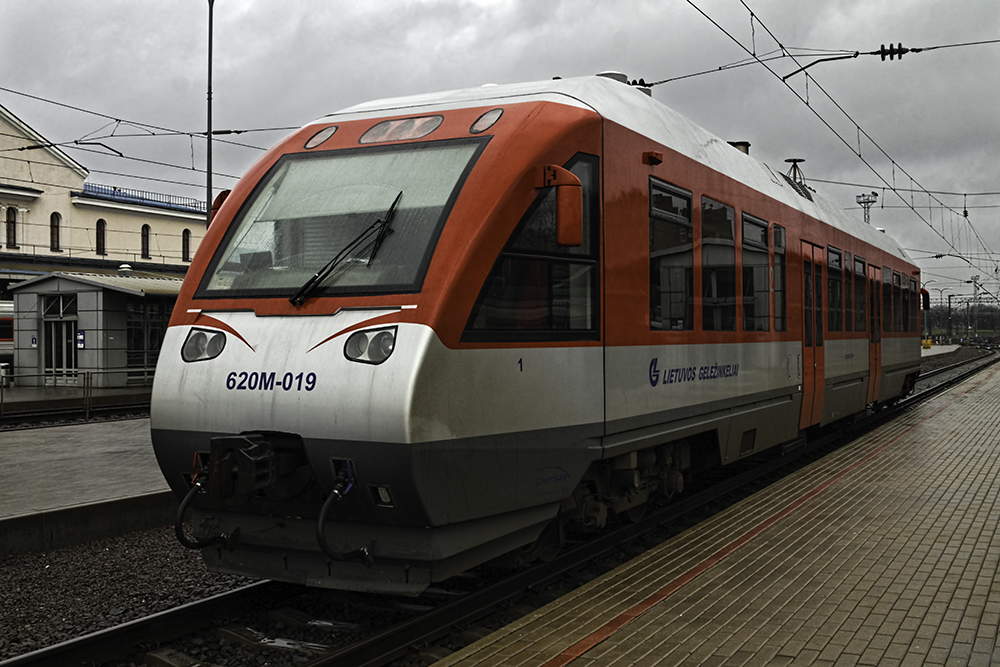
620M at the station in Vilnius

In 2008, Lithuanian Railways placed an order for 620M railbuses to service local lines with low traffic volumes. The first railbus was officially presented in October 2008 at the Vilnius railway station. By 2009, a total of four vehicles had been delivered. On 2 October 2008, a connection serviced by the 620M between the Vilnius railway station and the Vilnius Airport was launched. In 2009, the four delivered Pesa units also serviced routes from Vilnius to Šeštokai, Radviliškis to Mažeikiai, and Šiauliai to Rokiškis.

An agreement to deliver eight additional units was signed on 19 April 2010 in Vilnius. With the completion of deliveries in April 2011, there were 12 units of the 620M series in operation in Lithuania. The new railbuses allowed for the complete phasing out of the D1 series vehicles. Besides the previously mentioned routes, the 620M units also operate connections from Vilnius to Stasylos, Kalveliai Eldership, Ignalina, and Marcinkonys, from Kaunas to Marijampolė, Kybartai, Šeštokai, and Trakai, and from Radviliškis to Šiauliai.

=== Belarus ===
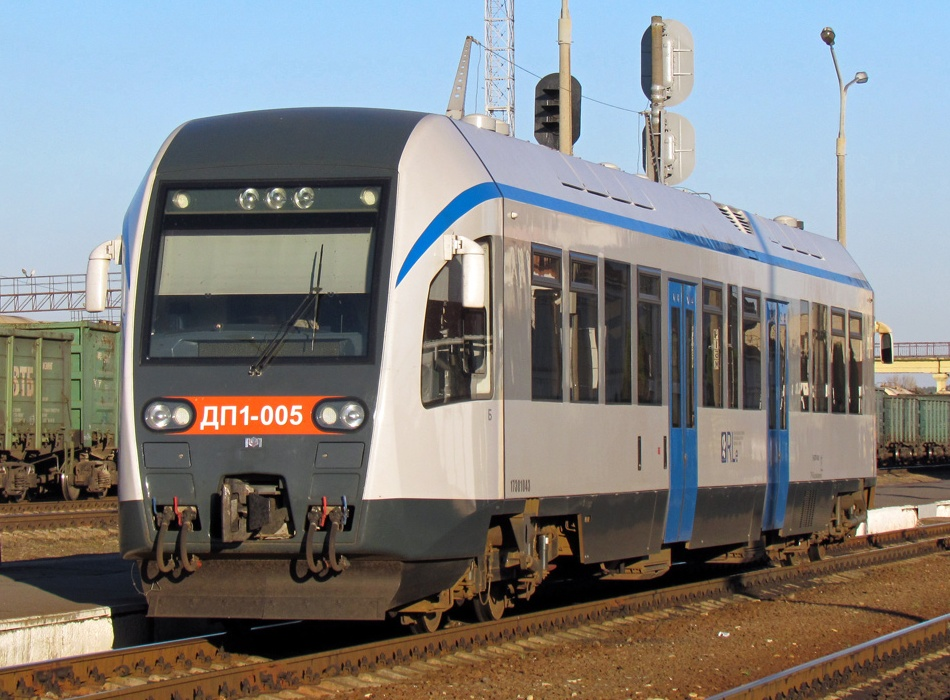
620M in Kalinkavichy

In 2011, Belarusian Railway placed an order for six 620M series railbuses. The production for this order was carried out in cooperation between the Polish company Pesa and the Belarusian company Belkommunmash. The first vehicle was delivered by Pesa to Minsk on 23 December 2011. From January to April 2012, technical and operational trials were conducted on the Stowbtsy–Haradzyeya line. The first unit was officially received by the customer from Belkommunmash on 13 April 2012. Belarusian 620M railbuses are designated as DP1 (ДП1) in the nomenclature of Belarusian Railway.

The official introduction of the new series into service took place on 1 May 2012 at the Kalinkavichy railway station. The first two vehicles were assigned to economy-class routes Kalinkavichy–Vasilyevichy–Khoiniki and Kalinkavichy–Slavhechna. On 25 August 2012, another 620M vehicle began servicing business-class routes, specifically Orsha–Horki and Krychaw–Orsha–Horki. The railbus for these routes is based at the locomotive depot in Mogilev.

In 2013, Pesa signed another contract for the delivery of additional rail vehicles to Belarus, specifically three units of the 730M type.
