= Pesa Tramicus =

Tram produced by Pesa

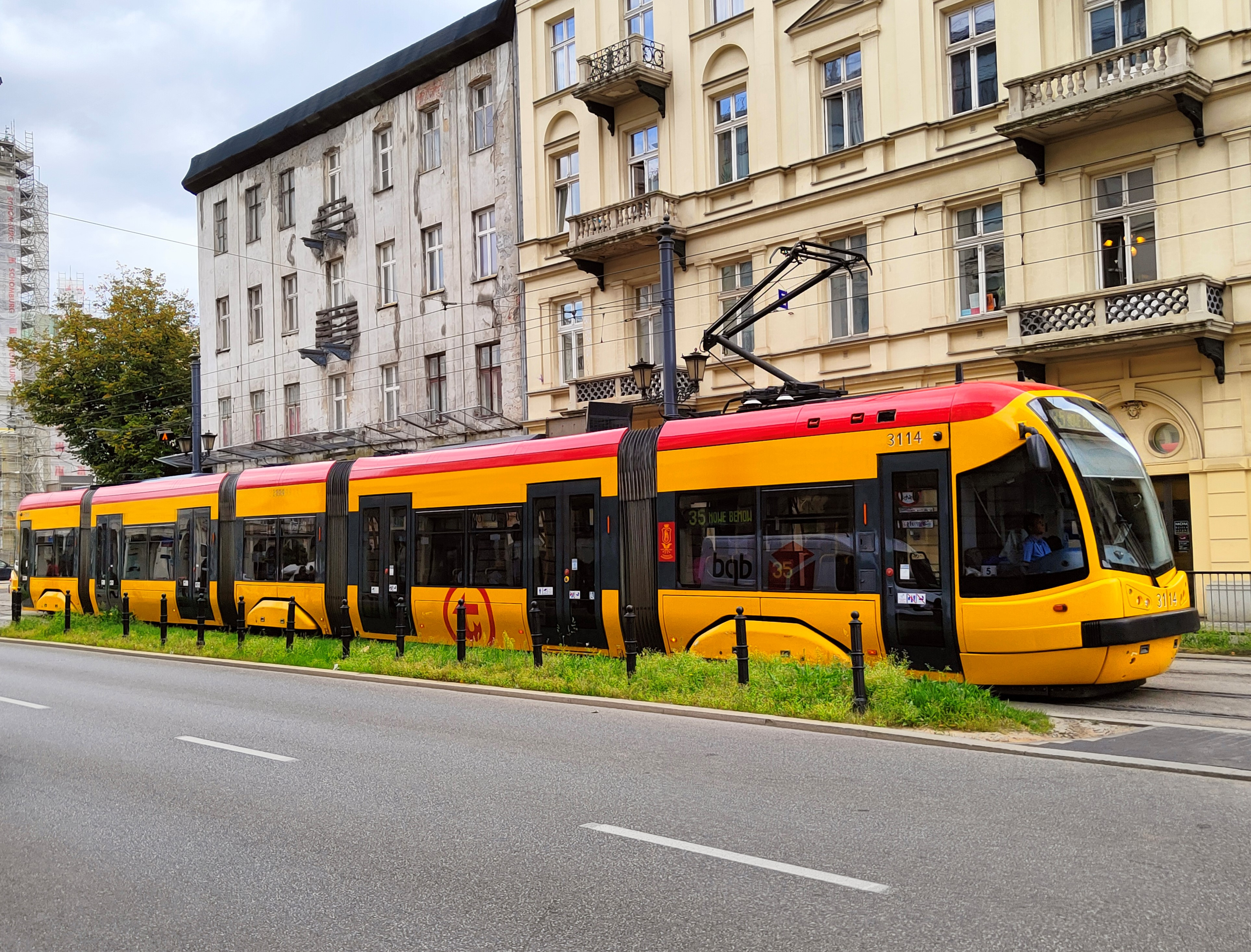
- Warsaw's 120N on line 35
- Stock type: electric multiple unit
- Manufacturer: Pesa
- Assembly: Bydgoszcz, Poland
- Constructed: 2005–2008
- Number built: 33

Specifications
- Train length: 20.22–31.82 m (66.3–104.4 ft)
- Width: 2,350 mm (93 in)
- Height: 3,400 mm (130 in)
- Floor height: 350–480 mm (14–19 in)
- Low-floor: 100%
- Articulated sections: 3–5
- Axle load: 1,800 mm (71 in)
- Engine type: induction motor
- Electric system: 600 V DC

Pesa Tramicus is a uni-directional low-floor tram produced by Pesa in Bydgoszcz. The tram is available in three versions: a three-section (121N) or five-section (120N and 122N) configuration. The Tramicus is of the multi-articulated type with sections connected by accordion-type pivot joints. Between 2005 and 2008, a total of 33 Tramicus trams were produced, and they were delivered to Warsaw, Łódź, Elbląg, and Bydgoszcz. The experience gained from designing and operating the Tramicus family led to the development of the Swing vehicles.

== History ==
=== Origins ===
In the 1990s, new normal-gauge tram designs with low floors, such as the 112N and 114Na, were developed in Poland, but only in limited numbers and did not represent any significant quality leaps. The last trams produced in Chorzów were manufactured by Alstom in 2001. Since then, Poland did not produce tram cars, and Polish cities modernized their fleets by importing vehicles from abroad.

To fill the gap in the Polish market, four companies aimed to enter the tram sector: Alstom Konstal (the direct successor of Konstal), Pesa Bydgoszcz (formerly Zakłady Naprawcze Taboru Kolejowego, focusing on repairs and the construction of railway vehicles), FPS Cegielski from Poznań (engaged in, among other things, railway vehicle construction), and Protram from Wrocław (specializing in tram modernizations).

Pesa entered the tram market in 2003 by modernizing two 805Na trams (renumbered to 805Nm) belonging to Bydgoszcz. However, the modernized vehicles were very unreliable.

In 2005, Pesa began accepting orders for brand-new trams from Warsaw (120N) and Elbląg (121N). The first trams from Bydgoszcz (Pesa 121N) were built and introduced into service in 2006. The 120N model was introduced in August 2007, and the 122N in January 2008 (homologation was obtained on 20 December 2007).

=== Orders ===
- 11 August 2005: contract signed for 6 trams of type 121N for Elbląg.
- 22 February 2006: contract signed for 15 trams of type 120N for Warsaw.
- 24 October 2006: contract signed for 10 trams of type 122N for Łódź.
- 12 September 2007: contract signed for 2 trams of type 122N for Bydgoszcz.

=== Tramicus family ===
The first trams built by Pesa were marketed under the Tramicus brand. This family includes the Pesa 120N, Pesa 121N, and Pesa 122N. The five-car Pesa 120N and Pesa 122N are nearly identical in design (with the main difference being the track gauge) and share the same factory numbering.

An unrealized project was the Pesa 119N, which was intended to be a three-car normal-gauge design, but no orders were placed for it.

=== Type names ===
The type name 120N continues the convention of using a three-digit number followed by the letter N for tram models, a system that started in the mid-1960s with Pafawag 101N (1968) and Konstal 102N (1967). The designations directly preceding 120N were for FPS 118N and Pesa 119N. The name Pesa 122N, like Pesa 121N, represents an inconsistency with the accepted rules. Narrow-gauge wagons should have been designated with a number starting with 8. Considering that Pesa 122N is a narrow-gauge version of Pesa 120N, it should have been named Pesa 820N.

=== End of production ===
After completing the delivery of 122N trams to Bydgoszcz and Łódź in 2008, production of the Tramicus family ceased. They were replaced in Pesa's offer by the Swing family. New trams from this family were ordered, among others, by Warsaw, Bydgoszcz, and Łódź.

Construction

Type	Number of sections	Length	Body width	Weight	Number and power of motors	Track gauge	Seating capacity	Features	Sources
120N	5	31.82 m	2.35 m	43.4 t	4 × 105 kW	1,435 mm	63	air conditioning, wheelchair access, monitoring	
121N	3	20.22 m	2.35 m	24.55 t	4 × 105 kW	1,000 mm	41	wheelchair access, monitoring	
122N (Bydgoszcz)	5	31.82 m	2.35 m	38.4 t	4 × 105 kW	1,000 mm	63	air conditioning, wheelchair access, monitoring	
122N (Łódź)	5	31.82 m	2.35 m	38.4 t	4 × 105 kW	1,000 mm	63	air conditioning, wheelchair access, monitoring, wireless internet	

=== Body ===
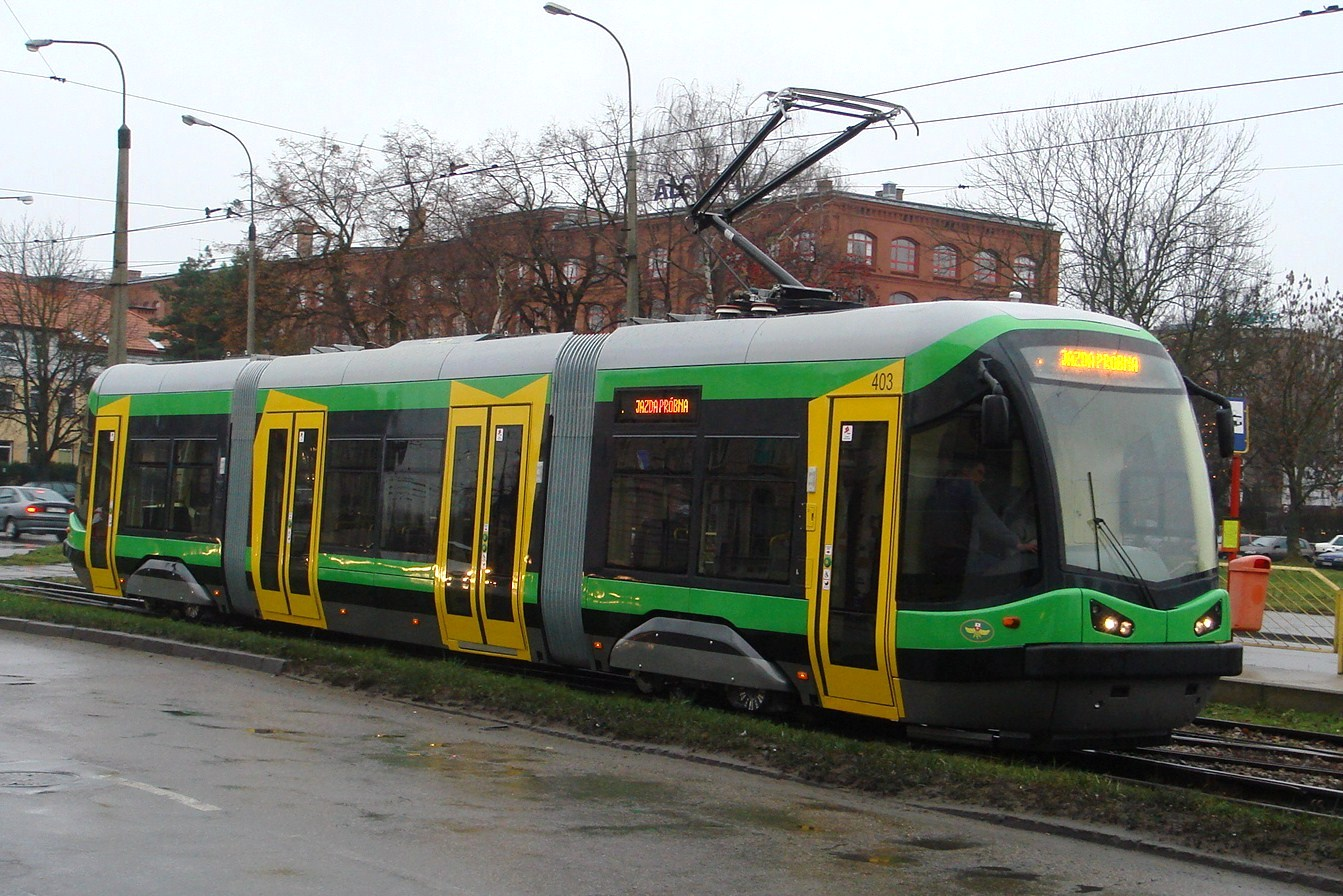
Three-section Pesa 121N

The outer sections of the tram have one single door with a 700 mm clearance, and the suspended sections have two pairs of double doors with a clearance of 1,300 mm.

The exterior shell is made of steel and laminate elements. The trams are equipped with elastomer flow bumpers that absorb impact at speeds up to several km/h. The driver's cabin is a roll cage that protects the operator in case of a collision.

The mechanical design of the Tramicus family trams (119N–122N) was created by EC Engineering from Kraków.

=== Interior ===
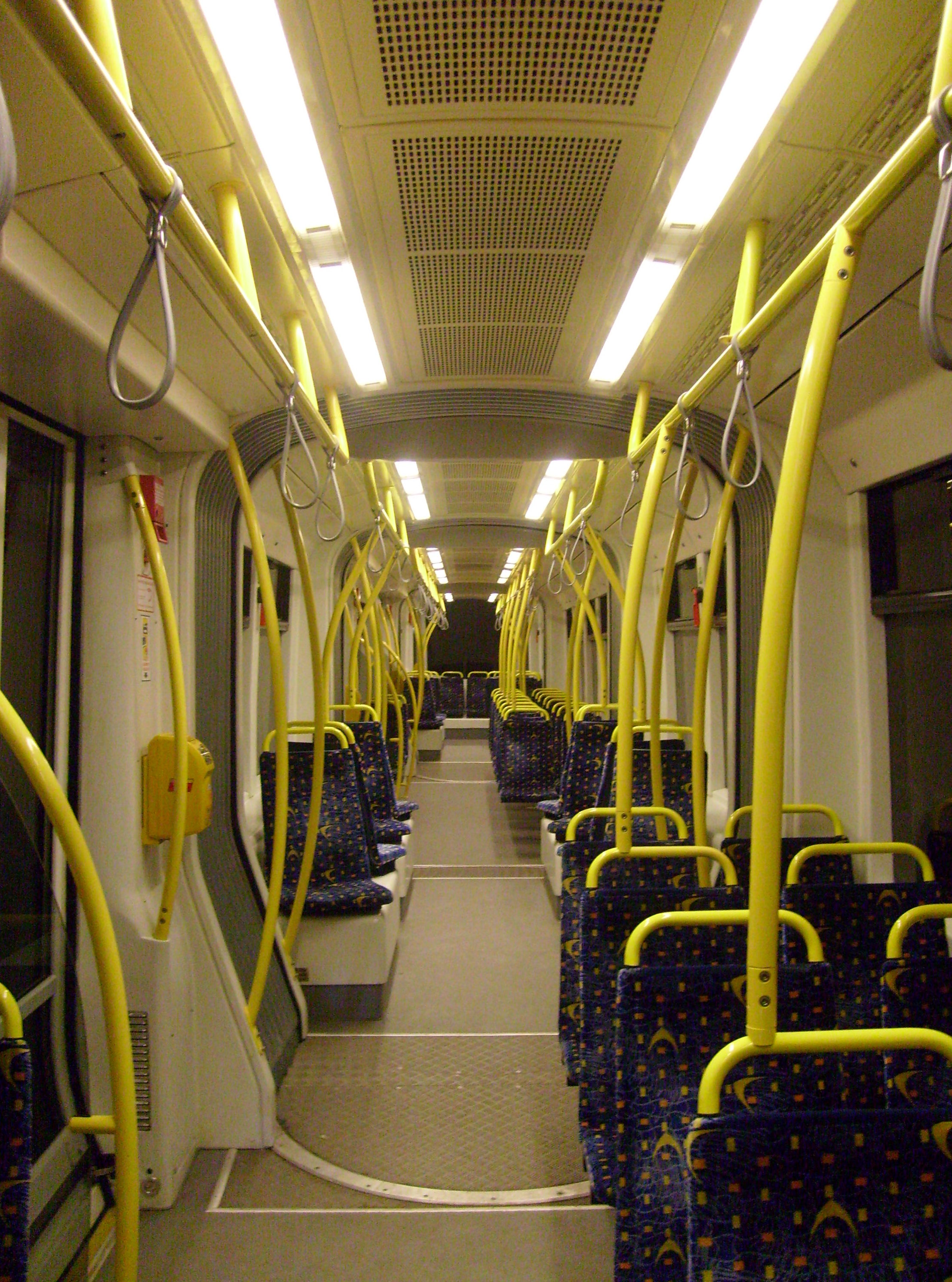
Passenger compartment

The Tramicus trams are fully low-floor. The passenger compartment is a single-space, step-free area (maximum floor slope of 9°), equipped with electric information and direction boards. Inside the vehicle, the seats are arranged in a 2+1 configuration (in the direction of travel) in the suspended sections, and at an angle in a 1+1 configuration in the sections with bogies. The narrowest passage is 595 mm wide. The trams have air conditioning in the driver's cabin (cooling capacity of 5.1 kW), and the 120N and 122N models also have air conditioning in the passenger compartment (cooling capacity of 22 kW). The vehicles are adapted for wheelchair users with a retractable ramp and designated space.

=== Power supply ===
The tram is powered by a 600 V DC network via a half-current collector (type Fb 700, manufactured by Stemmann) mounted on the roof of the first section. The voltage from the current collector is supplied through a disconnector and a quick-release switch to the high-voltage distribution board (type RWN-500-600, manufactured by Medcom). Inside it is a set of protection devices and contactors controlling the power supply to the vehicle's components.

Four power inverters (one for each motor, type FT-105-600, manufactured by Medcom) are used to supply the traction motors, generating three variable amplitude and frequency voltages using a transistor bridge circuit (IGBT). The inverters are controlled by a digital signal processor using pulse-width modulation.

In the 121N, the remaining devices are powered by a single voltage converter (type PSM-18, manufactured by Medcom), while the 120N and 122N models, which include additional air conditioning for the passenger compartment, require a second voltage converter (type PSM-60, manufactured by Medcom). This setup provides a backup power system for auxiliary circuits, which automatically activates in the event of a primary converter failure. Voltage converters produce 24 V DC (onboard) and 3x400 V AC (auxiliary) voltages.

=== Drive and braking ===
Tramicus trams have two driving bogies (end bogies), type 10NN (120N) or 12NN (121N and 122N). The trailer bogies mounted in the 120N are type 11NN, and those in the 122N are type 13NN. The bogies are manufactured by Pesa.

Each axle of the driving bogies is connected via axle transmission (type KSH 212, manufactured by Voith) to an induction motor (type DKCBZ 0211-4, manufactured by VEM Sachsenwerk). An important feature is the ability to power the traction motors from a 24 V battery to move the vehicle in emergency situations.

Service braking is achieved through electrodynamic brakes, which allow safe stopping even when the tram enters a closed section of the overhead wire. During electrodynamic braking, energy recovery is possible, which must be used by another tram or absorbed by a suitably equipped traction substation. Otherwise, upon reaching 780 V in the overhead wire, a braking chopper is activated to dissipate excess energy in braking resistors (RH: 2.4 W, 250 kW). The trailer bogies are equipped with active disc brakes (braked with increased hydraulic pressure), which complement electrodynamic braking if needed. Each axle of the driving bogies has a passive disc brake (spring-based force) used as a parking brake. All bogies are equipped with track brakes. In emergency situations, all types of brakes are used simultaneously.

=== Control computer ===
The drive system and other components are managed via a CAN bus by a computer located in the first section of the tram. Key information about system operations and potential faults is displayed on the driver's dashboard panel. Remote access to the computer is possible via GPRS protocol.

The Tramicus trams use a digital speed measurement and rail vehicle parameter recording system, ATM-RPS (manufactured by ATM PP).

=== Technical specifications of components ===
==== Auxiliary converters ====
Type	PSM-18	PSM-60
Input voltage	40–900 V	
Functionality range	360–1,000 V	
Total power	22 kVA	60 kVA
DC output	24 V, In=390 A: Thermal voltage compensation; Electronic protection (overload, short circuit)	
Voltage stability DC	<1%	
DC ripple	<1 Vpp (at nominal load)	
AC output	3x400 V/12 kVA	3x400 V/50 kVA
AC voltage regulation	≤±5%	
Max neutral conductor current	15 A	38 A
Overall efficiency	>92%	
Ambient temperature	-30 °C to +40 °C	
Enclosure IP code	IP30	
Dimensions (mm³)	450x1,300x620	450x1,300x1200

==== Traction motor ====
Type	DKCBZ 0211-4FA		
Operating point	S1	S2-1h	
Rated power	105	140	kW
Rated torque	563.3	754.1	Nm
Rated speed	1,681	1,772	rpm
Max speed	4,569		rpm
Rated frequency	60		Hz
Rated voltage	430		V
Stator connection	star		
Ampacity	190.0	238.2	A
Power factor (cos φ)	0.7948	0.8473	
Efficiency	93.33	93.15	%
Weight	400±5%		kg
IP code	IP55/IP65		
Ambient temperature	-30 to +40		°C
Insulation class	200		
Cooling method	self-ventilated, IC411		

Traction inverter

Type	FT-105-600	
Rated supply voltage	600 V +25%/-30%	600 V +30%/-30%
Auxiliary voltage (DC)	24 V +10%/-40%	24 V +30%/-40%
Ampacity	300 A	200 Arms
Phase output current	190 Arms	
Max current		400 Arms
Rated power	105 kW	100 kW
Frequency	0–160 Hz	0–130 Hz
PWM frequency	3 kHz	
Insulation strength	4 kV, 50 Hz for 1 min	4 kV
Cooling	forced internal	forced air
Weight	400 kg	60 kg
Dimensions (mm³)	1,200x450x1,300	1,296x450x1,320
Sources		

==== Transmission ====
Type	KSH 212
Gear ratio	6.643
Max speed	4,569 rpm

== Operations ==
Country	City	Operator	Type	Years of delivery	Number	Source
Poland	Elbląg	Urban Transport Authority in Elbląg	121N	2006–2007	6	
Poland	Warsaw	Warsaw Trams	120N	2007	15	
Poland	Łódź	Municipal Transport Company in Łódź	122N	2008	10	
Poland	Bydgoszcz	Municipal Transport Company in Bydgoszcz	122N	2008	2	
Total:					33	

=== Elbląg ===
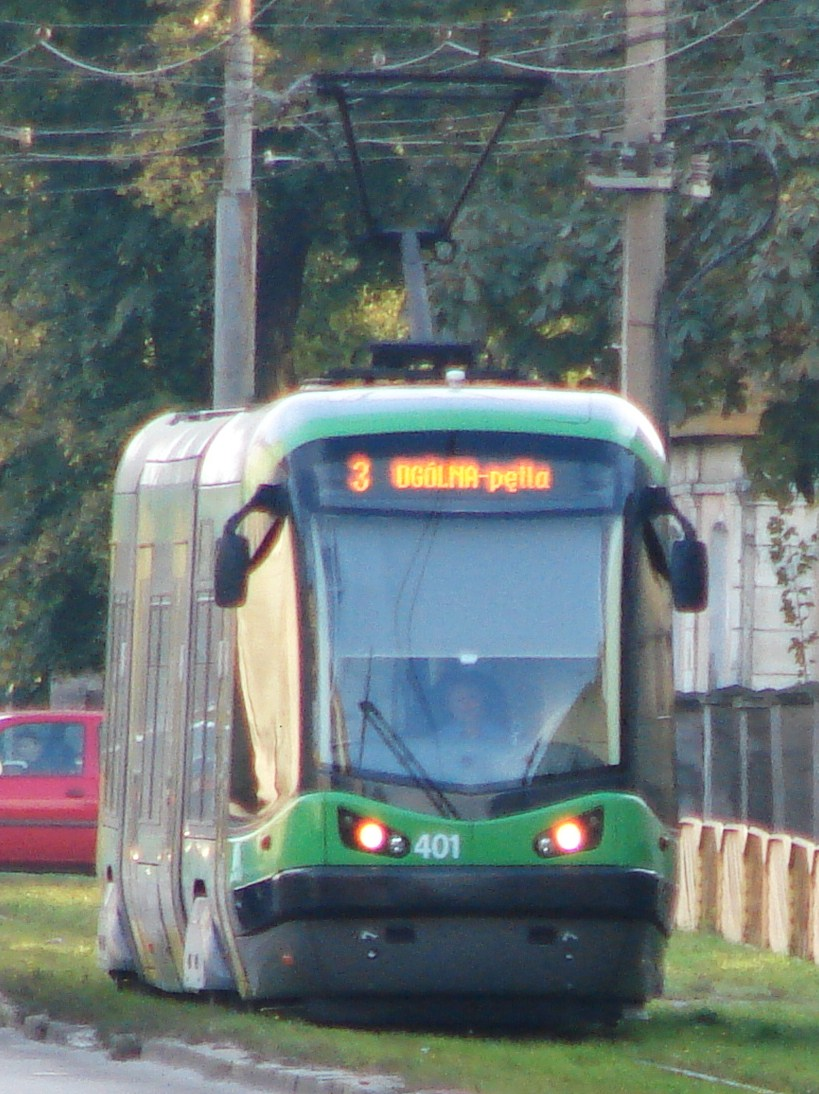
121N in Elblągu

A contract with the Elbląg City Office for the purchase of 6 low-floor 121N trams from Pesa for the municipal company Elbląg Trams was signed on 11 August 2005. The premiere of the tram produced for Elbląg took place from 19 to 22 September 2006 at the InnoTrans trade fair in Berlin. The first 121N was delivered to the customer in October 2006 and introduced into service on 21 December 2006. On the same day, trams began operating to the new terminus at Ogólna Street in Elbląg. The Tramicus were initially intended to serve line 4, but frequent derailments on the track on Grunwaldzka Avenue led to their reassignment to other routes, specifically lines 3 and 5 running from Ogólna terminus to Saperów terminus. The last 121N was delivered in March 2007.

The Tramicus trams were the first low-floor trams in Elbląg.

On 30 August 2011, vehicle number 404 was severely damaged in a collision with a truck. The tram was repaired at the manufacturer's plant in Bydgoszcz and returned to Elbląg on 20 January 2012.

On 20 June 2012, tram number 401 was named Stanisław Wójcicki, honoring an honorary citizen of Elbląg. The remaining five 121N trams were named Ferdinand Schichau, Włodzimierz Sierzputowski, Aleksandra Gabrysiak, Czesław Klimuszko, and Józef Karpiński. The names were chosen in a vote.

=== Warsaw ===
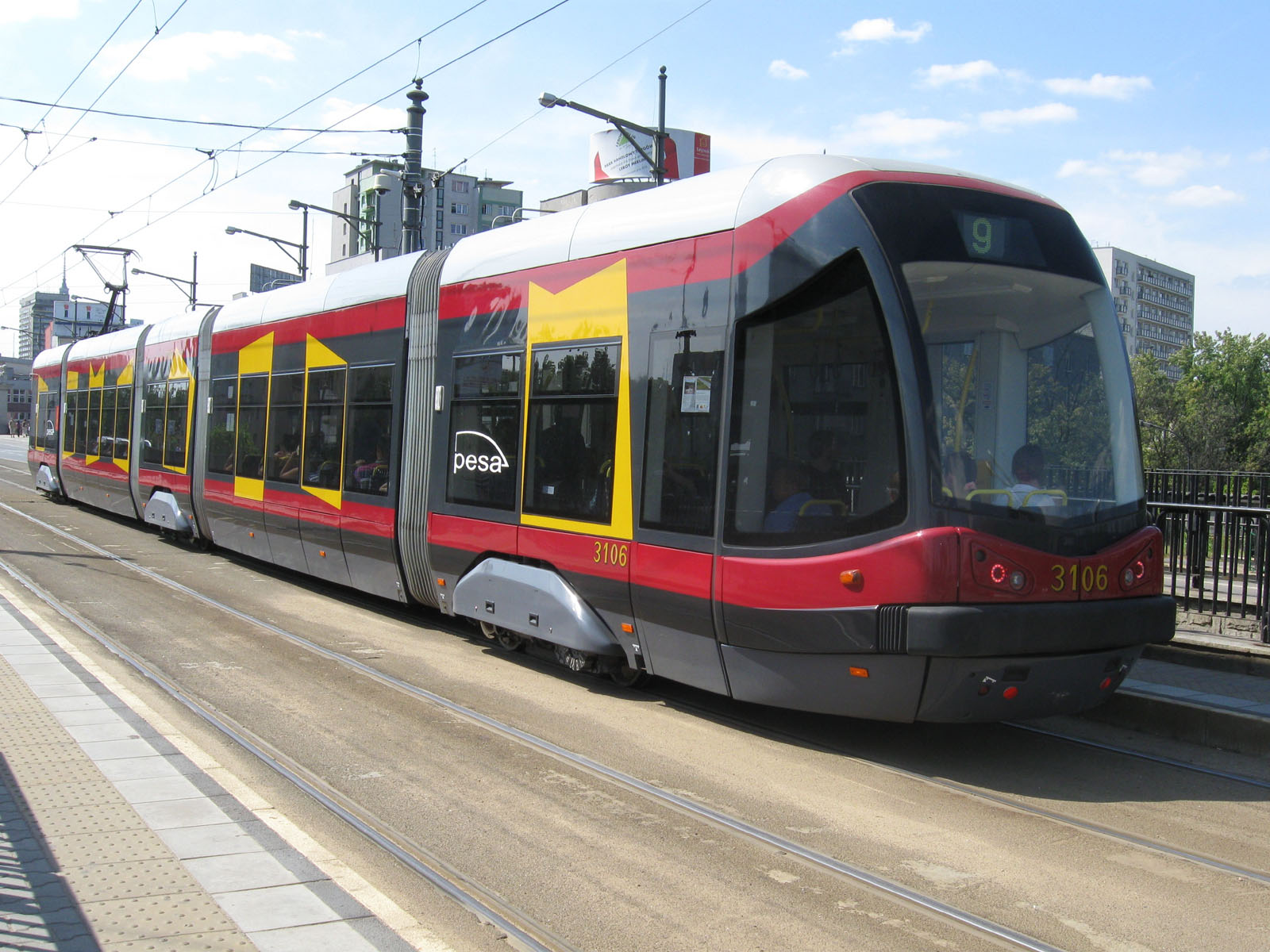
120N in initial livery

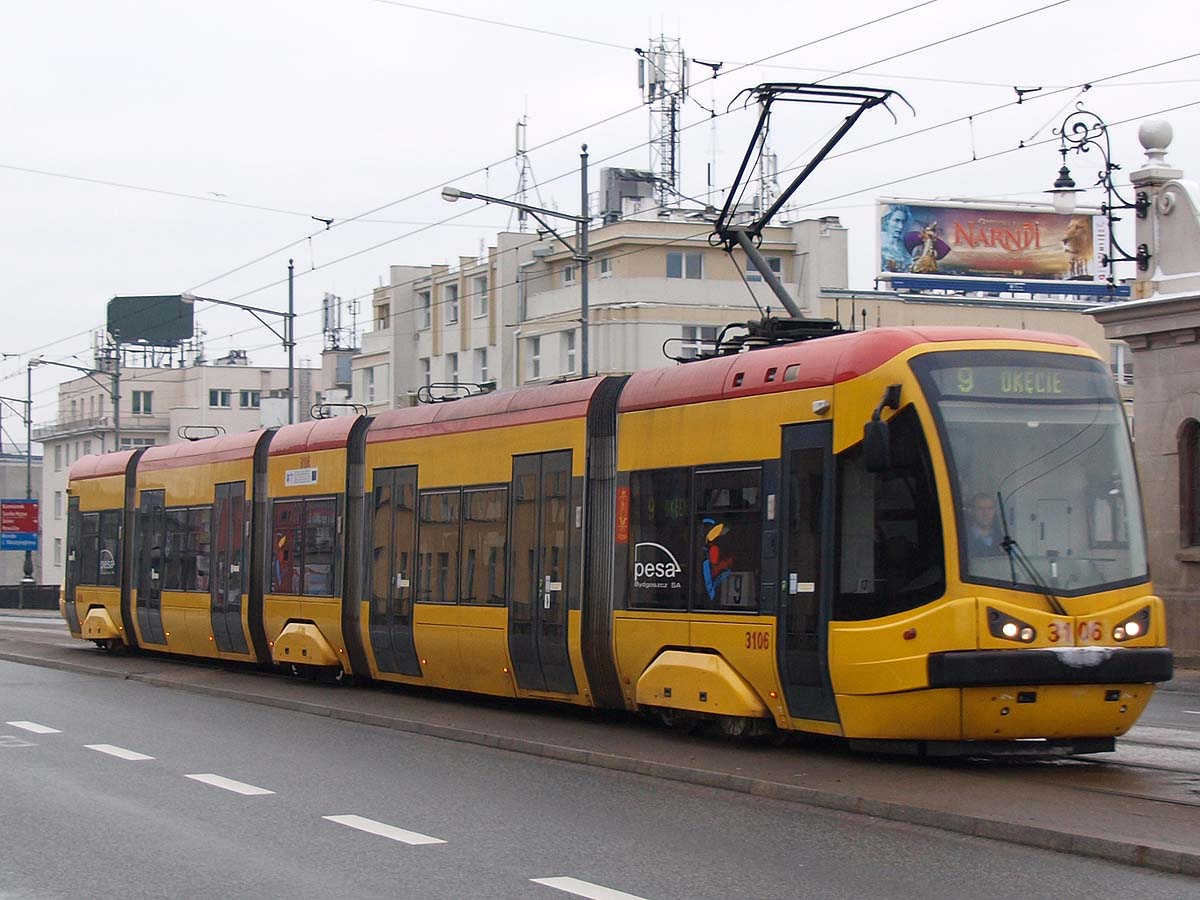
120N in final livery

On 22 February 2006, a contract was signed for the delivery of 15 brand-new Pesa 120N trams. These trams were purchased by Warsaw for Warsaw Trams as part of the project Modernization of the tram route in Jerozolimskie Avenue from Banacha terminus to Gocławek terminus, co-financed by the European Union under the Integrated Regional Operational Programme.

On 16 July 2007, the first 120N was delivered to Warsaw by truck. The tram was unloaded at the depot in Wola and then transported to the depot in Mokotów. Testing of the tram began two days later. The delivery of new trams marked the centenary of electric trams in Warsaw. On 20 August 2007, the first 120N was presented at the Mokotów depot and then put into service on line 36. The purchase of trams with EU funds required their use only on tracks modernized as part of the same project (corresponding to line 9). However, due to delays in track work, Warsaw Trams obtained permission to temporarily assign these trams to other routes. The 120N was the first air-conditioned tram in Warsaw.

On 16 March 2018, a fault was detected in one of the three braking systems – electrodynamic braking. As a result, all Tramicus trams were temporarily withdrawn from service. All trams received new software and were subjected to re-testing.

In November 2018, Warsaw Trams signed a contract with the Polish Mint for the delivery of new ticket machines for all trams.

==== Livery ====
Trams were delivered to Warsaw in a red-gray-black livery with yellow rectangles. This design was chosen by Warsaw Trams and Pesa employees. It referred to the traditional red-yellow colors of Warsaw trams and the painting scheme of the 121N for Elbląg (door frames). In 2009, a commission of city officials, looking for a suitable painting scheme for 186 newly ordered trams, decided to change it to a gray livery with red accents. The repainting, covered under the paint warranty, was commissioned to the manufacturer. The first tram to return to Warsaw in the new colors was tram number 3113 in mid-July 2009. However, the modification was criticized by passengers and journalists, leading to another color change. By the end of July of the same year, tram 3103 was repainted yellow with a red stripe along the roof line. This livery was then applied to the remaining Warsaw Tramicus trams and adapted for the later ordered Pesa Swing trams.

=== Łódź ===
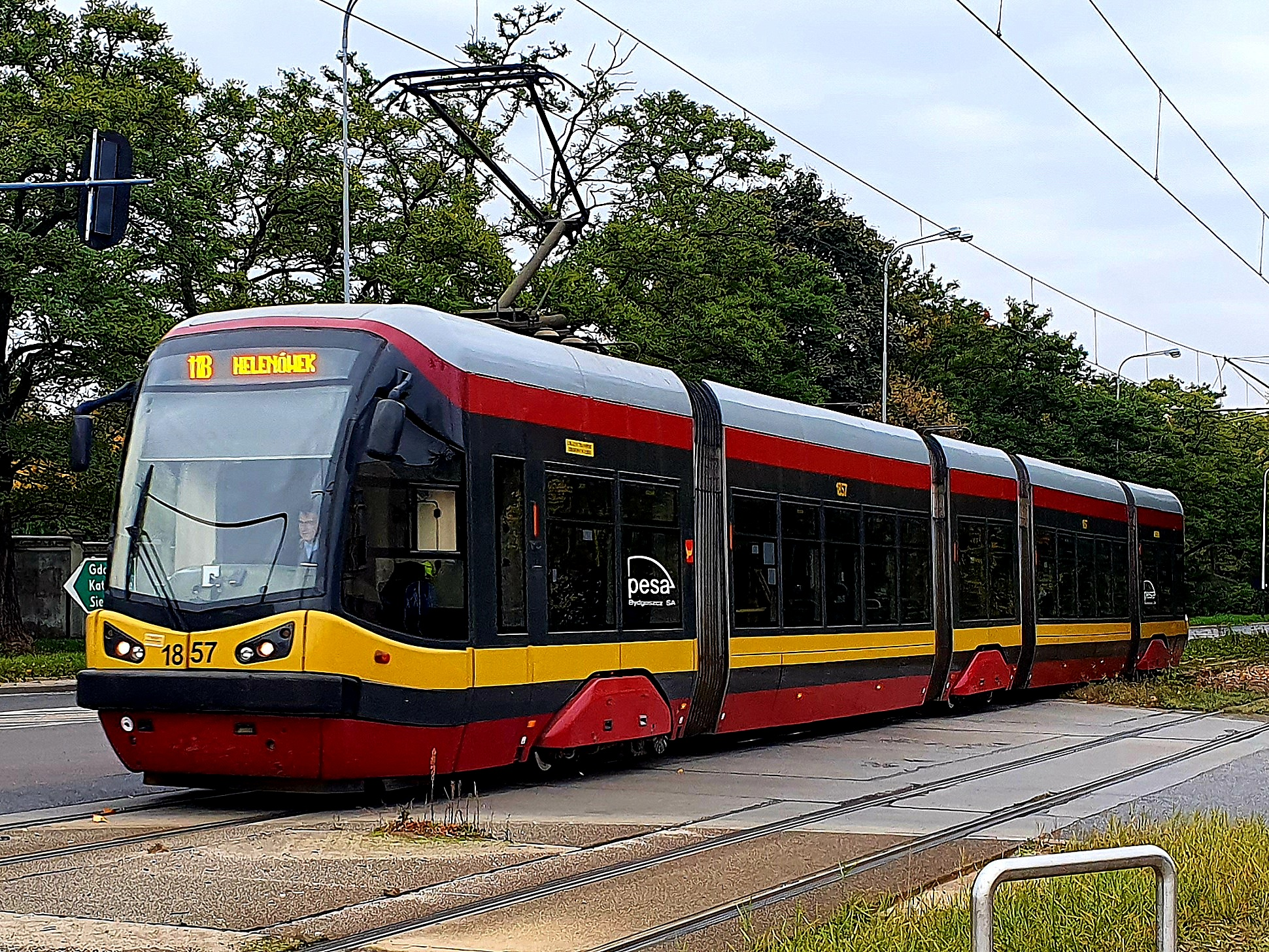
Łódź 122N

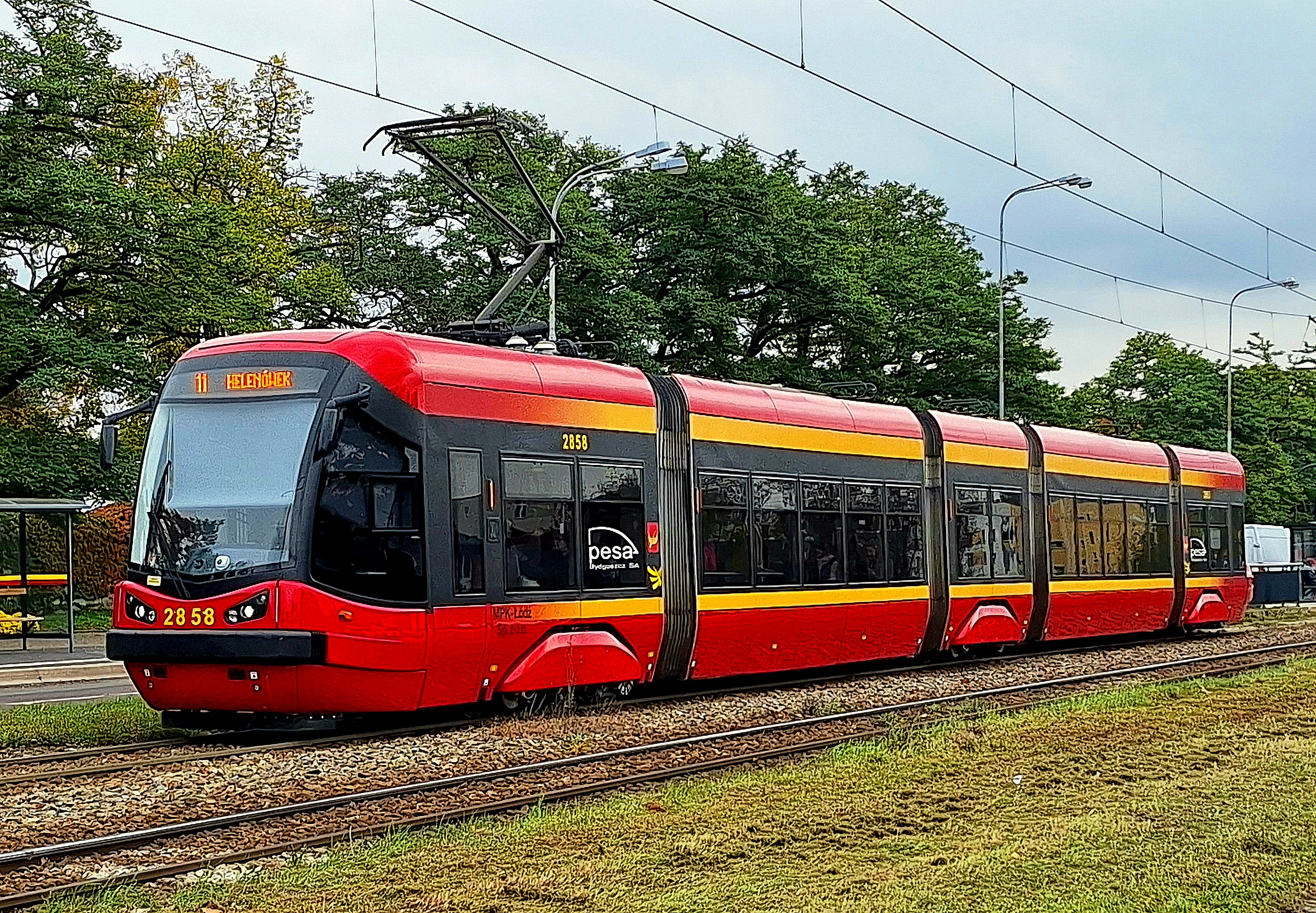
Modernized 122N

In Łódź, the 122N trams are operated by the Municipal Transport Company in Łódź. The Tramicuses were purchased to serve the modernized Łódź Regional Tram Line from 2007 to 2008 based on a contract signed on 24 October 2006. The first Pesa tram arrived in Łódź on 25 January 2008, and after testing and trial runs, it was officially presented and handed over to the operator on 28 January 2008. The delivery coincided with the opening of the Łódź Regional Tram Line. The trams from Bydgoszcz were assigned to serve the main line of this system, line 11. To enable localization, the trams were equipped with a GPS-based tracking system.

By the end of 2015, Municipal Transport Company upgraded the trams with wireless internet.

Between 2019 and 2020, a replacement of the bogies began on tram number 1853, which had been out of service since 2014 due to bogie failure.

In October 2023, a tram numbered 2858, modernized by the Municipal Transport Company itself, took to the tracks. The modernization included updates to the disc brake mechanical system, lighting, passenger information system, monitoring, and paintwork.

=== Bydgoszcz ===
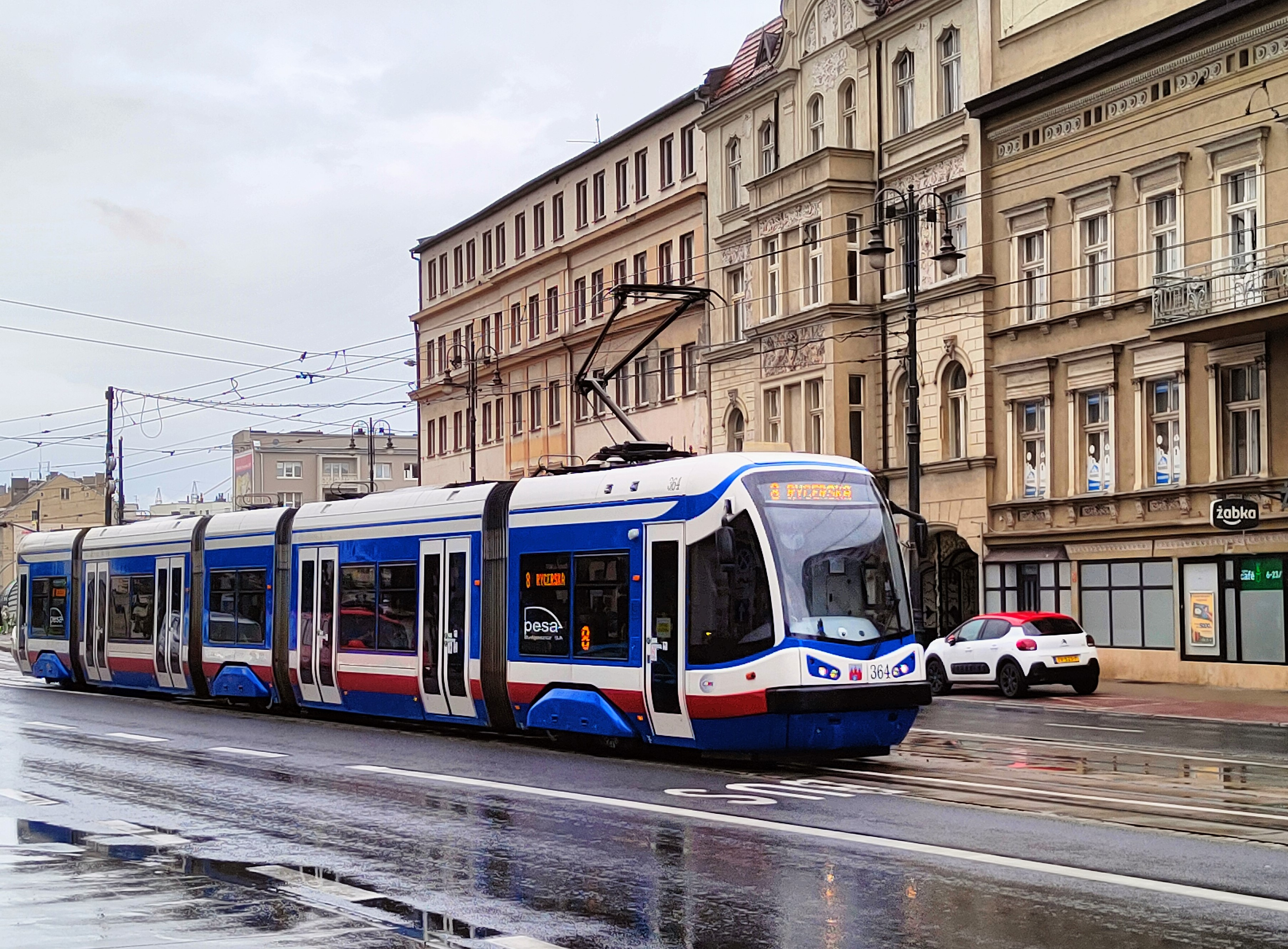
122N in Bydgoszcz

The Pesa 122N trams are also part of the fleet of the Municipal Transport Company in Bydgoszcz. A contract for the delivery of 2 vehicles was signed on 12 September 2007, and the first of the ordered units debuted on 12 February 2008. The delivery of the second tram marked the 120th anniversary of Bydgoszcz's municipal transportation. The Tramicuses, officially handed over to the Municipal Transport Company on 4 March 2008, were the first low-floor trams in the city. Initially, they were to serve line 3, but later, service assignments were adjusted so that these low-floor trams appeared across the network. From 23 to 26 September 2008, a Pesa 122N tram belonging to the Municipal Transport Company (side number 365) was loaned by the manufacturer for the InnoTrans trade fair in Berlin.

Trials of trams delivered to Łódź also took place in Bydgoszcz.
