= Trams in Bydgoszcz =

Tram system in Poland

- Tramwaje w Bydgoszczy

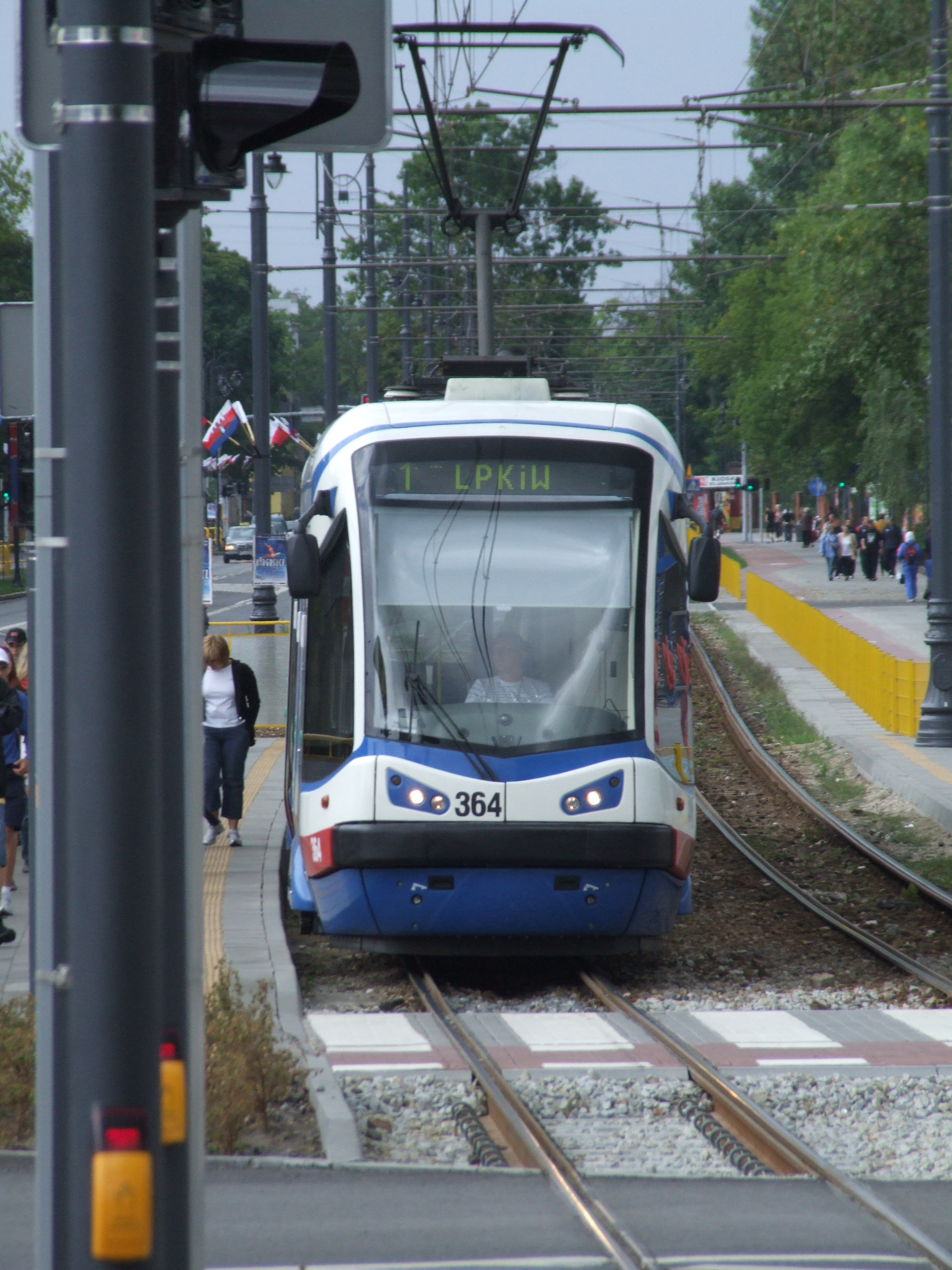
- PESA 122N tram in Bydgoszcz

Operation
- Locale: Bydgoszcz, Poland
- Open: 18 May 1888
- Lines: 11
- Operator: MZK Bydgoszcz

Infrastructure
- Track gauge: 1,000 mm (3 ft 3 3/8 in)

Statistics
- Route length: 40.8 km (25.4 mi)
Overview
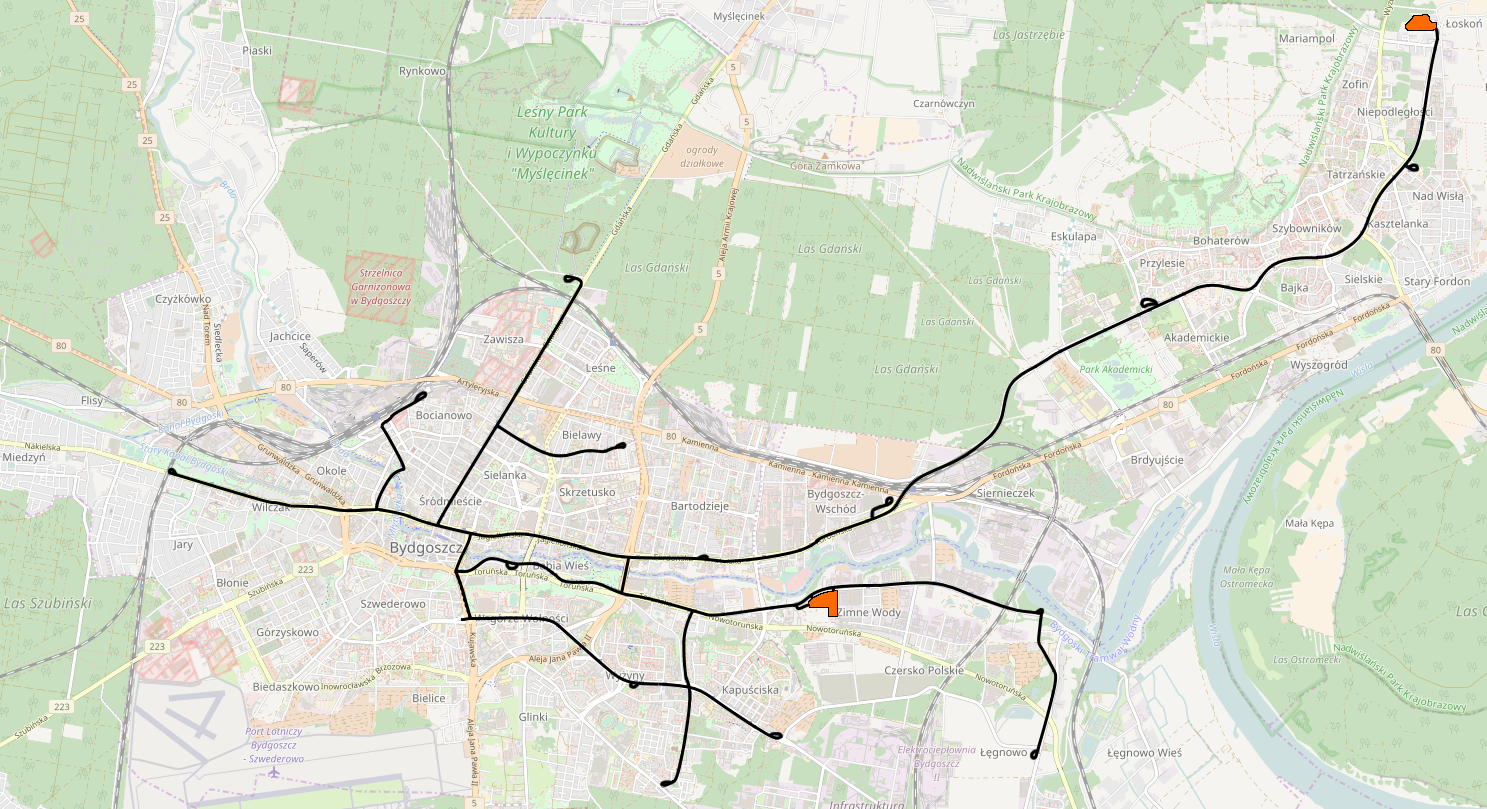
- Website: http://www.mzk.bydgoszcz.pl/

Trams in Bydgoszcz is a tram system in Bydgoszcz, Poland that has been in operation since 1888. The system is currently operated by Miejskie Zakłady Komunikacyjne w Bydgoszczy. There are 11 lines with a total line length of 128.05 kilometres (79.57 mi). The system uses 1,000 mm (3 ft 3 3/8 in) metre gauge.

== History ==
=== Horse Tram ===
On 1 February 1888, Ingeniueur Havestadt und Contag first began running a horse-drawn tram line between the Bydgoszcz Main Railway Station and Zbożowy Rynek. 4 years later, In 1892, another horse tram line opened from Koszary Artyleryiskie to Poznańska.

In late 1895, Allgemeine Elektricitäts-Gesellschaft began preparations to electrify the entire tram line. On 3 July 1896, the first electric tram ran on the Bydgoszcz Tram Network.

=== 1900–1945 ===
From 1900 to 1901, German Authorities in Bydgoszcz (Then Bromberg) constructed a third electrified tram line on Jagiellońska Street. After this construction, the entire tram network did not receive any major upgrades or extensions until 1936.

After The Great War, the city of Bydgoszcz fell under the control of the Polish Authorities, and in 1928, the operations of the tram were taken over by the Polish Government. In 1936, a new tram line from Gdanska Street to Bielawny was completed.

The tram network was taken over by German authorities in 1939 after the invasion of Poland, and the Tram network ran as usual until the end of the Second World War. The tram networks were briefly put out of operation after the Red Army took control of the city, However, the entire tram network resumed service before the end of 1945.

=== 1945–1991 ===
In 1949, a small extension of the tram network was built to Spital Jurasza (The City Hospital). The following year, in 1950, the Western Terminus of the line was extended to Wilczak, where it remains today.

On July 21, 1953, the largest extension of the tram network was opened, 5 New tram lines were opened south of the Brda river. This tram extension finally linked the majority of the southern side of Bydgoszcz to the northern side. In 1955 and 1957, respectively, new extensions were opened on Gdanska Street and Fordonska Street. In 1959, a new depot was completed on Toruńska Street.

In 1969, the tram network was extended to Bydgoszcz Wshod train Station in the east.

In 1970, Construction of a new bridge carrying tram tracks was completed across the Brda river, the Bridge Pomorski. In 1974, Trams were rerouted out of the historical centre of the city. Also in 1974, the tram line to the city hospital was permanently closed. In 1975 a short extension in the southern side of the city to Magnuszewska Street was completed.

In 1980, The tram network received shipments of Konstal 805Na Trams, Many of these trams still run on the network in the present day. In 1984, an extension of the southern network to Rondo Kujaskie was completed, and in 1989, The extension to the northernmost part of the line (Excluding Fordon) was completed when the network on Gdanska street was extended to Las Gdanski.

=== 1992–present ===
In 1994, MZK Bydgoszcz took over operation of the Tram Network.

In 1998, Tram traffic to the Main Station was closed. This line was rebuilt and reopened in 2012.

== Lines ==
| Daily | 2, 3, 4, 5, 6, 8, 9, 10, 11 |
| Weekdays only | 1, 7 |

| Line | Map | Route | Length [km] | Travel time [min] | Frequency [min] | Stations |
|---|---|---|---|---|---|---|
| 1 | | Las Gdański ↔ Wilczak Gdańska – Focha – Nakielska | 6,7 | 20 | From Monday to Friday: 20 | 17/16 |
| 2 | | Las Gdański ↔ Kapuściska Gdańska – Jagiellońska – Bernardyńska – Kujawska – Wojska Polskiego | 10,4 | 28–30 | From Monday to Friday: 20; Weekends and public holidays: 30 | 22 |
| 3 | | Wilczak ↔ Łoskoń Nakielska – Focha – Jagiellońska – Fordońska – wiadukt Dworzec Wschód – Lewińskiego – Akademicka – Andersa | 18,3 | 45–46 | From Monday to Friday: 20; Weekends and public holidays: 30 | 30/28 |
| 4 | | Bielawy ↔ Glinki Chodkiewicza – Gdańska – Jagiellońska – Most Pomorski – Toruńska – Perłowa – Bełzy – Szpitalna | 8,6 | 30 | From Monday to Friday: 10/20; Weekends and public holidays: 30 | 18 |
| 5 | | Łoskoń ↔ Rycerska Andersa – Akademicka – Lewińskiego – wiadukt Dworzec Wschód – Fordońska – Jagiellońska – Focha – Dworcowa – Dworzec Główny | 18,2 | 43 | From Monday to Friday: 10/20; Weekends and public holidays: 30 | 28/25 |
| 6 | | Bielawy ↔ Łęgnowo Chodkiewicza – Gdańska – Jagiellońska – Bernardyńska – Toruńska – Spadzista – Hutnicza | 12,45 | 38–42 | From Monday to Friday: 20; Weekends and public holidays: 30 | 26 |
| 7 | | Łoskoń ↔ Kapuściska Andersa – Akademicka – Lewińskiego – wiadukt Dworzec Wschód – Fordońska – Most Kazimierza Wielkiego – Toruńska – Perłowa – Bełzy – Wojska Polskiego | 14,4 | 34–35 | From Monday to Friday: 20 | 21 |
| 8 | | Rycerska ↔ Kapuściska Dworzec Główny – Dworcowa – Focha – Jagiellońska – Most Pomorski – Toruńska – Perłowa – Bełzy – Wojska Polskiego | 8,0 | 27–28 | From Monday to Friday: 20; Weekends and public holidays: 30 | 17/15 |
| 9 | | Glinki ↔ Rycerska Szpitalna – Wojska Polskiego – Kujawska – Bernardyńska – Jagiellońska – Focha – Dworcowa | 7,6 | 30 | From Monday to Friday: 20Weekends and public holidays: 30 | 17 |
| 10 | | Las Gdański ↔ Niepodległości Gdańska – Jagiellońska – Fordońska – wiadukt Dworzec Wschód – Lewińskiego – Akademicka – Andersa | 17,0 | 42–44 | From Monday to Friday: 20; Weekends and public holidays: 30 | 27/26 |
| 11 | | Niepodległości ↔ Bielawy Andersa – Akademicka – Lewińskiego – wiadukt Dworzec Wschód – Fordońska – Most Kazimierza Wielkiego – Toruńska – Perłowa – Bełzy – Wojska Polskiego – Kujawska – Bernardyńska – Jagiellońska – Gdańska – Chodkiewicza | 30,2 | 55–60 | From Monday to Friday: 20; Weekends and public holidays: 30 | ≈40 (depending on the route variant) |

== Rolling Stock ==
=== Normal ===
| Image | Tramway type | Number | Operation | Low floor | Ref. |
|---|---|---|---|---|---|
| | 805Na | 98 | 1980 | 0% | |
| | 805Nm | 2 | 2003 (modernised 805Na) | 0% | |
| | 122N Tramicus | 2 | 2008 | 100% | |
| | 122NaB Swing | 27 | 2014 | 100% | |
| | 121NaB Swing | 6 | 2017 | 100% | |

=== Historical ===
| Image | Tramway type | Number | Operation | Renovation | Ref. |
|---|---|---|---|---|---|
| | Konstal 5N | 1 | 1960 | 2017 | |
| | Konstal 5ND | 1 | 1960 | 2016 | |
| | Herbrand VNB-125 | 1 | 1896 | 2012 | |
| | Herbrand GE68 | 1 | 1898 | 1986–1988 | |
| | Konstal 803N | 1 | 1974 | | |
