= Pesa 120N =

Polish-designed light rail vehicle

PESA Tramicus 120N
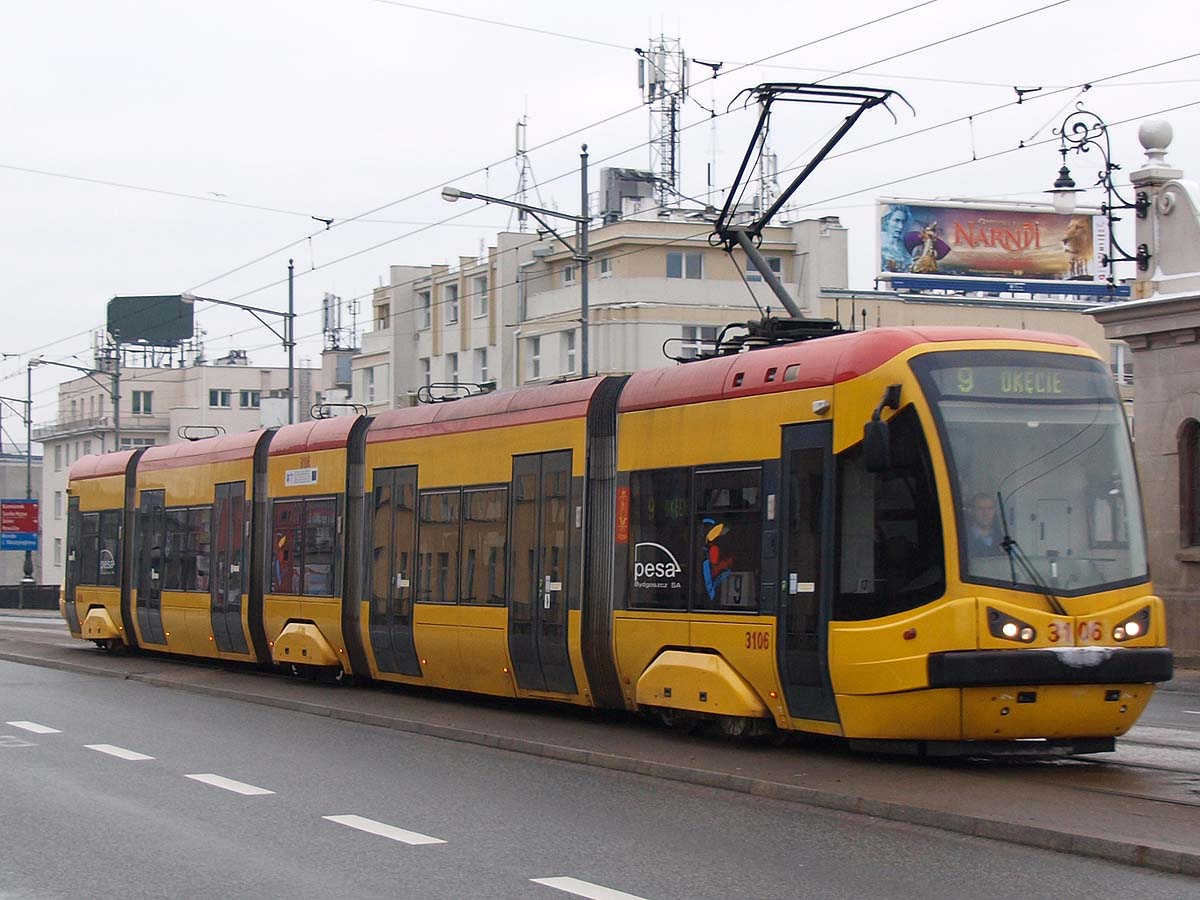
- Pesa 120N
- Manufacturer: PESA
- Constructed: 2006—present
- Successor: PESA 120Na
- Capacity: 63 (Seated); 148 (Standing)

Specifications
- Train length: 31.82 m (104 ft 5 in)
- Width: 2.35 m (7 ft 9 in)
- Height: 3.4 m (11 ft 2 in)
- Floor height: 350 mm (14 in)
- Low-floor: 100%
- Articulated sections: 5
- Maximum speed: 70 km/h (45 mph)
- Power output: 420 kW (4 x 105 kW)
- Bogies: fixed
- Track gauge: 1,435 mm (4 ft 8 1/2 in)

PESA 120N is a tram produced by the Polish company PESA in Bydgoszcz. It is part of the Tramicus range and has a fully low-floor design.

They are currently used by Warsaw Tramway in Warsaw and operate on lines 9, 15 and 17. Currently 15 trams 120N are in service in Warsaw. In 2009, a newer model of the tram, called 120Na was ordered by Warsaw in quantity of 186. These were delivered between 2010–2013.

== Production ==
	City	Year	Number
(Poland)	Warsaw	2007	15
	Total		15

== See also ==
- Pesa Tramicus
