= Pesa Swing =

Tram model

PESA Swing
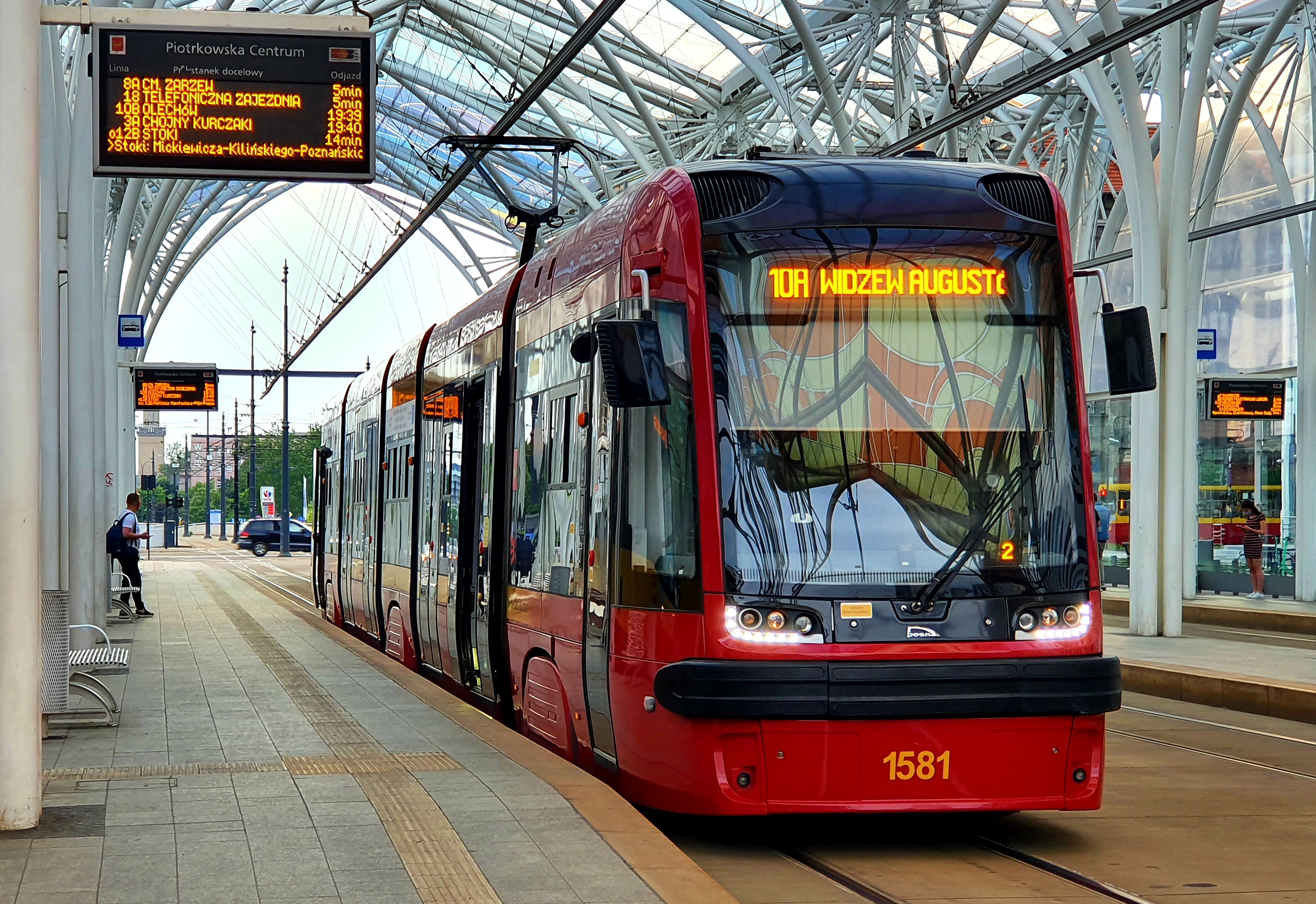
- Manufacturer: PESA
- Constructed: 2009—present
- Predecessor: PESA 120N
- Capacity: 40 (Seated); 161 (Standing)

Specifications
- Train length: 30,120 mm (98 ft 10 in)
- Width: 2,350 mm (7 ft 9 in)
- Height: 3,400 mm (11 ft 2 in)
- Floor height: 350 mm (14 in)
- Low-floor: 100%
- Articulated sections: 3 or 5 body sections
- Maximum speed: 70 km/h (45 mph)
- Weight: 41,640 kg (91,800 lb) (122NaJ)
- Power output: 420 kW (4 x 105 kW); 480 kW (4 x 120 kW) (122NaJ)
- Bogies: fixed
- Track gauge: 1,435 mm (4 ft 8 1/2 in); 1,000 mm (3 ft 3 3/8 in); 1,009 mm (3 ft 3 23/32 in) (Sofia)

PESA Swing is a tram manufactured by Polish company PESA in Bydgoszcz. It is a 100% low-floor, five-section vehicle based on the 120N model. The Swing is a tram of the multi-articulated type with sections connected by accordion-type pivot joints.

The first company to order PESA 120Na Swing trams was Warsaw Tramway, which ordered 186 units. The delivery started in summer 2010 and as of 2023 445 Pesa Swing trams were delivered to various cities across Europe, including Warsaw, Bydgoszcz, Gdańsk, Łódź, Szczecin, Toruń (Poland), Sofia (Bulgaria), Cluj-Napoca, Iași (Romania), Szeged (Hungary) and Kaliningrad (Russia).

== Operators ==
Country	City	Operator	Images	Units purchased
Poland	Bydgoszcz	MZK Bydgoszcz		33
Poland	Gdańsk	Gdansk Buses and Trams		35
Poland	Łódź	MPK Łódź		34
Poland	Szczecin	Szczecin Tramways		28
Poland	Toruń	MZK Toruń		23 out of 28
Poland	Warsaw	Warsaw Tramways		180 + 6 Duo
Bulgaria	Sofia	Stolichen Electrotransport EAD		67
Hungary	Szeged	SzKT		9
Romania	Cluj-Napoca	CTP Cluj-Napoca		4
Romania	Iași	CTP Iași		16
Russia	Kaliningrad	Kaliningrad-GorTrans		1
