= Pesa 121N =

Tram produced by the Polish company PESA

PESA Tramicus 121N
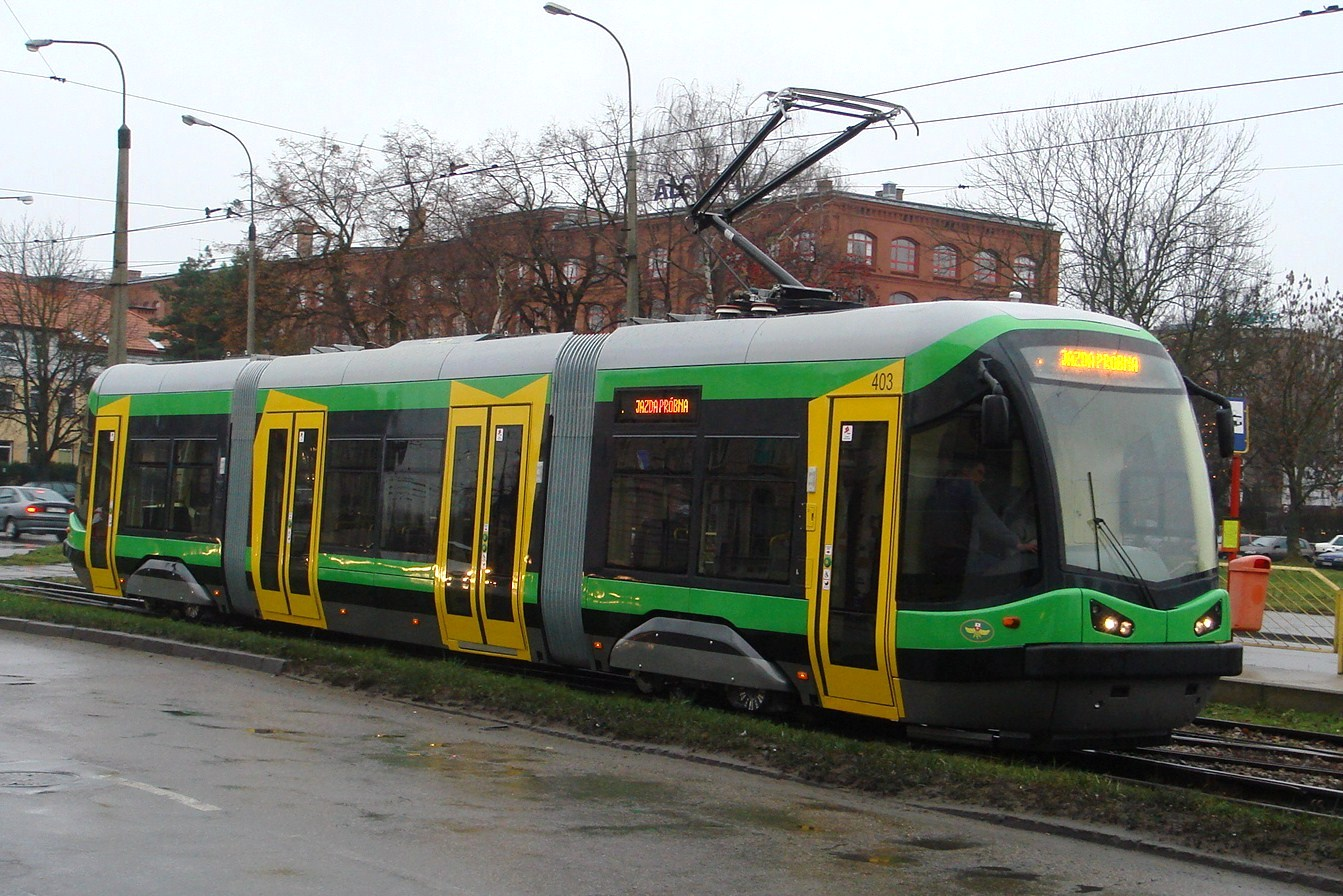
- PESA 121N, Elblag
- Manufacturer: PESA
- Constructed: 2005—2006
- Capacity: 41 (Seated); 81 (Standing)

Specifications
- Train length: 20.22 m (66 ft 4 in)
- Width: 2.35 m (7 ft 9 in)
- Height: 3.4 m (11 ft 2 in)
- Floor height: 350 mm (14 in)
- Low-floor: 100%
- Articulated sections: 3
- Maximum speed: 70 km/h (45 mph)
- Power output: 420 kW (4 x 105 kW)
- Bogies: fixed
- Track gauge: 1,000 mm (3 ft 3 3/8 in)

PESA 121N is a tram produced by the Polish company PESA in Bydgoszcz. It is part of the Tramicus range and has a fully low-floor design. The 121N trams are currently used only in Elbląg and are operated by ZKM Elbląg. Currently 6 vehicles of this type are in service.

== Production ==
	City	Year	Number
(Poland)	Elbląg	2006	6
	Total		6

== See also ==
- Pesa Tramicus
