= Pesa 122N =

PESA Tramicus 122N
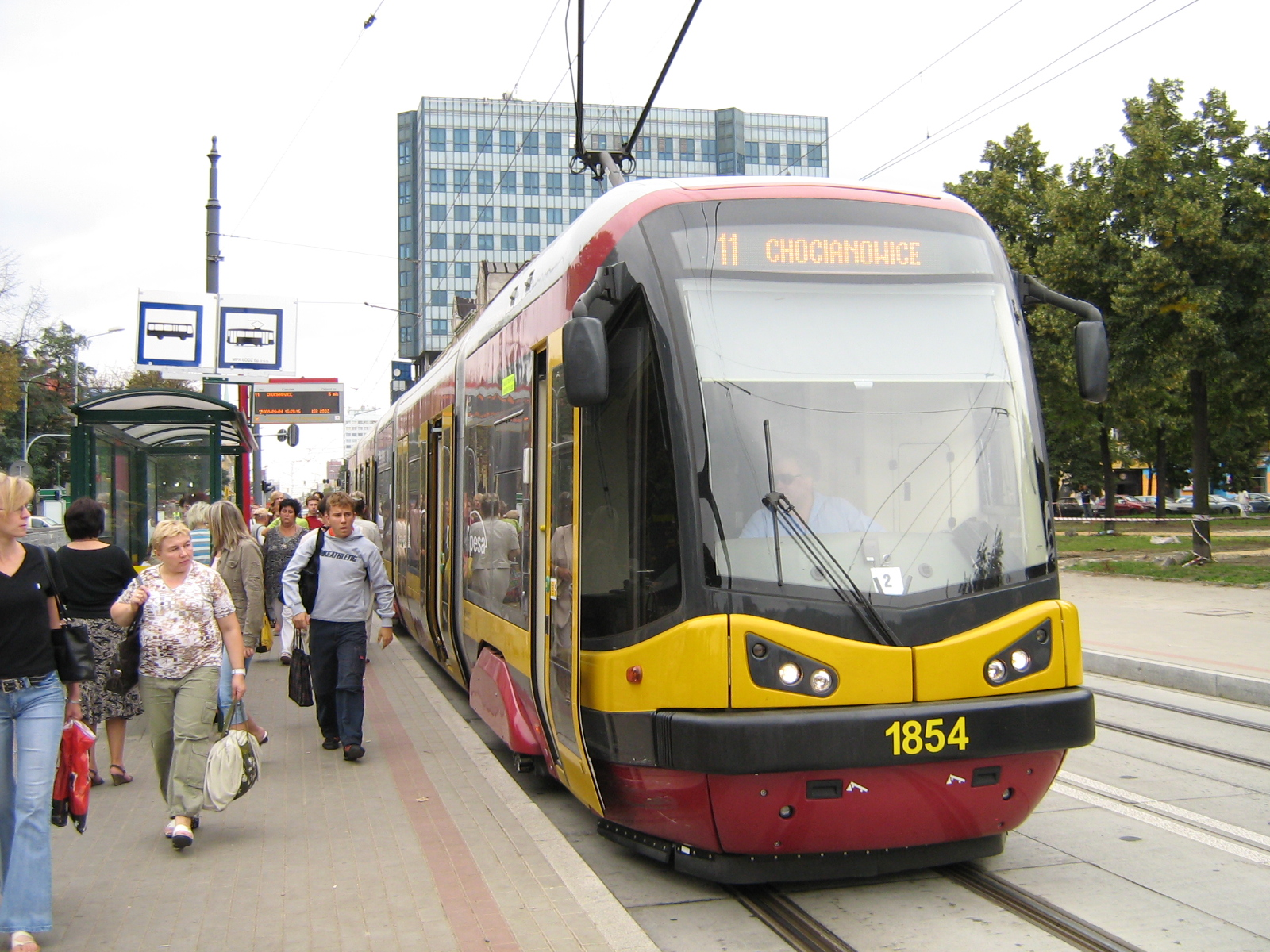
- Pesa Tramicus 122N in Łódź
- Manufacturer: PESA
- Constructed: 2008—present
- Capacity: 63 (Seated); 133/148 (Standing)

Specifications
- Train length: 31 820 mm
- Width: 2 350 mm
- Height: 3 400 mm
- Floor height: 350 mm
- Low-floor: 100%
- Articulated sections: 5
- Maximum speed: 70km/h
- Power output: 420 kW (4 x 105 kW)
- Wheels driven: 66% (8/12)
- Bogies: fixed
- Track gauge: 1 000 mm

PESA 122N is a tram produced by the Polish company PESA in Bydgoszcz. It is part of the Tramicus range and has a fully low-floor design. Currently the trams of this type are used in Łódź and Bydgoszcz. The vehicles also come with batteries, which allow them to travel 50 m in case of a power failure.

== Production ==
	City	Year	Number
(Poland)	Łódź	2008	10
(Poland)	Bydgoszcz	2008	2
Total		12	

== See also ==
- Pesa Tramicus
