= Trams in Elbląg =

Elbląg tramway network
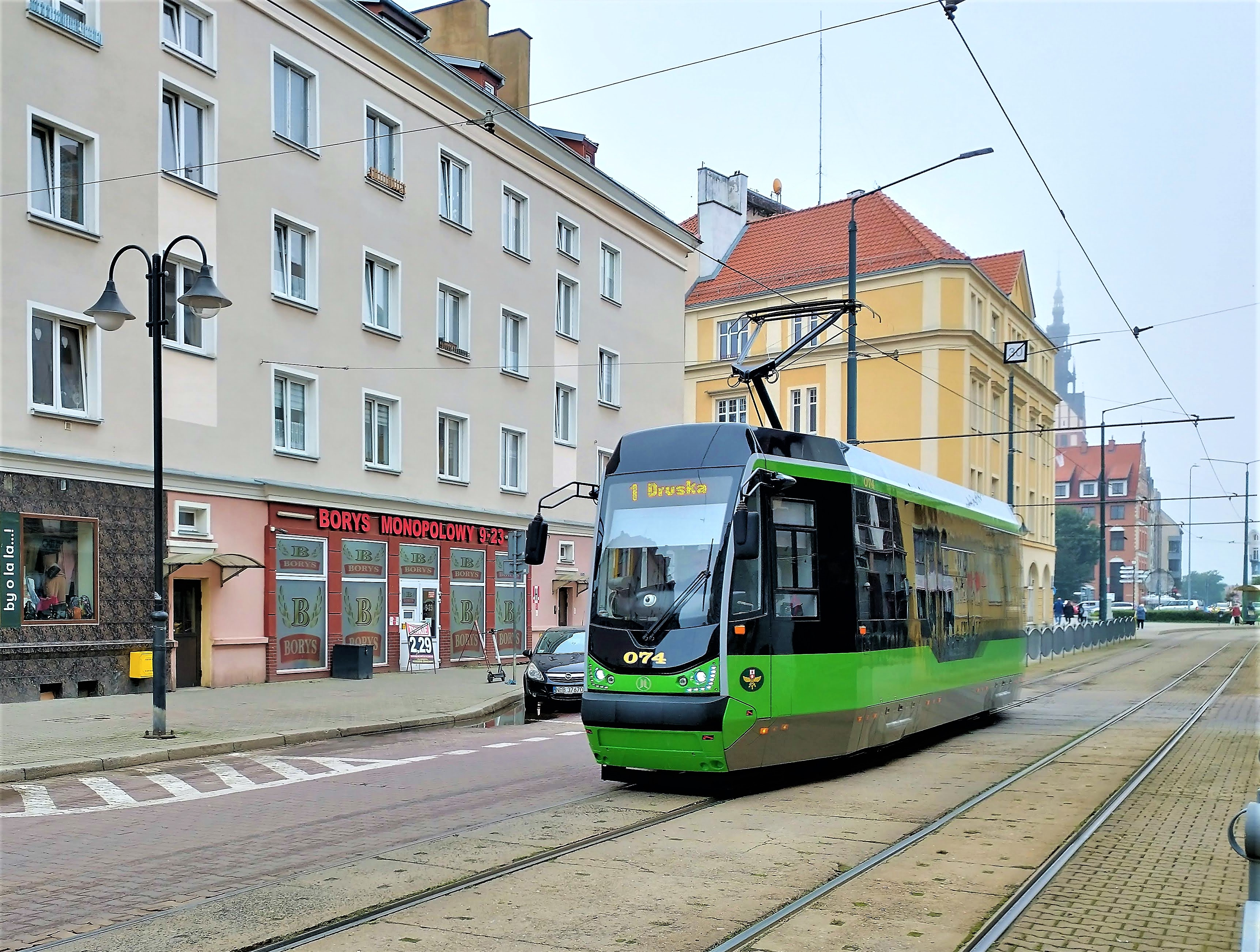
- Moderus Beta in on ul. 1 Maja

Operation
- Locale: Elbląg, Poland

Statistics
Electric trams era: 1895–present
- Status: Still operational
- Routes: 5
- Operator: ZKM Elbląg
- Track gauge: 1,000 mm (3 ft 3 3/8 in)
- Propulsion system: Electricity
- Electrification: 600 V DC overhead line
- Track length (total): 32 km (20 mi)
- Website: http://www.mzk.elblag.pl/ www.zkm.elblag.com.pl

The Elbląg tram system is the tram network in Elbląg, Poland. Operating since 1895, the system is operated by Tramwaje Elbląskie Sp. z o.o., and is integrated into the Zakład Komunikacji Miejskiej w Elblągu (ZKM Elbląg). The system currently has 5 lines with a total length of 32 kilometres (20 mi). Elbląg's tram network is the second oldest tram system in Poland (after Wrocław's). The system operates 33 trams, including 16 Konstal 805Na.

== History ==
The first two tram lines in Elbląg opened in 1895. These two lines linked the city's suburbs to the urban center and the railway station.

The Tramway was almost entirely destroyed during World War 2. The post-war Polish authorities decided to rebuild the tramway. During the late 70s, there was serious discussion and consideration of liquidating the entire tram line, following in the footsteps of nearby cities like Słupsk. However, there was massive opposition to this plan by the locals, and the plan was scrapped by the 80s. In the 1980s, the city also opened a third line.

The most recent expansion to the Tramway opened in 2006, expanding the northern termini of the line to ul. Fromborka.

== Lines ==
Tram lines 1 through 4 run on both weekdays and weekends. Tram line 5 runs exclusively on days of work (weekdays excluding holidays)

| Daily | 1, 2, 3, 4 |
| Weekdays only | 5 |

| Line | Map | Route | Number of stops | Frequency |
|---|---|---|---|---|
| 1 | | Druska – Ogólna | 21 | Weekdays 20-40; Weekends 45-60 |
| 2 | | Druska – Marymoncka | 15 | Weekdays 40; Weekends 30-45 |
| 3 | | Saperów – Ogólna | 18 | Weekdays 30; Weekends 30 |
| 4 | | Druska – Ogólna | 16 | Weekdays 20; Weekends 20 |
| 5 | | Saperów – Ogólna | 13 | Weekdays 30-35 |

== Rolling stock ==
| Type | Production | Number |
|---|---|---|
| Konstal 805Na | 1980 | 16 |
| PESA 121N | 2006 | 6 |
| Duewag M8C | 2013 | 6 |
| Moderus Beta MF 09 AC | 2020 | 5 |

Historic trams:

| Photo | Type | Production | Number |
|---|---|---|---|
| | Konstal 5N | 1959–1960 | 2 |

== Gallery ==
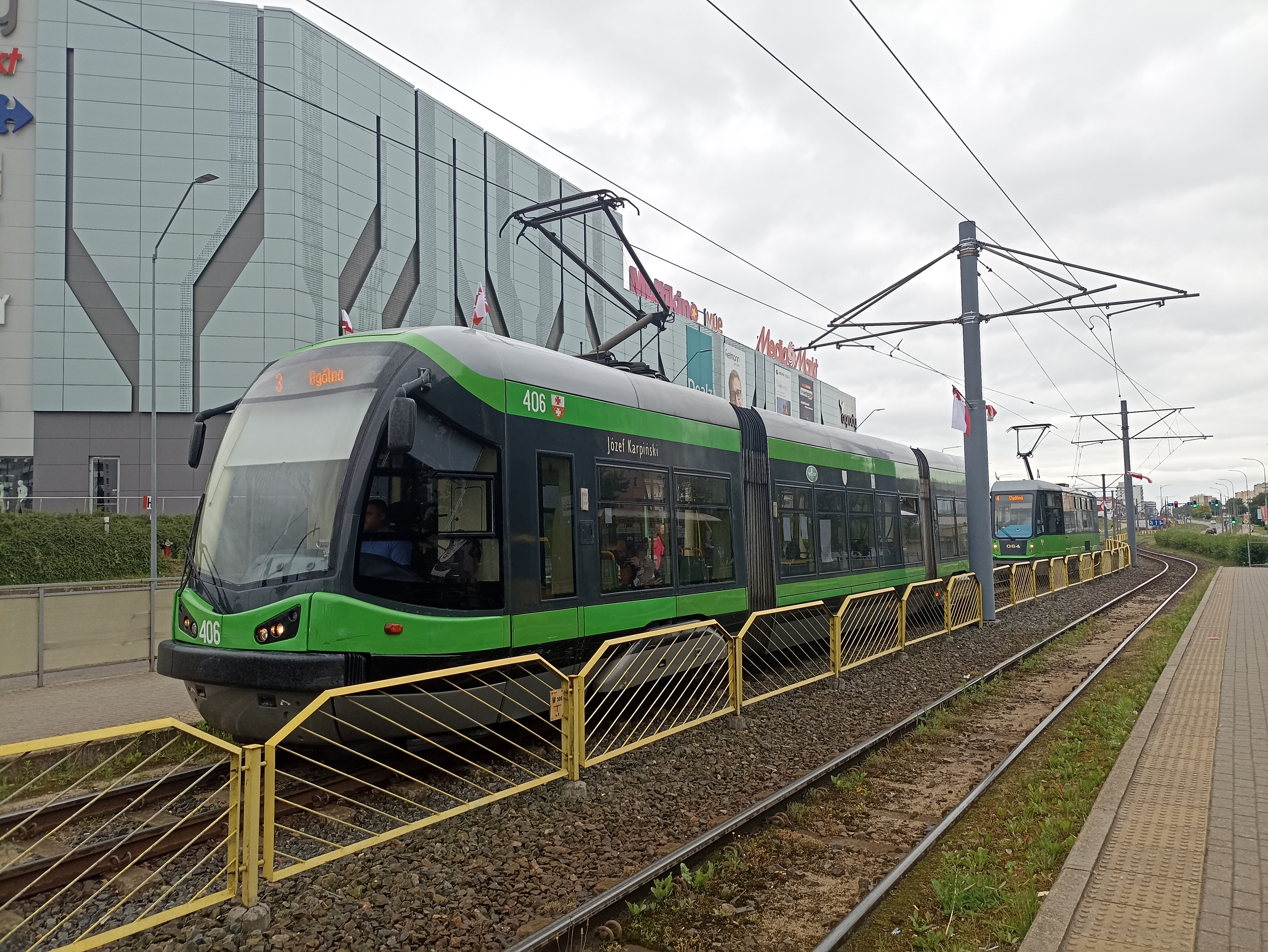
PESA 121N of Line 3 at Płk. Dąbka

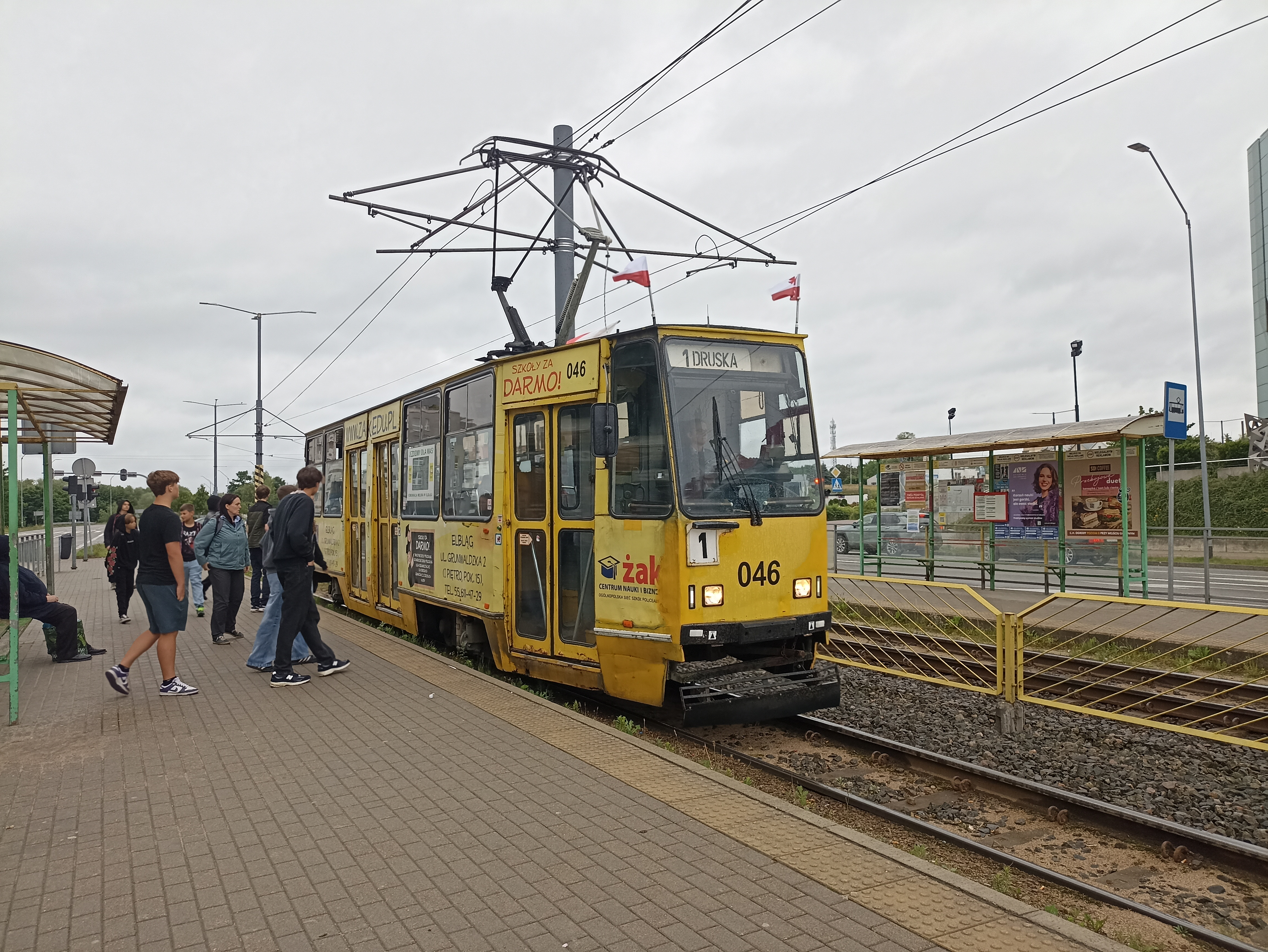
Konstal 805Na number 045

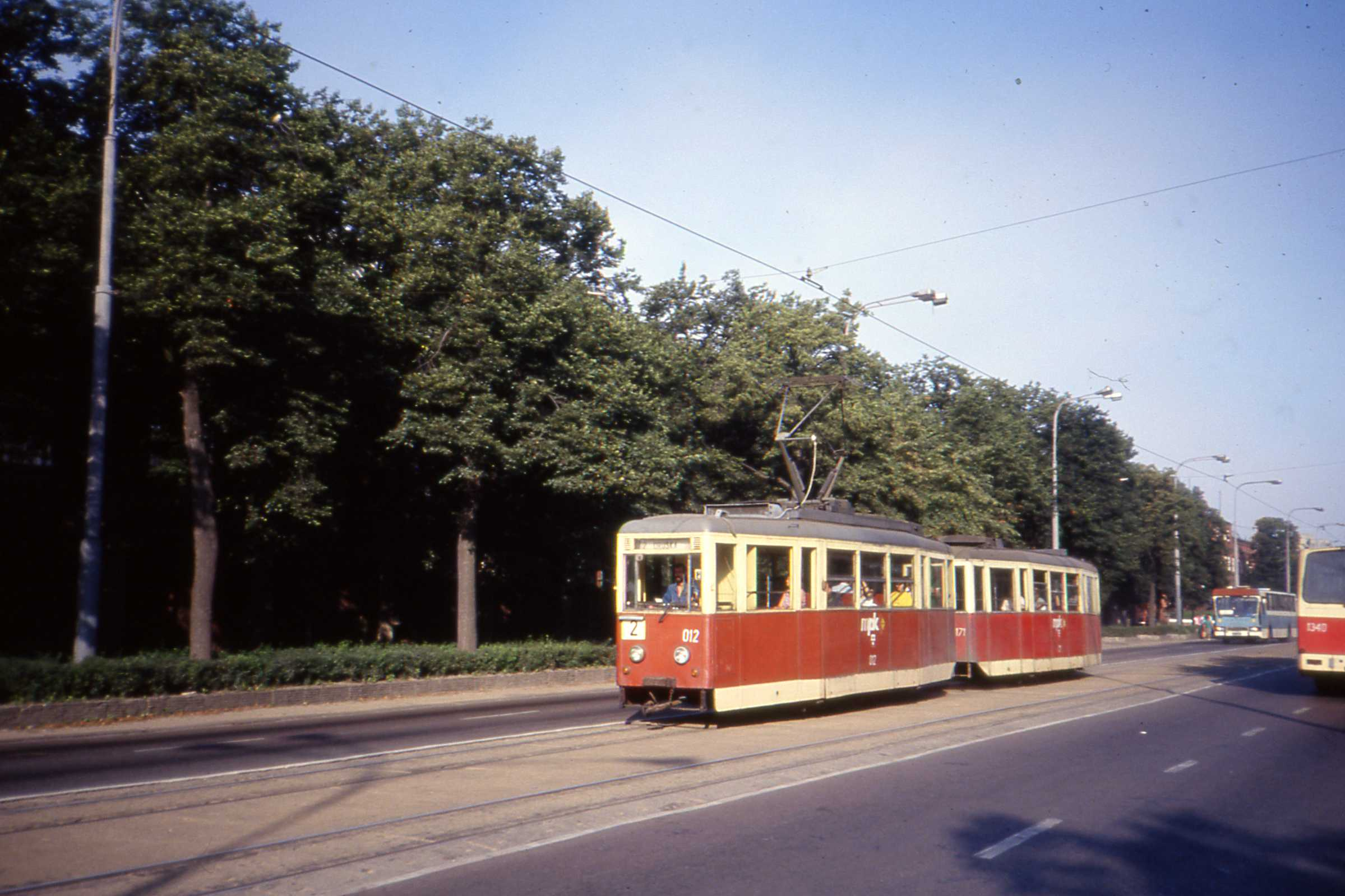
Konstal N in 1990

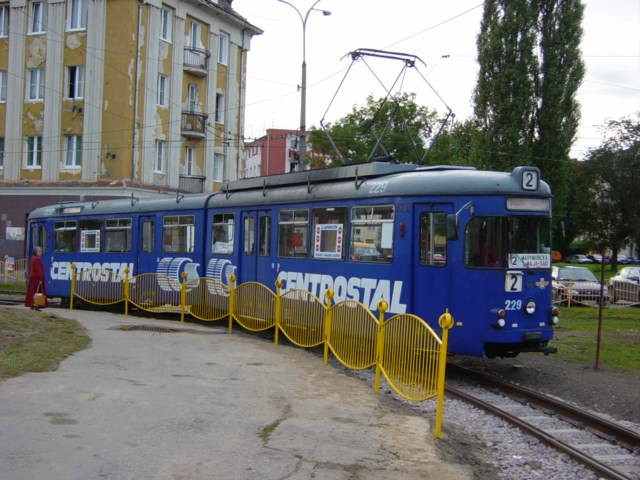
Pre-modernized Düwag GT6 tram

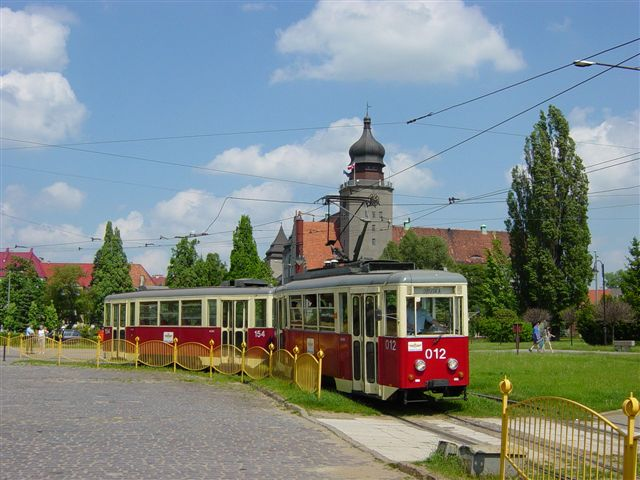
Historic Konstal 5N in service as tourist tram in 2005
