= Public transport in Szeged =

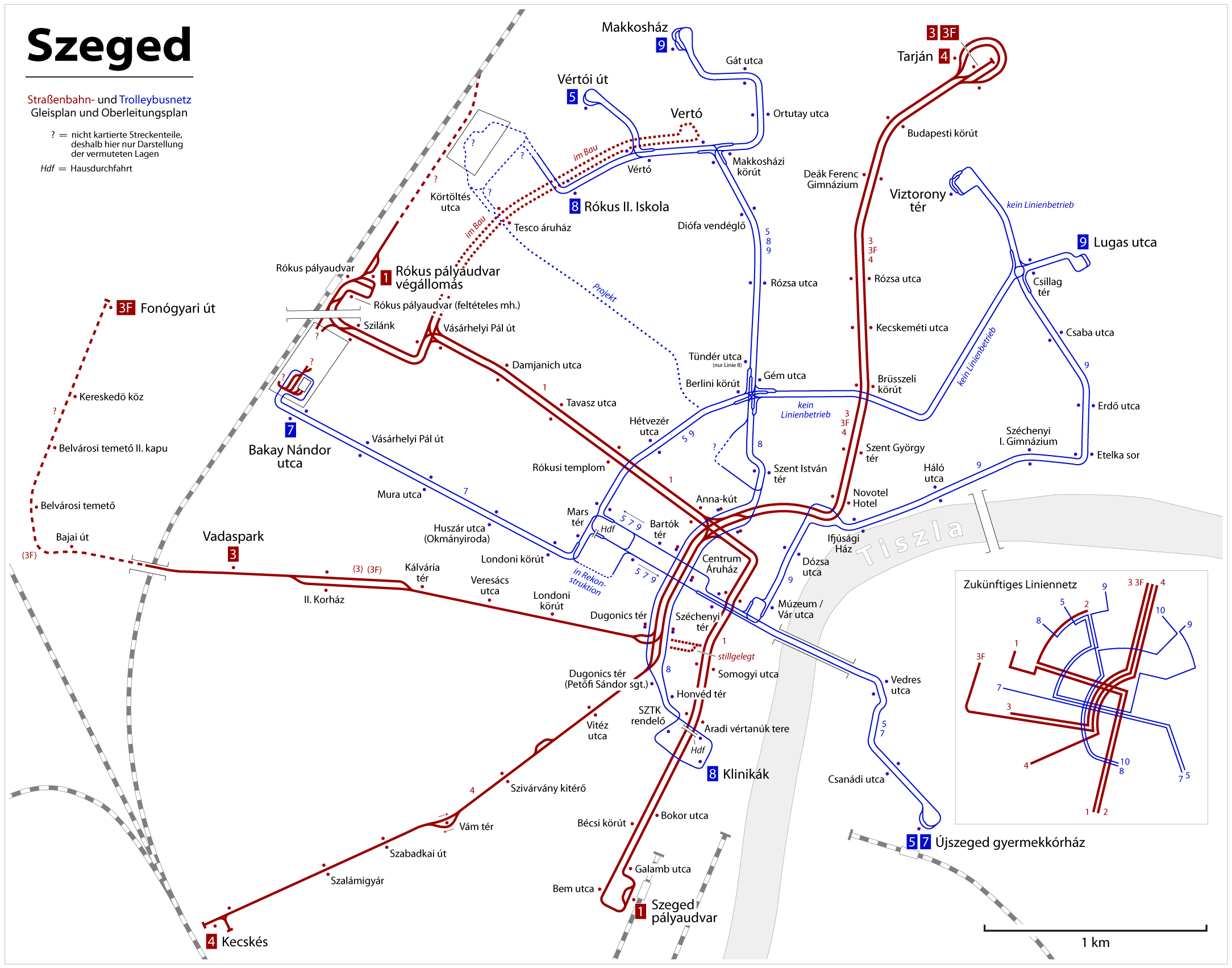
Map of the tramway and trolleybus lines. Red lines are tramway and blue ones are trolleybus lines

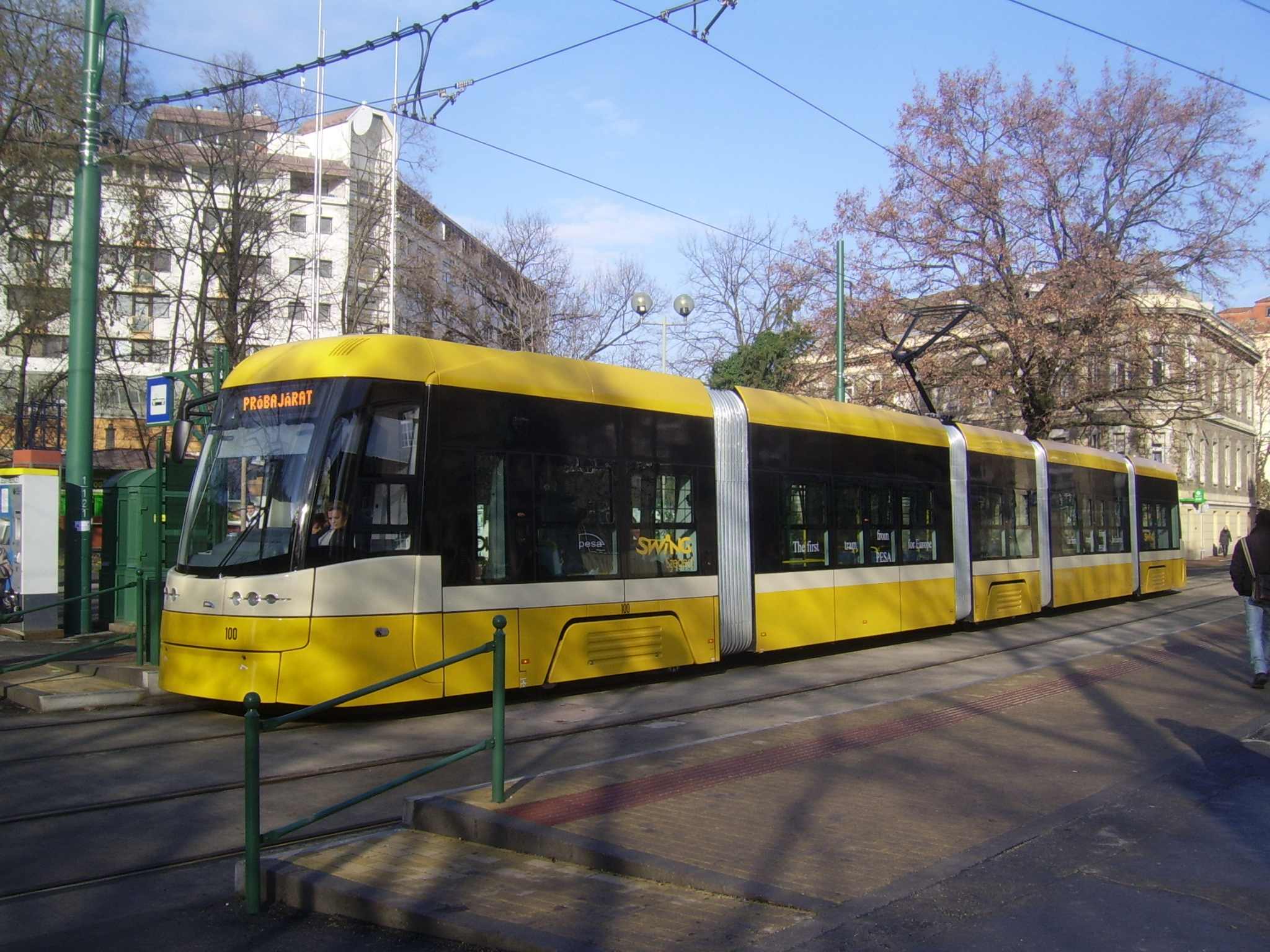
PESA 120Nb type tram in Szeged

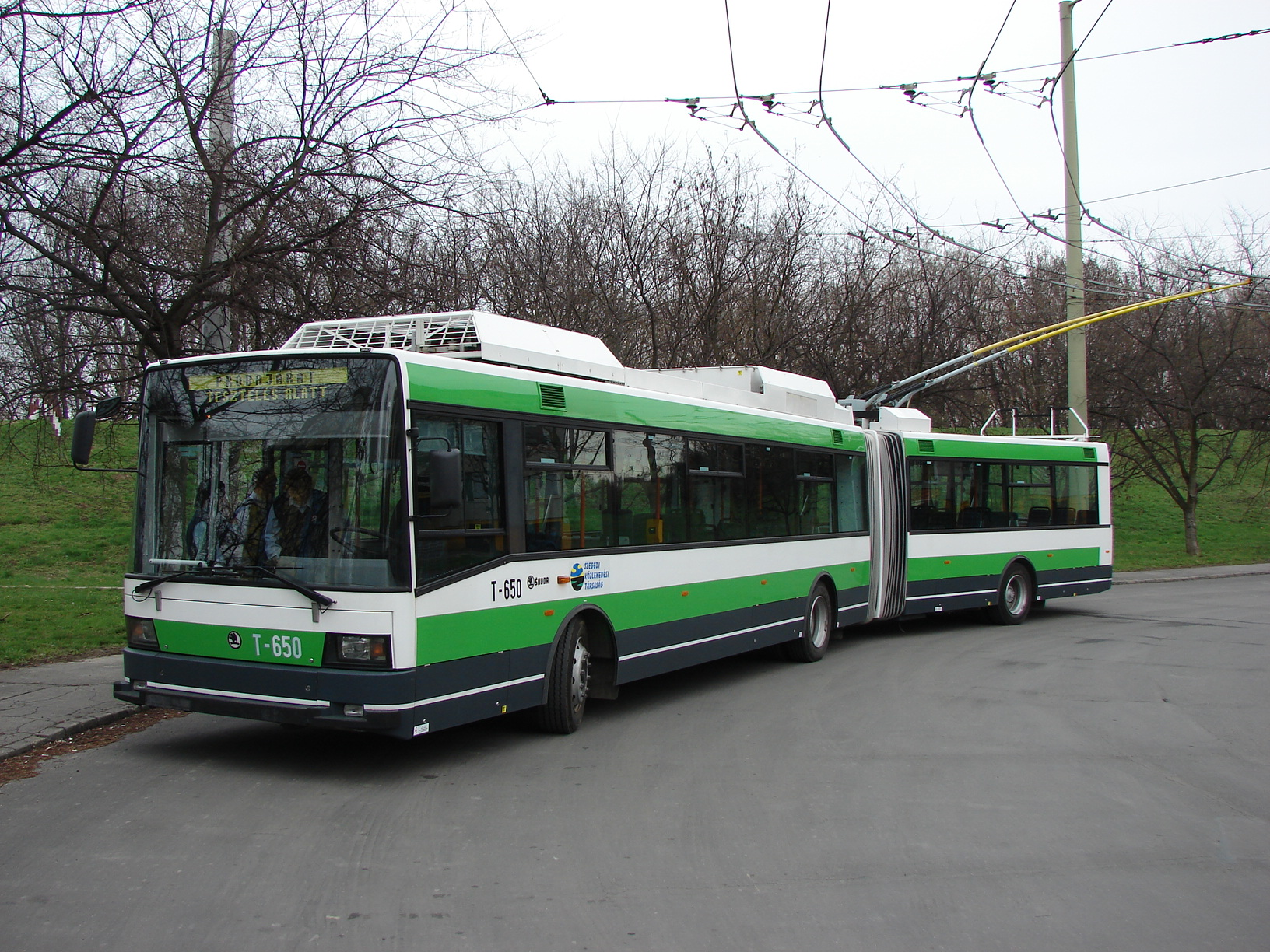
Škoda 22Tr type trolley bus in Szeged

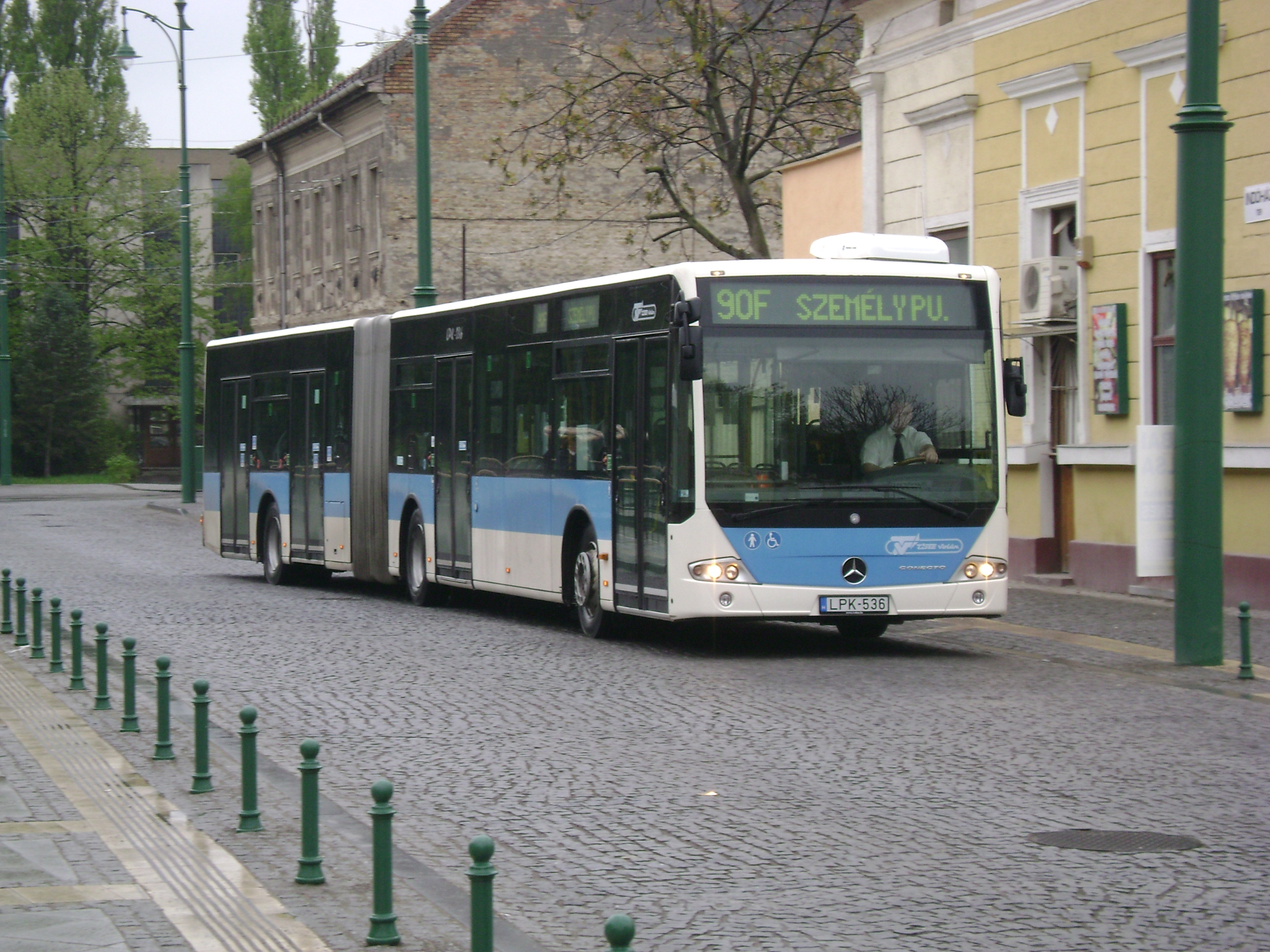
Mercedes-Benz Conecto type bus in Szeged operated by Tisza Volán on Line 90F

Public transport in Szeged, Hungary is provided by two companies, SzKT (short for the Hungarian name of Public Transport Company of Szeged) and Volánbusz. The former company operates trams and trolley buses, while the latter operates buses. SzKT is owned by the city.

After the great flood of 1879 the existing omnibus transport was insufficient for the rapidly growing city's needs, so from July 1, 1884 horse trams were operated by a company which was the predecessor of SzKT. In 1885 there were more than 300,000 passengers.

Tram traffic started on October 1, 1908. The fare was quite expensive for the time. Until 1971 trams carried not only passengers but also goods. Development was hindered by World War I: several tram lines were abolished and two tram cars were sold to other cities. Usage of the tram service decreased.

As World War II did not cause major damage in infrastructure, traffic could start again immediately after the end of the war. On April 14, 1950 the company changed its name to the Szeged Street Railway Company (Szegedi Villamos Vasút Vállalat), which was changed again in 1955 to the Szeged Transport Company (Szegedi Közlekedési Vállalat). The company started its bus service around this time. Buses were planned to play a secondary role to the tram system, but they quickly became popular. On January 1, 1963 the operation of bus service was taken over by Tisza Volán, the county's bus company.

Trolleybus services started on April 29, 1979. Trams became less popular and most of the vehicles were becoming too for old continued use; in 1996 the city bought thirteen Tatra trams. SzKT also bought new trolley buses, in 2000 and 2001. In 2005 new Tatra trams were bought to replace the old FVVs.

Szeged has 38 bus lines, four tram and six trolley bus lines. The city is one of only four Hungarian cities with trams — the others being Budapest, Miskolc and Debrecen — and, alongside Budapest and Debrecen, one of only three with trolley buses. A Tram-train line to Hódmezővásárhely was under construction as of 2019, and was finished in 2021.
