= Konstal 805Nm =

Tram by PESA in Poland

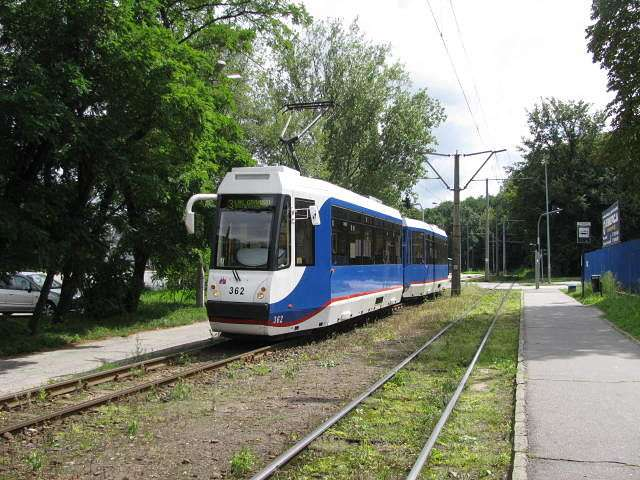
- Konstal 805Nm in Bydgoszcz
- Manufacturer: PESA
- Constructed: 2003
- Predecessor: Konstal 805Na
- Capacity: 20 (Seated); 98 (Standing)

Specifications
- Train length: 13 500 mm
- Width: 2 400 mm
- Height: 3 060 mm
- Articulated sections: 1
- Maximum speed: 70 km/h (45 mph)
- Traction system: Thyristor chopper, Later Resistor control
- Bogies: fixed
- Track gauge: 1,000 mm (3 ft 3 3/8 in)

Konstal 805NM is the name of a tram, that was modernized in 2003 by the company PESA for MZK Bydgoszcz which operates trams in Bydgoszcz. Only one set of 805Na wagons was modernized. Changes regarding 805Na were both in the exterior and the equipment of the vehicle.
