= Pesa 401M =

2009 Polish passenger railroad car

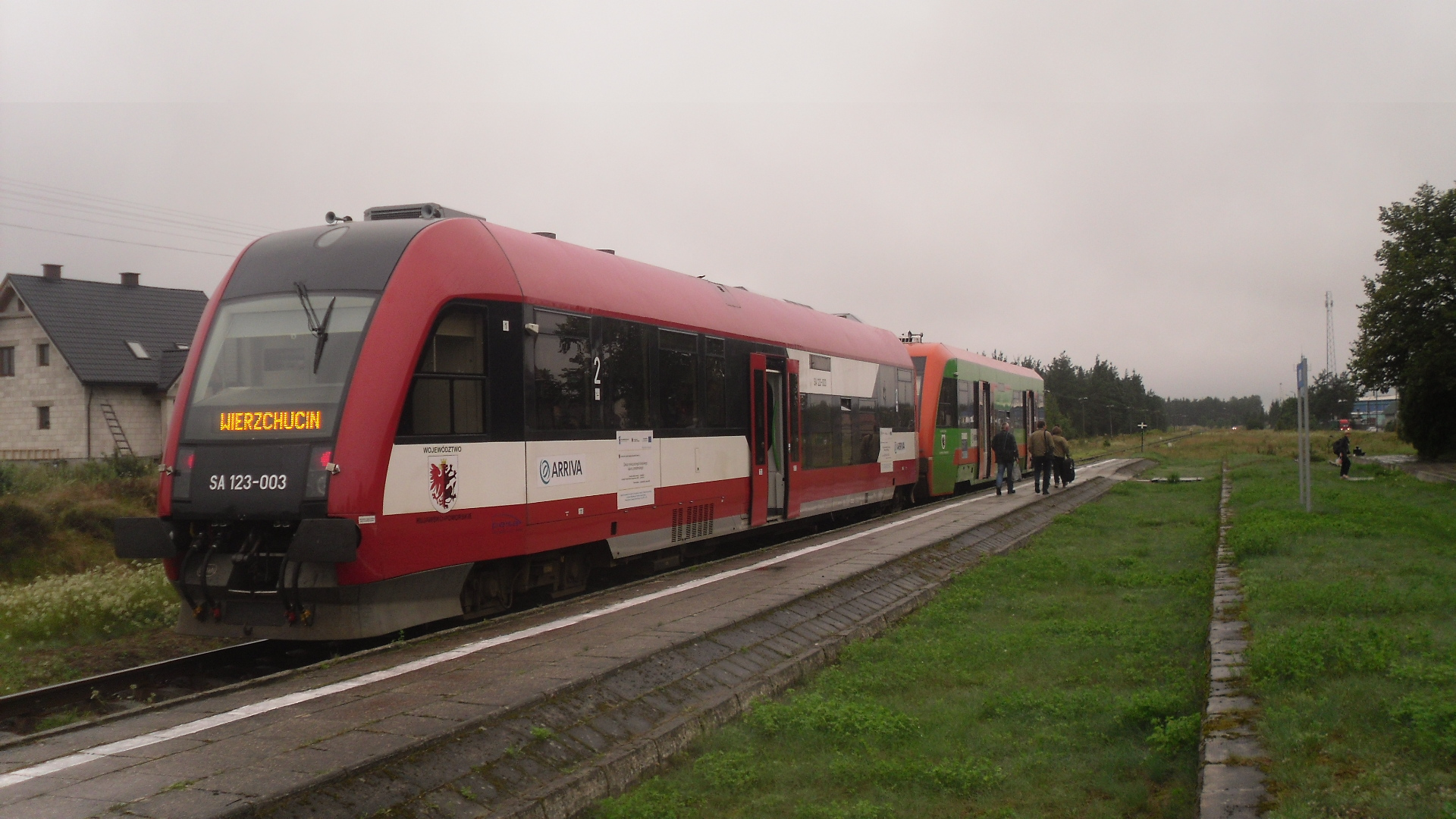
- SA123-003
- Stock type: control car
- Manufacturer: Pesa Bydgoszcz
- Constructed: 2009
- Capacity: 170 (78 seats)

Specifications
- Train length: 24,500 millimetres (80.4 ft)
- Width: 2,890 millimetres (9.48 ft)
- Height: 4,135 millimetres (13.566 ft)
- Low-floor: 50%
- Wheel diameter: 840 millimetres (2.76 ft)
- Maximum speed: 120 kilometres per hour (75 mph)
- Weight: 43,500 kilograms (95,900 lb)

Pesa 401M (SA123 series) is a control car used as a trailer for Pesa 214M railbuses of the SA106 series. This wagon was built by Pesa for the Marshal's Office of the Kuyavian–Pomeranian Voivodeship, with a total of 5 units produced.

== Origins ==
In the Kuyavian–Pomeranian Voivodeship, particularly in its western part, there are many non-electrified railway lines. Since 2007, they have been serviced by Arriva RP. On these lines, the Pesa 214M railcars of the SA106 series are predominantly used, but these often proved too small when operating alone. To address this issue, two units of the 214M type were coupled together or one was paired with a regular passenger car. The first method increased the demand for diesel railcars, while the second increased the number of maneuvers at stations, as the driver's cab had to be at the front of the train. For this reason, it was decided to purchase control cars with a cab at the end.

== Construction ==
The SA123 series control cars are produced by Pesa in Bydgoszcz. During construction, many solutions used in other railcars were utilized. These vehicles, along with the SA121 and SA122 series, are among the three types of control cars in diesel traction in Poland and the only ones not found in a permanent trainset.

=== Body ===
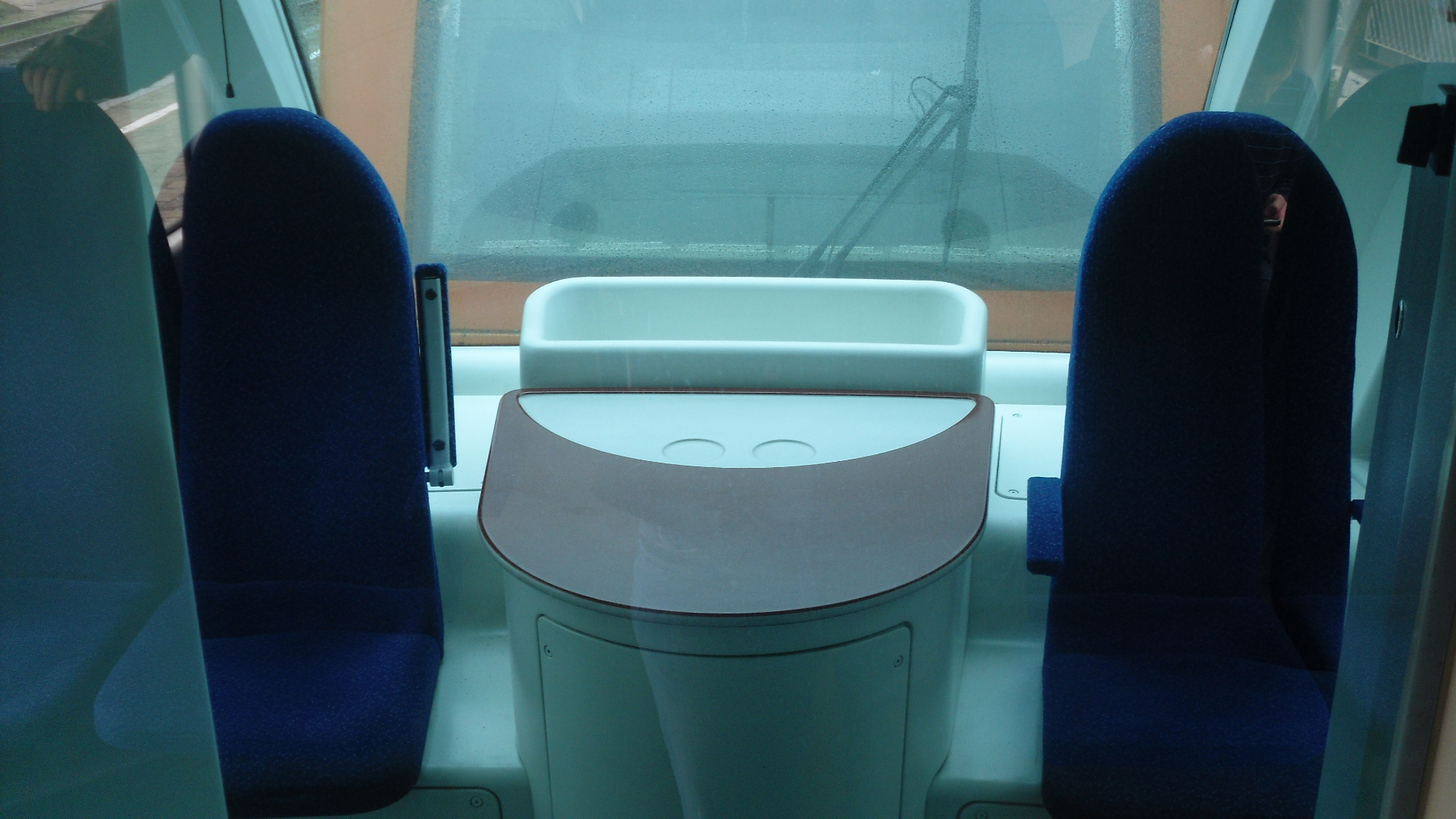
Staff compartment

The body of the car is almost identical to the body of the 214Mb type vehicle. Unlike the vehicles from the 214M family, the car has only one pair of doors on each side (this configuration also appeared in 2012 in the version for Masovian Railways designated as the SA135 series).

=== Interior ===
The car is approximately 50% low-floor. The low floor is 600 mm above the rail head, while the high floor is at 1,290 mm. The vehicle has one toilet not adapted for disabled people, 70 fixed seats, and 8 foldable seats in the low-floor area. The passenger space is monitored and air-conditioned.

The car has one air-conditioned driver's cab, identical to the driver's cab of the SA106 series car, and at the opposite end, there is a staff compartment for the conductors' team, equipped with two seats facing the center of the car and a table between them.

=== Generator ===
Under part of the floor, there is a Lechomotoren generator (with a power of 56kW) powered by a Perkins diesel engine. The generator powers all electrical circuits independently of the connected motor car.

=== Bogies ===
The car uses JBg 3965 bogies, allowing for a speed of 120 km/h (the same as in the 214M type vehicles). For the first stage of suspension, metal-rubber elements were used, and for the second, pneumatic cushions. Additionally, the bogies are equipped with a disc brake, sandboxes, and devices for lubricating the flanges of the outer wheelsets.

== Operation ==
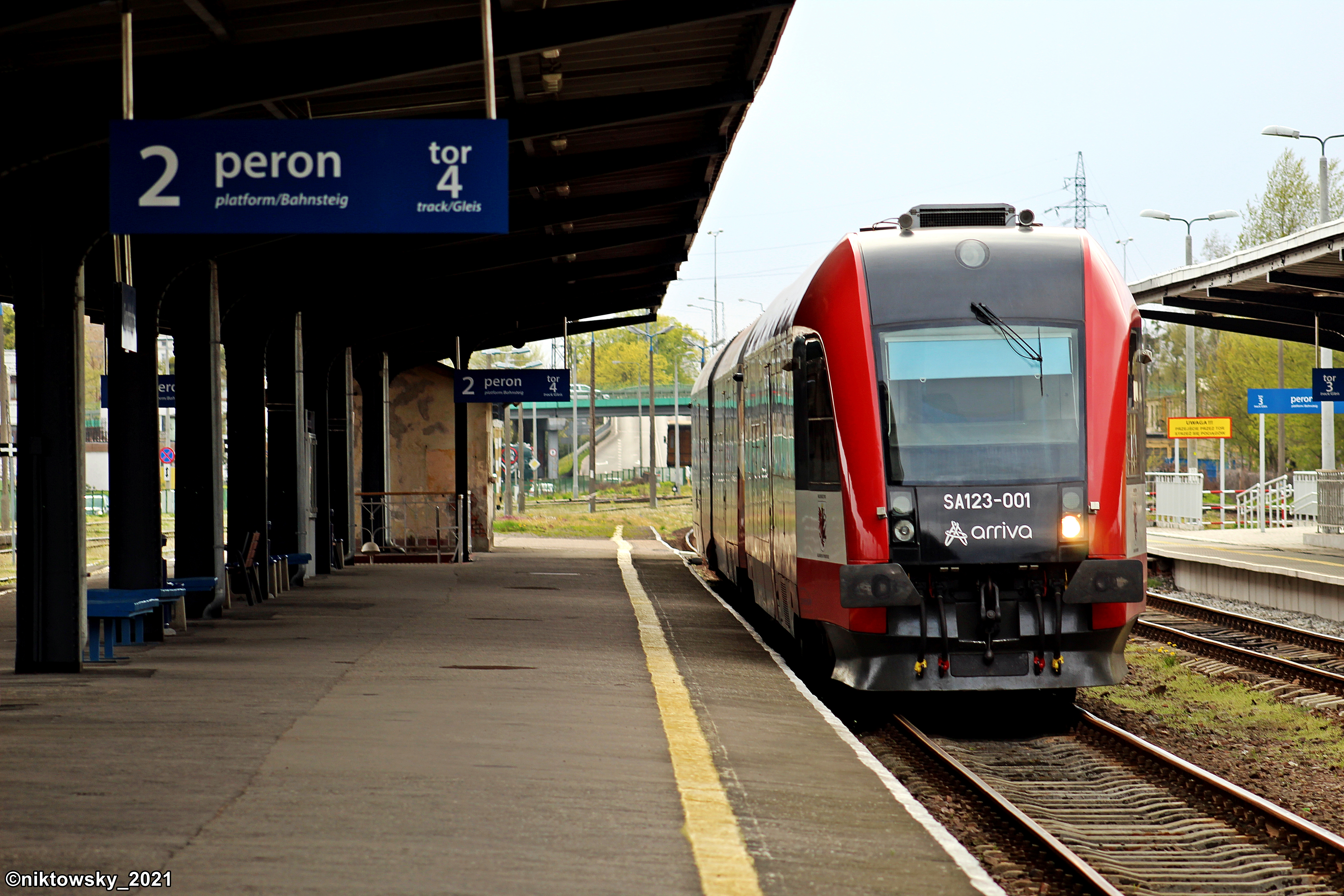
SA123-001 Arriva RP

In early 2009, the Marshal's Office in Toruń ordered a control car from Pesa that could work with the 214M railcars it owned. Five cars cost a total of 23.7 million PLN. They were purchased with funds from the Regional Operational Program of the Kuyavian–Pomeranian Voivodeship. All five cars were received by the Marshal's Office on 29 and 30 July 2009. The handover ceremony took place on August 3 in Chełmża. The first vehicle (SA123-001) was handed over to PKP PR for the Bydgoszcz Główna–Chełmża route, and the remaining 4 to Arriva PCC Rail for regional connections in the voivodeship.

=== PKP Polregio ===
The SA123-001 car was handed over to the then PKP Polregio company, but the low traffic on the Bydgoszcz to Chełmża line meant that, apart from the inaugural ride, this vehicle did not go on route and remained in the Toruń depot. Later, this vehicle was transferred to Arriva.

=== Arriva PCC ===
Initially, 4 cars were handed over to Arriva PCC, of which 2 were directed to serve the Toruń–Grudziądz and Bydgoszcz–Tuchola routes as an attachment to the SA106, while the other 2 were kept in reserve. Later, the fifth SA123 was also transferred to the company.
