= Pesa 214M =

Family of standard-gauge diesel railcars produced by Pesa

SA103, SA106, SA135
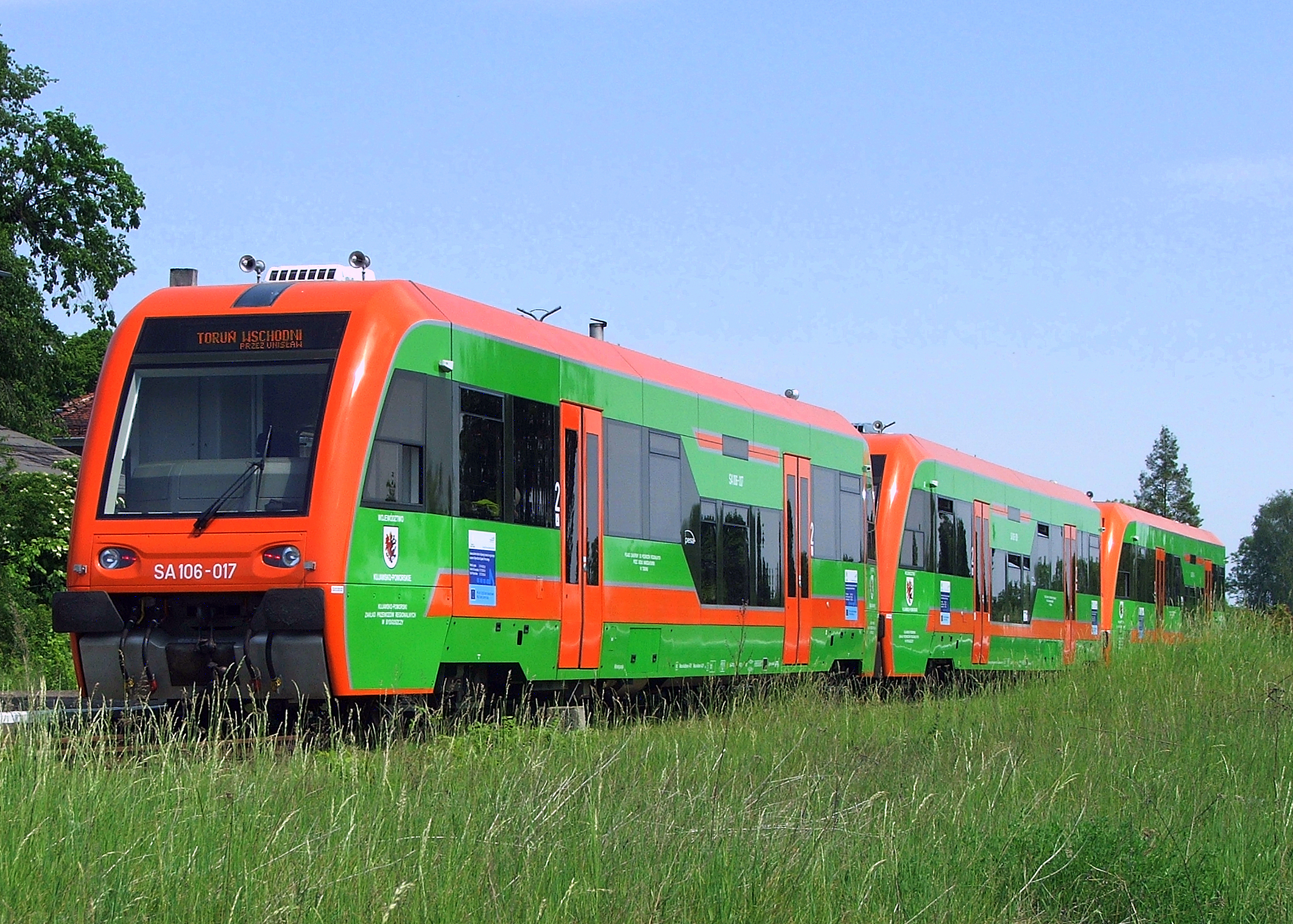
- Three SA106 at Unisław Pomorski railway station
- Stock type: diesel multiple unit
- Manufacturers: Pesa Bydgoszcz; Mińsk Mazowiecki Railway Repair Plant
- Assembly: Poland
- Constructed: 2001–2016
- Number built: 56
- Capacity: about 60 seating places

Specifications
- Train length: 24,500 mm (80.4 ft)
- Width: 2,890 mm (9.48 ft)
- Height: 4,135 mm (13.566 ft) or 4,085 mm (13.402 ft)
- Platform height: 570 mm (1.87 ft)
- Wheel diameter: 840 mm (2.76 ft)
- Maximum speed: 120 km/h (75 mph)
- Engine type: diesel engine

The Pesa 214M is a family of standard-gauge diesel railcars produced by Pesa Bydgoszcz between 2001 and 2016, intended for regional transport on non-electrified lines. The family includes: 214M (SA106), 214Ma (SA103), and 214Mb (SA135). A total of 56 units were produced, which are operated by Arriva (13 units), Lower Silesian Railways (10 units), Masovian Railways (7 units), and Polregio (26 units).

== History ==
=== State of Polish railways after 1990 ===
By the mid-90s, Polish State Railways owned 6 railbuses produced by Kolzam in Racibórz (SN81 and SA104) and 6 by Poznań Railway Repair Plant (SA101 and SA102).

In the 90s, Polish State Railways planned several purchases of rolling stock: 16 Pendolino trainsets, 50 electric locomotives, and several hundred railbuses for local connections. None of these purchases were realized. In light of these plans, Kolzam and Poznań Railway Repair Plant, the only railbus manufacturers in Poland at that time, made some preparations. Kolzam, for instance, developed the design of a three-section railbus based on the SA104, which never went into service.

The enactment of the 2000 Polish State Railways Restructuring Act changed the financing of regional transport, creating Polregio and obliging local governments to allocate part of their funds for rolling stock purchases.

=== Origins ===
Given the rolling stock situation of the Polish railways, the transforming Rail Rolling Stock Repair Workshop in Bydgoszcz aimed to develop new rail vehicles and decided to produce a diesel railcar using their own funds.

In 2000, Rail Rolling Stock Repair Workshop in Bydgoszcz proposed developing a comprehensive new vehicle project to an informal design group D7, which had previously designed several equipment components for the Rail Rolling Stock Repair Workshop. The designers accepted the proposal and began the actual work in January 2001. The main designers were Marek Adamczewski, Bogumiła Jóźwicka, Jarosław Szymański, and Marek Średniawa, collaborating with Magdalena Berlińska, Rafał Dętkoś, Paweł Gełesz, Adam Szczepocki, Michał Mirski, Tomasz Kwiatkowski, and Piotr Mikołajczak. Construction of the railcar also began in January, with the prototype scheduled to be showcased 9 months later at the Trako fair, leading to simultaneous design and production efforts. Initially, the external form was developed based on competitive solutions, potential user requirements, and production capabilities. Subsequently, the interior layout was designed, and a full-scale cab mock-up was built for ergonomic studies, involving Studio 1:1.

The prototype diesel railcar, offered under the trade name Partner, was presented as planned in mid-October 2001 at the Trako fair in Oliwa by Pesa Bydgoszcz. Following the event, promotional shows were organized in various Polish cities to attract local governments' interest in the new regional rail solution. From 10 to 12 May 2002, test runs were conducted by the Railway Scientific and Technical Centre.

=== Related vehicles ===
- The 214M design was based on the compartmentless 120A railroad car. Many parts from an existing 120A vehicle were used in building the first 214M unit (SA106-001).
- The 214M railcar was a direct precursor to the production of the two-section 218M vehicles and the broad-gauge 610M and 620M railcars.
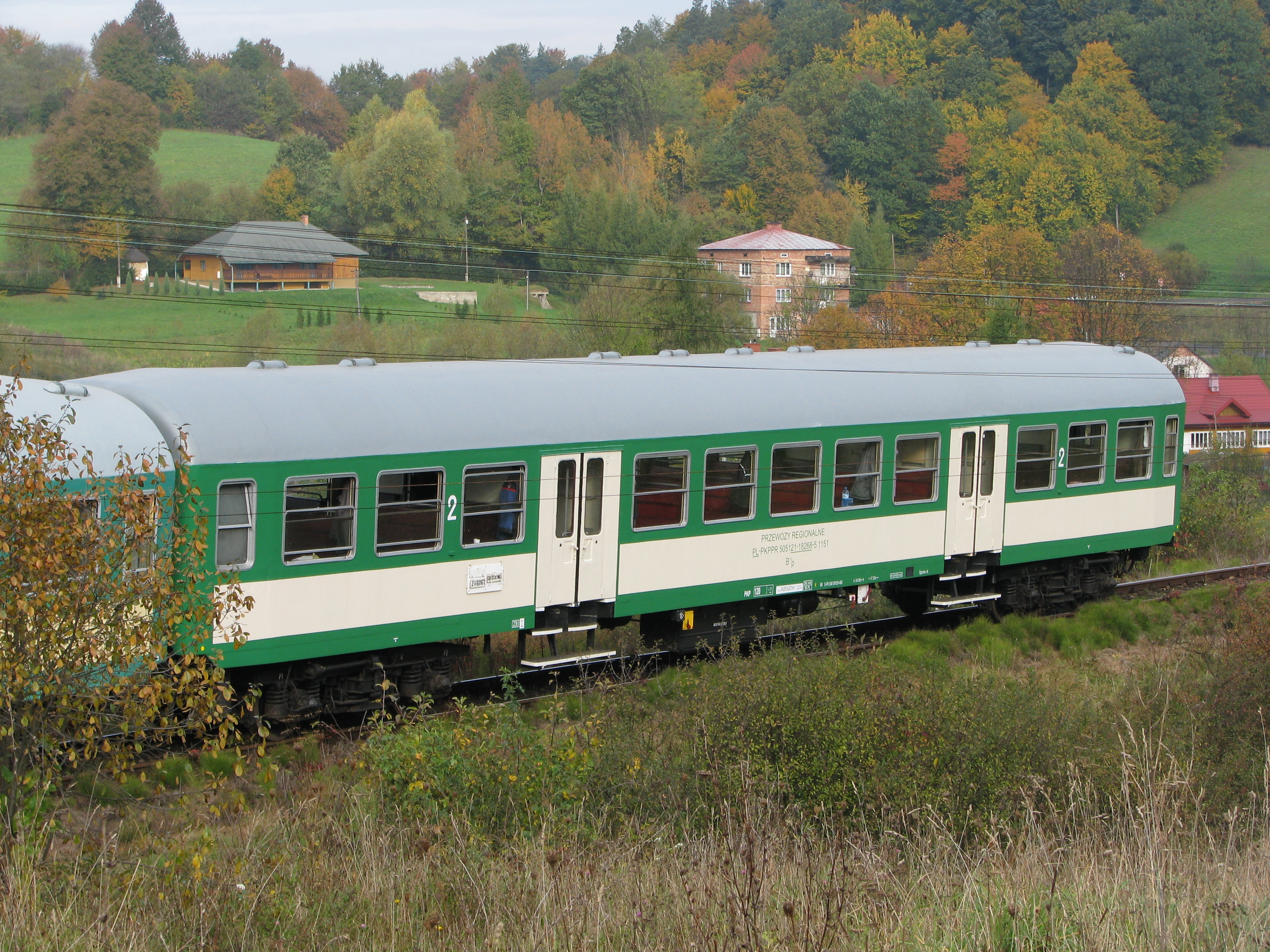
120A

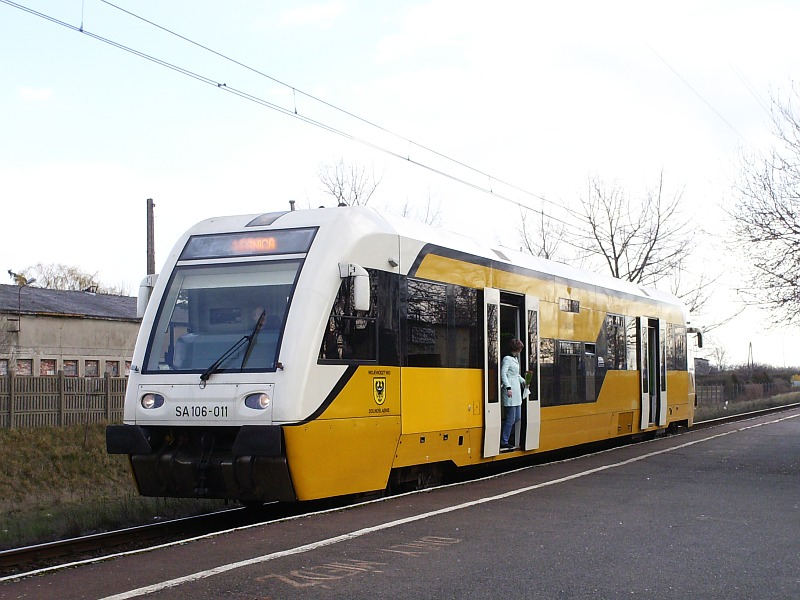
214M

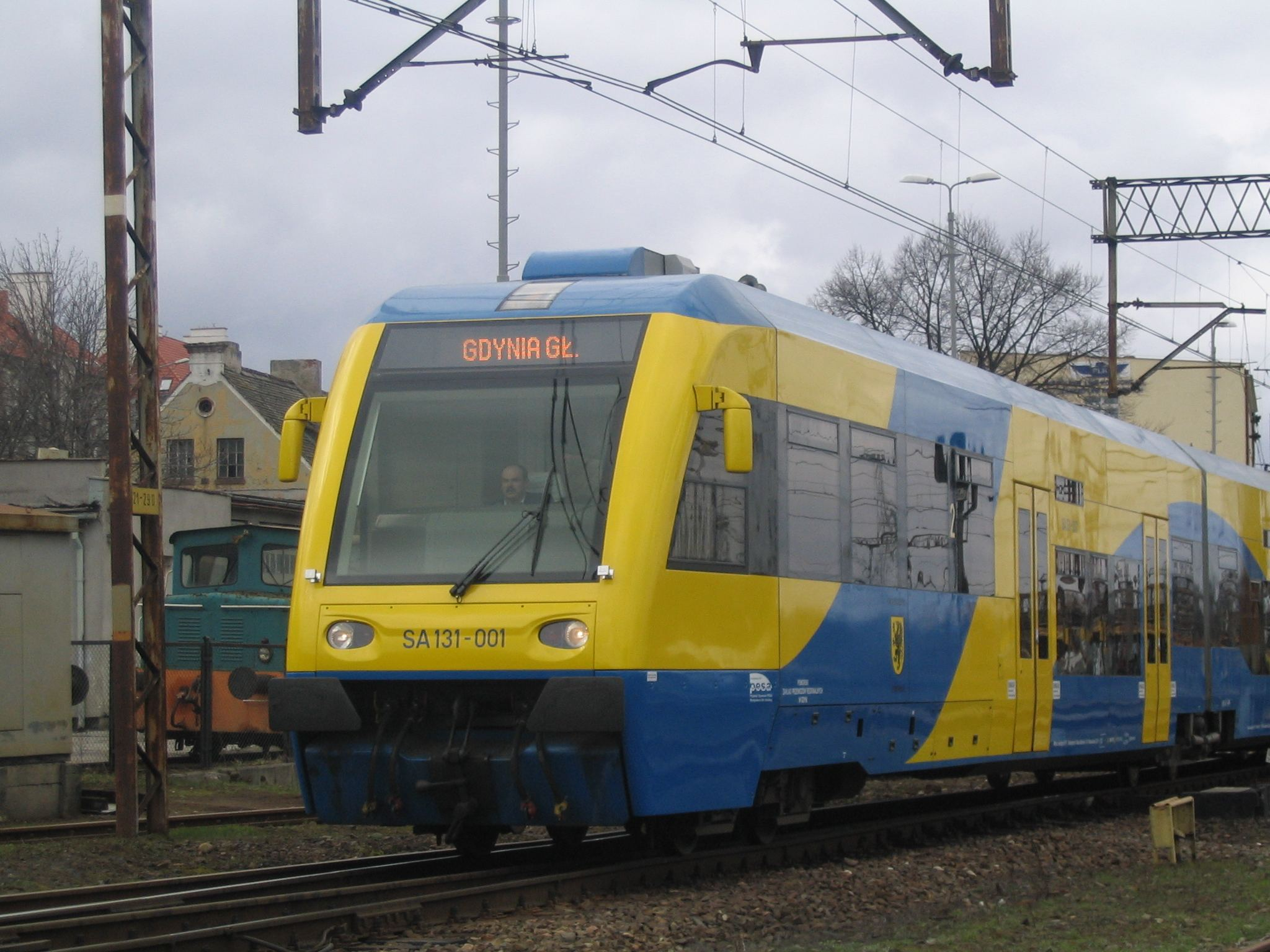
218M

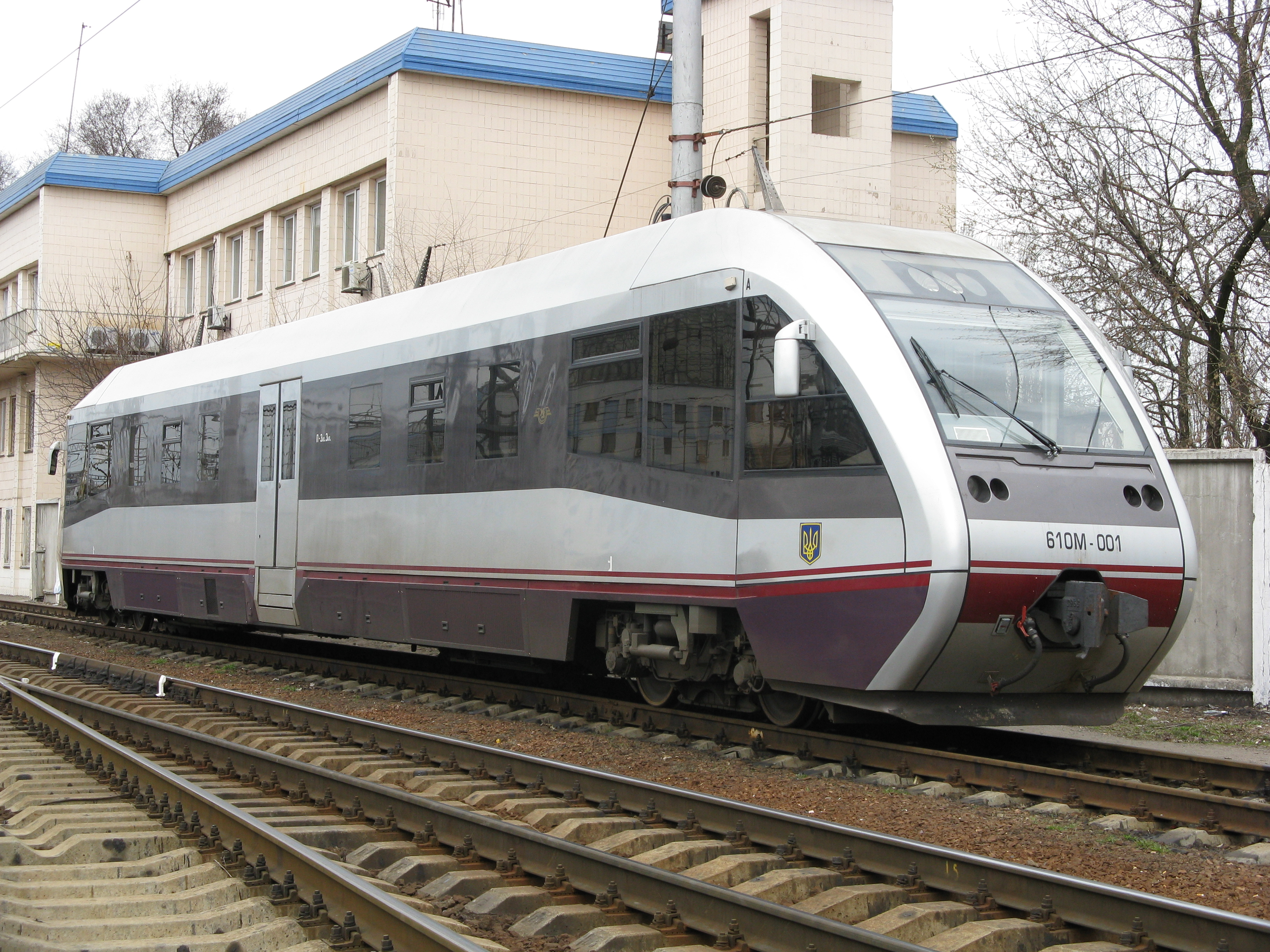
610M

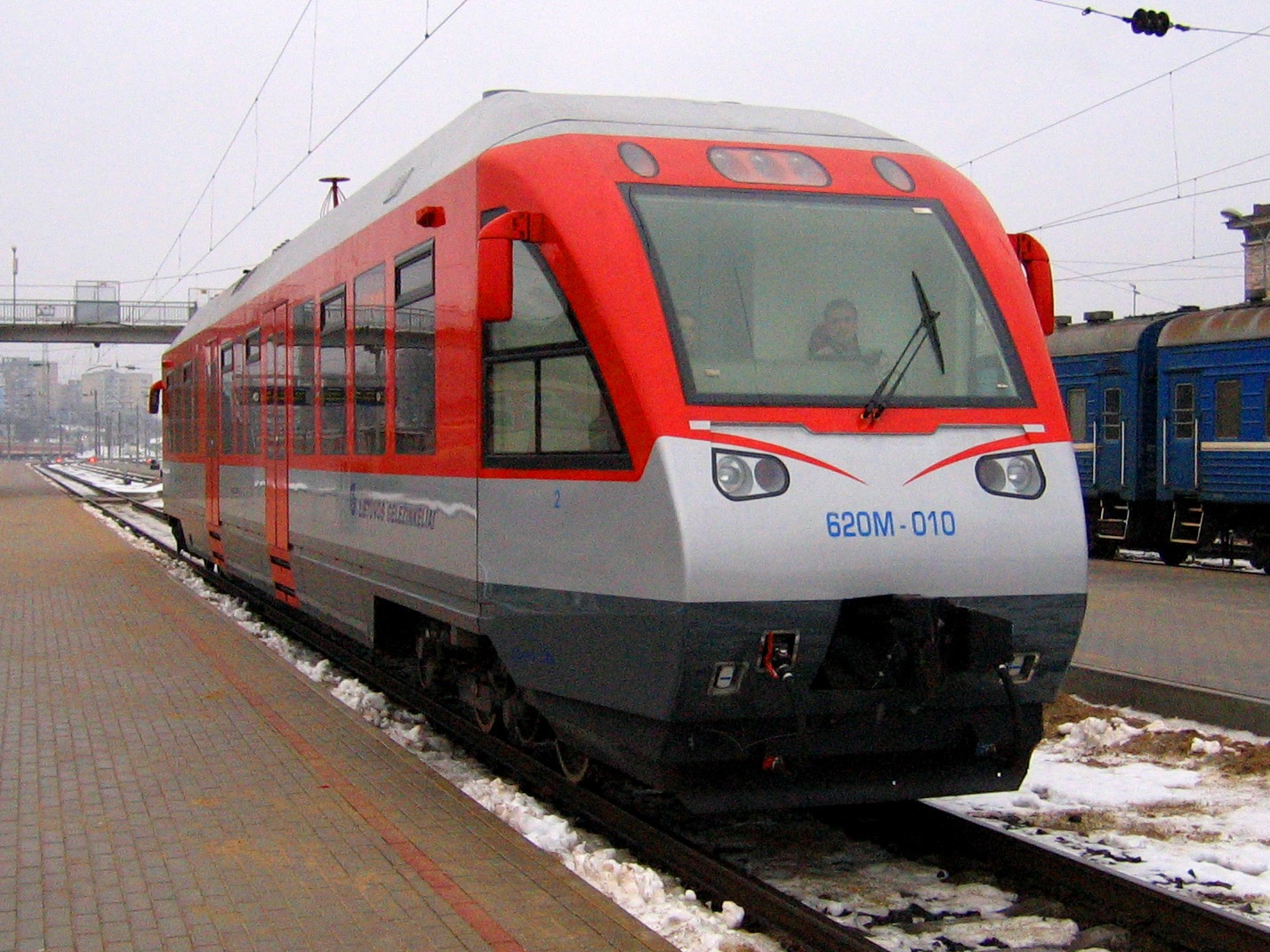
620M

=== Series SA106, SA103, and SA135 ===
The vehicles from the 214M family were classified as railbuses when assigning Polish State Railways series, despite similar vehicles previously being classified as diesel railcars.

The base type 214M vehicles were assigned the series SA106, even though there were no vehicles classified under the SA103 series at that time. In subsequent years, the series numbers from SA107 to SA110 were used up, exhausting the allocation for railbuses within the diesel railcar designation system. When the 214Ma subtype was produced, it was decided to assign it the previously unused SA103 series. Later Pesa diesel vehicles (from the Pesa 218M family) received numbers from SA131 to SA134, starting from the lowest number not designated by the standard. The 214Mb subtype was designated as SA135.

== Construction ==
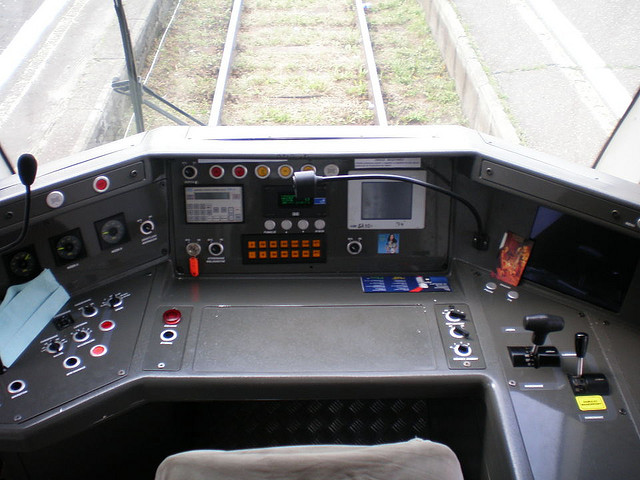
Driver's cab in SA103-006

The 214M family of diesel railcars are single-space vehicles powered by diesel engines. Some design solutions from the 120A railroad car were used in their construction. The railcar's dimensions are 24.5 m in length, 2.89 m in width, and 4.135 m or 4.084 m (Masovian Railways version) in height. The service weight of the railcars ranges from 52 to 62 t. The first produced railcar, weighing 52 t, was the lightest and matched the initial design specifications for the 214Mx vehicles.

=== Drive system ===
The 214M family vehicles have one diesel engine connected to a hydrodynamic transmission. The drive unit is linked by a drive shaft to an intermediate axle gearbox on the first wheelset of the powered bogie. Through another shaft, power is transmitted from the intermediate axle gearbox to the final axle gearbox on the second wheelset of the powered bogie.

Multiple traction is possible for up to 3 vehicles, including those from the 218M family. The 214Mx models were equipped with engines producing from 350 to 390 kW or 500 kW. The SA106 series, due to its powerful 500 kW engine, can pull an additional wagon, such as the Pesa 401M (SA123) designed for this purpose, but it cannot provide interior heating for the additional wagon. Vehicles with less powerful engines are more economical but struggle on steep gradients. The manufacturer claims the vehicle is comfortable to operate, featuring an ergonomic driver’s cab and cruise control. The 214M is equipped with a vehicle control and diagnostics system.

The first 214Mx (SA106-001) was fitted with a MAN engine, subsequent SA106 units received Iveco engines, and SA103 and SA135 units were equipped with MTU engines. The SA106 vehicles have a hydraulic transmission from Voith, while the SA103 and SA135 models use a hydromechanical transmission from ZF.

=== Bogies and suspension ===
Each 214Mx runs on two two-axle bogies: a powered bogie (JBg 3964) and a trailer bogie (JBg 3965). The distance between the pivot pins is 17.2 m.

The vehicle suspension system has two stages of springing. The first stage includes metal-rubber elements, and the second stage consists of pneumatic springs that connect the body to the bogies.

=== Car body ===
The 214Mx vehicles were produced with 4 different body stylizations. The first 10 units have the original design. From unit number 011 onwards in the 214Ma (SA103) and later in the 214M (SA106), changes were introduced, including a new front design. Another design change occurred with the introduction of the 214Mb (SA135). Vehicles marked by Mińsk Mazowiecki Railway Repair Plant (SA135-004 to 014) have yet another external appearance. The vehicle frames of the 214M family are made of welded steel, with aluminum cladding bonded to the structure. The structural strength complies with the PN-EN 12663 (Category PIII) standard. The vehicles feature plug-sliding doors.

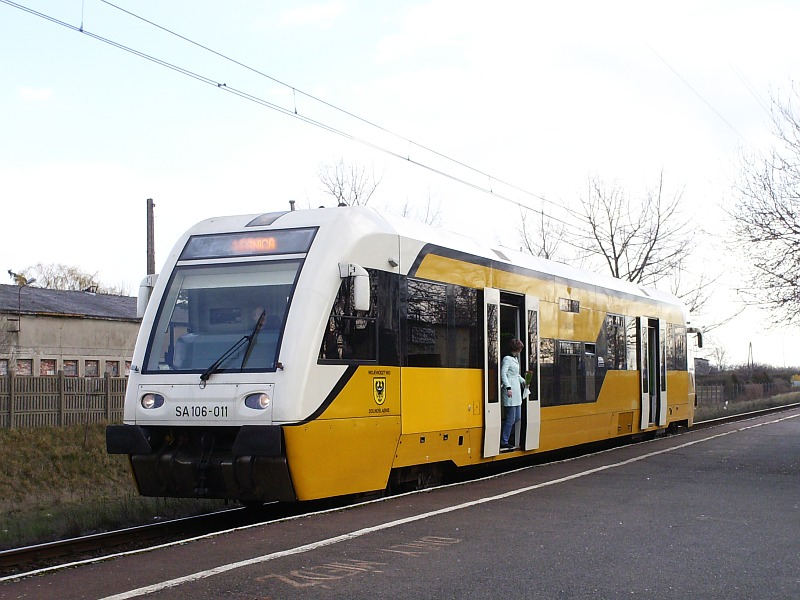
214M (SA106-011)

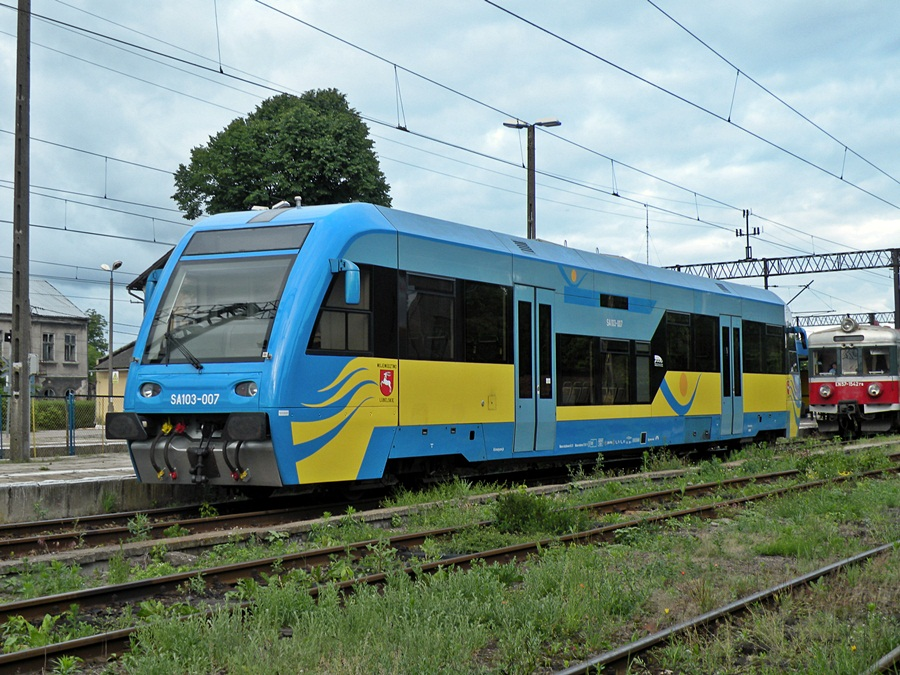
214Ma (SA103-007)

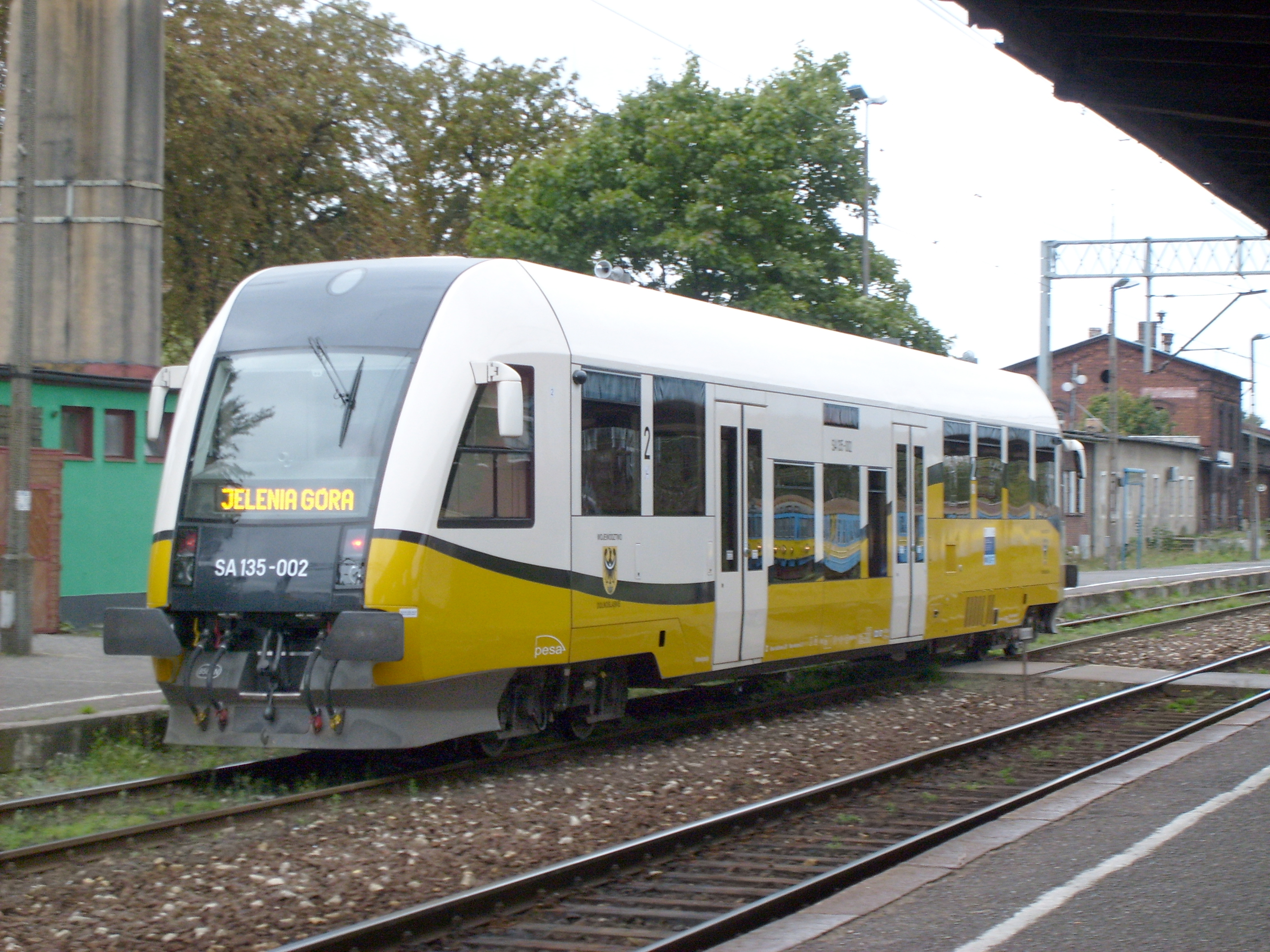
214Mb (SA135-002)

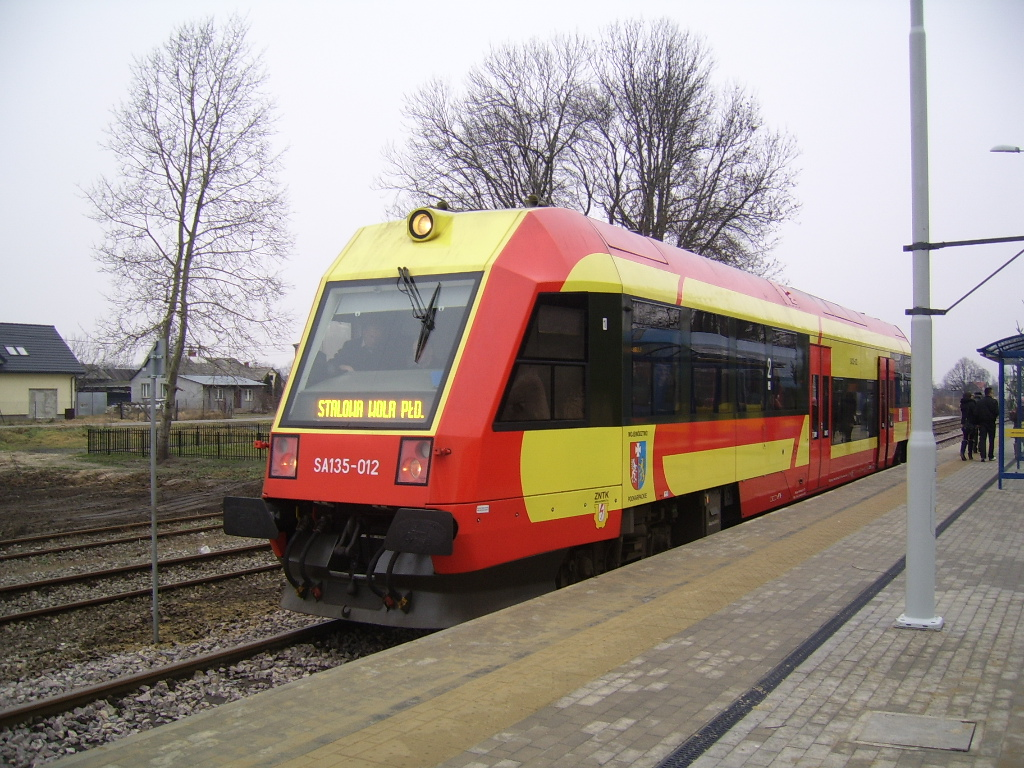
214Mb Mińsk (SA135-012)

=== Passenger space ===
The train is designed to accommodate disabled passengers, featuring approximately 50% low-floor area, a boarding ramp, and a specially adapted closed-system toilet. The floor height is 600 mm above the railhead in the low-floor section and 1,290 mm in the high-floor section. The vehicles have either one or two pairs of double-leaf doors with a clearance of 1,300 mm. Heating is provided by the engine's cooling system, a Webasto Thermo 350 heater, and additional electric blowers installed in the door vestibules. The interior arrangement, seating capacity (typically around 60 seats), monitoring, and air conditioning are tailored to the customer's requirements. The materials used differ between versions branded by Pesa and those by Mińsk Mazowiecki Railway Repair Plant. The vehicles are also equipped with interior monitoring and some have factory-installed Wi-Fi.

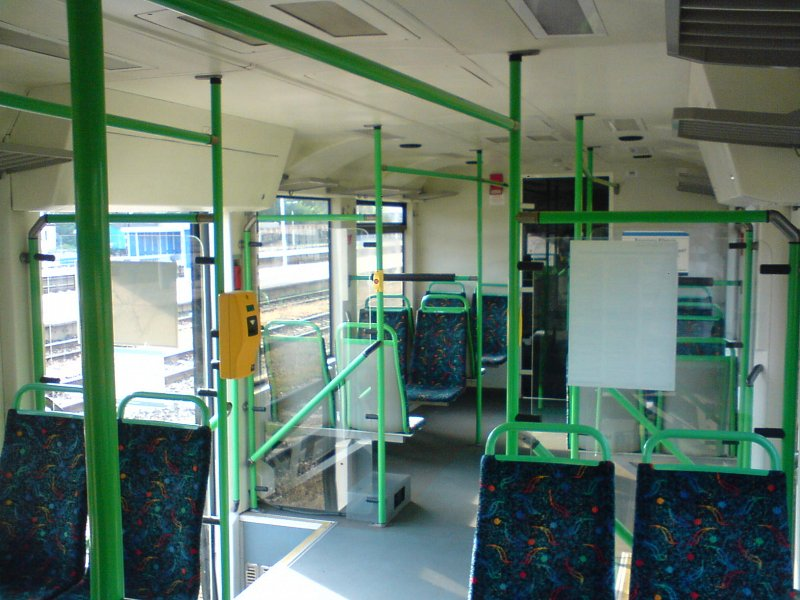
214M (SA106-003)

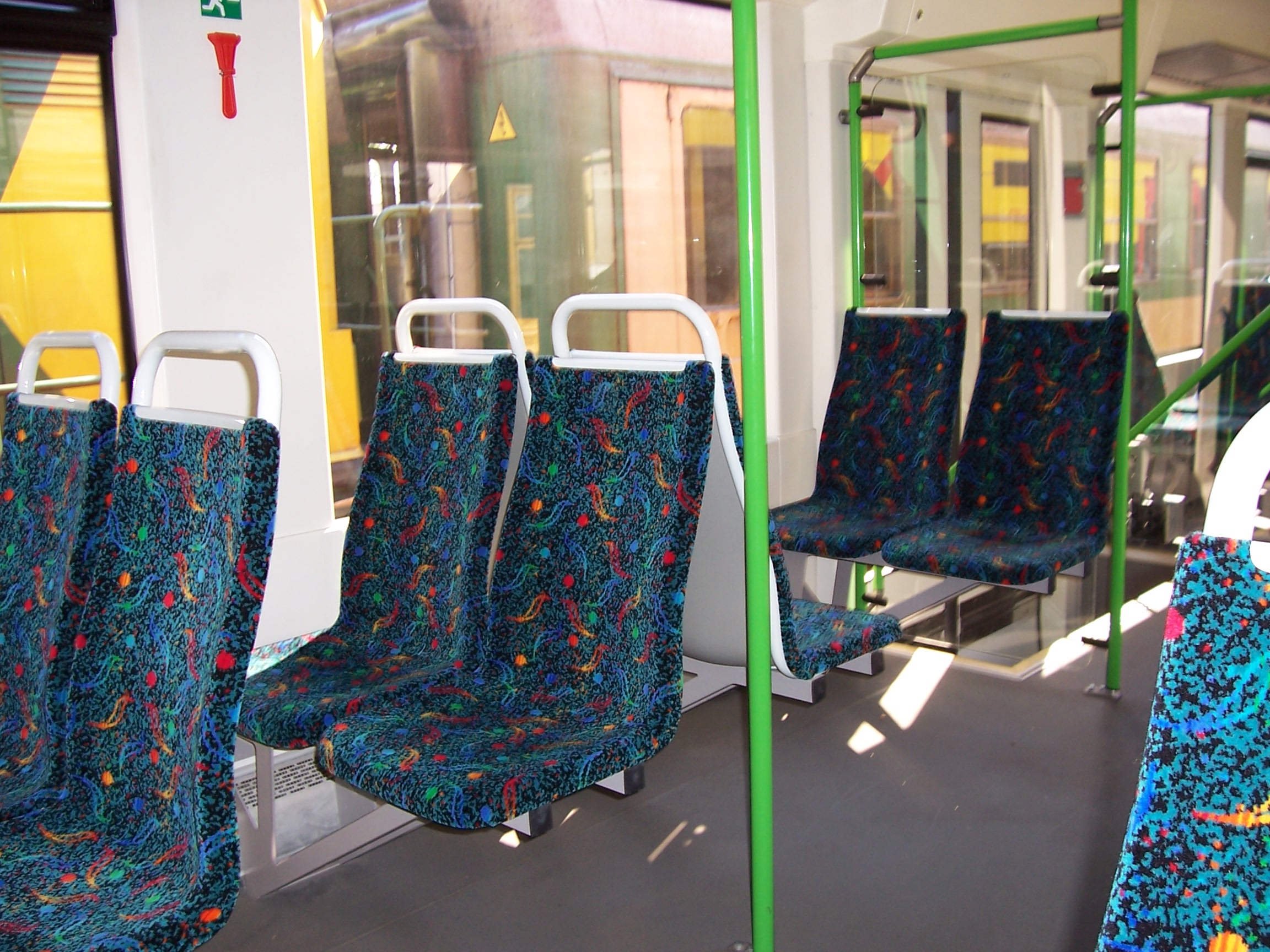
214Ma (SA103-005)

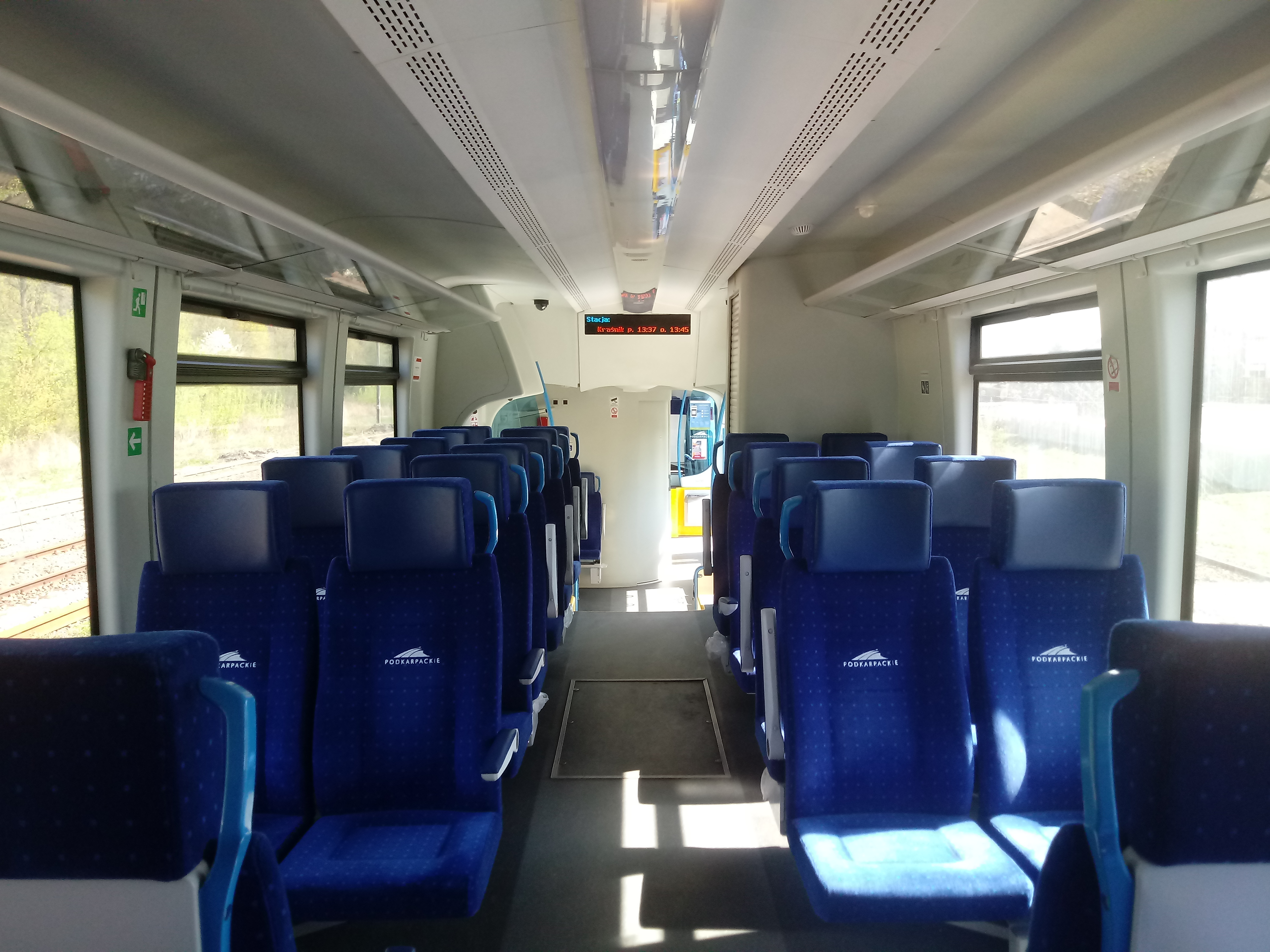
214Mb (SA135-023)

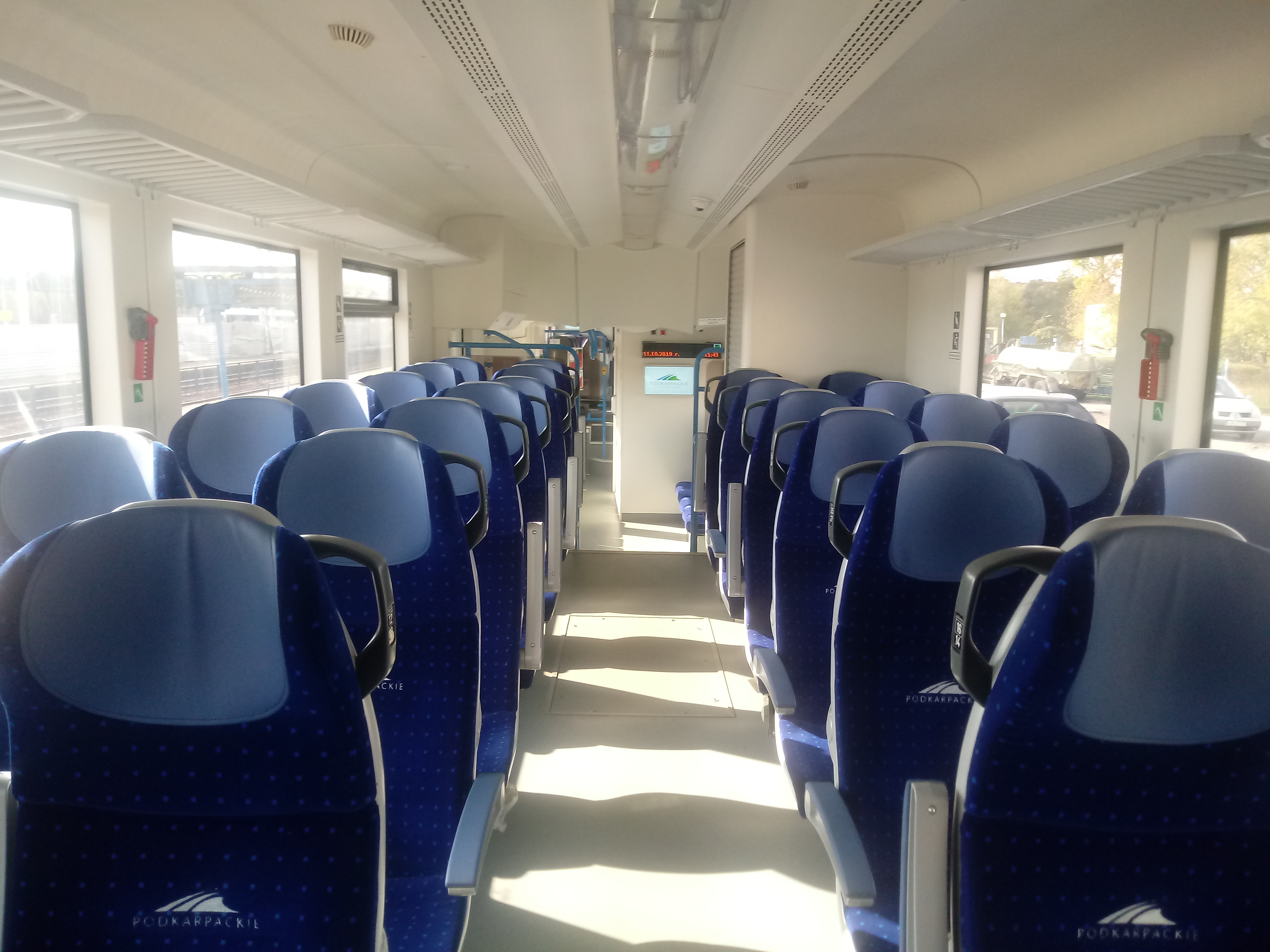
214Mb Mińsk (SA135-012)

=== Safety ===
The 214Mx vehicles are equipped with standard train protection systems: an active vigilance control device, automatic train braking, Radio-Stop, and fire detection signaling.

=== Modernizations ===
==== Lower Silesian ====
At the turn of 2016 and 2017, the Lower Silesian SA106-011 underwent a revision repair, which included repainting and replacing passenger seats.

In early 2018, the SA135-003 was modernized, receiving external reflectors, USB chargers, and new seats during the process.

==== Kuyavian-Pomeranian ====
In 2011, plans were made to modernize the SA106-001 and convert it into a two-section vehicle. A contract was signed between the Kuyavian-Pomeranian Voivodeship and Pesa (selected without a tender), but the agreement was annulled by the National Chamber of Appeal after an appeal by Newag.

==== Lublin ====
In October 2015, the local government signed a contract with Pesa to modernize SA103-005, 007, and 012. The modernization included replacing passenger seats, updating the vehicle monitoring system, overhauling the air conditioning system, replacing luggage racks, installing air dryers, and changing pneumatic connections to threaded connections.

==== Opole ====
In 2014, SA103-003 and 004 were sent to Pesa for inspections, which included replacing the seats.

==== Subcarpathian ====
On 24 June 2014, the Subcarpathian Voivodeship signed a contract with Pesa for the modernization and revision repair of SA103-001 and 002. The modernization included installing monitoring systems, dynamic passenger information systems, passenger counting systems, and ticket vending machines. The driver’s cab was also modified, and the vehicle was repainted.

On 10 June 2015, the voivodeship announced a tender for the modernization of SA135-010 to 014, which included equipping the vehicles with monitoring systems, dynamic passenger information systems, passenger counting systems, ticket vending machines, and Wi-Fi. All seats were to be replaced, and the vehicles repainted. Pesa won the tender, but the contract was not signed.

In early November 2015, the voivodeship announced a tender to equip SA135-012 to 014 with ticket vending machines.

In October 2017, another tender was announced for the modernization of SA135-010 to 014, with similar scope as in 2015. Pesa submitted the only bid, and a contract was signed with them in March 2018 for the modernization.

==== West Pomeranian ====
At the end of 2011, SA103-008 underwent modernization at Pesa’s facilities. Passenger seats were replaced, and air conditioning, monitoring, and passenger information systems were installed. The vehicle was equipped with GPRS data transmission modules, location and technical condition monitoring systems, including fuel management control. It was also repainted in the new colors of the voivodeship. By the end of 2012, the other two vehicles of this type owned by the West Pomeranian Voivodeship underwent the same modernization. In early 2013, it was decided to equip these railcars with Wi-Fi. Pesa won the tender for this task.

== Operation ==
Owner	Operator	Type	Series	Numbers	Years delivered	Quantity	Sources
Lower Silesian Voivodeship	Lower Silesian Railways	214M	SA106	011	2005	10	
Lower Silesian Voivodeship	Lower Silesian Railways	214Mb	SA135	001–009	2010–2011	10	
Kuyavian-Pomeranian Voivodeship	Arriva RP	214M	SA106	001–002, 004–006, 010, 012–014, 016–019	2002–2007	13	
Lublin Voivodeship	Polregio	214Ma	SA103	005, 007, 012	2005–2006	3	
Masovian Voivodeship	Masovian Railways	214Mb	SA135	015–018, 021–022, 024	2010–2015	7	
Opole Voivodeship	Polregio	214Ma	SA103	003–004, 013	2005–2007	3	
Subcarpathian Voivodeship	Polregio	214Ma	SA103	001–002	2004	8	
Subcarpathian Voivodeship	Polregio	214Mb	SA135	010–014, 023	2010–2016	8	
Pomeranian Voivodeship	Polregio	214Ma	SA103	006, 011	2005	2	
Warmian-Masurian Voivodeship	Polregio	214M	SA106	003, 008–009	2005–2007	3 (5)	
West Pomeranian Voivodeship	Polregio	214Ma	SA103	008–010	2005	3	
Polregio		214M	SA106	007, 015	2021	2	
Polregio		214Mb	SA135	019–020	2013	2	
Total:						56	

=== Lower Silesian ===
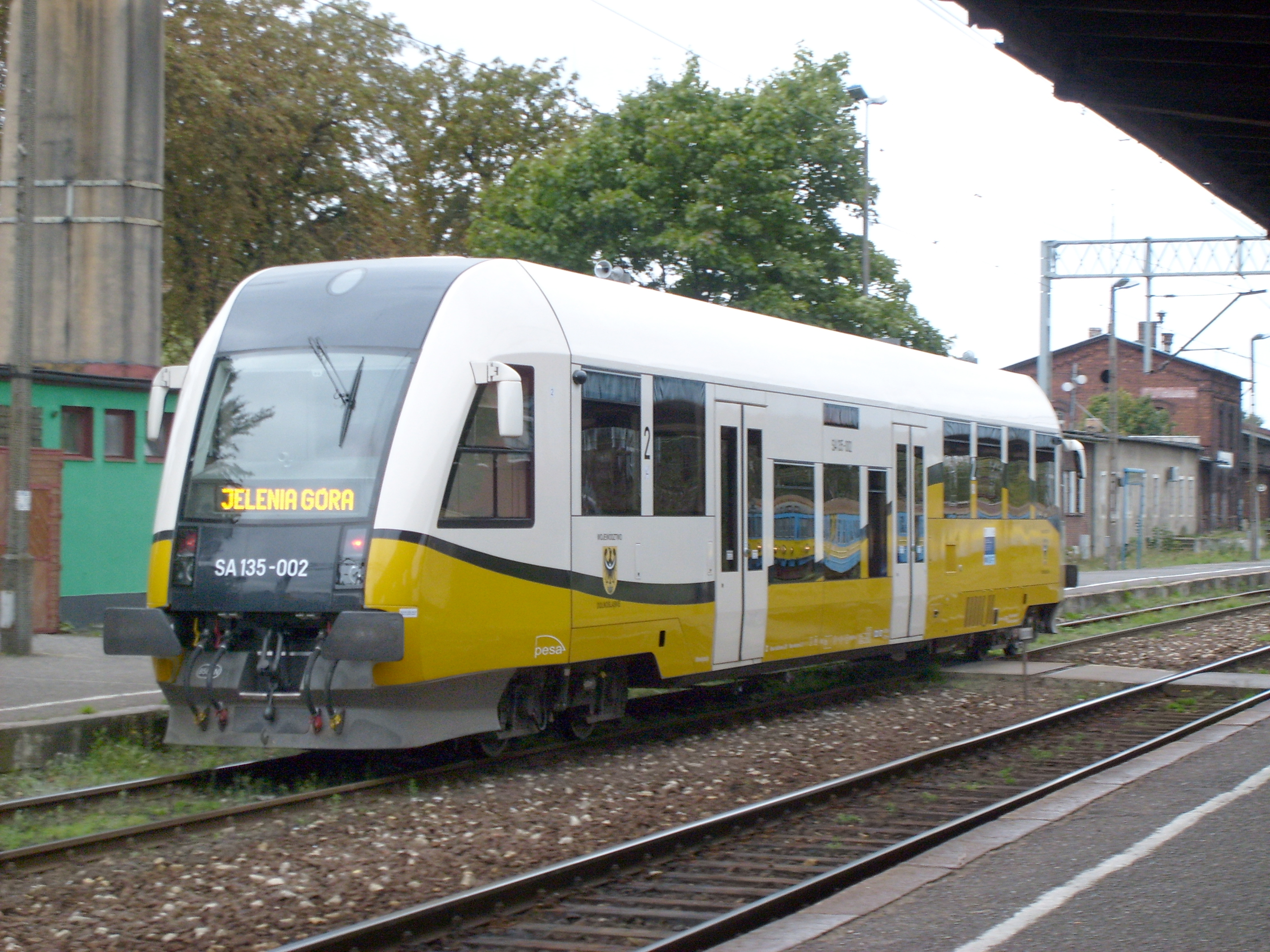
Lower Silesian SA135-002

The first single-section vehicle of type 214M (series SA106) was delivered in 2005.

On 16 July 2007, the Lower Silesian Marshal’s Office placed another order with Pesa for 3 single-section and 5 two-section diesel vehicles (Pesa 218M). All three single-section vehicles were delivered in the first half of 2008.

On 14 December 2008, all vehicles previously provided to Polregio, including two Kolzam 212M, four Pesa 214M, and six Pesa 218M, were transferred to the newly established Lower Silesian Railways.

On 27 May 2010, a contract was awarded to Mińsk Mazowiecki Railway Repair Plant for the delivery of another 6 single-section and 3 two-section vehicles (Pesa 218M). These new vehicles were ordered to replenish the Lower Silesian Railways fleet. In mid-November 2010, Mińsk Mazowiecki Railway Repair Plant delivered 3 vehicles of type 214Mb (series SA135).

In January 2015, during the finale of the Great Orchestra of Christmas Charity, the name for SA135-001 was auctioned (won by the company AK Media), and in January 2016 for SA135-002 (auction won by the company Trako). At the beginning of 2017, the name for SA135-002 was auctioned again, this time won by the fintech company Cinkciarz.pl.

=== Kuyavian-Pomeranian ===
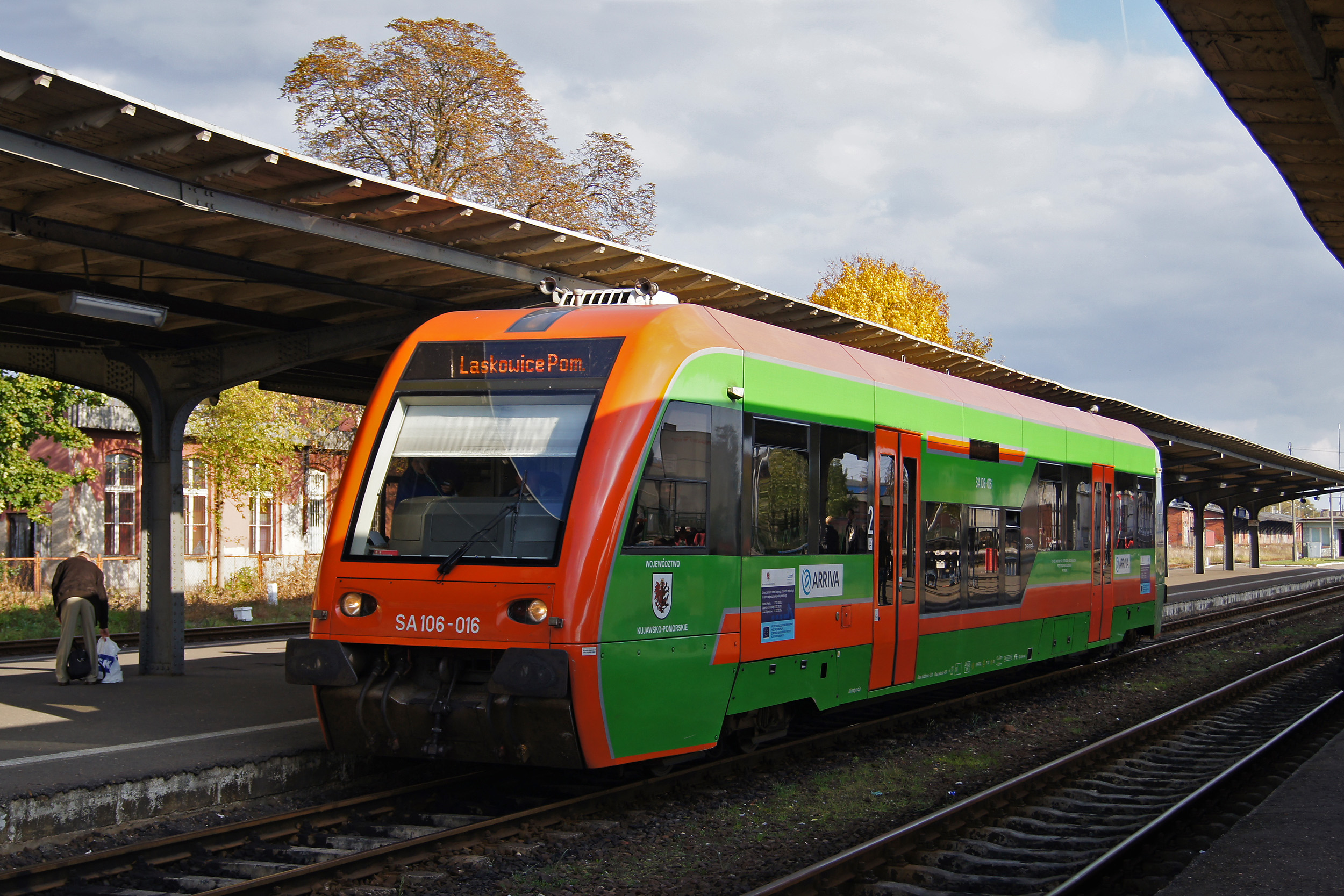
Kuyavian-Pomeranian SA106-016 (2011)

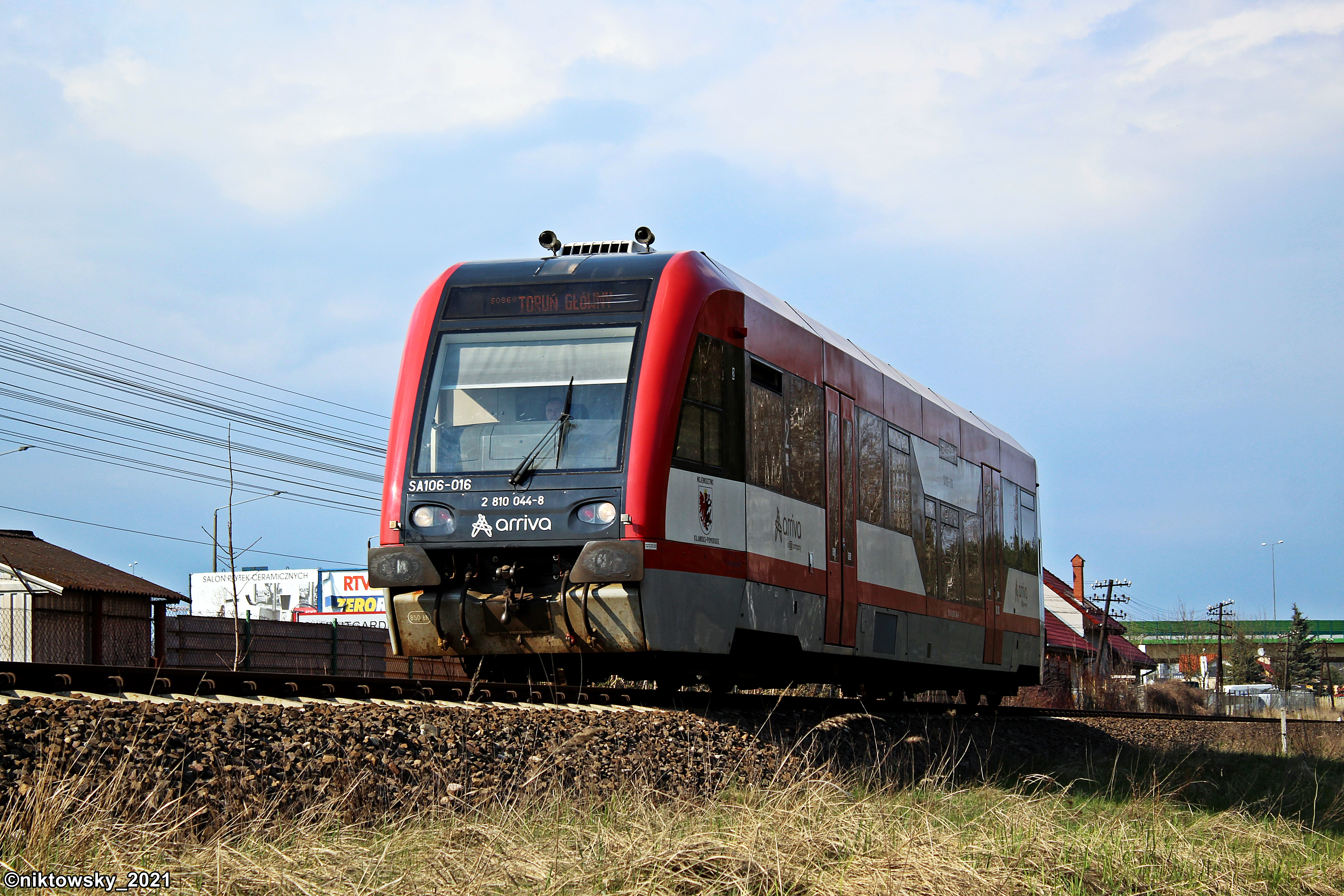
Kuyavian-Pomeranian SA106-016 (2021)

The Kuyavian-Pomeranian Voivodeship has the largest number of Pesa 214M vehicles, all owned by the regional government. Initially operated by Polregio, they have been operated by Arriva since 9 December 2007. On 18 October 2002, a contract was signed for the delivery of eight 214M railcars for the Kuyavian-Pomeranian Voivodeship. One unit was delivered in 2002 and 2003 each, and three units in 2004 and 2005 each.

On 5 December 2008, a contract was signed for the delivery of another 5 vehicles. The delivery of these small and economical vehicles sparked interest from regional authorities in reviving local lines, including from Bydgoszcz to Unisław. High passenger volumes on some lines necessitated double runs or additional carriages. The former option required two vehicles, while the latter complicated maneuvering due to the lack of a cab at the other end of the train. To improve this situation, the regional government ordered trailer cars with a driver’s cab fully compatible with the SA106 – SA123.

In May 2012, Pesa won the tender to modernize two of the oldest vehicles.

=== Lublin ===
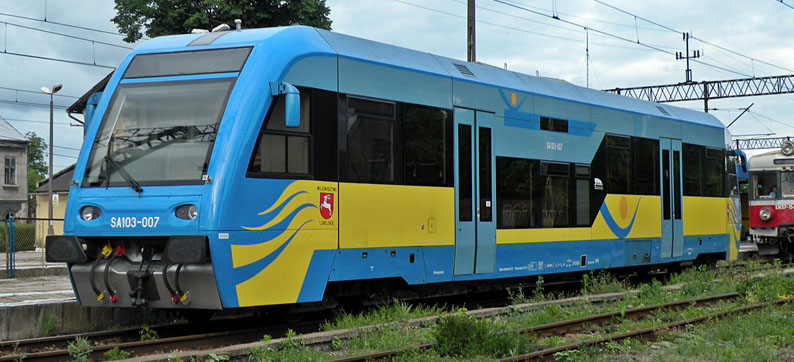
Lublin SA103-007 (2009)

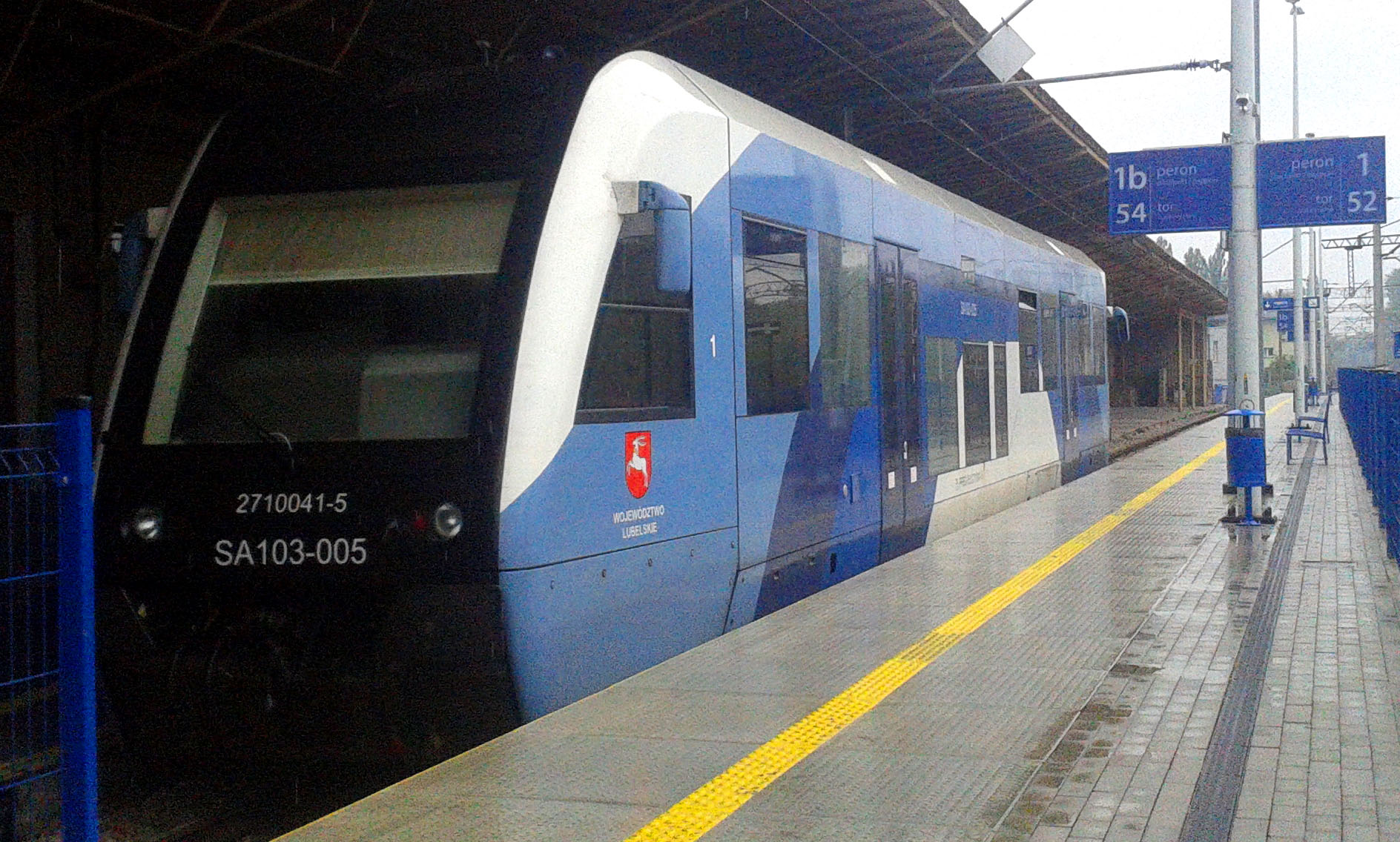
Lublin SA103-005 (2015)

On 10 August 2005, two 214Ma vehicles were ceremoniously handed over to the Lublin Voivodeship. The vehicles, designated SA103-005 and -007, were intended for the Lublin–Rzeczyca Ziemiańska–Rozwadów route. This was a new, extended route from Rzeczyca to Rozwadów, made possible by the new Pesa vehicles.

A third vehicle of this type (SA103-012) was produced by Pesa for Lublin in 2006.

=== Masovian ===
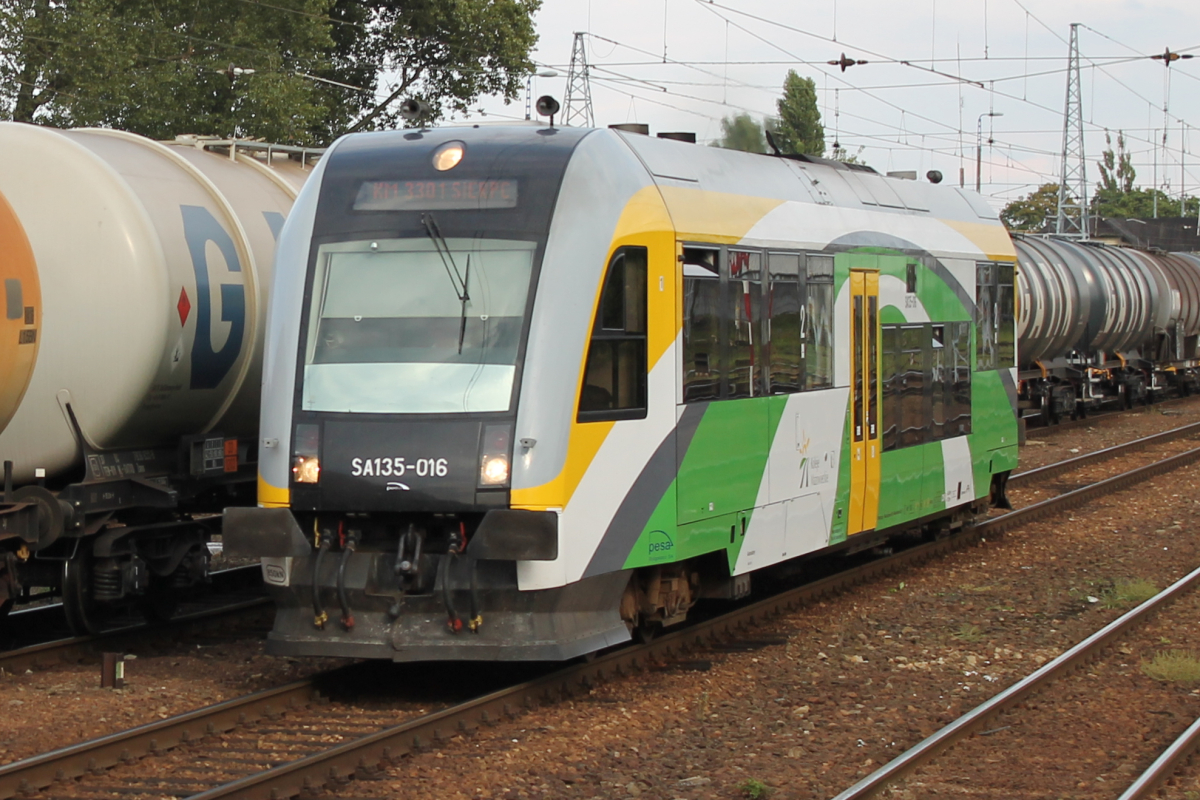
Masovian SA135-016

On 8 November 2011, a contract was signed for the delivery of two 214Mb railcars for the Masovian Voivodeship. The handover ceremony for both vehicles to Masovian Railways took place on 30 December 2011 in Płock. The new railcars were designated to service the Nasielsk–Sierpc and Kutno–Sierpc routes.

A contract for the delivery of two more vehicles of the same type was signed on 10 July 2012. The new railcars were to be delivered to the customer by November 30 and assigned to the Warsaw–Ostrołęka, Nasielsk–Sierpc, Sierpc–Płock, and Sierpc–Kutno routes. The ceremonial reception of the vehicles took place on 18 December 2012 in Płock.

On 13 June 2014, a contract was signed for the delivery of 2 additional diesel railcars. On 27 November 2014, the carrier received the second of the ordered units.

On 16 June 2015, Masovian Railways ordered another 214Mb, which was delivered on 20 December 2015.

=== Opole ===
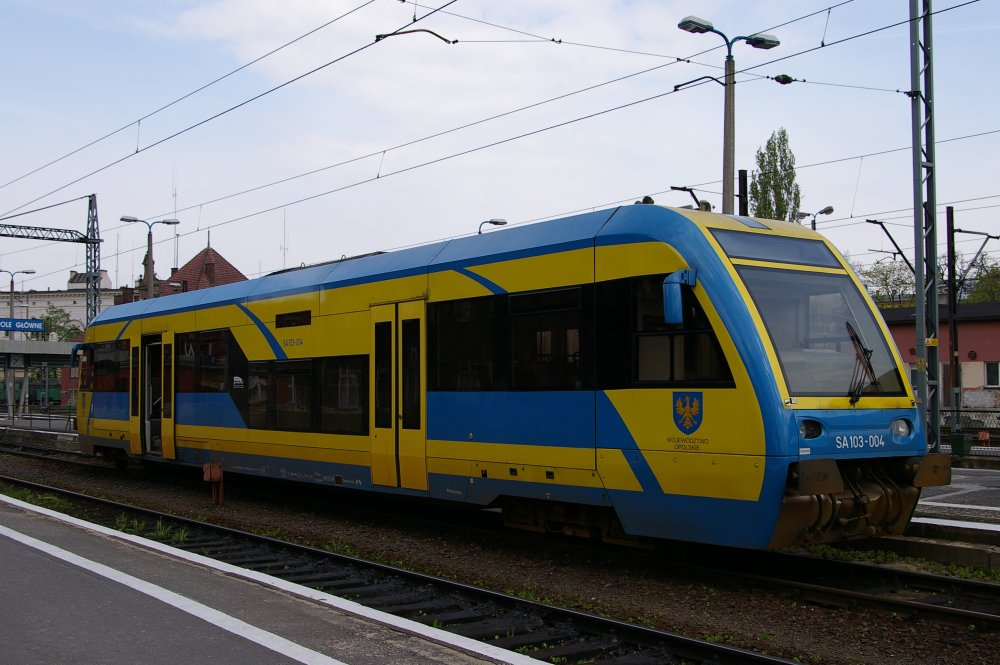
Opole SA103-004

On 6 June 2005, two 214Ma vehicles were handed over to the Opole Voivodeship. The deliveries were completed by 21 June 2005, and on 1 July 2005, both vehicles (SA103 no. 003 and 004) began operations.

In December 2008, the vehicles were directed to service the reactivated Nysa–Brzeg line.

On 23 September 2013, the Opole SA103-003 collided with a truck at a railway crossing in Chrościna in the Nysa County, causing significant damage to the vehicle.

=== Subcarpathian ===
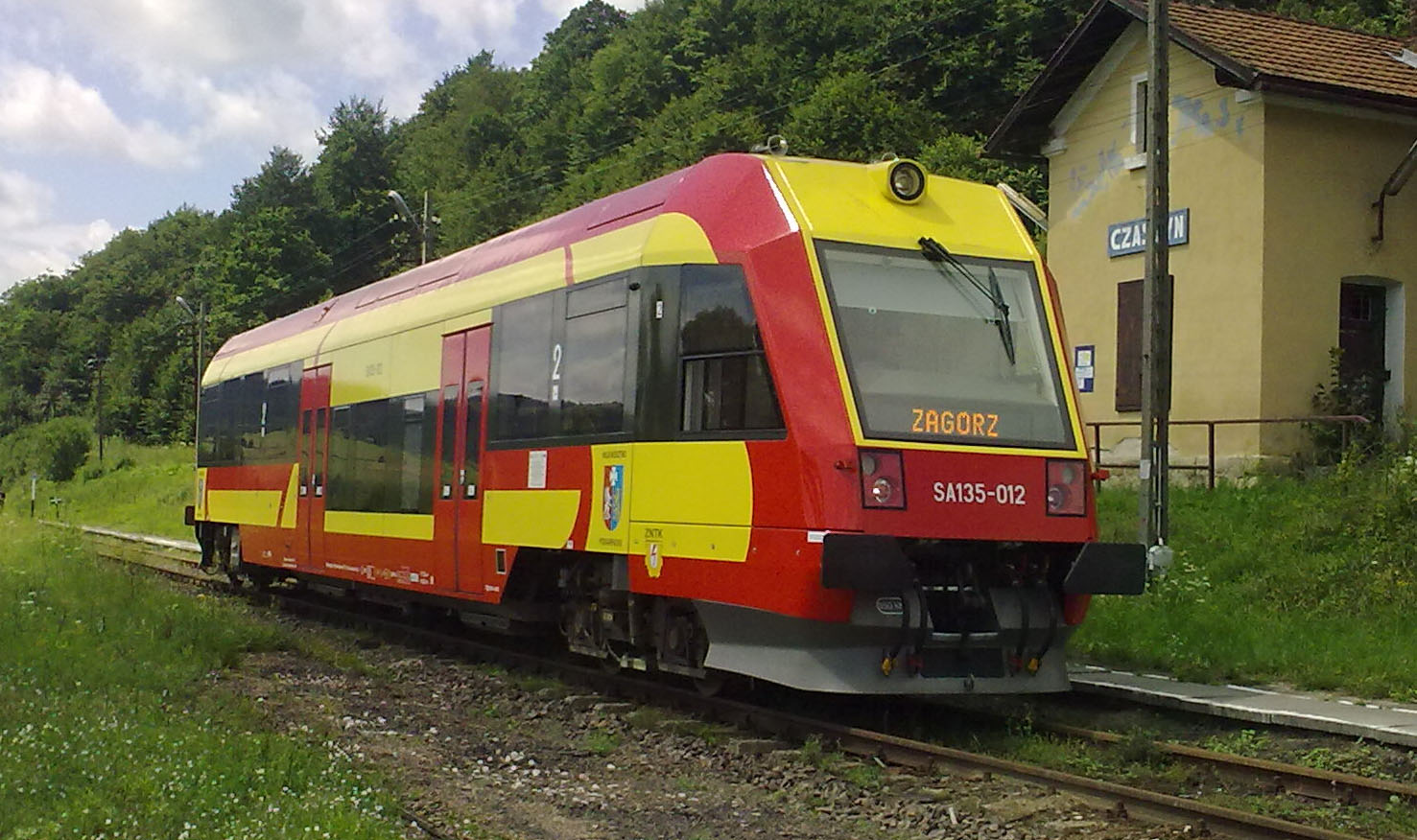
Subcarpathian SA135-012 (2011)

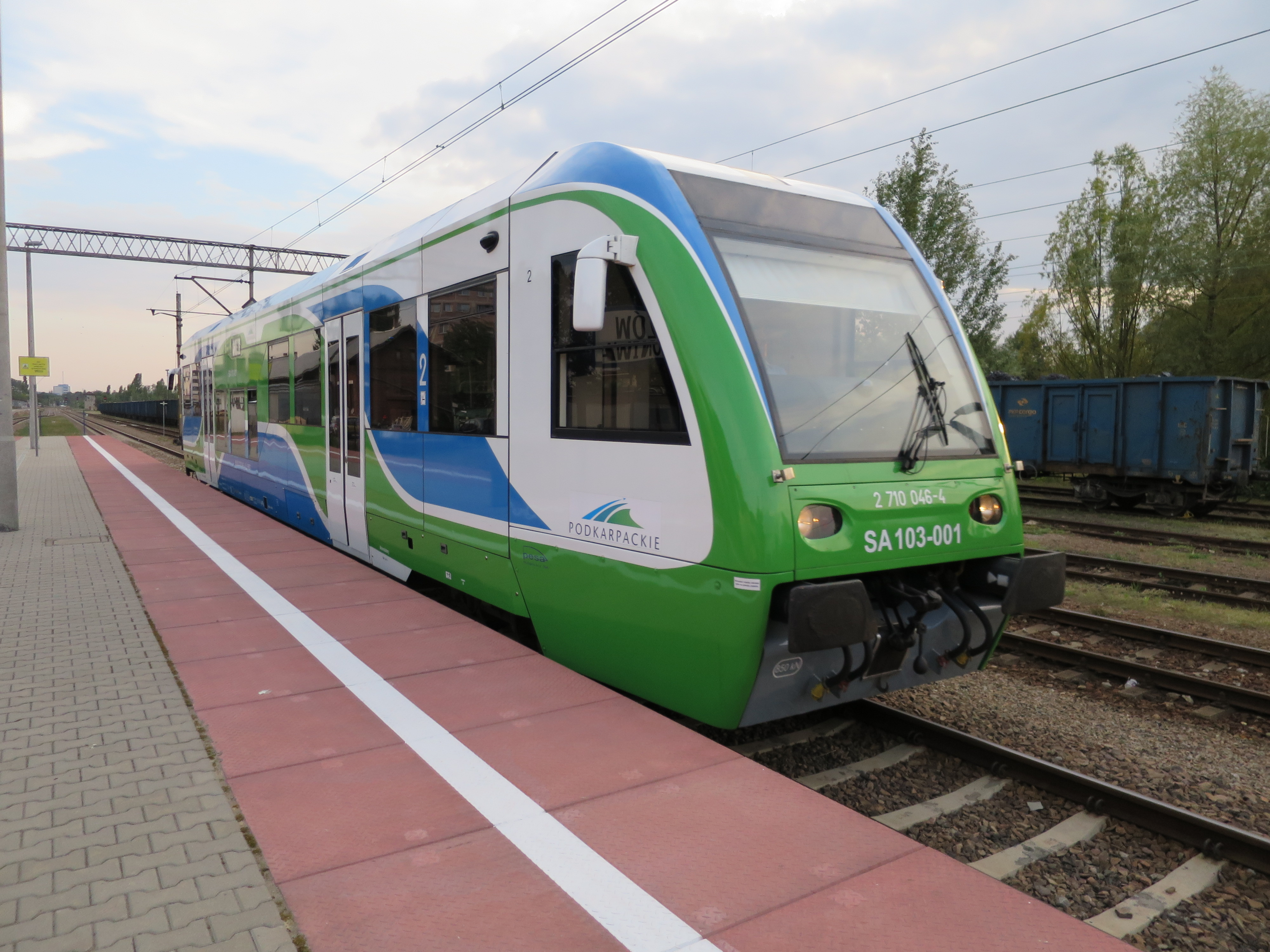
Subcarpathian SA103-001 (2015)

On 6 June 2005, representatives of Pesa handed over two 214Ma vehicles to the authorities of the Subcarpathian Voivodeship. The new diesel railcars, designated SA103-001 and SA103-002, were primarily assigned to service the Jasło–Rzeszów and Zagórz–Jasło routes, but also to replace the Subcarpathian RegioVans (SA109) during their maintenance on the Jarosław–Munina–Horyniec-Zdrój–Hrebenne and Dębica–Tarnobrzeg routes. From 2006, they began to regularly service all 4 routes alternately with the SA109.

On 16 September 2010, in the Subcarpathian Voivodeship Marshal's Office in Rzeszów, representatives of the voivodeship and Mińsk Mazowiecki Railway Repair Plant signed a contract for the delivery of 5 diesel motor railcars. The first two 214Mb Mińsk-1 vehicles were received by the customer on December 30, and on 4 January 2011, they began servicing the Rzeszów–Jarosław–Horyniec-Zdrój and Rzeszów–Jasło–Zagórz routes. The third SA135 was delivered on 2 February 2011, and the fifth in June.

In the summer of 2011, the Subcarpathian SA135, along with the Lublin two-unit SA134, serviced the Rzeszów–Lublin route.

On 8 June 2015, the Subcarpathian Voivodeship ordered another single-unit vehicle. It was delivered with more than a month's delay on 6 January 2016.

On 1 August 2015, the Subcarpathian PR Branch launched a weekend service between Jasło and Komańcza, serviced by one of the SA103 vehicles. The service operated until September 27. On December 13, the weekend service to Komańcza was reinstated in an extended route from Rzeszów to Komańcza.

In February 2017, the Subcarpathian SA135 received permanent approval to operate on the Slovak railway network.

=== Pomeranian ===
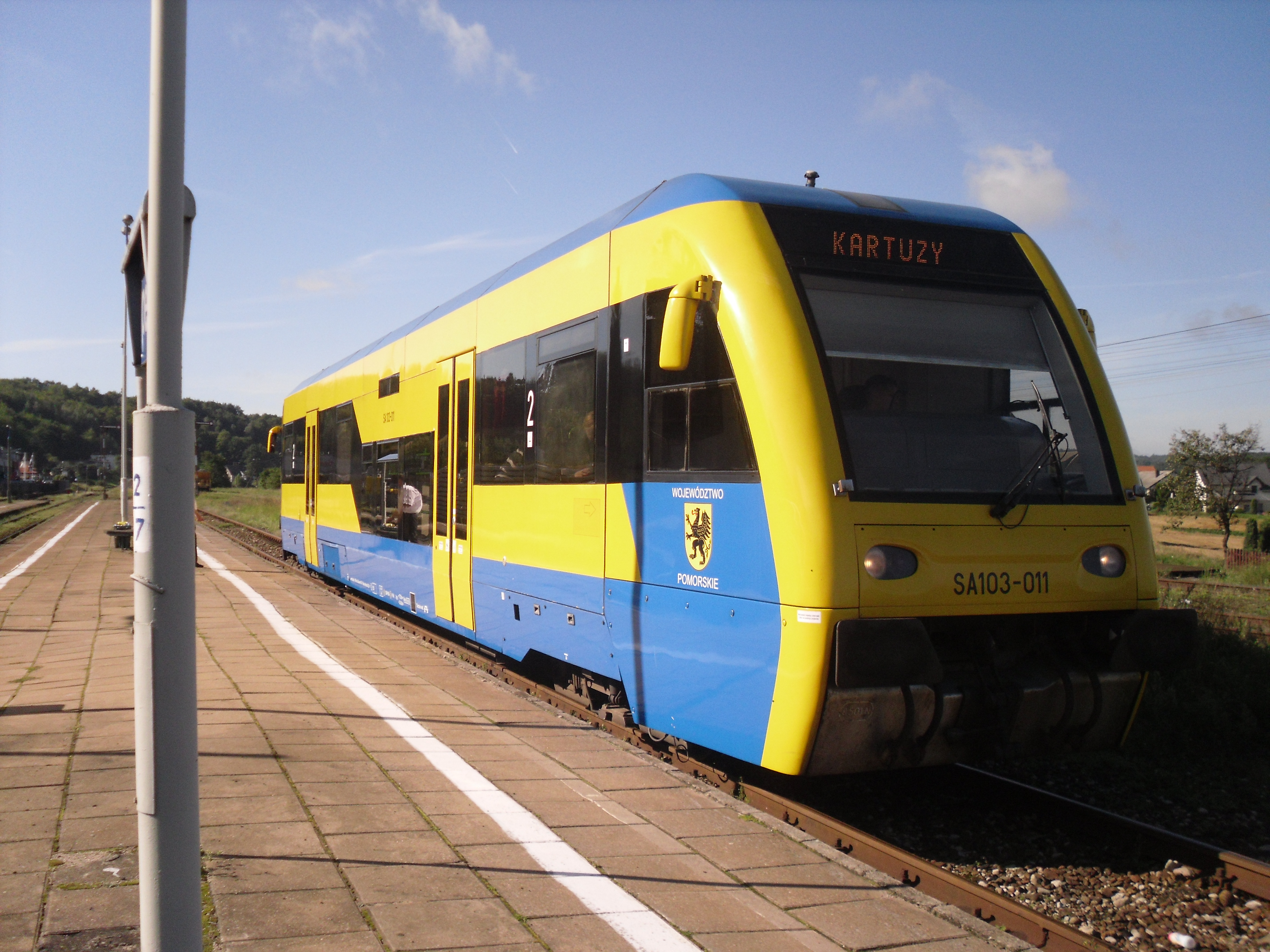
Pomeranian SA103-011

On 7 December 2004, Pesa signed a contract with the Pomeranian Voivodeship for the delivery of two SA103 vehicles and one two-unit SA131. The first of them (SA103-006) was put into operation in August, and the second (SA103-011) on 2 November 2005. The vehicles, operating as a pair, were assigned to service the Gdynia–Kościerzyna route. Initially, they serviced the least crowded routes, replacing two-car sets hauled by SU46 locomotives. Until 1 June 2006, they also serviced some routes on the Lębork–Łeba line. After that, the Pomeranian Polregio branch completely suspended passenger services on this line. The West Pomeranian SA103 serviced the Szczecinek–Słupsk section. A decline in passenger numbers between Kościerzyna and Gdynia resulted in the SA103 beginning to also service more crowded routes in tandem with the SA131 or SA132 from 2007. They also operated individually during off-peak hours. In July 2015, the SA103-011 railcar was sent for tests on the Pomeranian Metropolitan Railway line.

=== Warmian-Masurian ===
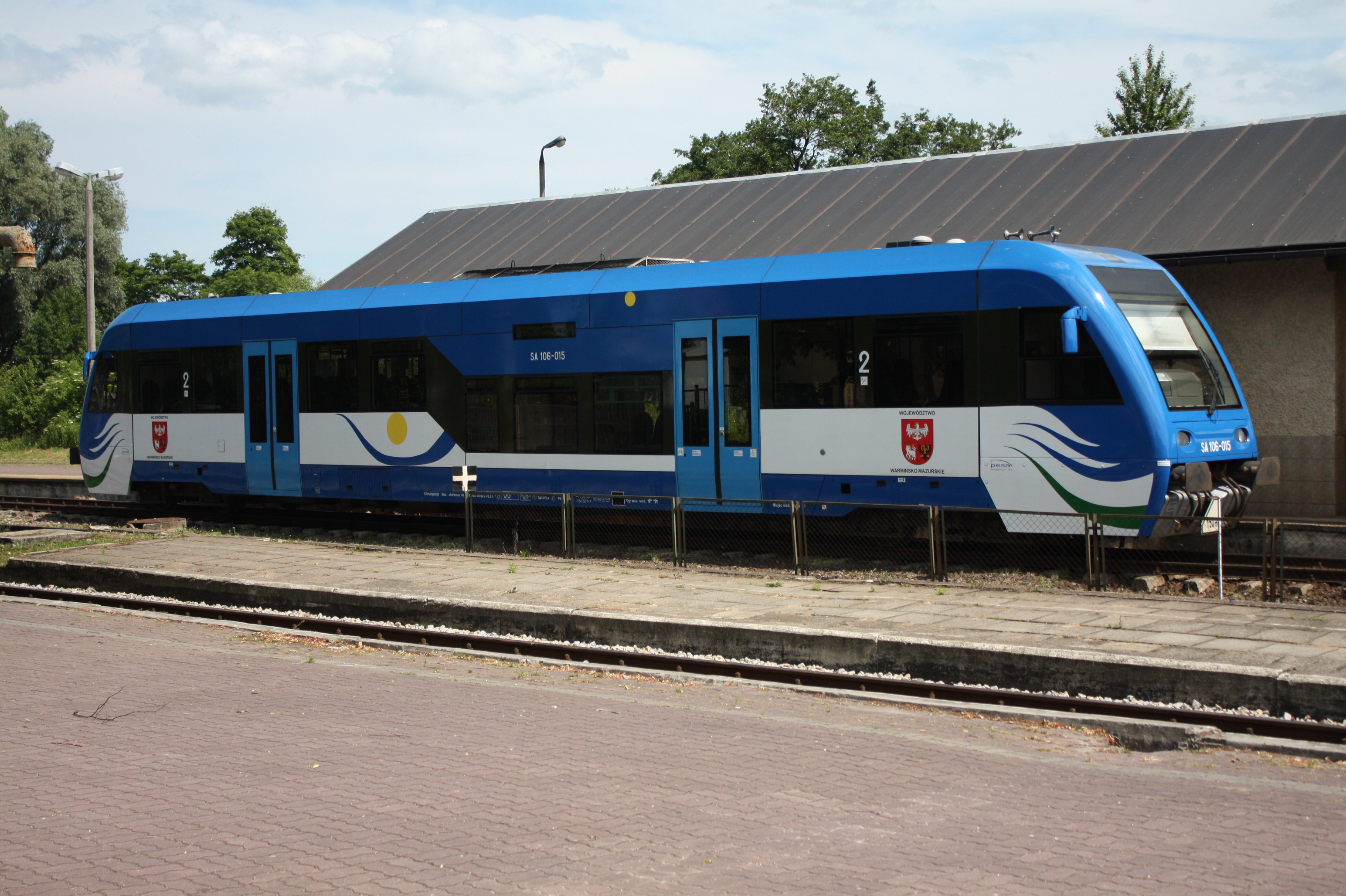
Warmian-Masurian SA106-015

The manufacturer handed over four SA106 vehicles to the Warmian-Masurian Voivodeship in 2005. The SA106-003 had covered 1 million km by 2011. The SA106 vehicles operate on non-electrified or partially electrified local lines in the Olsztyn hub and on the Braniewo–Elbląg route. Due to insufficient capacity on some routes, they operate with a 120A trailer car equipped with its own heating.

On 21 January 2016, the Olsztyn Główny–Szymany Airport service was launched, operated by the SA106 and SA133 vehicles owned by the voivodeship.

In May 2021, the voivodeship sold two vehicles (SA106-007 and 015) to Polregio.

=== West Pomeranian ===
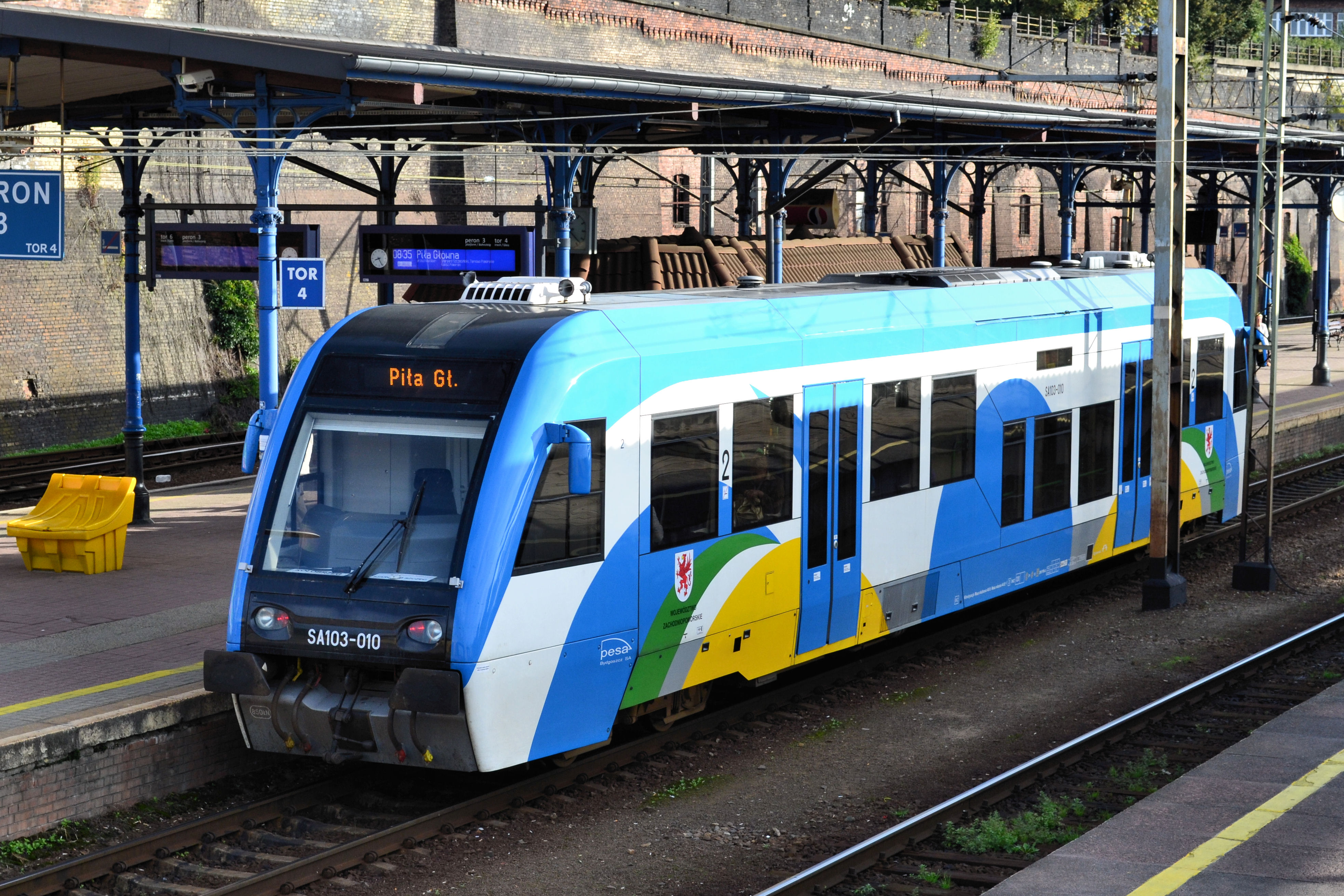
West Pomeranian SA103-010

In September 2005, three 214Ma vehicles were handed over to the West Pomeranian Voivodeship in Kołobrzeg (the last of them was handed over on September 25). The vehicles designated as SA103-008, 009, and 010 were assigned to service the Kołobrzeg–Goleniów–Szczecin and Darłowo–Sławno routes, among others. The West Pomeranian SA103 also serviced the inter-voivodeship Szczecinek–Słupsk section.

=== Polregio ===
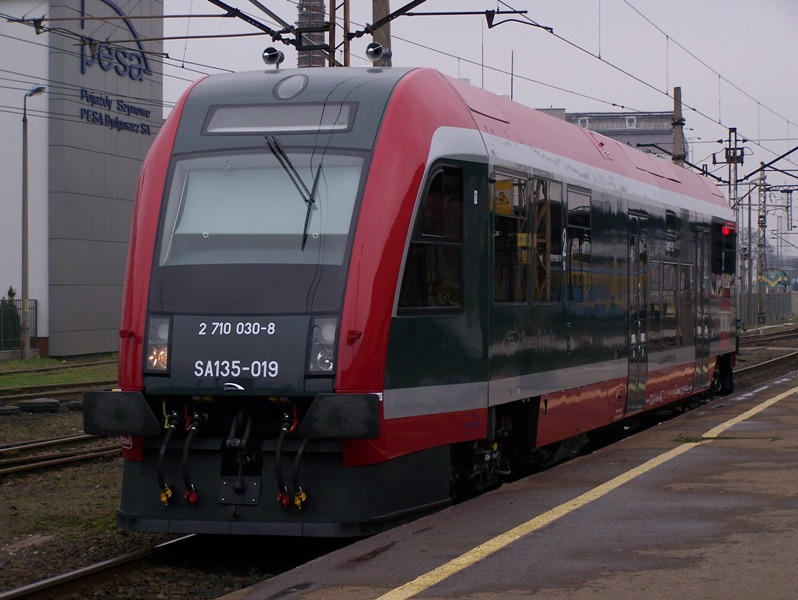
SA135-019 of Polregio

On 1 July 2013, a contract was signed with Polregio for the leasing of 2 diesel railcars. The vehicles were purchased to service the Koluszki–Opoczno route, previously serviced by SN81-006, which was designated for scrapping after an accident on 2 September 2013.

The first vehicle (SA135-019) was delivered to the PR Łódź base in Idzikowice on December 5, and on December 11, it was presented at the Łódź Kaliska railway station, and on December 12, it began operations on the Koluszki–Opoczno route. The second vehicle (SA135-020) was delivered on December 23 and began operations on January 3.

On summer Sundays in 2015 and on September 13 during the presidential harvest festival, one of the vehicles serviced the Łódź–Spała route.

In May 2021, the carrier purchased SA106-007 and 015 from the Warmian-Masurian Voivodeship, which shortly thereafter were sent to the Podlachia branch to service routes from Białystok to Waliły, Suwałki, Czeremcha, and Hajnówka.

== Awards and distinctions ==
- 2001 – the Engineer Ernest Malinowski award at the Trako Fair in Oliwa.
- 2002 – Grand Prix of the Pomeranian Fair at the International Railway Fair Interrail 2002.
