= Pesa Jazz =

Polish low floor tram

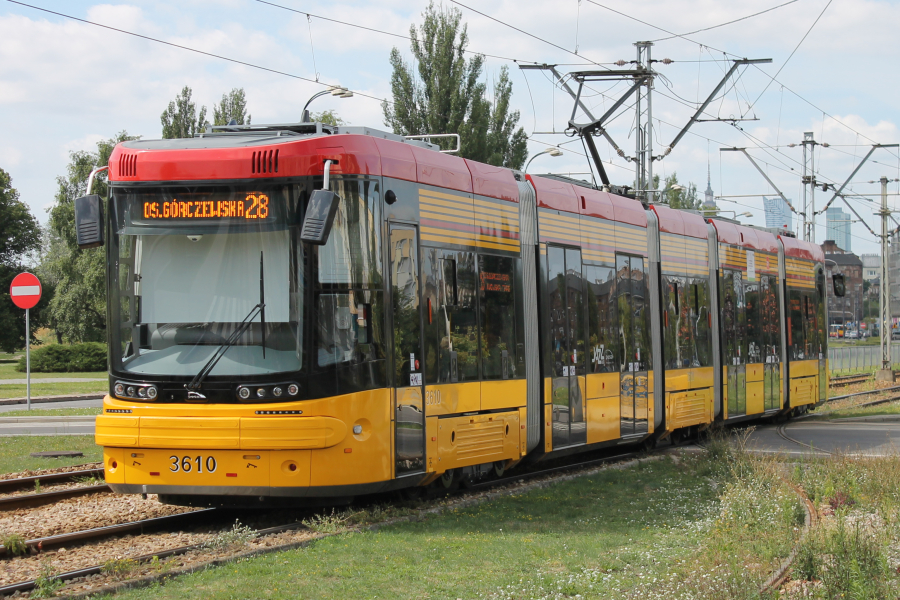
- A Pesa Jazz Duo 128N in Warsaw.
- Manufacturer: (Poland) Pesa SA
- Built at: Bydgoszcz
- Constructed: 2013-2015
- Entered service: 2013
- Number built: 85
- Number in service: 85
- Capacity: 27/28
- Operators: Tramwaje Warszawskie (Warsaw), ZKM Gdańsk (Gdańsk)

Specifications
- Train length: 19,300–29,700 mm 63 ft 3 3/4 in – 97 ft 5 1/4 in
- Width: 2,400 mm (7 ft 10 1/2 in)
- Height: 3,076 mm (10 ft 1 in)
- Floor height: 350 mm (1 ft 1 3/4 in)
- Articulated sections: 3/5
- Track gauge: 1,435 mm (4 ft 8 1/2 in)

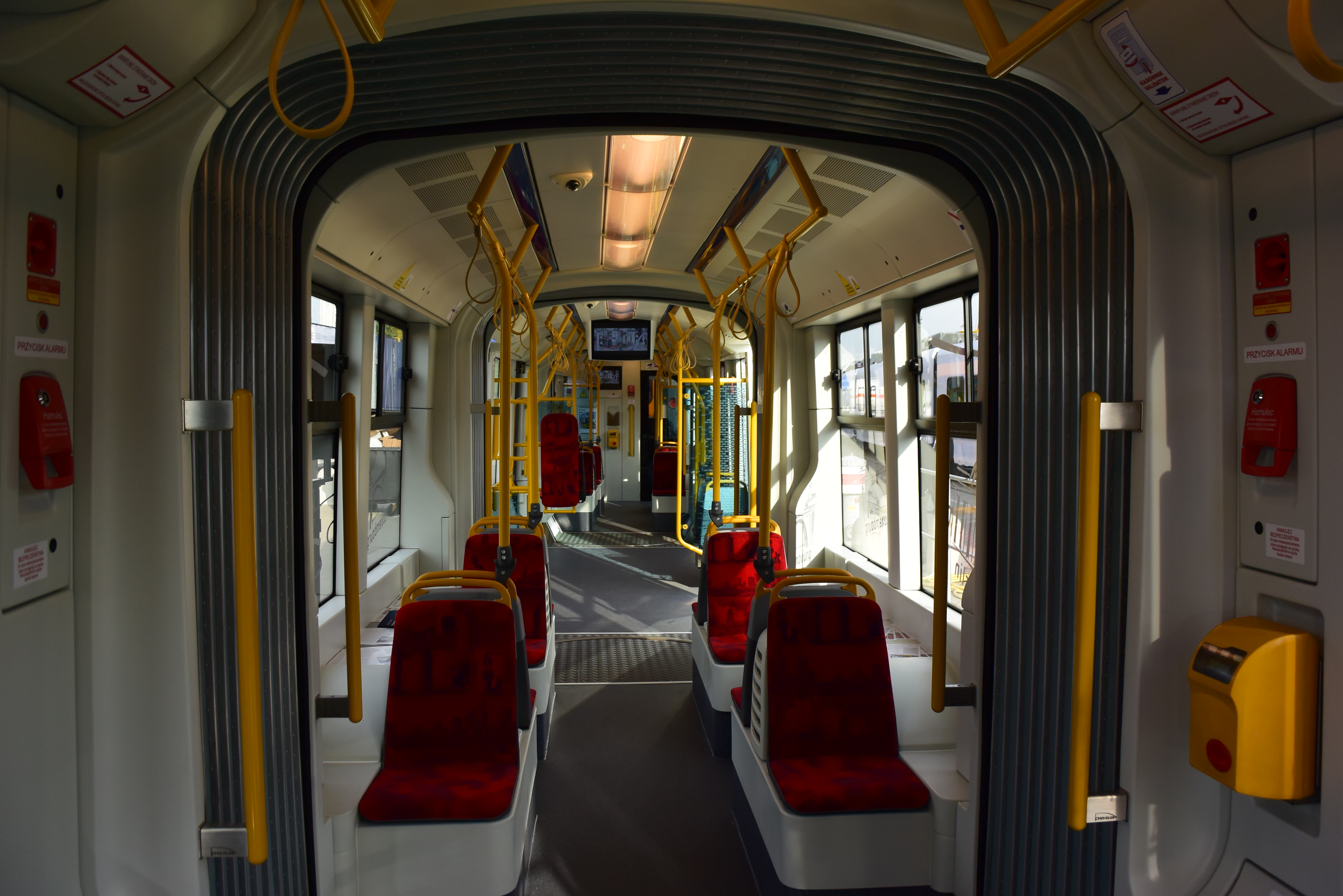
The interior of a Jazz Duo.

The Pesa Jazz is a family of low floor, articulated and multiple carriage trams by Pesa SA which have been manufactured since 2013. The trams are currently serving the cities of Gdańsk and Warsaw.

== History ==
The Pesa Jazz family is the successor to the previous families of trams. The tram was designed for use in Warsaw. Comparing the Jazz to its predecessor, the 120N, it has a slightly shorter length, non-axle trucks and greater energy storage (enabling movement for about 100 metres (328 ft 1 in) without power). On 21 March 2013, an agreement was signed, leading to 45 128N trams being supplied to Warsaw. Later in the same year, on 25 September, an agreement was signed that led to 5 128NG trams being supplied to Gdańsk. Warsaw later signed another agreement, which led to 30 more trams being supplied.
