= Pesa Sundeck =

Family of bilevel railcars

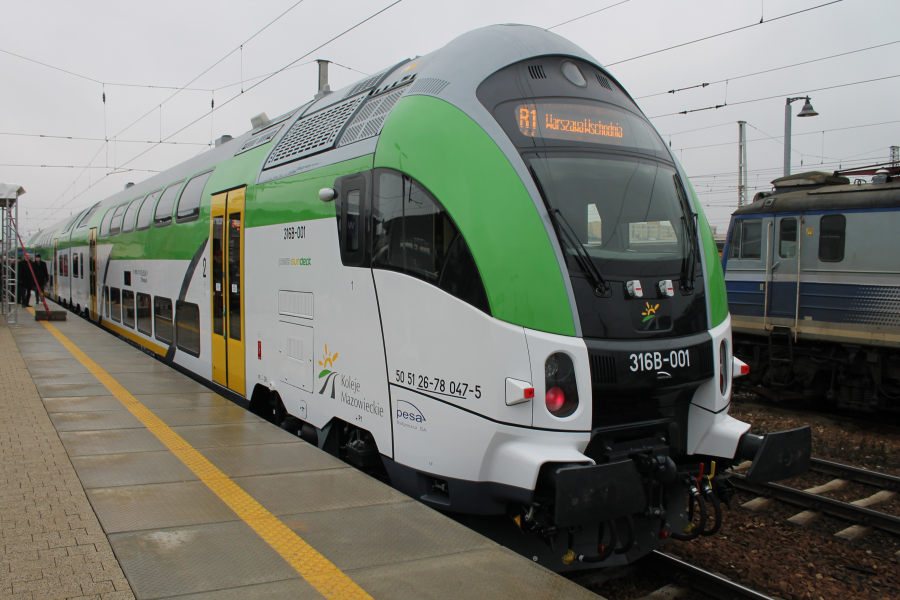
- Control car 316B-001 at the Warszawa Wschodnia railway station
- Manufacturer: Pesa
- Assembly: Bydgoszcz; Poland
- Constructed: 2014–2015
- Capacity: 230/245

Specifications
- Train length: 26,270 mm (1,034 in)/25,800 mm (1,020 in)
- Width: 2,778 mm (109.4 in)
- Height: 4,600 mm (180 in)
- Maximum speed: 160 km/h (99 mph)
- Weight: 57 t (56 long tons; 63 short tons)/56 t (55 long tons; 62 short tons)

Pesa Sundeck is a family of bilevel railcars manufactured by Pesa in Bydgoszcz. It includes control cars (construction type 316B) and intermediate cars (construction type 416B), which, when combined with locomotives from the Pesa Gama family, form trains in a push-pull system.

On 15 April 2014, Masovian Railways ordered 22 Sundeck railcars and 2 electric locomotives Gama. According to the contract, the vehicles were to be delivered by 17 August 2015, but production was delayed. At the end of September 2015, the Sundeck railcar family was unveiled at the Trako fair in Gdańsk. By mid-December 2015, production of all ordered vehicles was completed, and they were accepted by the end of 2015. They entered service on 31 January 2016.

== History ==
=== First bilevel railcars in Poland ===
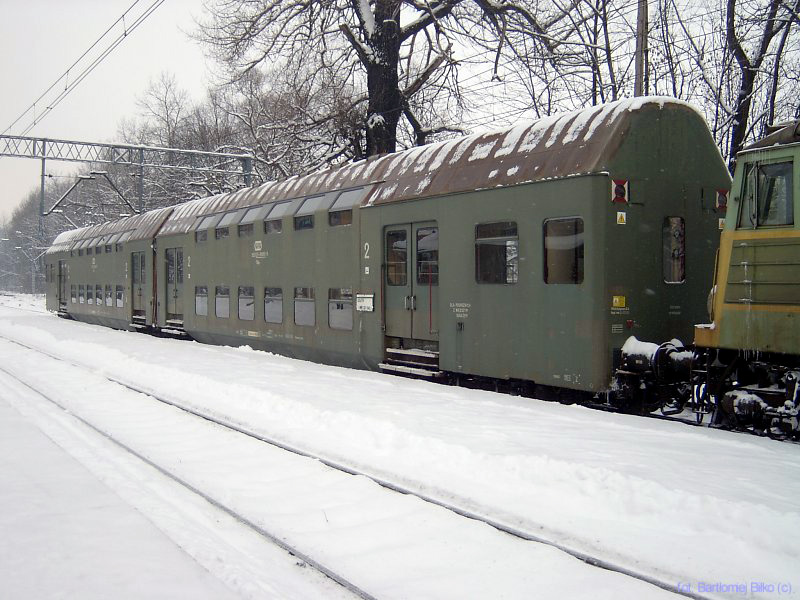
Railcar of the Bipa series

The first railway bilevel railcars operated in what is now Poland were two bilevel motor railcars of the Thomas system from 1883, belonging to the Oleśnica–Chojnice railway. The first such vehicle at the Polish State Railways was a railcar designated Breslau 970, which, during the modernization of Berlin's urban railway rolling stock, was transferred around 1912 to the Wrocław directorate. After World War I, it came to Poland and was assigned number 11344 BC. It was scrapped in 1931.

The first bilevel railcars produced in what is now Poland were manufactured in 1936 by Linke-Hofmann-Busch in Wrocław. After World War II, such vehicles were produced from 1952 for the Deutsche Reichsbahn and from 1959 for other socialist countries by the Waggonbau Görlitz factory. Between 1959 and 1977, Polish State Railways ordered and received a total of 473 four-car units and 57 single railcars, initially designated as the Bipa series, renamed Bhp in 1985. In 1974, Waggonbau Görlitz began serial production of a new type of bilevel railcar, free of the design flaws of earlier models. Between 1988 and 1989, 160 units were delivered to Poland, assigned the series Bdhpumn.

=== Origins of the Sundeck railcars ===
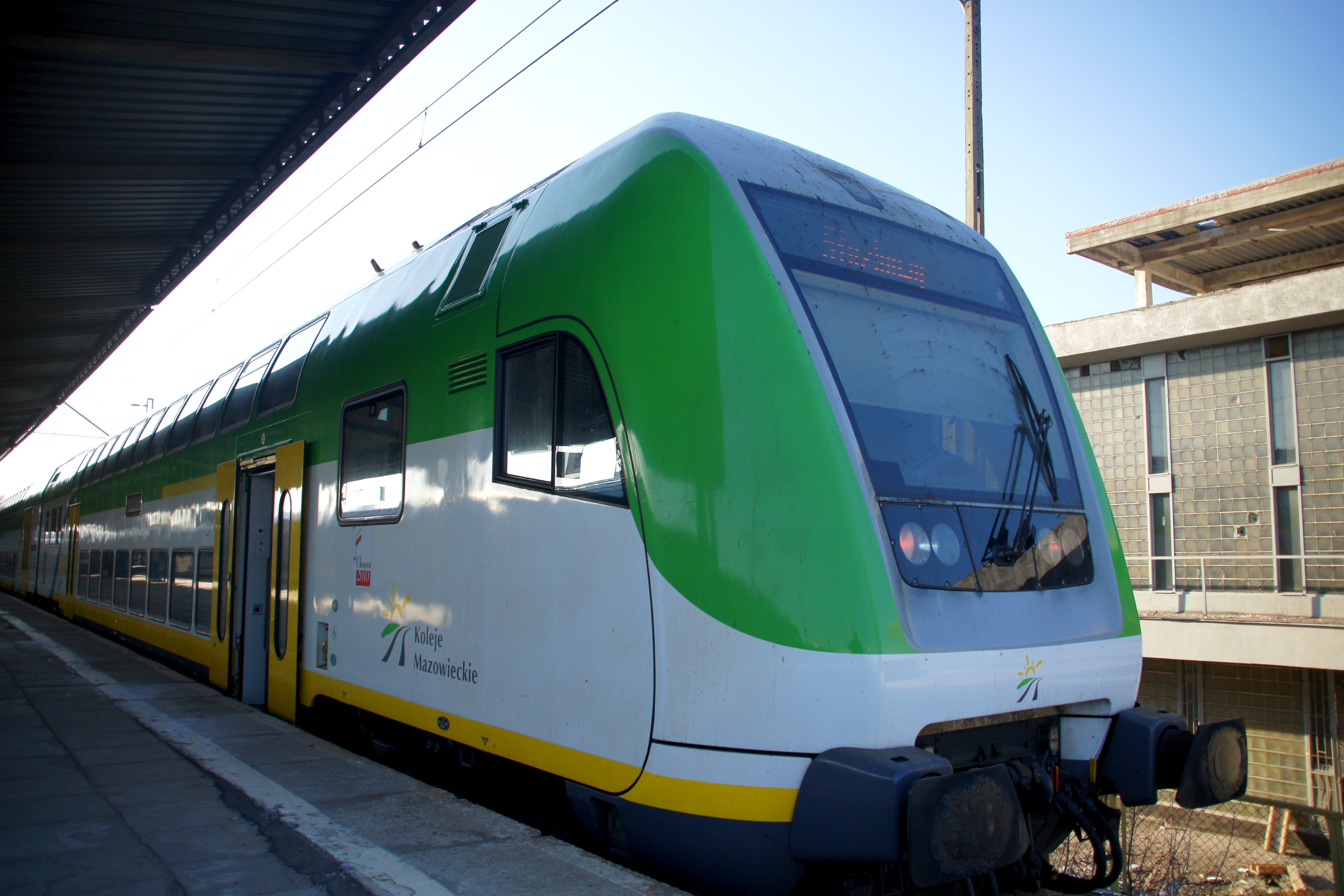
Bombardier Twindexx railcar

In July 2007, Masovian Railways ordered 11 control cars and 26 intermediate cars from the Twindexx family from Bombardier Transportation. They entered service in September 2008, and in August 2011, Traxx P160 DC locomotives were introduced, enabling the operator to launch Poland's first push-pull trains.

In September 2013, PKP Intercity announced a tender for the supply of 10 bilevel electric multiple units. Six potential contractors applied, but the tender was not awarded, and no vehicles were ordered.

In November 2013, after canceling an initial procedure, Masovian Railways announced a new tender for 22 bilevel railcars and 2 locomotives to form push-pull trains. The tender required compatibility with existing vehicles, so an offer from Bombardier was expected. Ultimately, Bombardier did not participate, and the order was awarded to Pesa in Bydgoszcz.

=== Design ===
Family logo

For the 2013 PKP Intercity tender for bilevel trains, Pesa's design office developed a concept for bilevel EMUs. The bilevel railcars offered in the Masovian Railways tender were a modified version, compliant with the requirement to be compatible with Twindexx railcars. The push-pull train is formed with a Gama locomotive. The exterior was designed by Bartosz Piotrowski, the interior by Mariusz Gorczyński and Wojciech Reszeta, and the driver's cab by Mariusz Gorczyński.

Pesa Sundeck railcars are Poland's first bilevel railcars, and with the Pesa Gama locomotive, the first Polish push-pull train. Their name comes from the sunny upper deck.

=== Order fulfillment ===
On 15 April 2014, Masovian Railways signed a contract with Pesa for 2 control cars, 20 intermediate cars, and 2 electric locomotives Gama, with four-year maintenance at Mińsk Mazowiecki Pesa branch. Deliveries were set for 15 January to 17 August 2015. Pesa stated the first railcars would be ready in January or February 2015, delivered after homologation in June or July.

In mid-January 2015, vehicle structures and bogies frames were under construction. The intermediate car was planned for completion in March, the control car by April, with testing and approval by July, and deliveries from 3 to 17 August.

By July 2015, the first intermediate car was ready, tested at the Tabor Railway Vehicle Institute. Compatibility issues with Twindexx railcars arose but were resolved, with tests planned with Bombardier stock. On 14 July, technical runs checked systems, installations, and performance at 160 km/h. From 31 August to 14 September, intermediate car 416B-001, hauled by a Bombardier Traxx, was tested at the Railway Institute's Żmigród track. By September, work continued on the second locomotive and more railcars, targeting early December delivery.

From 22 to 25 September 2015, intermediate car 416B-002 was shown at Trako fair (instead of a full train). Its premiere was on 23 September. The delivery deadline was set for 7 December.

On 5 October 2015, a train with a Gama locomotive and Sundeck railcars (111Eb-001+416B-001+416B-002+316B-001) arrived at Żmigród for testing from 6 October. Tests were planned until 24 October, with further tests in Warsaw by 29 October. Testing continued into November, alongside production. By late November, Pesa committed to year-end delivery, with Masovian Railways announcing penalties for delays.

On 9 December 2015, the Office of Rail Transport issued certificate T/2015/0100 for intermediate cars 416B, and on 17 December, certificate T/2015/0105 for control cars 316B. That day, all railcars were completed, compatible with Bombardier's. On 18 December, 9 intermediate cars and 1 control car were accepted, starting test runs. Driver training was ongoing. On 23 December, 4 intermediate cars, and on 29 December, 3 more were accepted. On 30 December, the final 4 intermediate cars and second control car completed the order.

On 13 January 2016, all Sundeck railcars and Gama locomotives were officially handed over at Warszawa Wschodnia railway station, with a trip to Warszawa Rembertów railway station.

== Construction ==
=== General characteristics ===
Pesa Sundeck railcars are bilevel, non-compartment second-class cars. In the standard setup, they form a push-pull train with a locomotive, 6 intermediate cars type 416B, and a control car type 316B. This configuration carries 1,700 passengers. The operating speed is 160 km/h. They can be coupled with Bombardier Twindexx cars in configurations:

- Pesa locomotive and control car with Bombardier intermediate cars,
- Bombardier locomotive and control car with Pesa intermediate cars.

=== Body ===
The railcars have a welded steel body and cladding with anti-graffiti coating. Each has two pairs of sliding plug doors per side, 1,300 mm wide.

Inter-car passages are protected by rubber bellows. Inter-car doors, 500 mm wide, are electrically operated with a button and have a reversing mechanism if obstructed.

The control car's front has buffers with energy-absorbing elements. External rear-view cameras replace mirrors, and a route-recording camera is installed.

Air conditioning units and a voltage converter are housed in roof recesses at each end.

=== Interior ===
The interior features air conditioning, forced-air heating, CCTV, and Wi-Fi. Lighting uses two rows of fluorescent lamps in ceiling recesses. The passenger information system includes GPS-based next-stop location, shown on LED displays, with crew announcement capability. Intercoms are near entrances, and passenger-counting sensors are above doors. Handrails are integrated into wall recesses for wider passages. All cars have coat hooks and yellow-blue warning stripes under the ceiling. Each car has evacuation ladders.

Most seating is in a facing-row layout, with each seatback featuring a foldable wooden table and magazine pocket. Each deck and the intermediate car's middle deck have two pairs of facing seats with foldable tables. Near the upper-deck stairs of intermediate cars, two foldable seats are installed. Wall-side armrests are fixed, others are movable. Waste bins are under seats by the central aisle. Each seat pair has one power socket. Seats are numbered, with reservation slots near luggage racks. Standing passenger handles have seat numbers in numbers and Braille.

Each intermediate car's middle deck has a toilet and is pre-fitted for future snack and ticket machines. They lack luggage racks.

The control car's lower deck has a bar table with three swivel chairs, pre-fitted for a snack machine. Both decks have two luggage racks. The middle deck near the inter-car passage has a multi-purpose area for two wheelchairs or three bicycles, with an accessible toilet and lifts at nearby doors. Accessibility features meet TSI standards. Near the driver's cab is a lockable crew compartment with a table, foldable seat, wardrobe, and socket. Opposite is a cabinet for electrical and pneumatic equipment. The driver's cab mirrors the Pesa Gama type 111Eb, with minor button layout differences, and includes a kettle, fridge, and storage. The front window has two wipers and resistive heating. All cab windows have blinds.

Some windows are tiltable, locked when air conditioning is on. Upper-deck windows have sun blinds.

The entrance vestibule floor, one step up from the door, is 1,060 mm above the rail. Platforms from 300 to 1,060 mm are served with two extendable steps per entrance. Stairs lead to upper and lower decks, and a sloped floor to middle decks.

Intermediate car
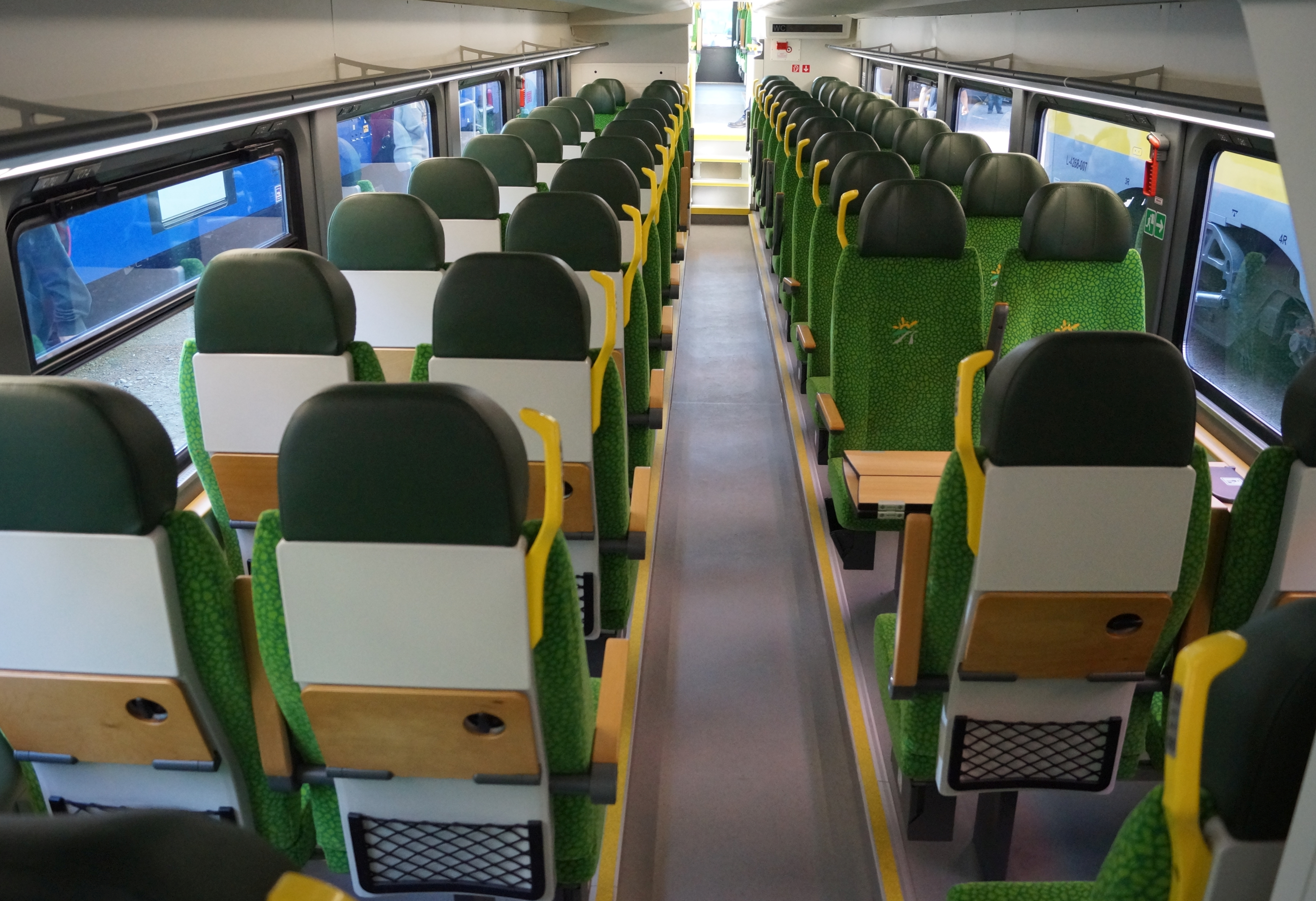
Lower deck

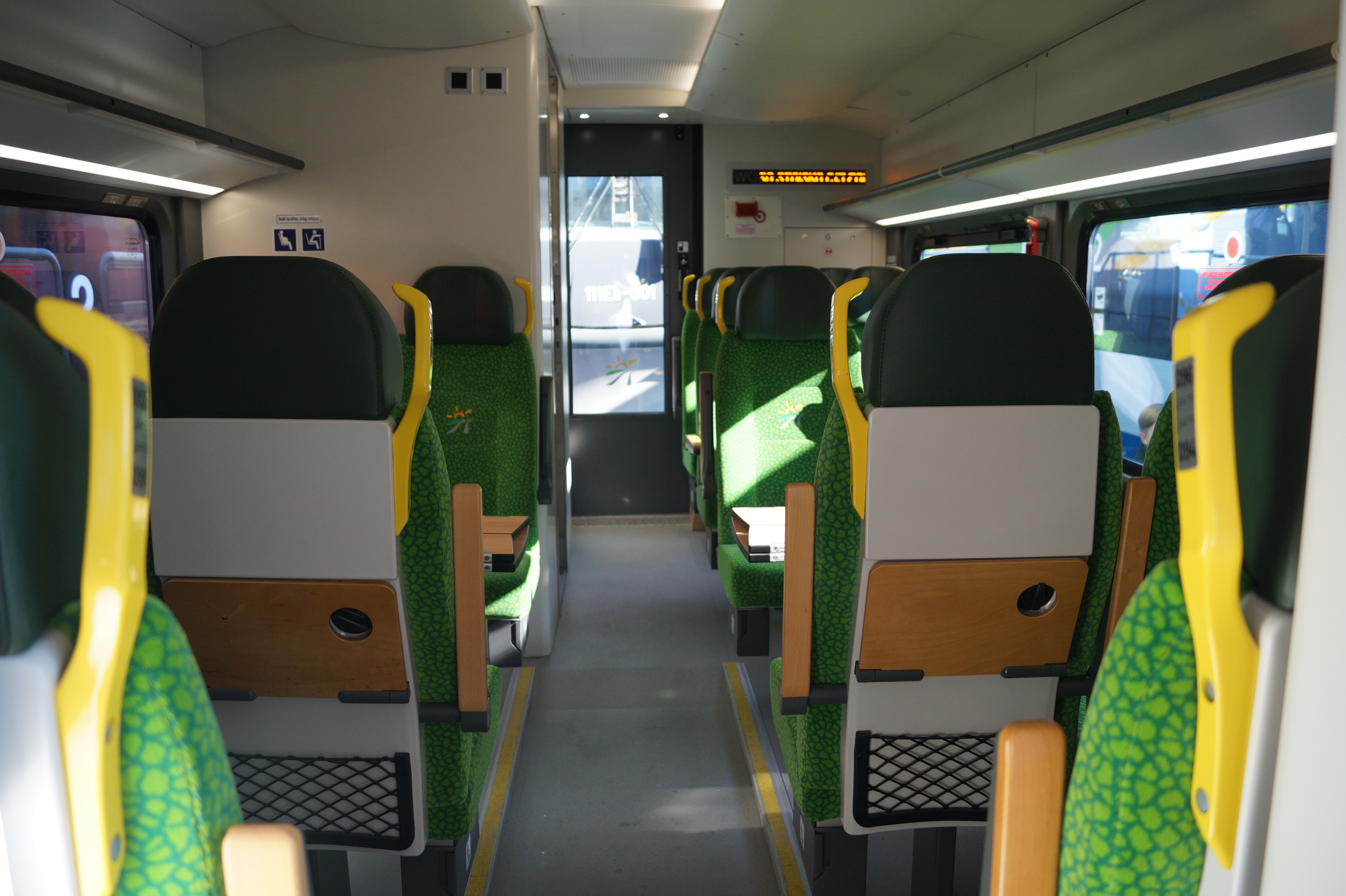
Intermediate deck

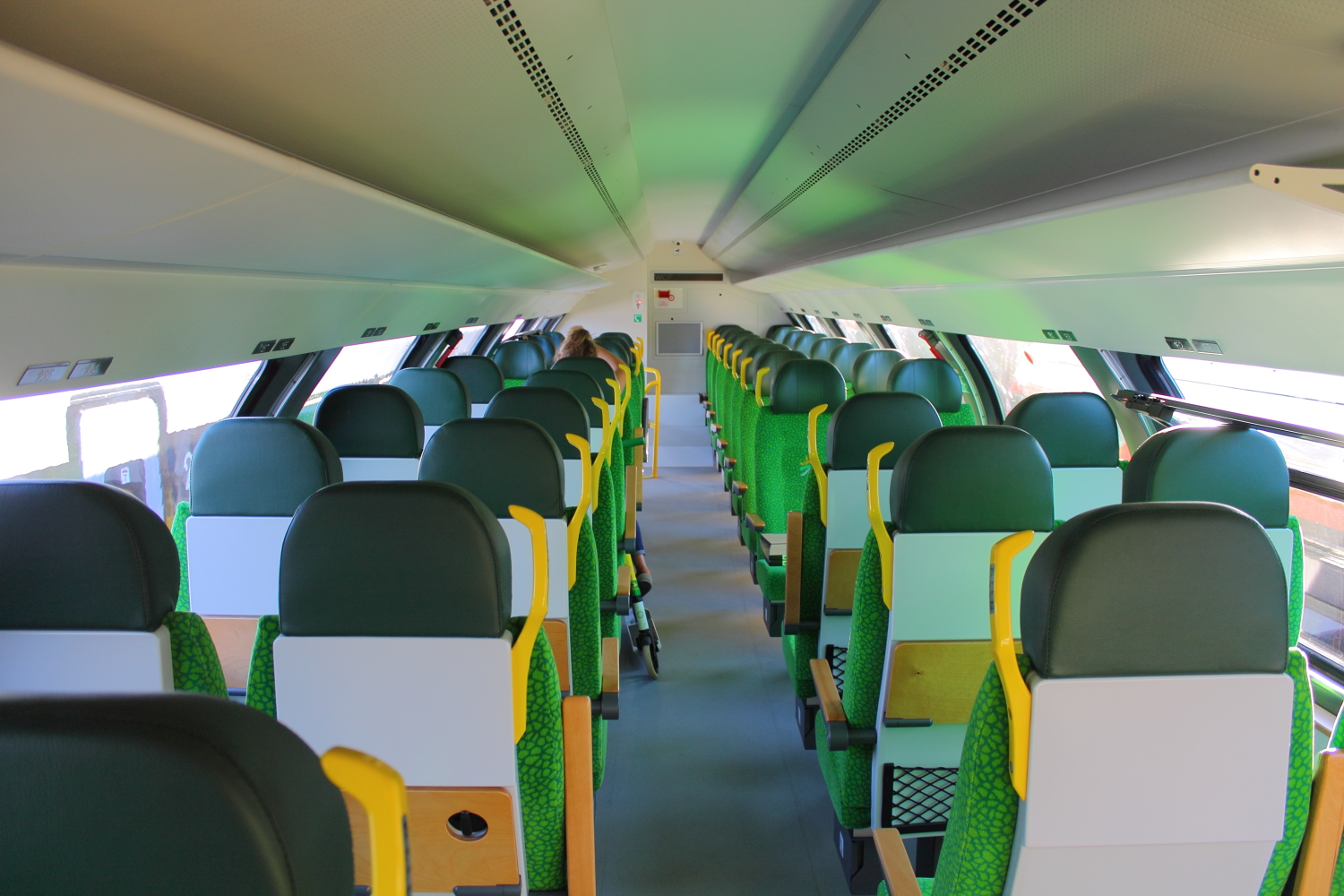
Upper deck

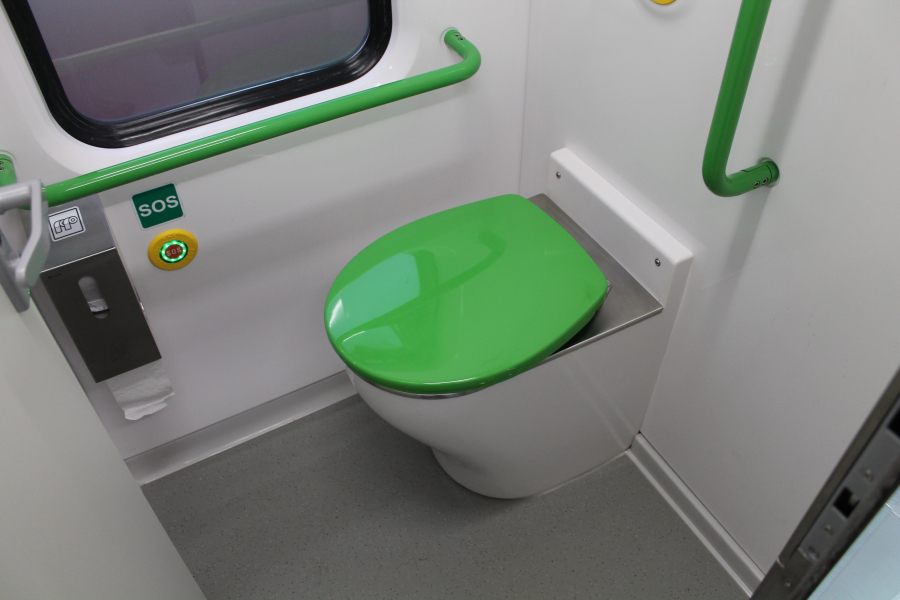
Toilet
Control car
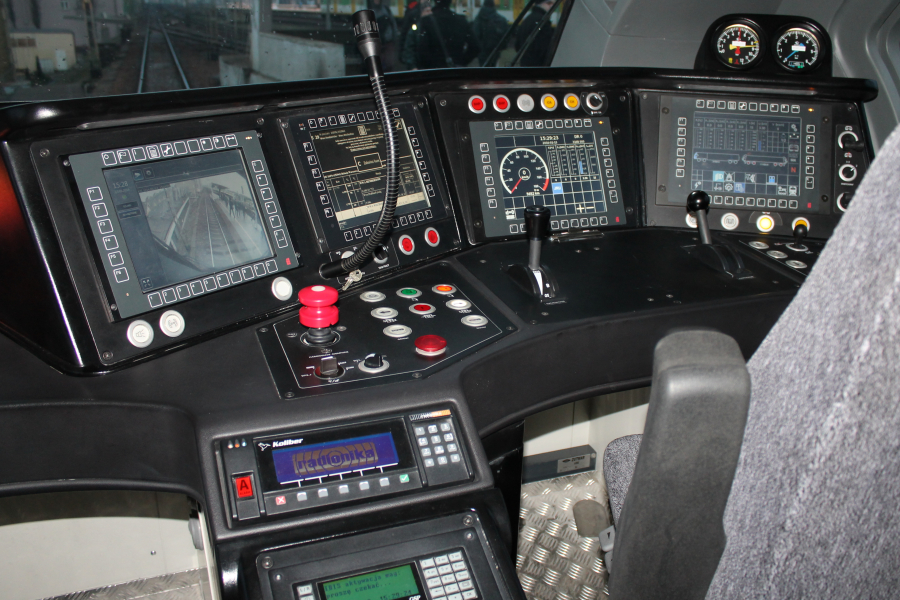
Driver’s desk

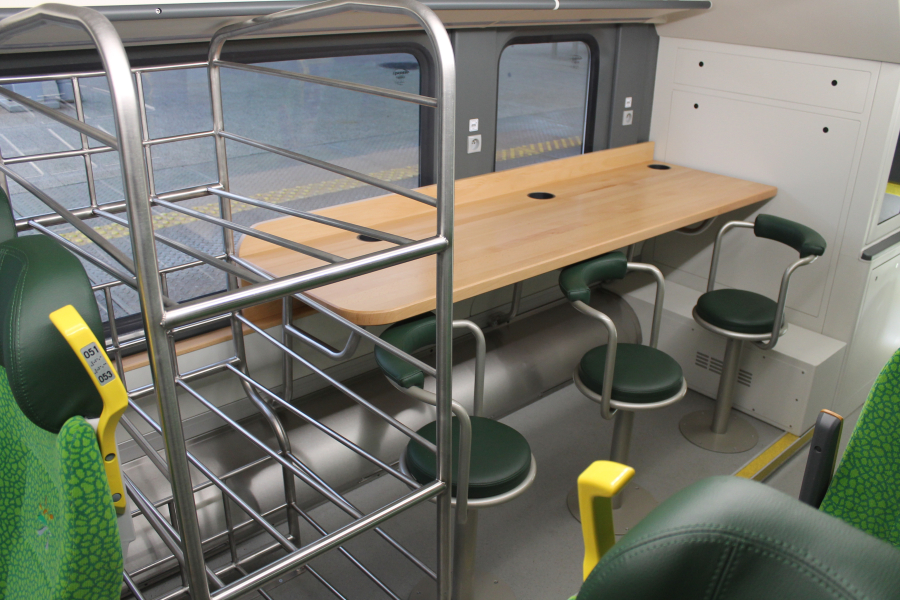
Bar area

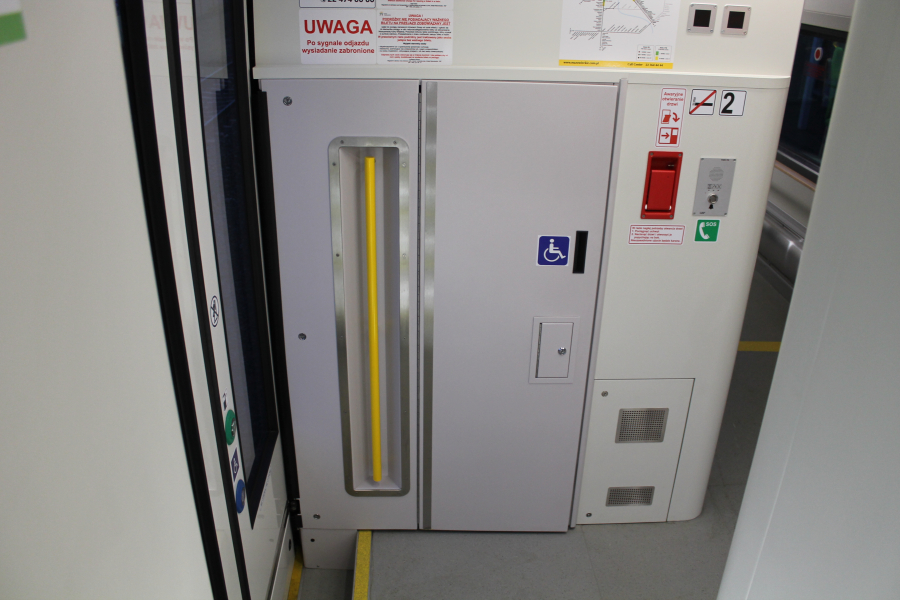
Wheelchair ramp

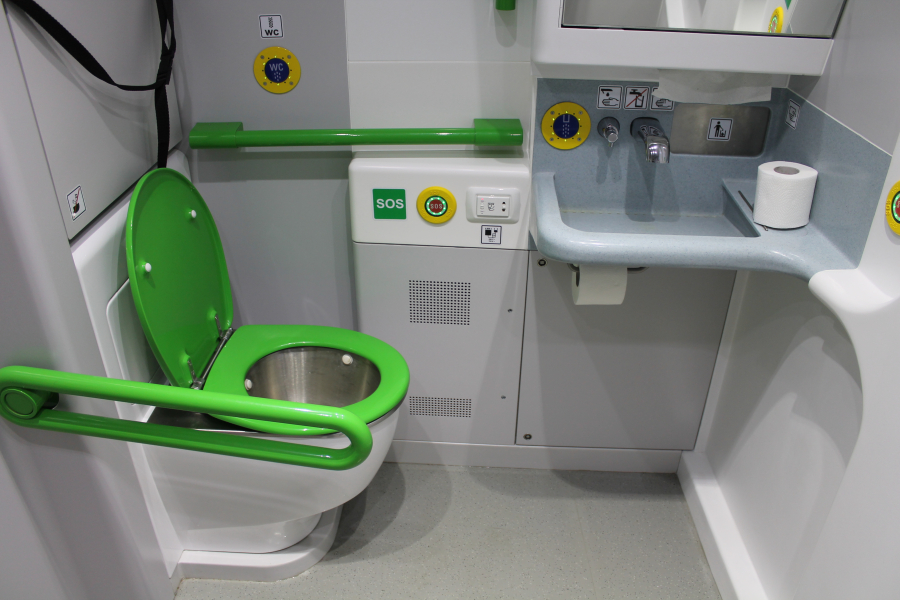
Toilet

=== Undercarriage ===
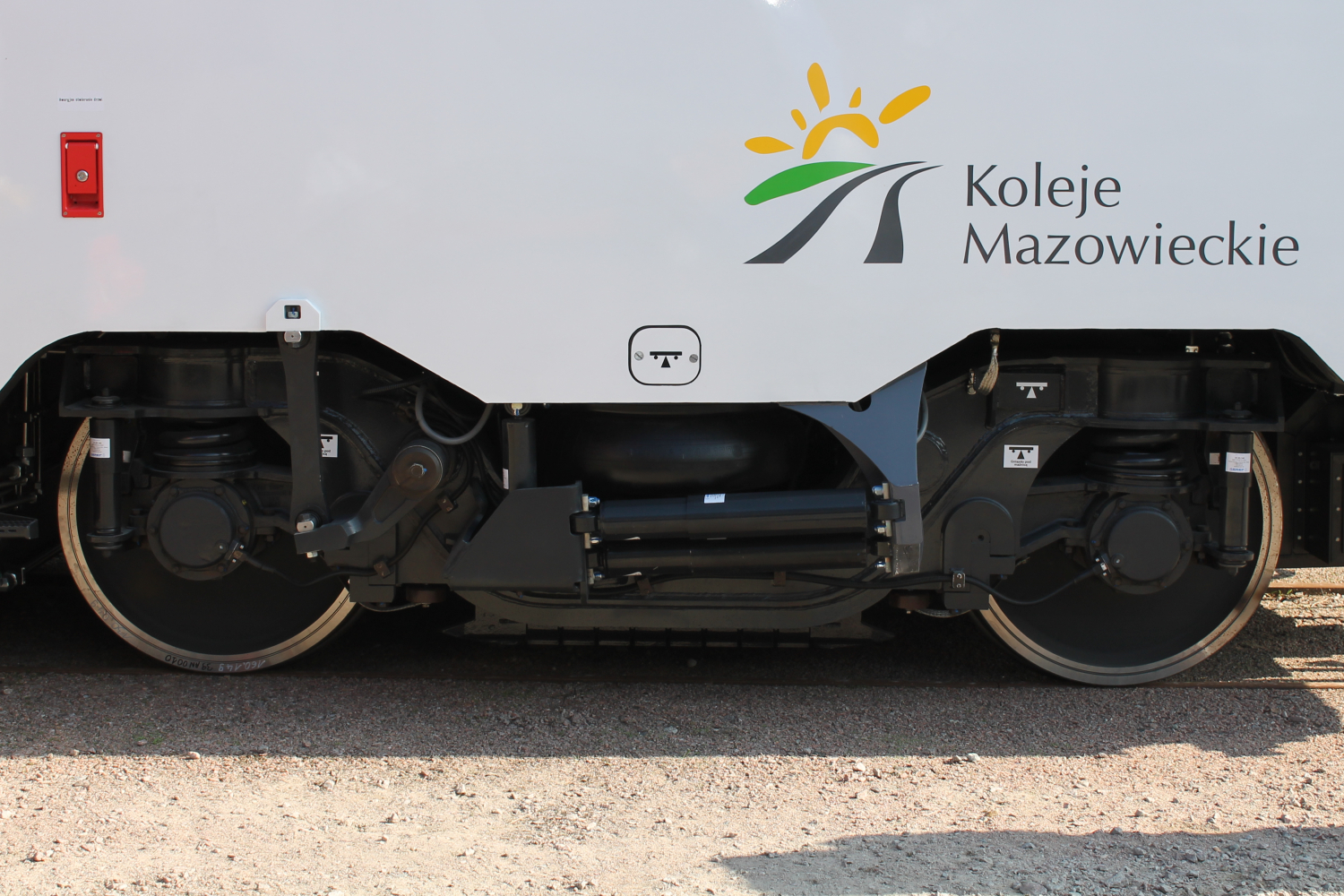
Bogie type 39AN

Each railcar rests on two type 39AN bogies, each with a roll stabilizer, magnetic track brakes, and an anti-slip system. Primary suspension uses coil springs, and the body rests on the bogie frame via air springs maintaining constant floor height. Wheelsets are guided by swing axles. Each wheelset has three brake discs. The bogie under the control car's cab includes a sandbox, wheel flange lubricators, and an SHP electromagnet.

Each railcar's wheelbase is 19,000 mm, bogie wheelbase 2,500 mm, and wheel diameter 920 mm.

== Operation ==
Country	Operator	Car type	Number of units	Series	UIC designation	Start of operation	Sources
Poland	Masovian Railways	316B	2	B^{16}bfmnopux	50 51 26-78 047–048	31 January 2016	
Poland	Masovian Railways	416B	20	B^{16}mnopux	50 51 26-78 027–046	31 January 2016	

Masovian Railways ordered Sundeck bilevel railcars to extend existing bilevel trains and launch new express services from Warsaw to Dęblin, Działdowo, Płock, and Radom. At the contract's signing, routes to Skierniewice and Sochaczew were considered. Later, connections to Wołomin, Skarżysko-Kamienna, and Łuków were added. Some cars were to enter service in September 2015, with all in use by the December schedule change. Due to delays, Masovian Railways estimated first-quarter 2016 for operation. After accepting the first cars in December, they planned January 2016. Due to incomplete Office of Rail Transport documentation, this shifted to February. Operation began on 31 January 2016.

The railcars initially served express trains:

- Radomiak: Warszawa Wschodnia–Radom and back (6 Sundeck cars, 1 Gama locomotive),
- Wiedenka: Warszawa Wschodnia–Skierniewice and back (5 Sundeck cars, 1 Gama locomotive),
- Łukowianka: Warszawa Zachodnia–Łuków and back (6 Sundeck cars).

Later, they operated the Bolimek express from Warszawa Wschodnia to Żyrardów.

In the first three months, only intermediate cars had failures, all in February. In the first year, issues included heating, air conditioning, and window leaks. Sundecks and Gamas operated in mixed trains with Twindexx and Traxx, as required.

== Awards ==
- 2016 – Dobry Wzór 2016 award in the Transport and Communication category.
