= Pesa Twist =

Articulated low floor tram in Poland

PESA Twist
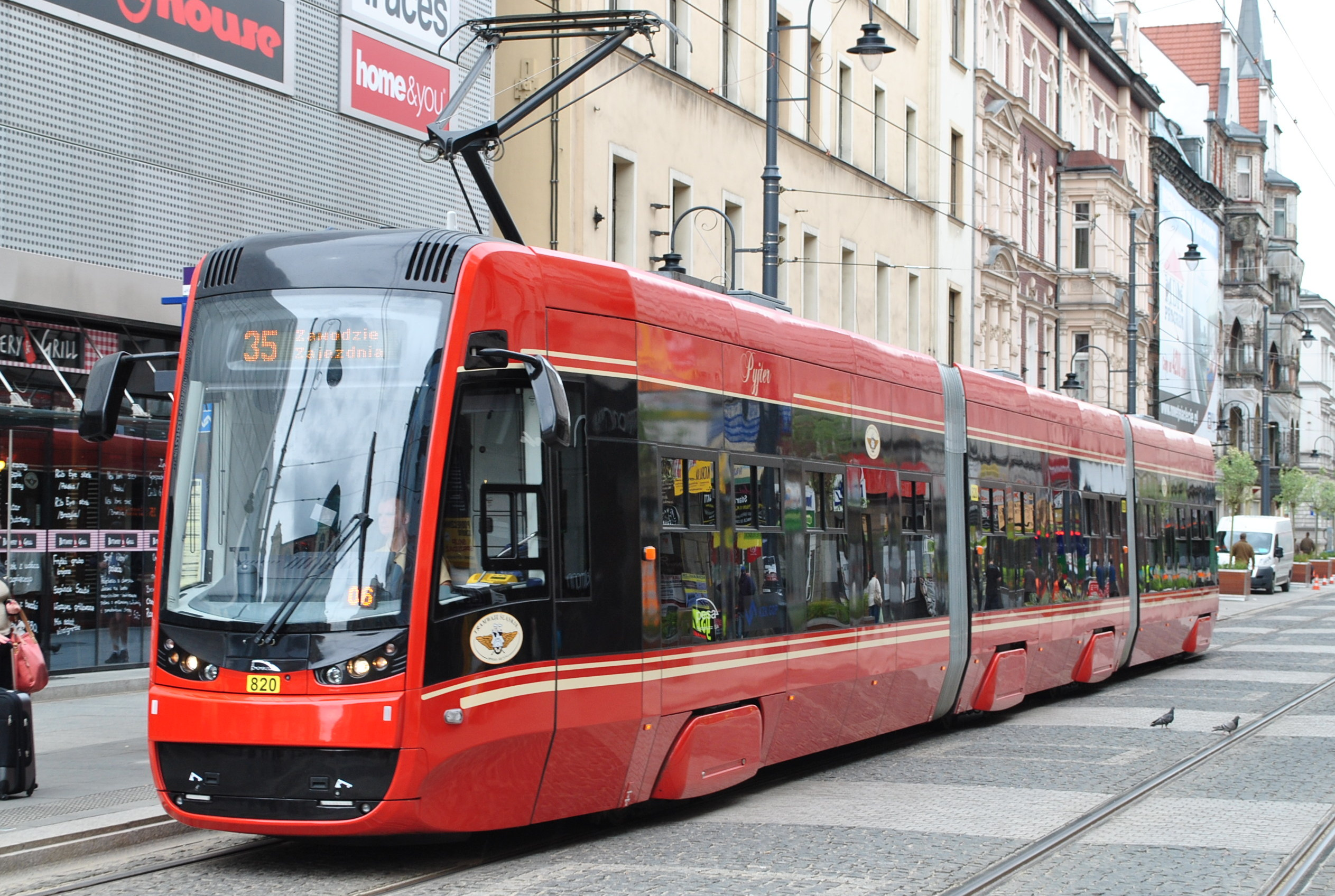
- Pesa Twist Step in Katowice
- Manufacturer: PESA
- Constructed: 2006-present
- Number built: 213
- Capacity: 58-102 (Seated)

Specifications
- Width: 2.4 metres (7 ft 10 in)
- Height: 3.4 metres (11 ft 2 in)
- Articulated sections: 3-4
- Maximum speed: 70–75 km/h (43–47 mph)
- Track gauge: 1067mm / 1435mm / 1524mm

Pesa Twist is an articulated low floor tram produced in Bydgoszcz by Pesa SA. The Twist is currently operated in Częstochowa, Metropolis GZM, Kyiv, Kraków, Wrocław, Craiova and Tallinn.

== History ==
In 2006 Pesa Bydgoszcz started the production of trams. The Tramicus model was built until 2008, and in 2010 the production of wagons from the Swing family began. Their constructions were similar – the tram with a length of about 30 m had 5 sections and moved on 3 fixed bogies.

In the same year MPK Częstochowa announced a tender for the purchase of brand new low-floor trams, because due to the planned opening of a new tram line, the needs of rolling stock increased. The carrier, due to the poor condition of the tracks, wanted to purchase trams with a lower static axle load on the track than provided for by the Polish standard. Another requirement of the customer was all swivel bogies with a classic axial wheelset.

In 2012 Silesian Interurbans bought 30 Pesa twist-step trams, and a year later Moscow bought 120 Pesa Fokstrot units (based on Twist-Step). In the following year, MPK Kraków bought 36 trams, and in 2015 MPK Wrocław also bought Pesa Twist trams.

== Gallery ==
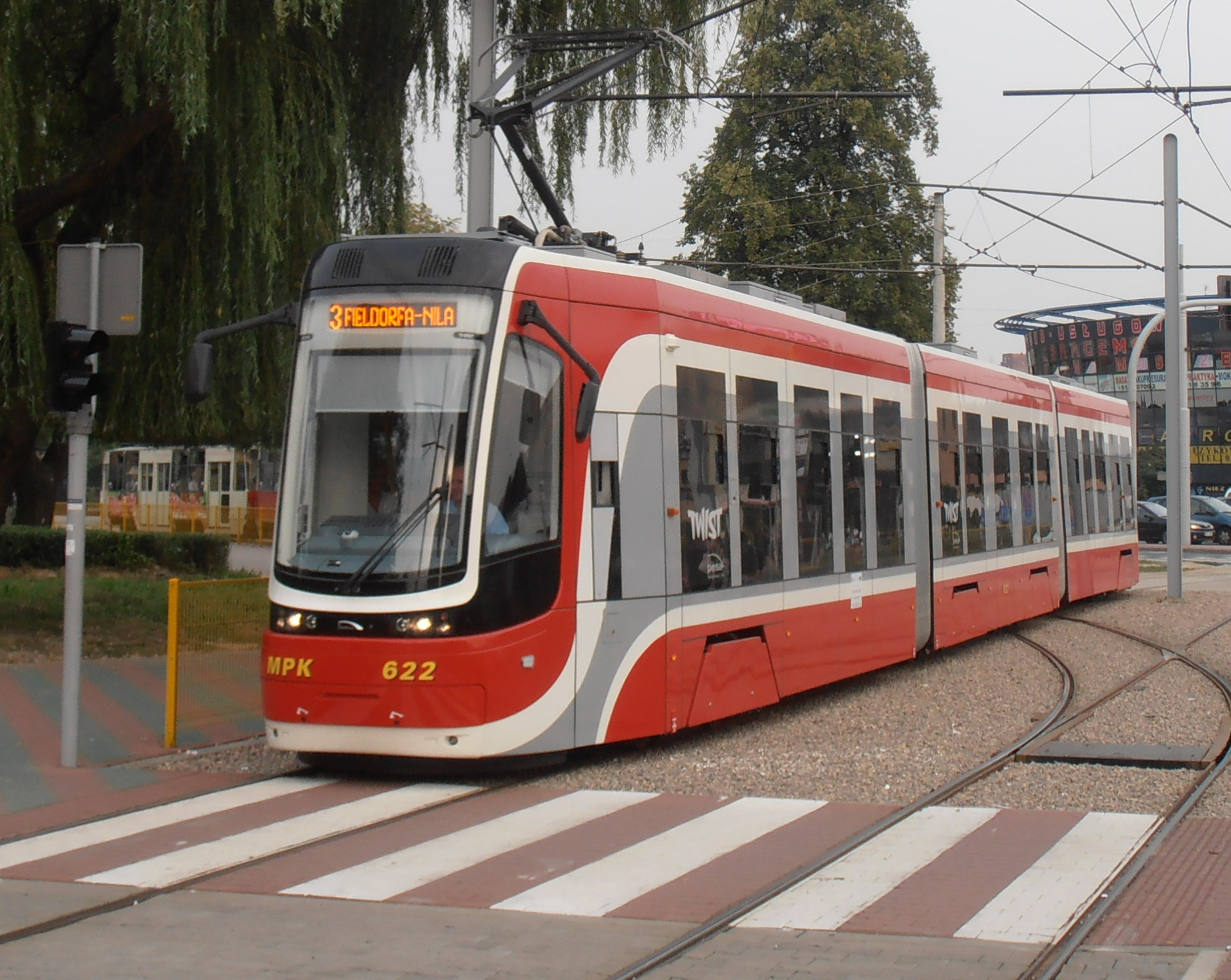

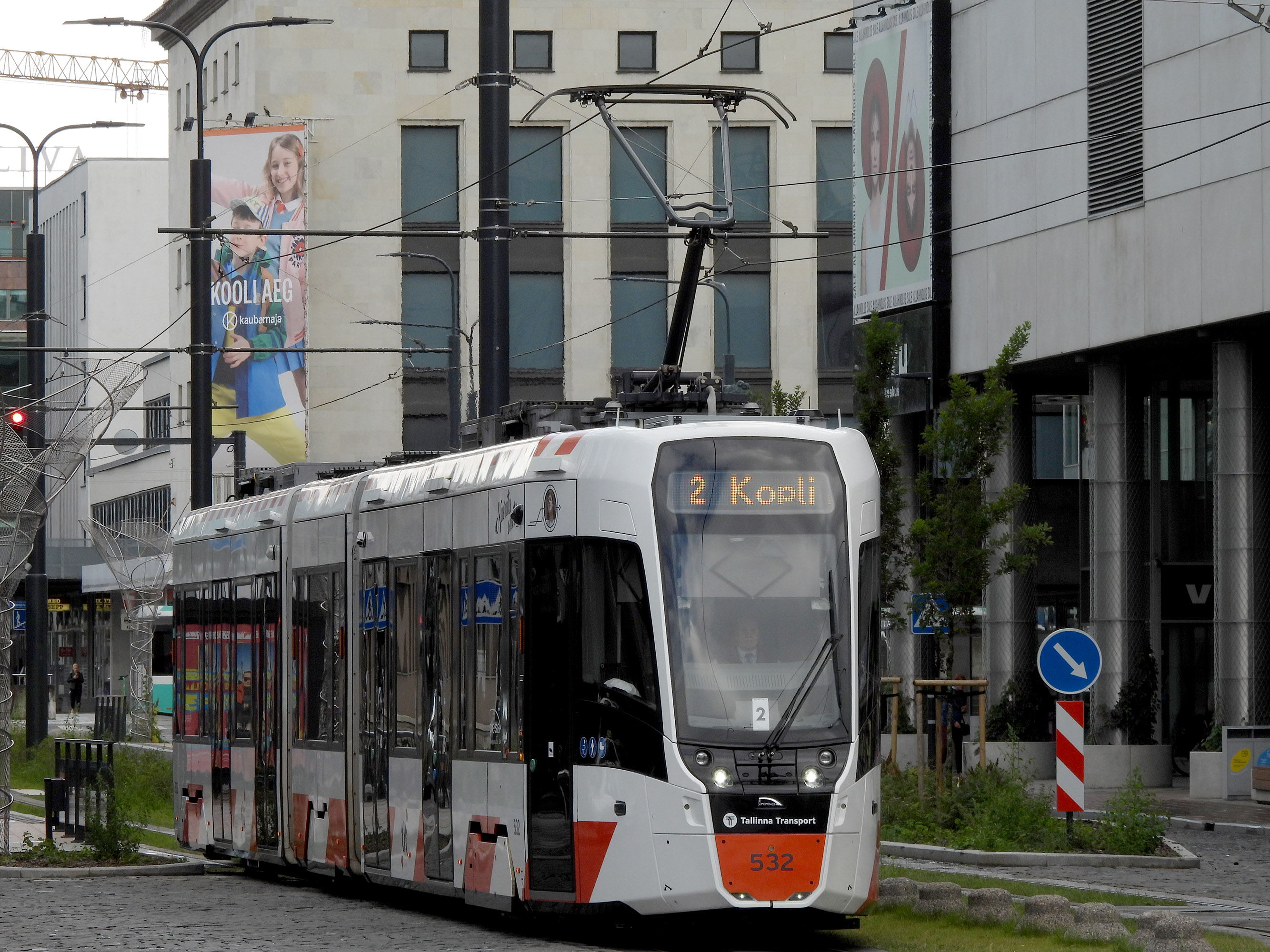

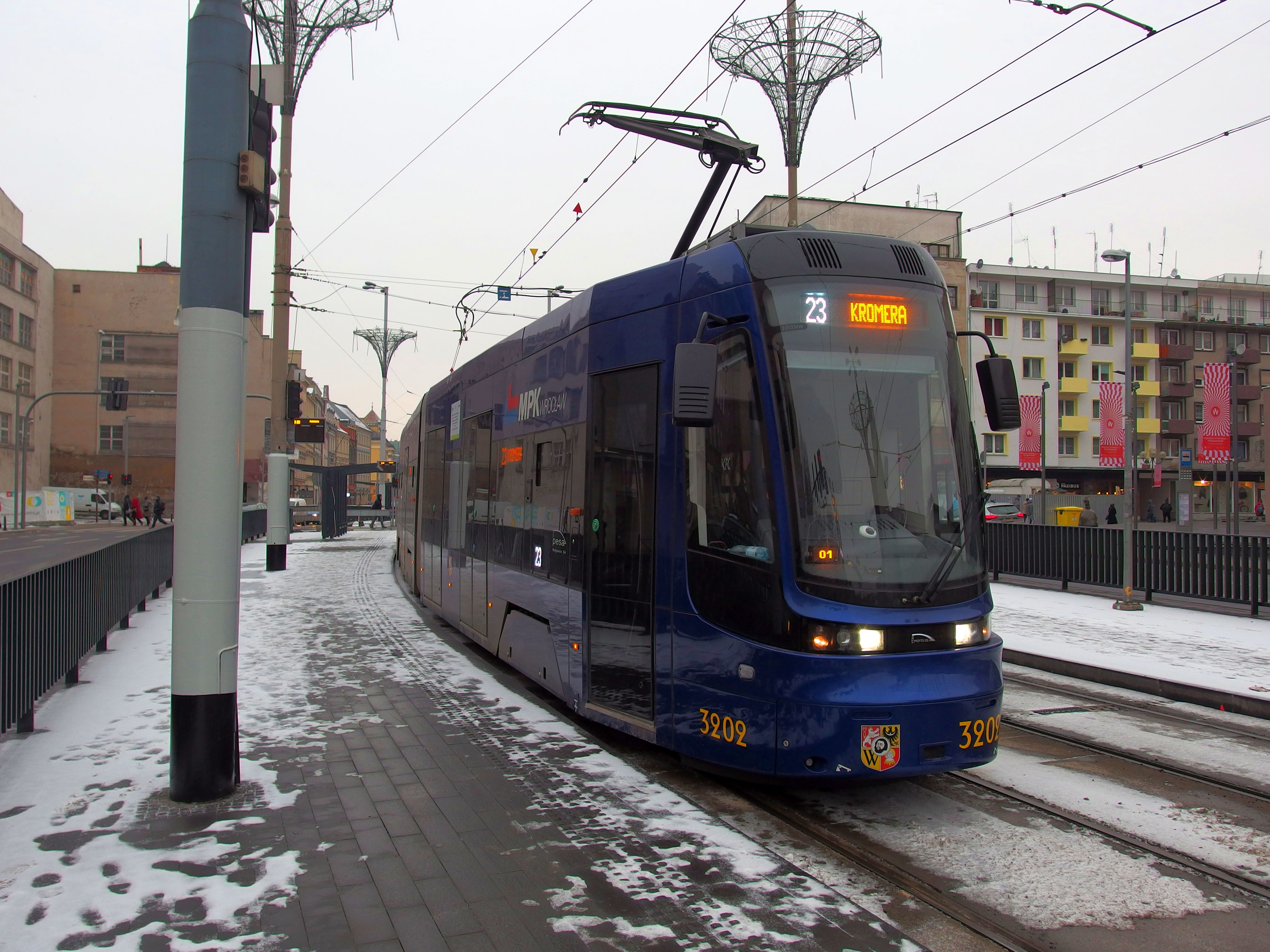

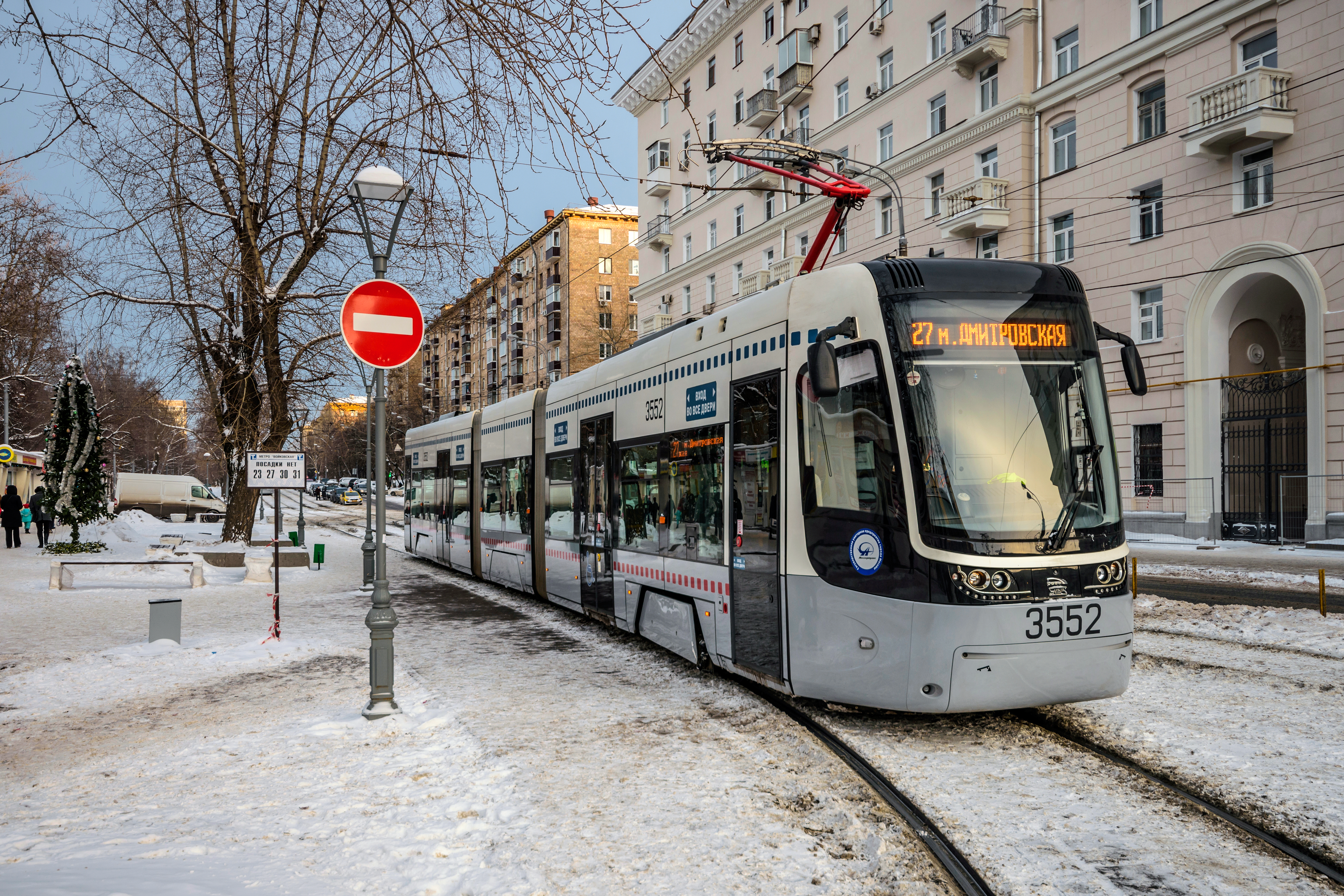
Pesa Fokstrot

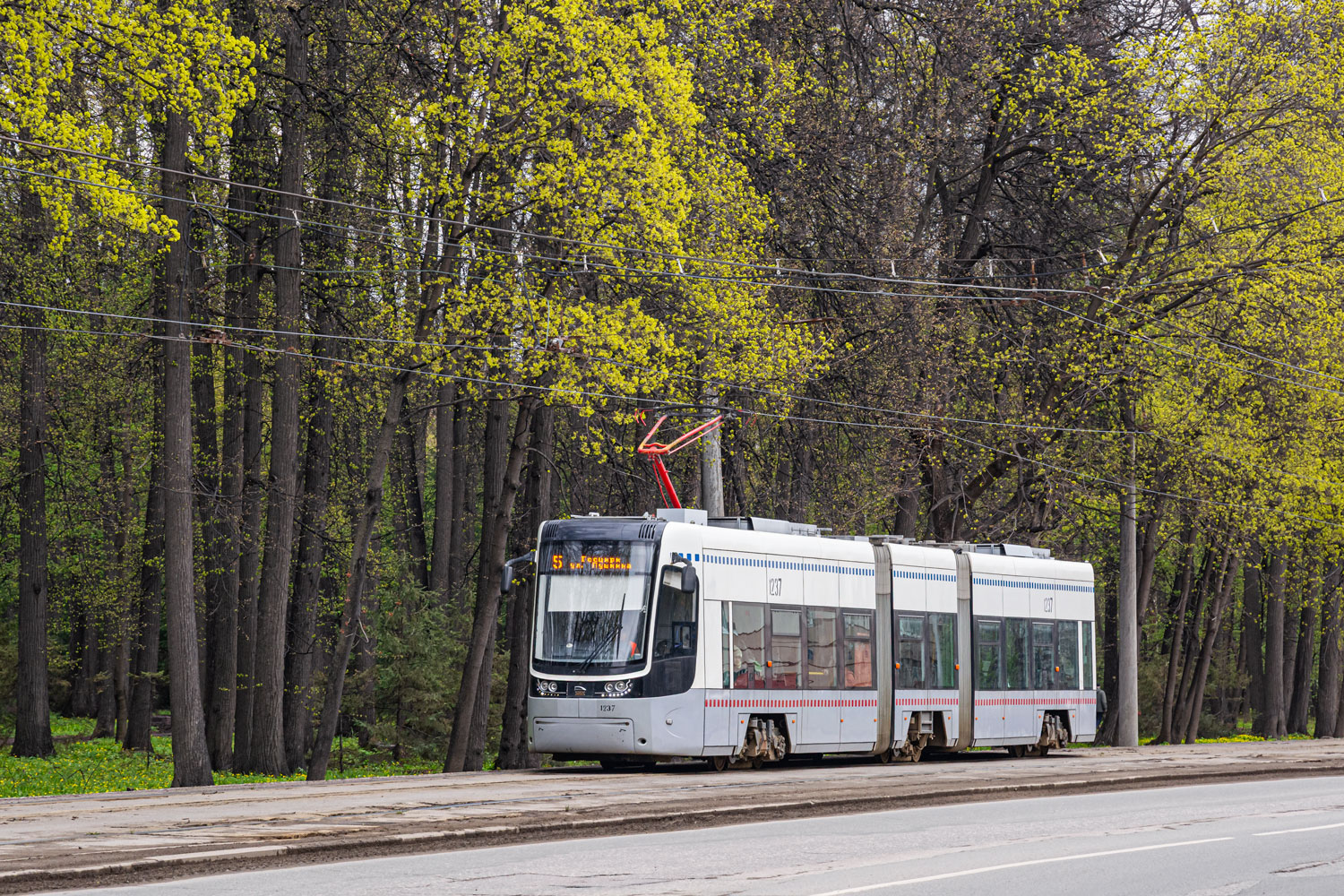

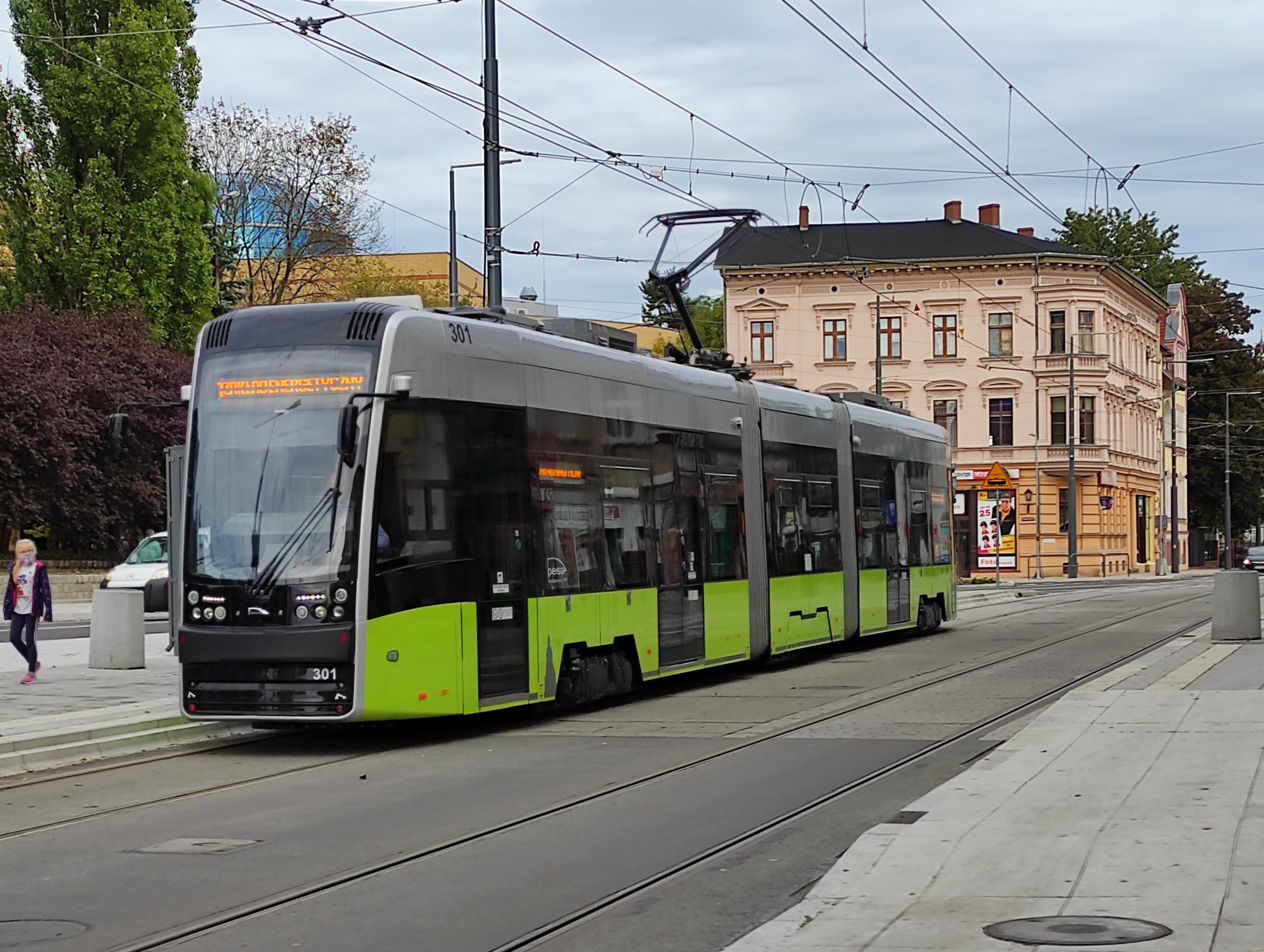

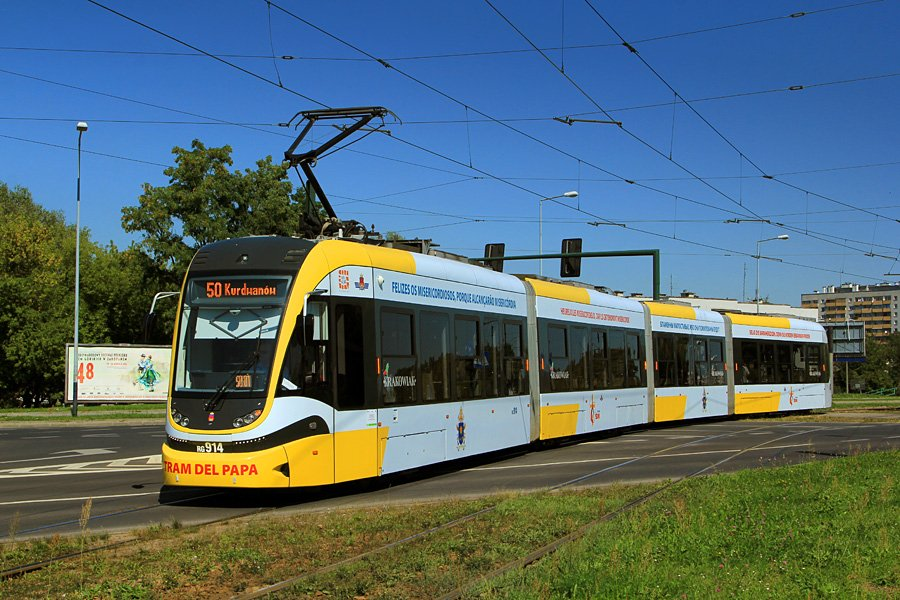

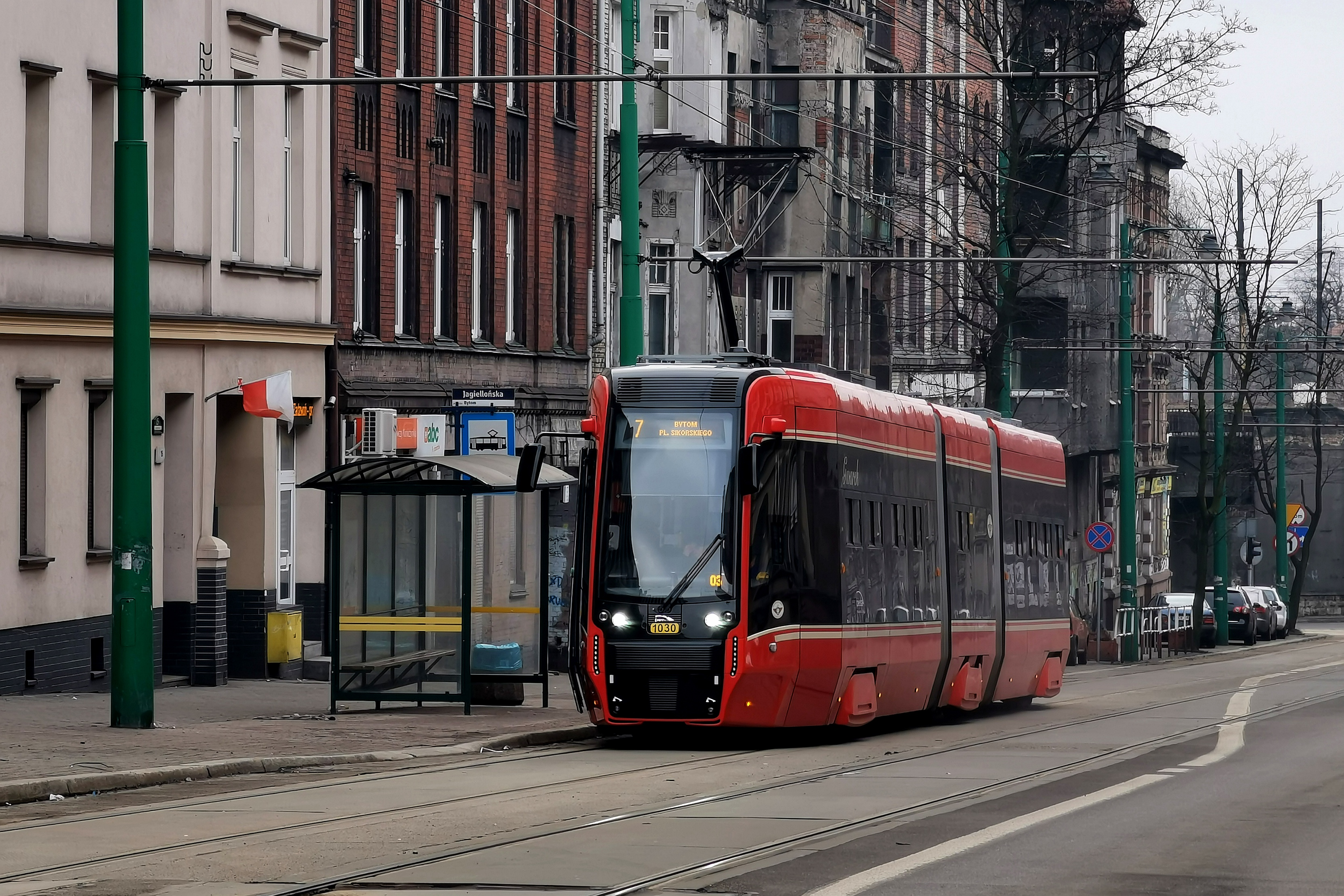
Pesa Twist 2017N

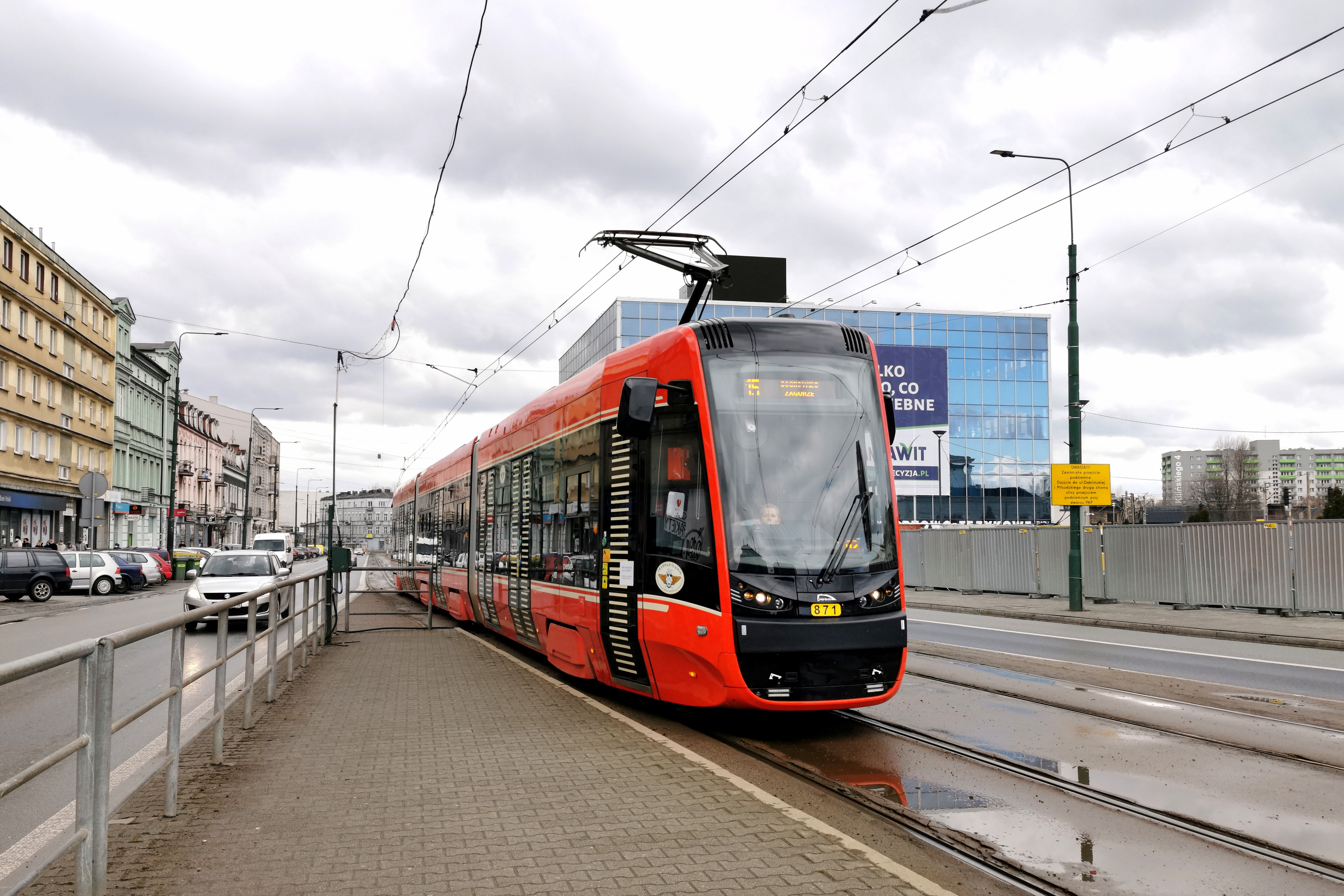

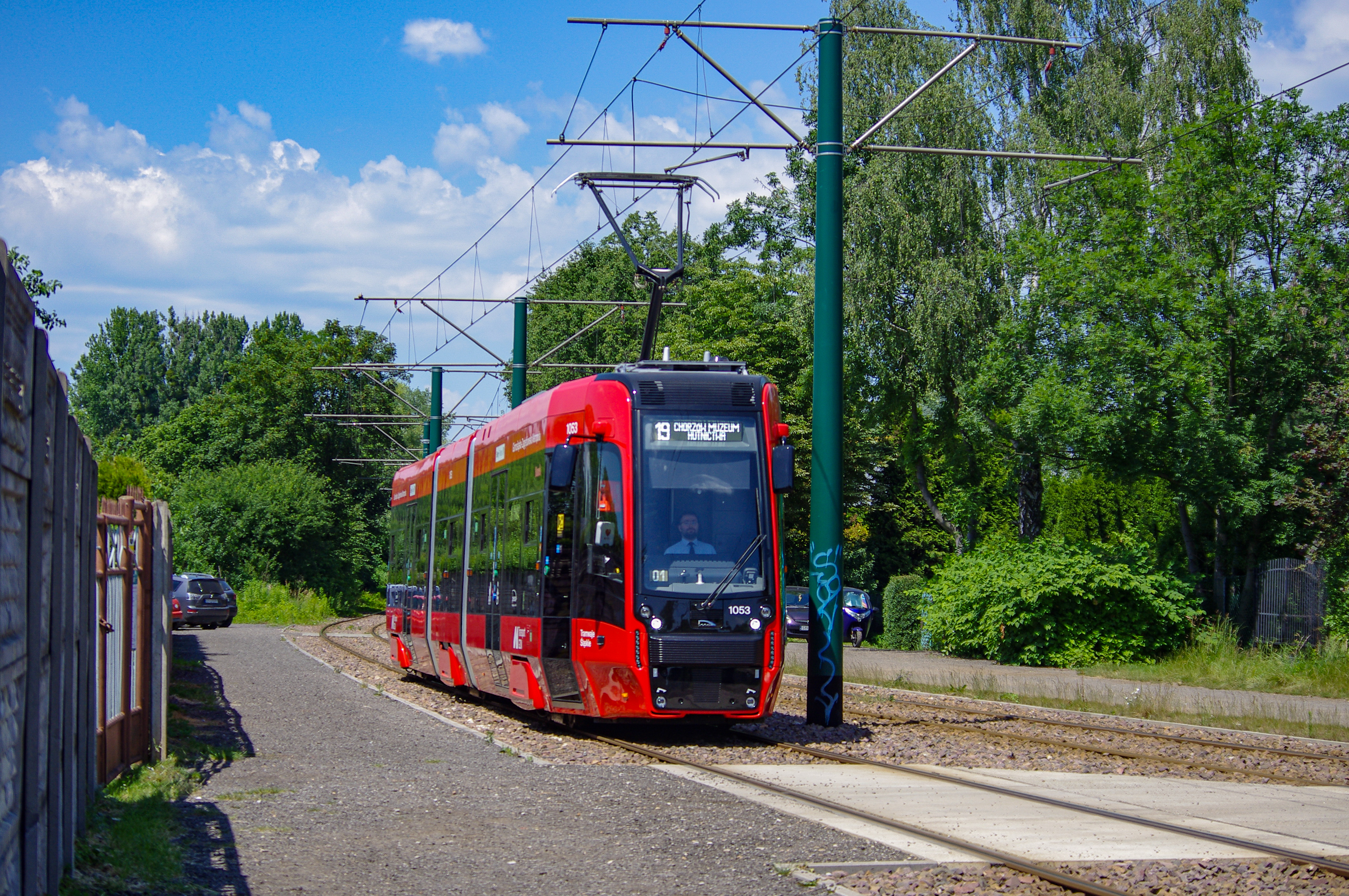
Pesa Twist 2017N-10

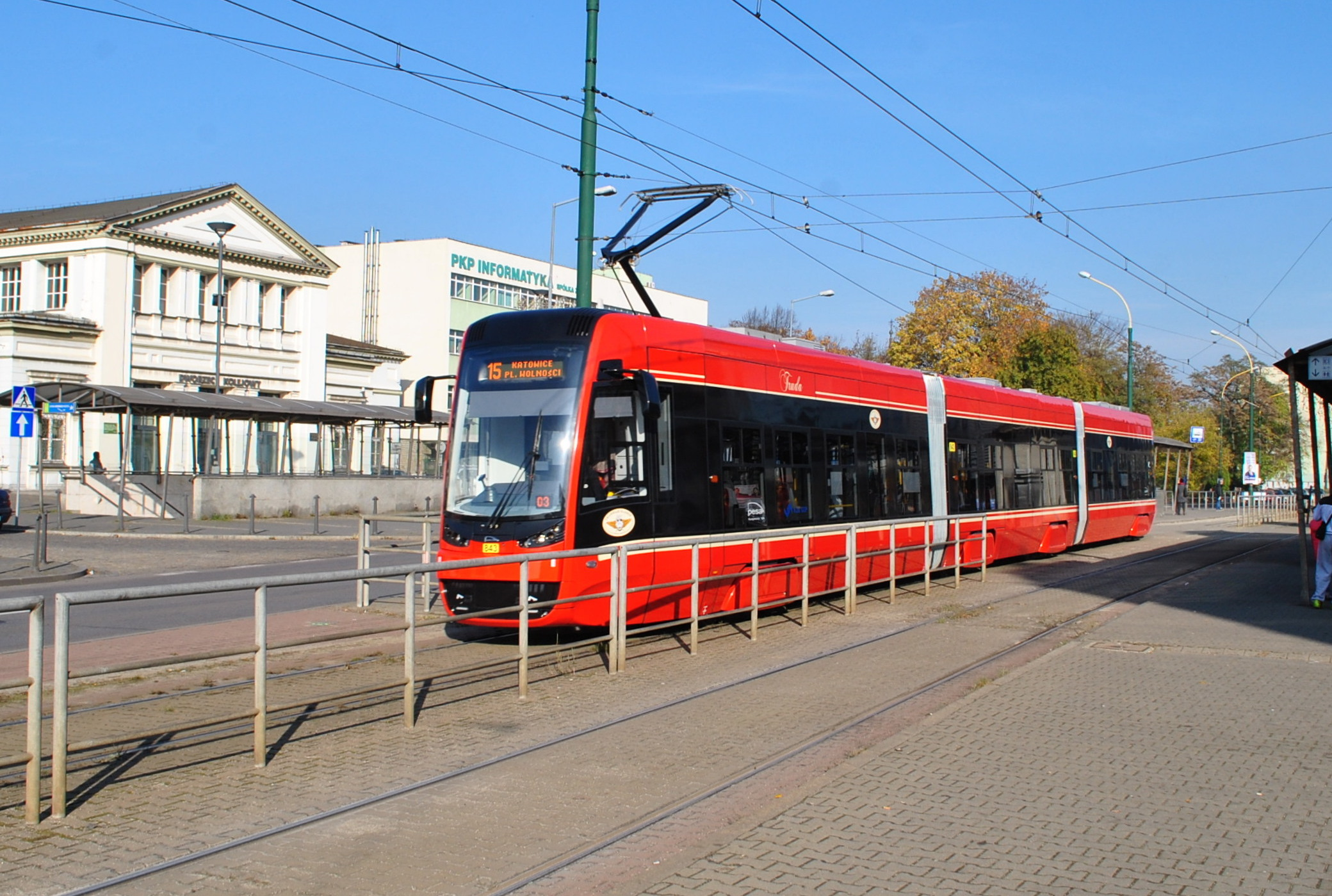

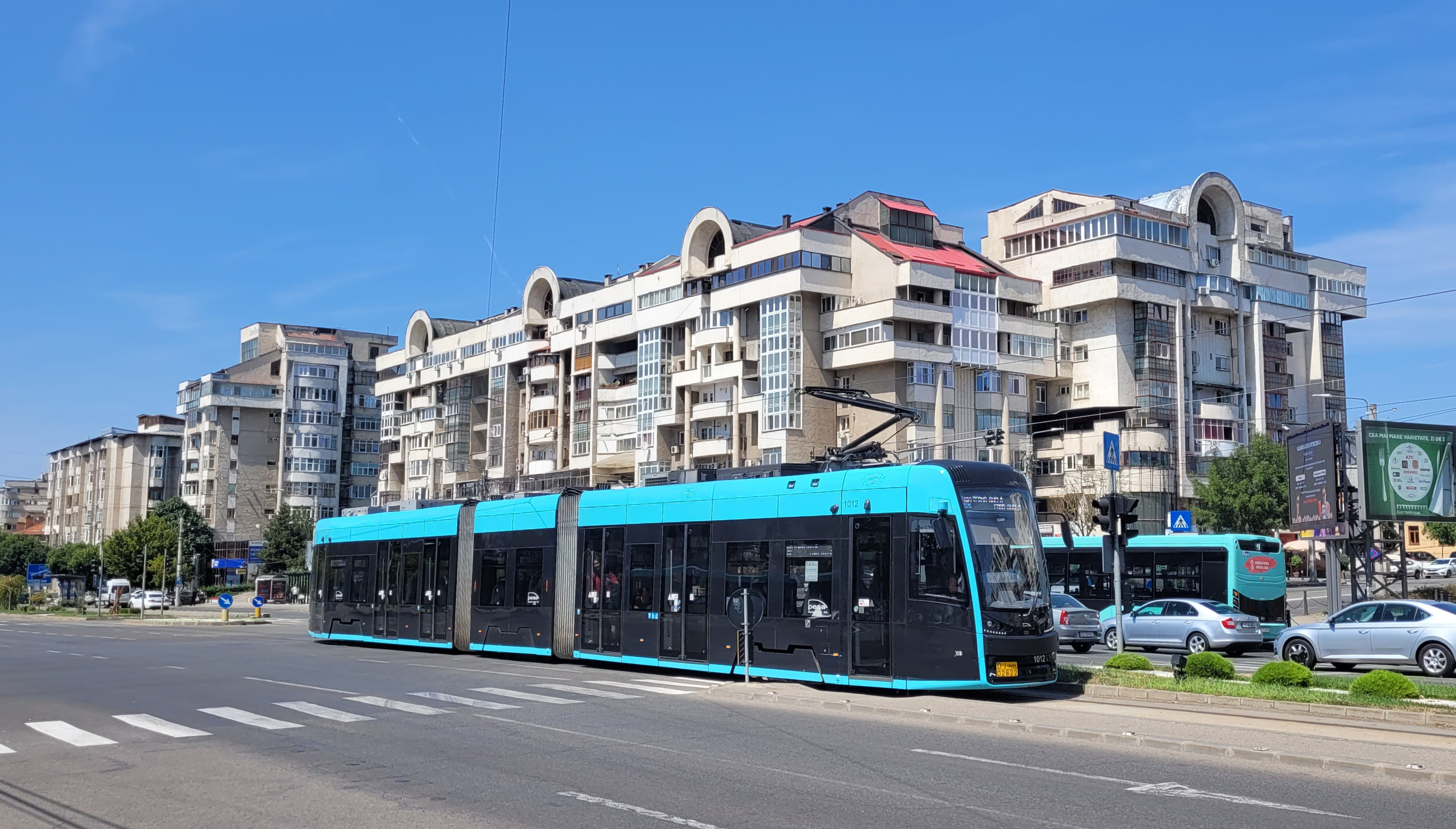

== See also ==
- Transport in Poland
- List of rolling stock manufacturers
